= List of supermarket chains in Bulgaria =

This is a list of supermarket chains in Bulgaria. The concept of supermarkets (and later hypermarkets) came to Bulgaria after 1989 and most supermarkets are made up of joint ventures between Bulgarian and foreign investors. Since 2000, there has been a strong growth in the number of supermarkets in the country, particularly in Sofia and other main urban areas. For supermarkets worldwide, see List of supermarkets.

== Supermarkets and hypermarkets ==
Name	Stores	Type of stores	First store in Bulgaria	Parent
Berezka	64	supermarket	2009	Beryozka Bulgaria OOD
BILLA	167	supermarket	2000	REWE Group
BulMag	21	supermarket	1995	BulMag
Carrefour	9	supermarket	2009-2016, 2024-now	Carrefour Group
CBA	120	supermarket	2003	CBA Kereskedelmi Kft.
Fantastico	48	supermarket	1991	Fantastico
Hit Max	2	hypermarket	2021	HIT HYPERMARKET EOOD
Kam Market	26	supermarket	2017	Kam Market
Kaufland	69	hypermarket	2006	Schwarz Gruppe
Lidl	139	discount	2010	Schwarz Gruppe
METRO	11	cash & carry	1999	Metro Cash and Carry
ProMarket	14	supermarket	2002	ProMarket
T Market	138	supermarket	2005	Maxima Group

== Home improvement, furniture and toys ==
Name	Stores	Type of stores	First store in Bulgaria	Parent
Bauhaus	1	hypermarket	2012	Bauhaus
CarpetMax	5	hypermarket	1996	CarpetMax
Expert Doors	16	retail	2016	Expert Doors
HippoLand	29	retail	2005	HippoLand
HomeMax	8	hypermarket	2014	CarpetMax
IKEA	6	hypermarket	2011	IKEA
Jumbo	11	hypermarket	2007	Jumbo S.A.
Jysk	57	retail	2005	Jysk
Mr. Bricolage	12	hypermarket	2000	Mr. Bricolage
Pepco	173	retail	2019	Pepco
Praktiker	17	hypermarket	2004	Technopolis
Praktis	9	hypermarket	2002	Praktis
Videnov	44	retail	1990	Videnov
Star Steel Door	43	retail	2006	Star Steel Door

=== Former chains ===
Name	Stores	Type of stores	First store in Bulgaria	Closed/sold	Parent
bauMax	8	hypermarket	2006	2014	bauMax

== Consumer electronics ==
Name	Stores	Type of stores	First store in Bulgaria	Parent
Technomarket	56	hypermarket	1999	Technomarket
Technopolis	35	hypermarket	2001	Technopolis
Techmart	17	hypermarket & retail	2013	Techmart
Zora	42	hypermarket & retail	1991	Zora

=== Former chains ===
Name	Stores	Type of stores	First store in Bulgaria	Closed/sold	Parent
DOMO	50+	retail	2006	2010	Technomarket
Multirama	11	retail	2005	2012	Germanos
Triumf	11	supermarket	2000	2019 (ALL except 1 store in Kamenitsa, Plovdiv	Triumf

== Clothing, cosmetics, sport and healthcare ==
Name	Stores	Type of stores	First store in Bulgaria	Parent
Bershka	7	retail	-	Inditex
Decathlon	12	hypermarket	2013	Decathlon
Deichmann	21	retail	2009	Deichmann SE
DM	120	retail	2009	DM
H&M	20	retail	2012	H&M
Lilly drogerie	123	retail	2010	Lilly drogerie
Massimo Dutti	5	retail	-	Inditex
NewYorker	28	retail	2008	NewYorker
Oysho	5	retail	-	Inditex
Peek & Cloppenburg	4	retail	2010	Peek & Cloppenburg
Pull & Bear	5	retail	-	Inditex
Sinsay	63	retail	2016	LPP
Sport Vision	12	retail	2013	Sport Vision
Stradivarius	5	retail	-	Inditex
Tempo	29	retail	2003	Tempo
Zara	7	retail	-	Inditex

== Gallery ==
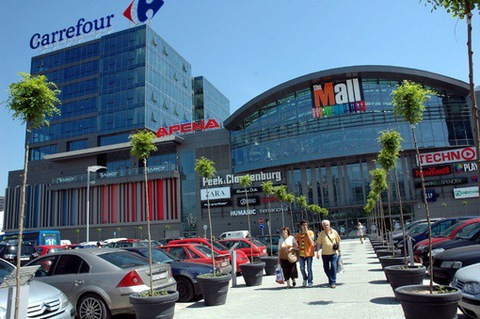
Carrefour's largest store in Bulgaria (9,000 m2) was located at The Mall on Tsarigradsko shose in Sofia between 2012 and 2016.

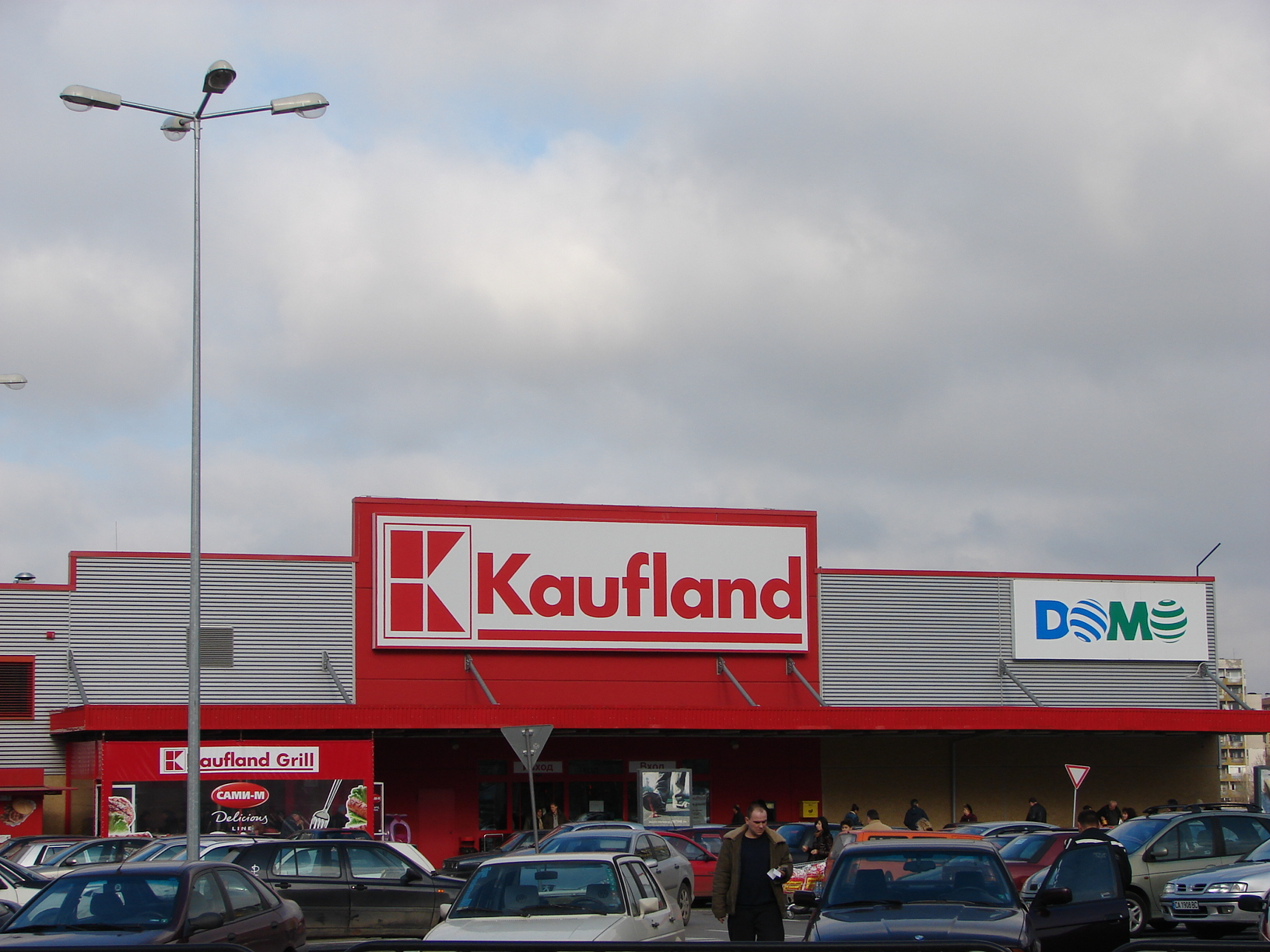
A medium-size Kaufland store in Sofia (2007)

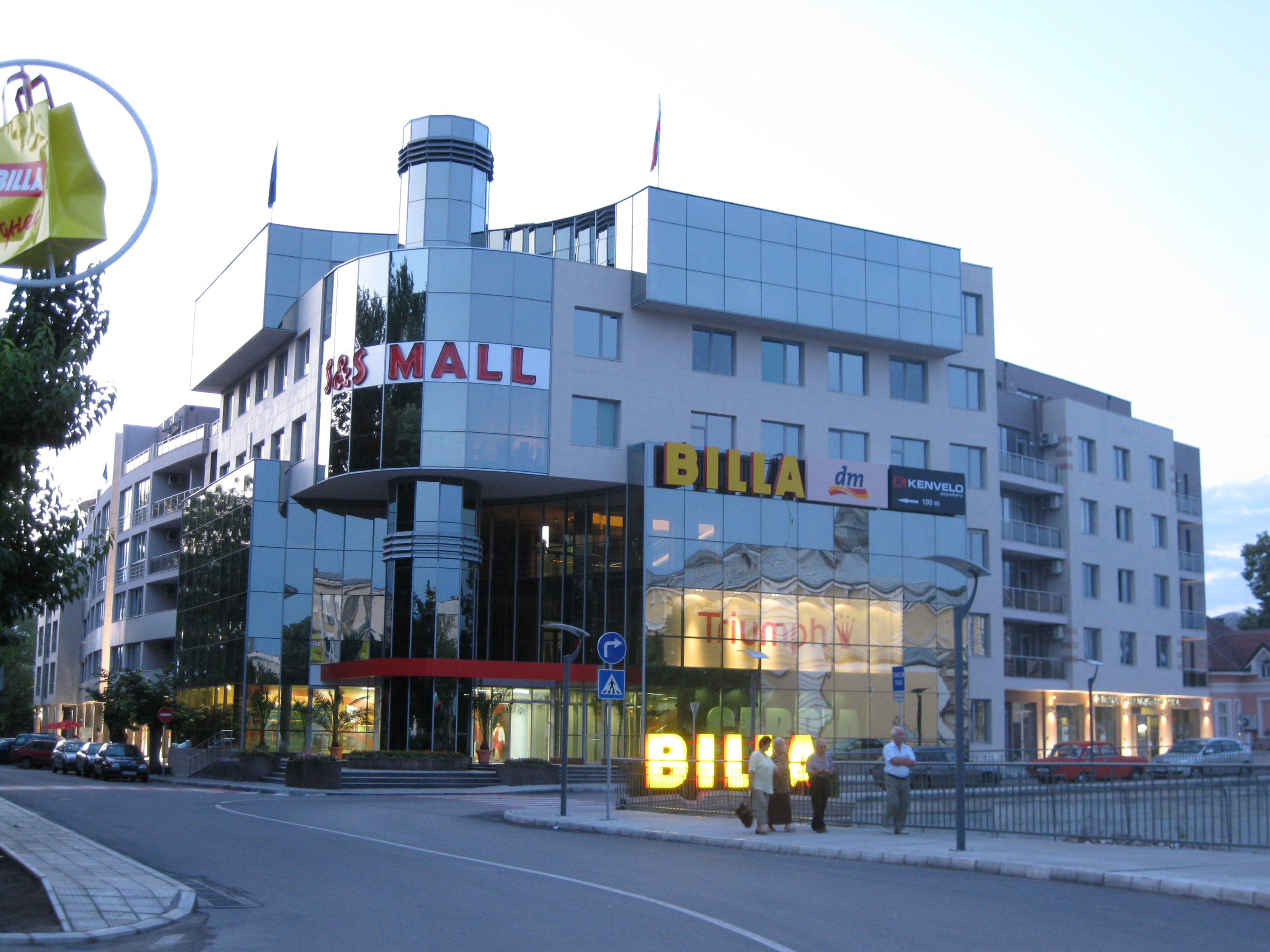
An example of a smaller Billa store, built inside a shopping center in Silistra (2009)

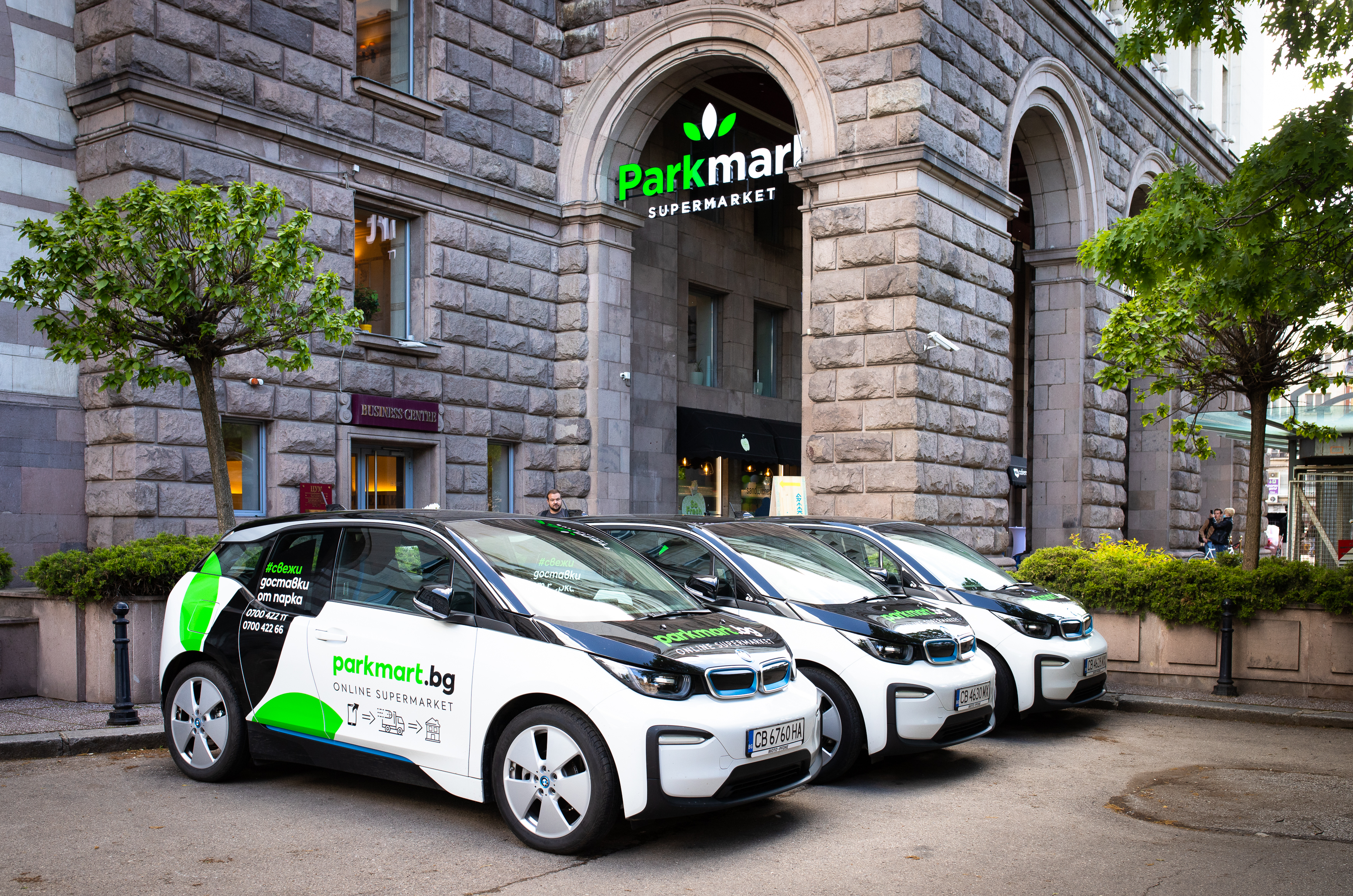
Parkmart Supermarket in TZUM, Sofia, Bulgaria (2021)

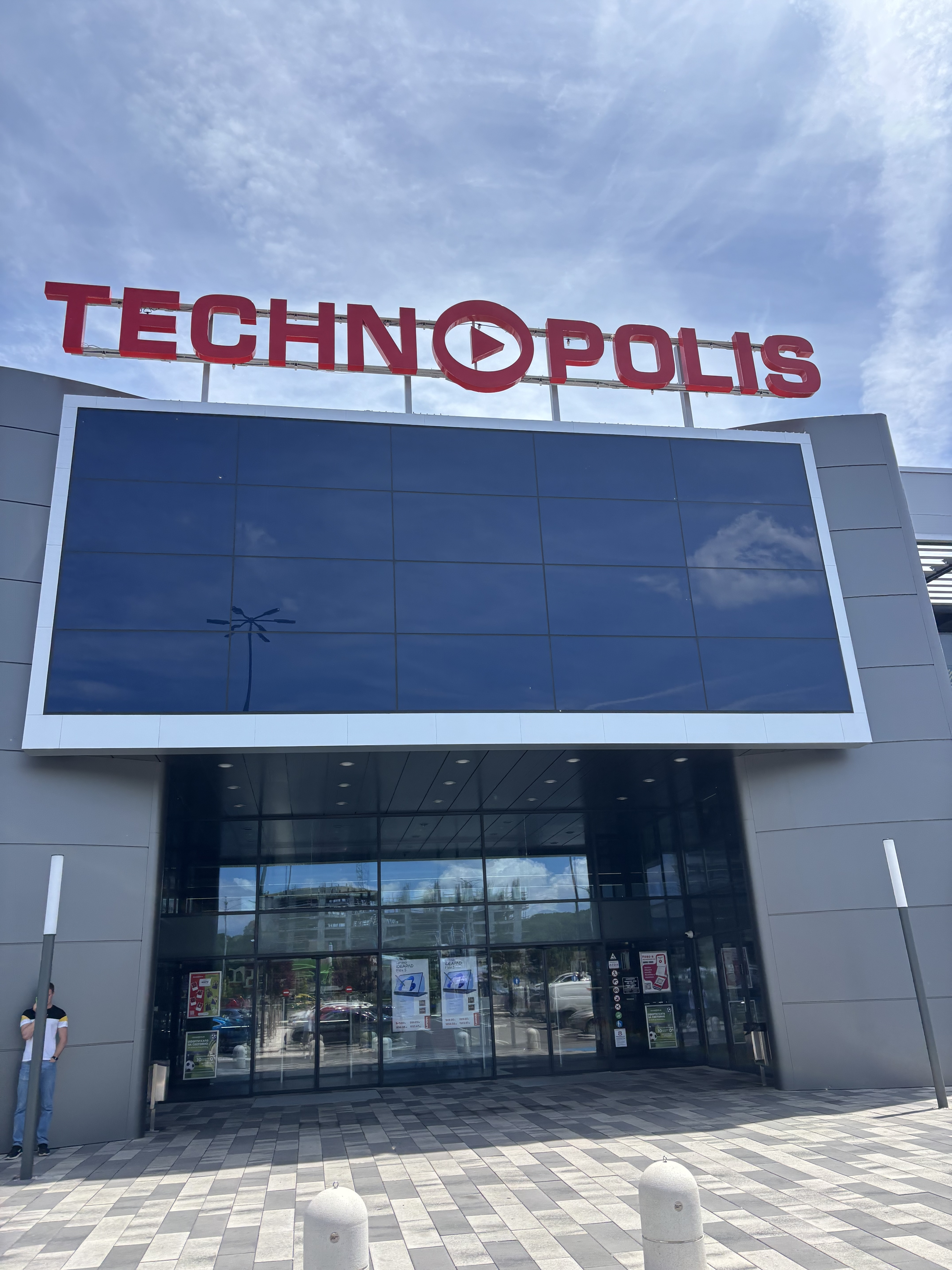
Technopolis 2026, Crasno Celo, Sofia

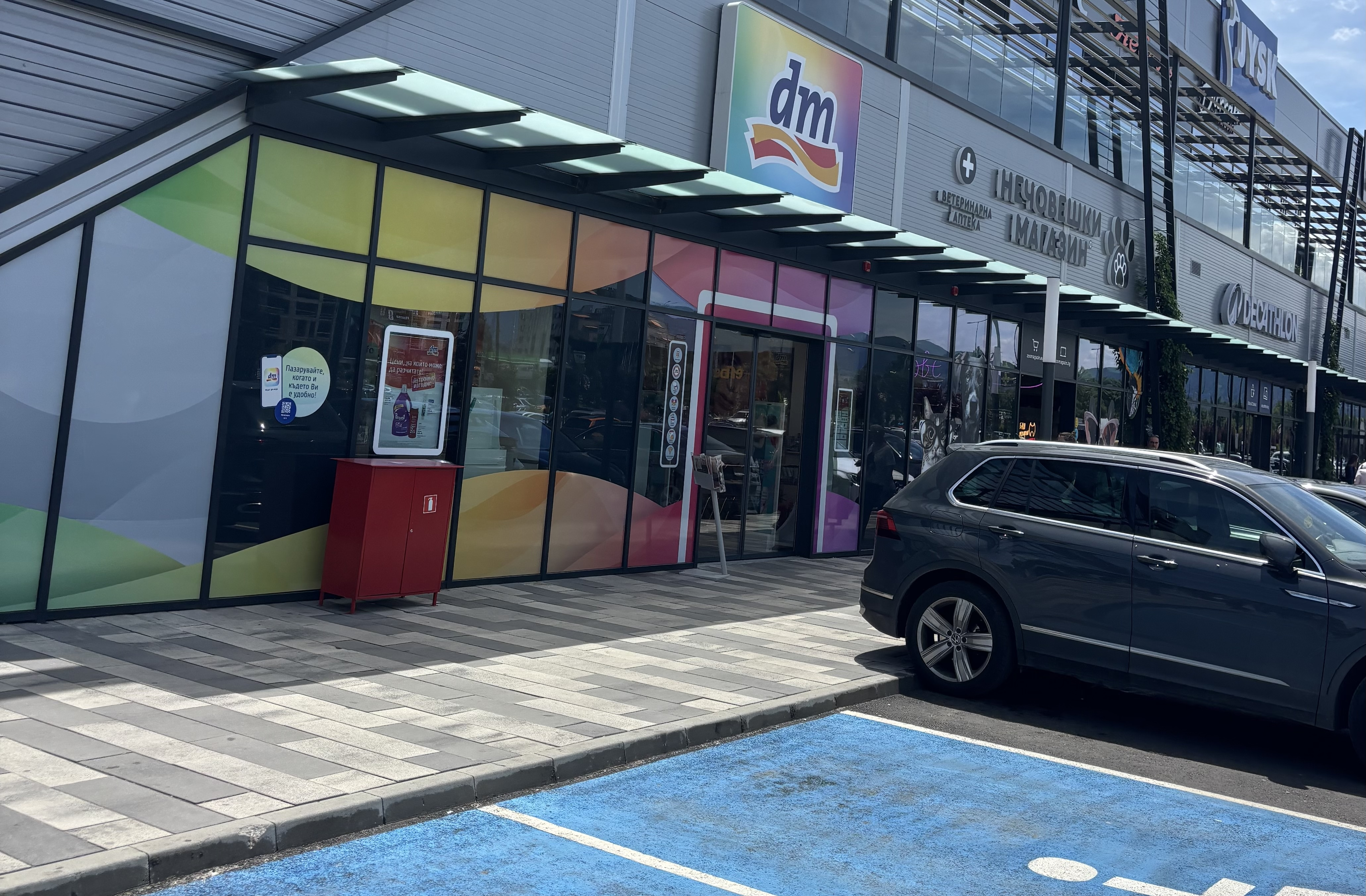
dm, sofia, crasno celo, 2026

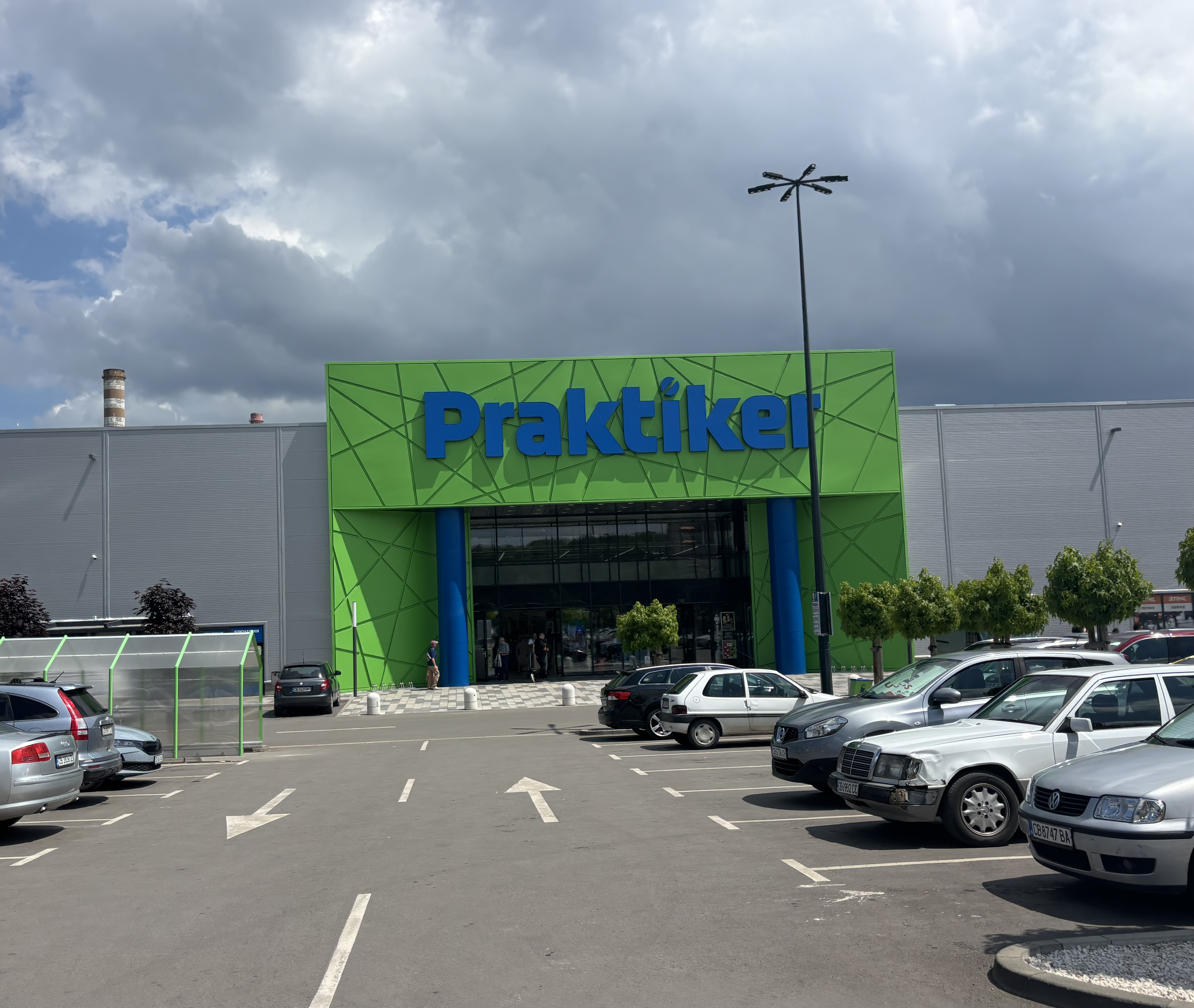
Praktiker

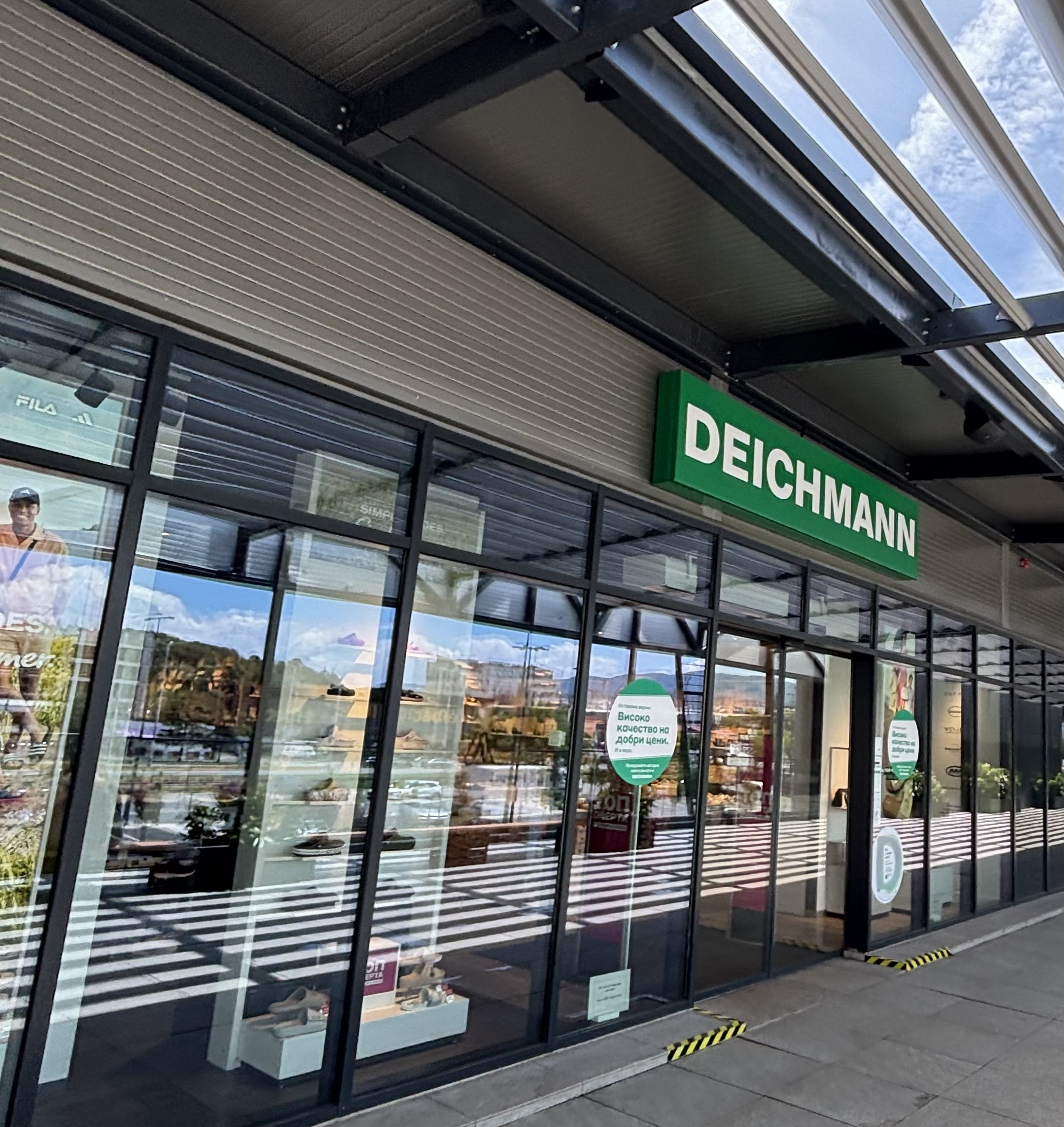
Deichmann

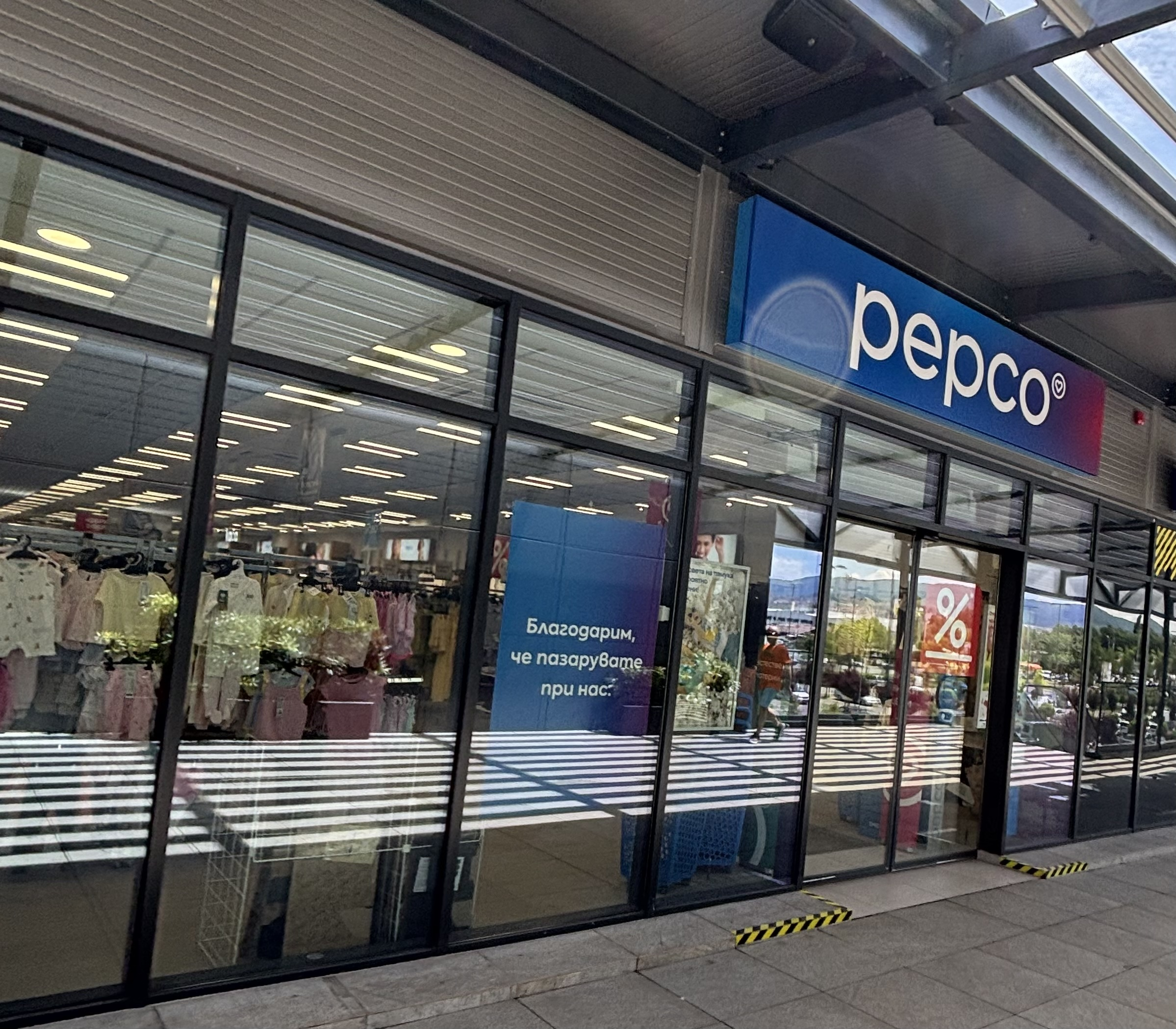
Pepco

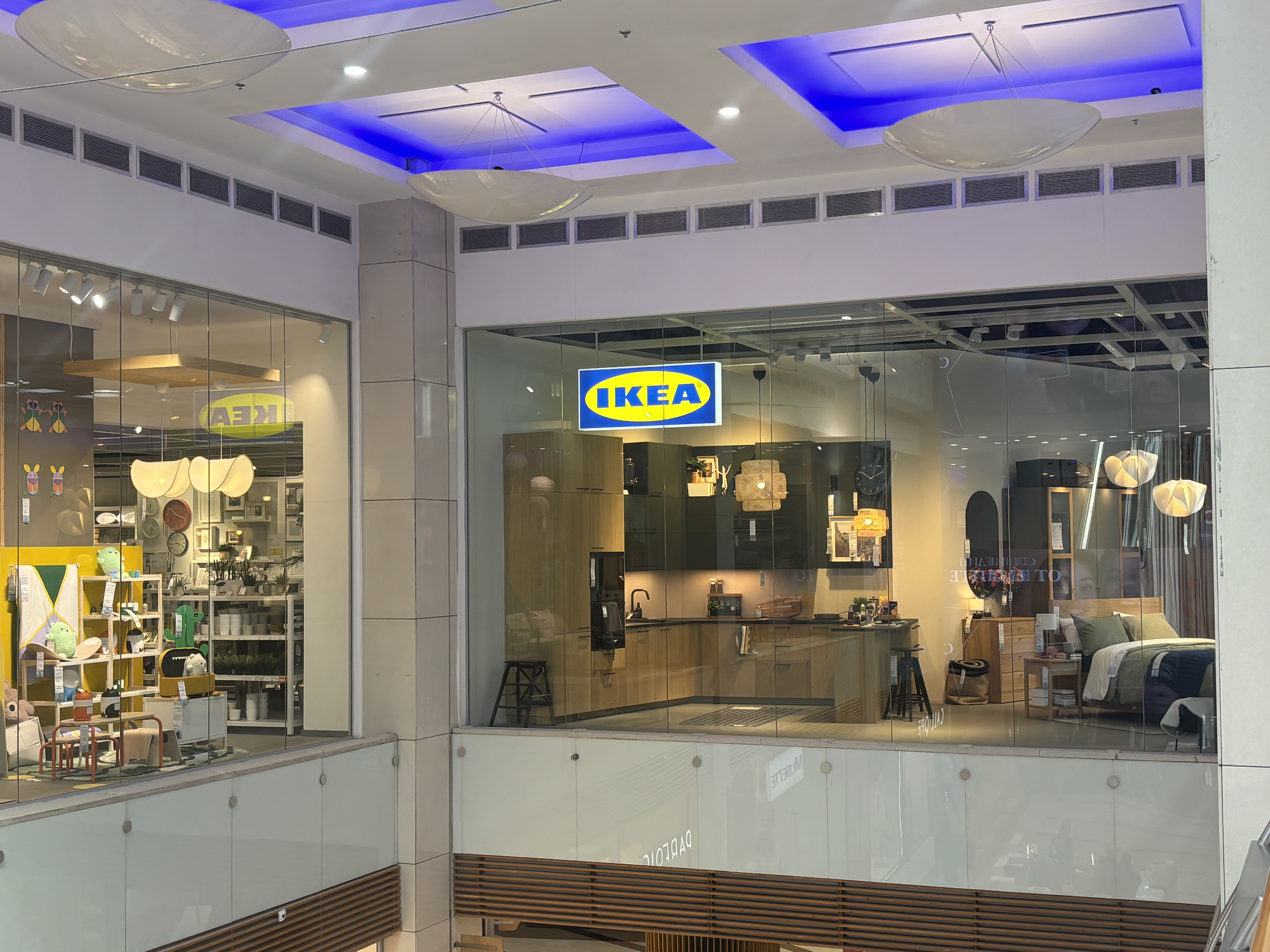
IKEA
