= Fantastico =

Fantastico may refer to:

== Film and television ==
- Fantástico, a Brazilian television newsmagazine
- Fantastico (variety show), an Italian television show
- Miss Kitty Fantastico, a pet kitten in the television series Buffy the Vampire Slayer

== Music ==
- Fantasticos, Dutch schlager musical duo

== Sports ==
- Brian Wohl, also known as WWF wrestler Julio Fantastico
- Robert Anthony, an independent wrestler also known as Egotistico Fantastico

== Others ==
- Fantastico (supermarket chain), a Bulgarian supermarket chain
- Fantastico, the nemesis of superhero Terrifica
