= Pernik =

Pernik Перник
- Town
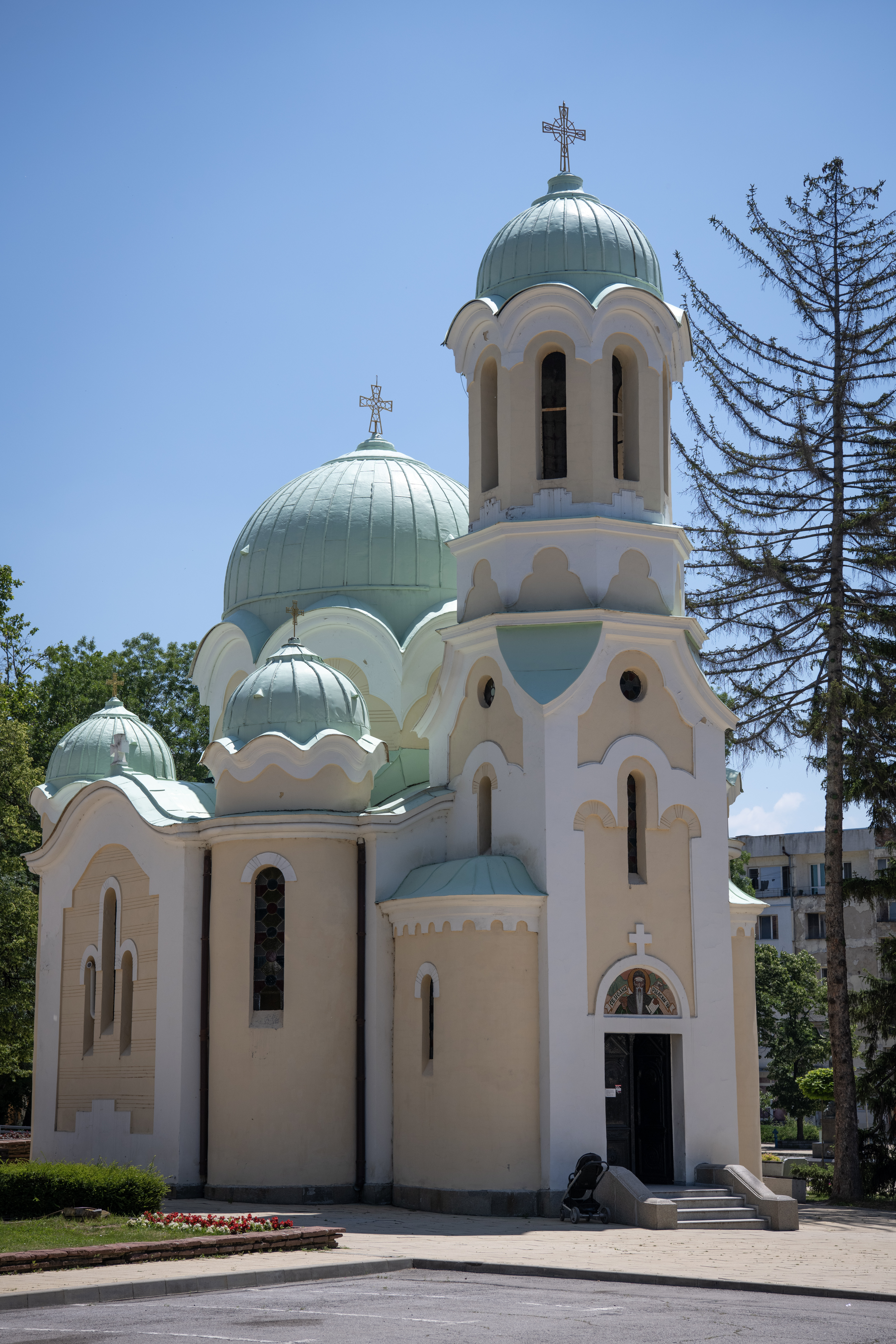

- Flag Coat of arms

- Location of Pernik Pernik (Balkans)
- Coordinates: 42°36′N 23°02′E
- Country: Bulgaria
- Province (Oblast): Pernik

Government
  - Mayor: Stanislav Vladimirov

Area
  - Town: 72.289 km^{2} (27.911 sq mi)
- Elevation: 710 m (2,330 ft)

Population (2020)
  - Town: 75,964
  - Density: 1,050.8/km^{2} (2,721.7/sq mi)
  - Urban: 97,181
- Time zone: UTC+2 (EET)
  - Summer (DST): UTC+3 (EEST)
- Postal Code: 2300
- Area code: 076
- Website: Official website

Pernik (Bulgarian: Перник [ˈpɛrnik]) is a town in western Bulgaria (about 20 kilometres (12 miles) south-west of Sofia) with a population of 70,285 as of 2021. Pernik is the most populated town in western Bulgaria after Sofia. It is the main town of Pernik Province and lies on both banks of the Struma River in the Pernik Valley between the Golo Bardo Mountain, Vitosha Mountain, Lyulin and Viskyar mountains. Pernik is the principal town of Pernik Province – a province in western Bulgaria, which is next to the Serbian border.

Originally the site of a Thracian fortress founded in the 4th century BC, and later a Roman settlement, Pernik became part of the Bulgarian Empire in the early 9th century as an important fortress. The medieval town was a key Bulgarian stronghold during Bulgarian tsar Samuil's wars against the Byzantine Empire in the 11th century, when it was governed by the local noble Krakra of Pernik, withstanding Byzantine sieges a number of times.

From 1396 until 1878 the town was under Ottoman rule. In the 20th century Pernik developed rapidly as a centre for coal mining and heavy industry. During the Communist rule of Bulgaria it was called Dimitrovo between 1949 and 1962 after Bulgarian Communist leader Georgi Dimitrov.

The Surva International Festival of the Masquerade Games (simply called Surva) is held in the town every January. Surva is an International Kukeri Festival in Pernik, Bulgaria and is one of the biggest masquerade festival on the Balkans and Eastern Europe. It is held in the last three days of January each year.

Economically Pernik is an industrial town. Industry is of vital importance for the economy of the province. Pernik is the major manufacturing centre, one of the largest in the country with the Stomana steel complex; heavy machinery (mining and industrial equipment); brown coals, building materials and textiles being the most important. Near Pernik there is an enormous plant for heavy machinery in smaller town Radomir which produces excavators and industrial equipment, but is currently not working at full capacity. Pernik has two football teams, PFC Minyor Pernik and FC Metalurg Pernik.

== Etymology ==
The name Pernik is thought to have originated from that of Slavic god of thunder and lightning Perun or from a local boyar named Perin + the Slavic placename suffix –nik (or –ik) added, and was first mentioned in the 9th century.

== Geography ==
Pernik is the second largest town in western Bulgaria. The town is located in the Pernik Valley. part of the ethnographic region of Graovo, at an altitude between 700 and 850 metres (2,297 and 2,789 feet), length of 22 kilometres (14 miles) and is surrounded by mountains Vitosha, Lyulin and Golo Bardo. Through the city flows the river Struma, which rises from Cherni Vrah – one of the largest rivers in the country with a total length of 2,290 over sea level. The total area is 28,863 acres (11,680 ha). Pernik is situated 30 kilometres (19 miles) southwest of the Bulgarian capital, Sofia. The territory of the town has many major roads, including Pan-European Corridor VIII and Pan-European Corridor IV – European route E79 /with Struma motorway and Lyulin motorway/, which connects Central Europe and Greece. Pernik has five railway stations and railway stops. The town lies close to one of the oldest trade routes in the Balkans, which ran from Sofia to Dubrovnik, via Skopje, Pristina, Sarajevo and Mostar.

=== Climate ===
Pernik is in moderate-continental climate zone. Climatic conditions are influenced by the relatively high altitude – 750 m, but also by the fact that Pernik is in between mountains, which creates a specific micro-climate. Spring comes relatively late – in late March and early April. The average spring temperature is 10 °C (50 °F). Summer seasonal average temperature is about 22 °C (72 °F). The hottest month is July – an average monthly temperature 22.5 °C (73 °F). The absolute maximum temperature is 38.2 °C (101 °F). Autumn is warmer than spring, with seasonal average temperature of 11.2 °C (52 °F).

Climate data for Pernik, Bulgaria
Month	Jan	Feb	Mar	Apr	May	Jun	Jul	Aug	Sep	Oct	Nov	Dec	Year
Record high °C (°F)	15.2 (59.4)	19.1 (66.4)	29 (84)	30 (86)	33.1 (91.6)	34.7 (94.5)	38.2 (100.8)	37.5 (99.5)	34.5 (94.1)	32.2 (90.0)	23.2 (73.8)	17.4 (63.3)	38.2 (100.8)
Mean daily maximum °C (°F)	4.0 (39.2)	5.6 (42.1)	11.1 (52.0)	17.2 (63.0)	22.5 (72.5)	26.5 (79.7)	29.3 (84.7)	29.5 (85.1)	24.0 (75.2)	18.3 (64.9)	11.8 (53.2)	4.7 (40.5)	17.2 (63.0)
Daily mean °C (°F)	−0.8 (30.6)	1.0 (33.8)	5.4 (41.7)	11.2 (52.2)	16.0 (60.8)	20.0 (68.0)	22.5 (72.5)	22.5 (72.5)	17.8 (64.0)	12.0 (53.6)	6.9 (44.4)	0.7 (33.3)	11.3 (52.3)
Mean daily minimum °C (°F)	−4.5 (23.9)	−3.5 (25.7)	0.8 (33.4)	5.1 (41.2)	9.5 (49.1)	12.6 (54.7)	14.5 (58.1)	14.5 (58.1)	10.5 (50.9)	5.6 (42.1)	2.0 (35.6)	−2.3 (27.9)	5.4 (41.7)
Record low °C (°F)	−26.8 (−16.2)	−26.5 (−15.7)	−21.5 (−6.7)	−6.4 (20.5)	−3.6 (25.5)	1.7 (35.1)	3.5 (38.3)	3.5 (38.3)	−3 (27)	−4.9 (23.2)	−14.6 (5.7)	−18.7 (−1.7)	−26.8 (−16.2)
Average precipitation mm (inches)	43 (1.7)	37 (1.5)	37 (1.5)	53 (2.1)	71 (2.8)	77 (3.0)	48 (1.9)	39 (1.5)	43 (1.7)	52 (2.0)	56 (2.2)	48 (1.9)	604 (23.8)
Source: Stringmeteo

StringMeteo.com » Начало

== History ==
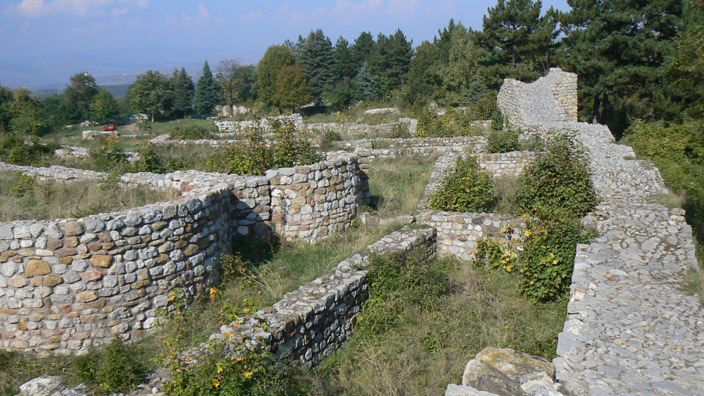
The medieval Bulgarian fortress of Krakra, overlooking the town

Pernik is a successor of a medieval town of an unknown name, falsely named Krakra (after Krakra of Pernik).

In the 4th century, the Thracians built a fortress there. There is a rich collection of archaeological findings that evidence the existence of a settlement in the late Neolithic. The richest collection of pottery in the Central Balkans dates from that time. It is kept in the Historical Museum. The ancient Greek historian Thucydides wrote that in the territory of Pernik lives the Thracian tribe of Agrianes. The author mentions them in describing tells about the march of the Odrysaean King Sitalces against Macedonia in 429 BC. Other Thracian tribes in the area were granite and ileitis. Their main city is called Adeva (Adeβa), on whose ruins was built Pernik.

An exhibition of reliefs and sculptures is kept there, dedicated to the health-giving gods Asclepius and Hygieia, held in reverence in this region because of the presence of mineral springs.

Bulgarians took advantage of the fortified spot and built one of the mightiest Bulgarian strongholds — Pernik. At the beginning of the 11th century the settlement was a fortress, impenetrable to the Byzantines. It was the seat of the legendary governor Krakra of Pernik, who played an important role in the time of the First Bulgarian Empire. In 1004, he bravely defended their fortress and several times stop the offensive of the Byzantine Emperor Basil II (popularly known as the Bulgar-slayer) to Serdika. After long fighting, Krakra caused severe damage to the Byzantine army and forced them to withdraw from his area. In 1016 Basil II again try to attack Pernik. After 88-day siege and numerous losses Byzantine Emperor was conquered the city. In 1017 Krakra gathered a great army combined Pechenegs. Both army forces were preparing to strike at Byzantium to reoccupy the lands between the Danube and the Stara Planina against the Eastern Romans.

Constantinople bribed Pechenegs and they break up the union with Bulgarians.

After the death of Tsar Ivan Vladislav in 1018, who left no apparent heirs to the throne, Krakra successfully negotiated with the Byzantines. Today Pernik Fortress is one of the largest historic landmarks.

In the time of the Ottoman occupation Pernik lost its significance as a fortress because it was located deep in the interior. In the town had not settled any other ethnic groups, except Bulgarians and the population lives relatively calm in recent centuries. Until after the Liberation of Bulgaria Pernik was a small stockbreeding village, consisting of several scattered hamlets.

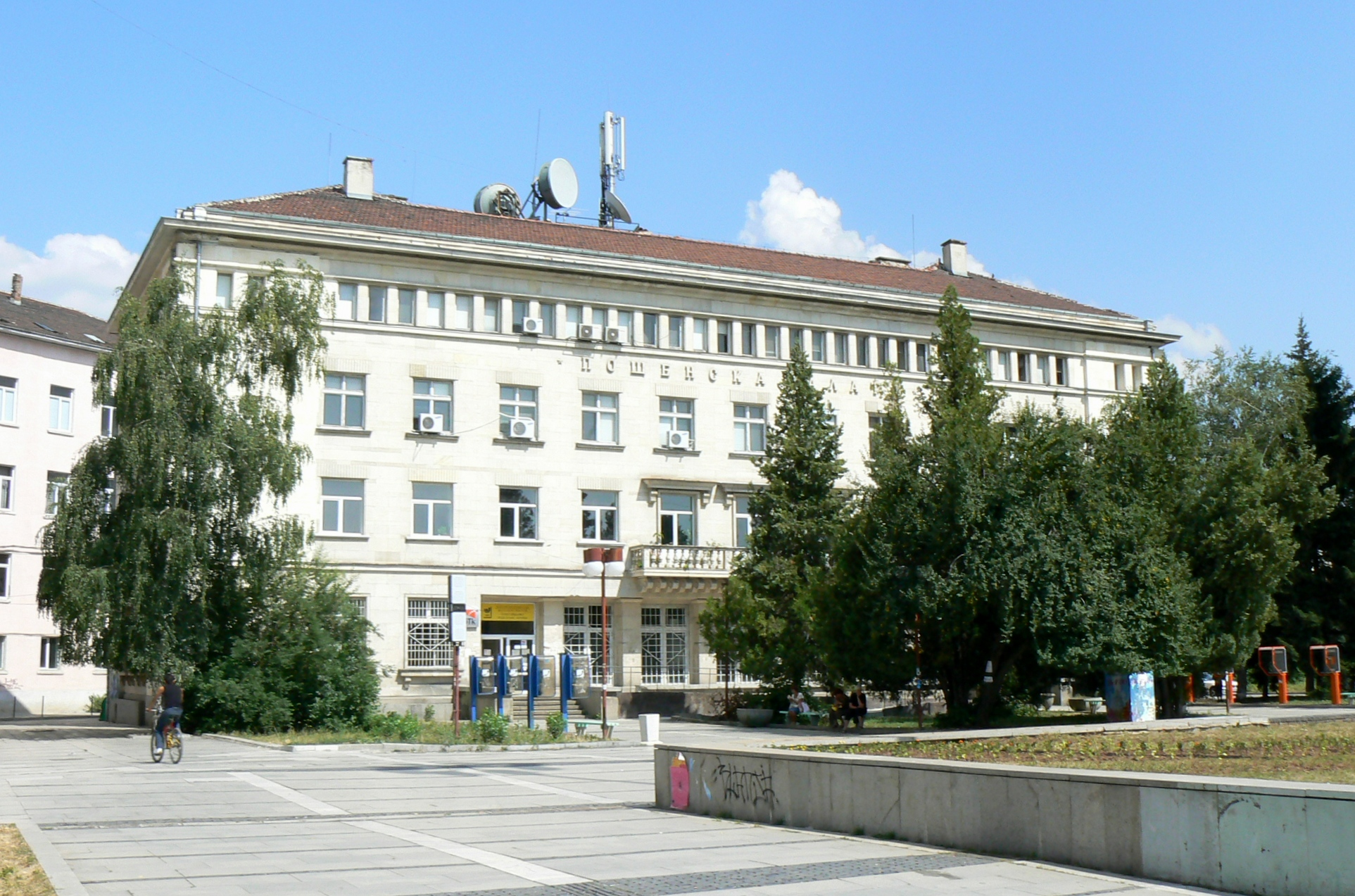
Central post office

The beginning of Pernik's modern history is set in the 20th century with the development of the rich coal-beds of the region. According to some scientists, the existence of coal was already known in the 10th and 11th centuries. Before their industrial exploitation started, the local people dug it up with picks and shovels and transported coal with carts and wheelbarrows. Pernik's rapid development is associated with the large shipments of coal to the capital city, intended for household needs and for the railroad transport. Until then, coal for the railroads and the river and sea steamboats was delivered from as far as Cardiff in the United Kingdom.

As the first miners' quarters were built on the terraces of the Struma River, the beginning of the miners' settlement of Pernik was set, one kilometre (0.62 miles) to the east of the village of the same name. It is a town since 1929, and since 1958 — a regional centre. The coal output reached its apogee at that time. Pernik has been an energy centre of Bulgaria for a few decades.

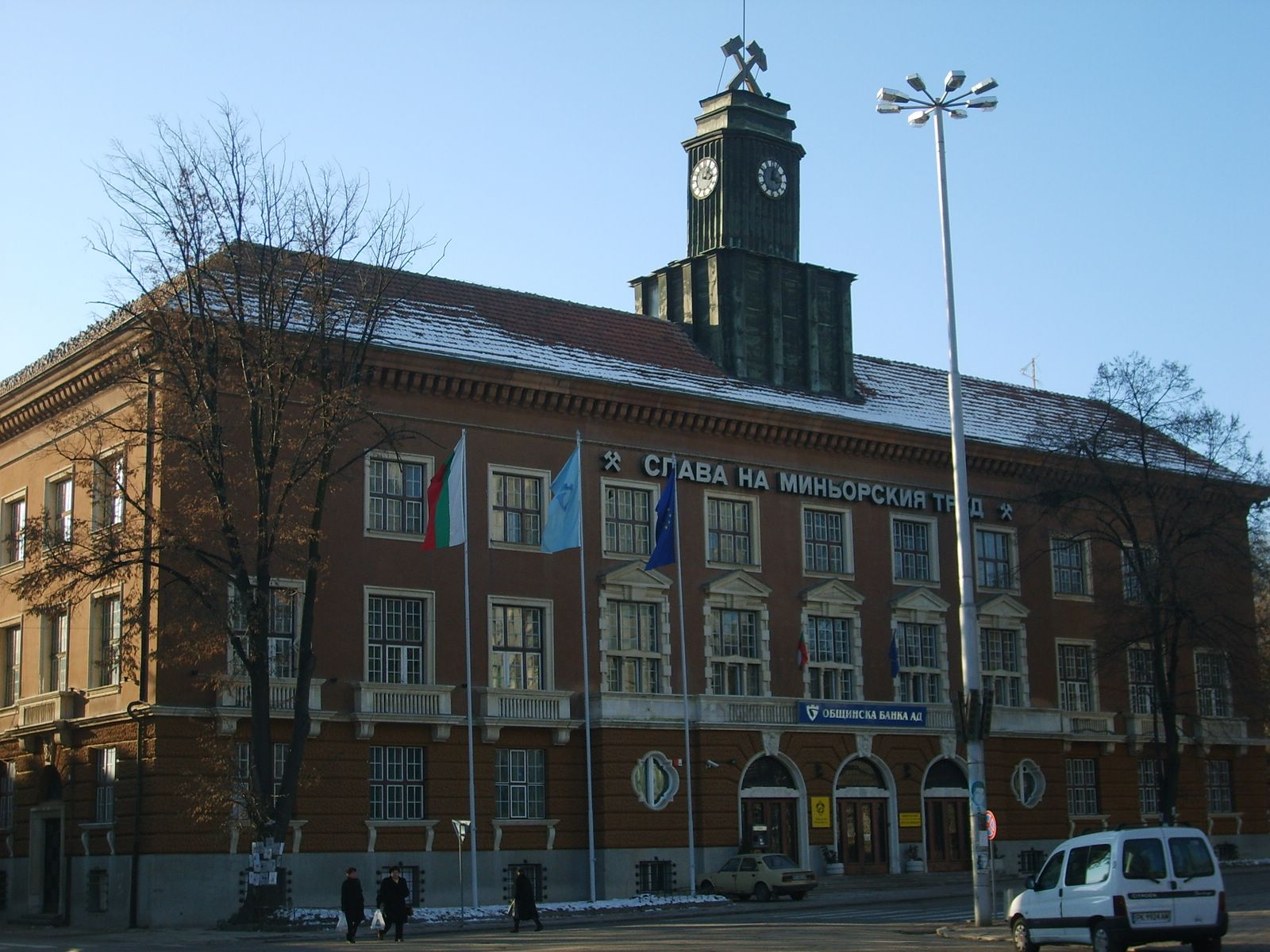
The Central Mining Office

== Population ==
According to the 2021 census, Pernik has population of 70,285 people.

Historical population
Year	Pop.	±%
1934	15,844	—
1946	28,545	+80.2%
1956	59,930	+109.9%
1965	75,840	+26.5%
1975	87,408	+15.3%
1985	94,758	+8.4%
1992	90,549	−4.4%
2001	85,991	−5.0%
2011	80,191	−6.7%
2021	68,259	−14.9%
Source: Censuses

== Downtown ==
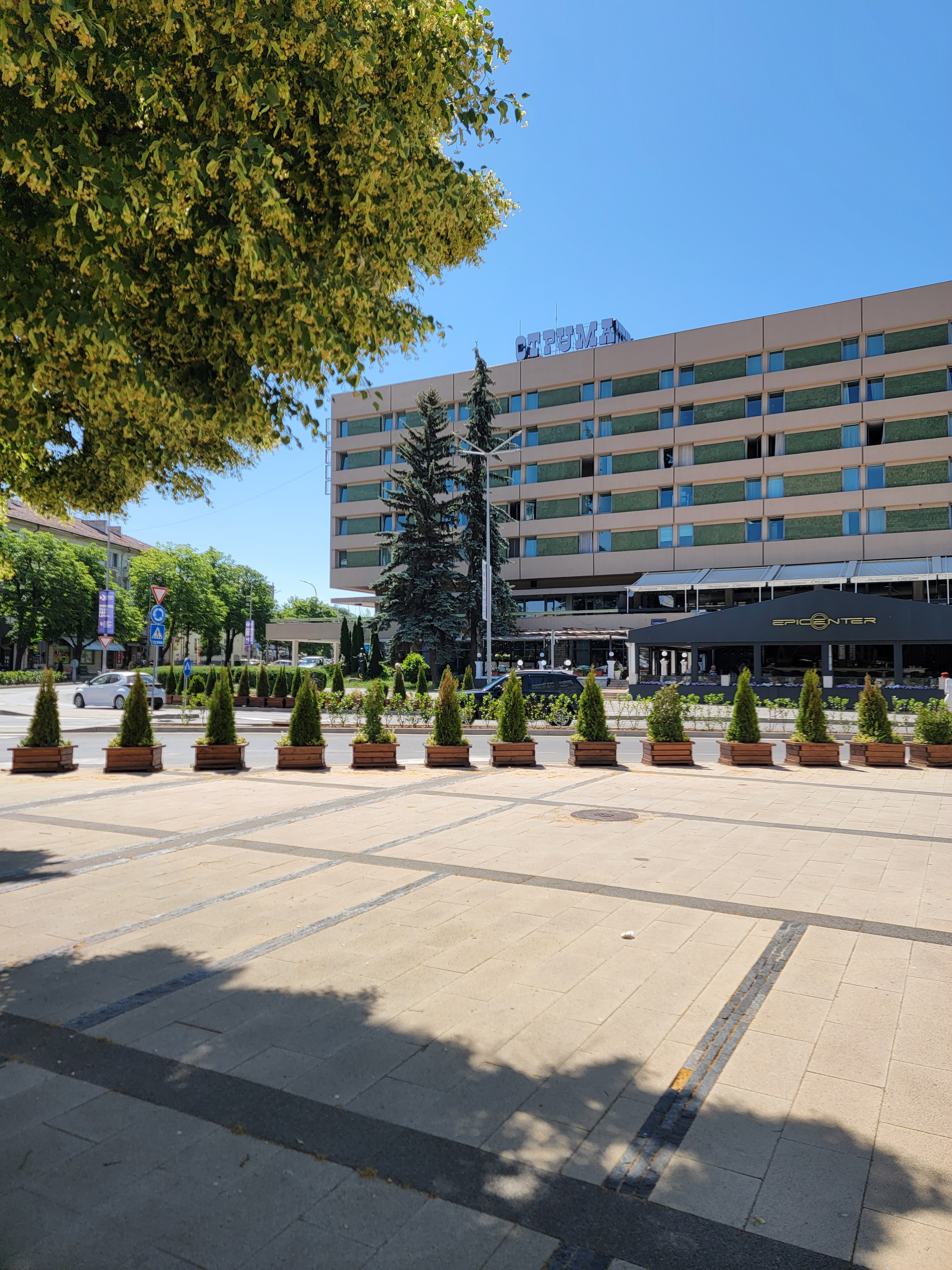
Hotel Struma

Downtown area of Pernik has been improving in recent years under the new local leadership.

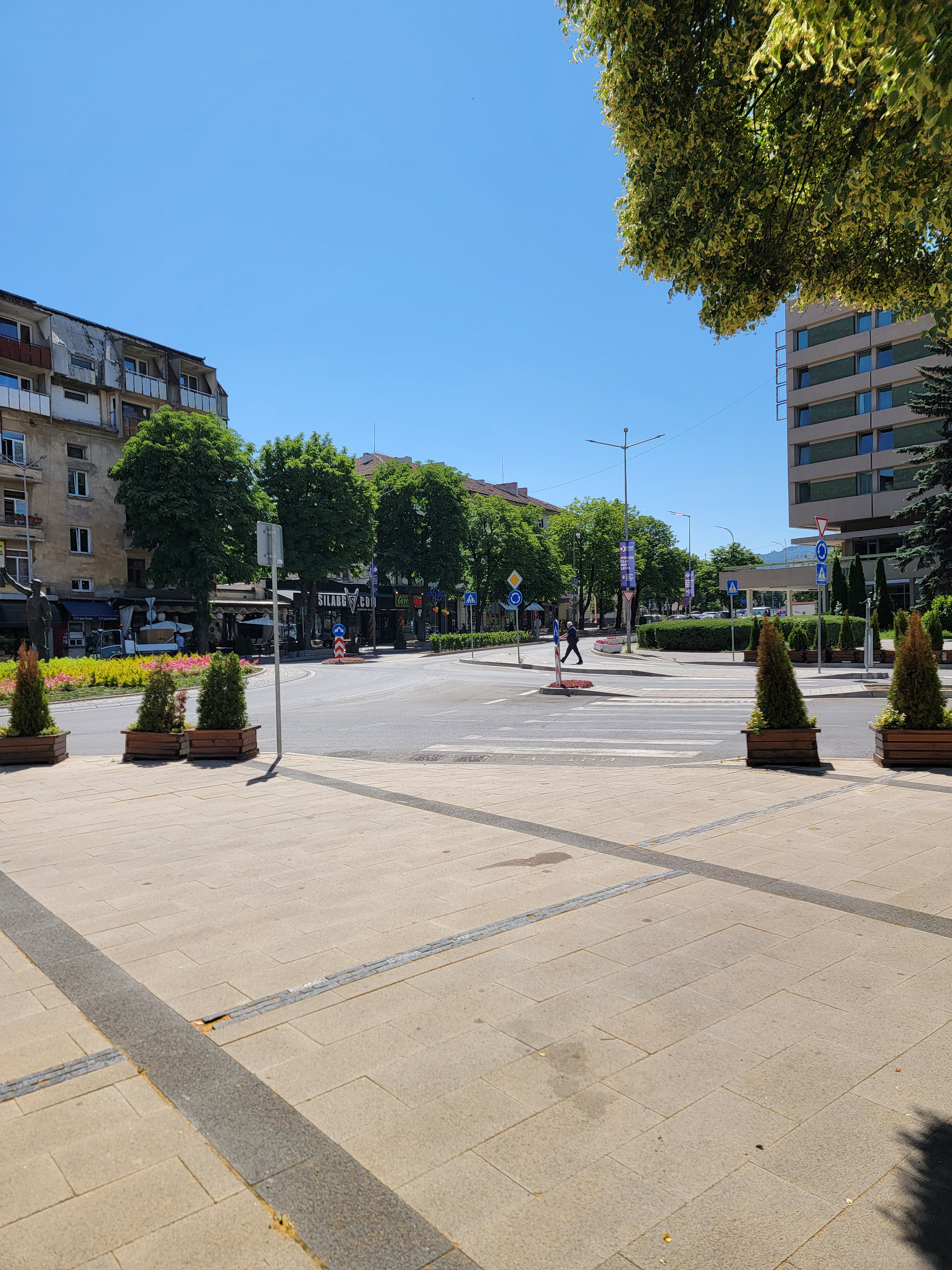

=== Ethnic, linguistic and religious composition ===
According to the 2011 census data, the individuals who declared their ethnic identity were distributed as follows:

- Bulgarians: 73,063 (97.1%)
- Gypsies: 1,709 (2.3%)
- Turks: 78 (0.1%)
- Others: 183 (0.2%)
- Indefinable: 218 (0.3%)
  - Undeclared: 4,940 (6.2%)

Total: 80,191

There is not very large concentration of Gypsies within the city limits as the Gypsies are 1,709 in the city and 1,781 in the municipality, while the Bulgarians are 73,063 in the city and 88,831 in the municipality. The Eastern Orthodox Christian is the predominant religion.

== Landmarks ==
- Palace of Culture – Pernik – urban theater halls, orchestras, library, ensembles for folk songs and dances and more.
- Regional History Museum – Pernik
- Underground Mining Museum – Pernik
- Krakra's fortress – stronghold
- Duhlata cave – the longest in Bulgaria. Duhlata – with input from the southern slopes of Vitosha Mountain is the longest cave in Bulgaria (17,600 m.) and deep 53 meters. A complex multi labyrinth system located on 6 floors.
- Necropolis archaeological Thracian tribe Agrianes from 8th to 4th centuries BC – about 20 km south of Pernik to Struma motorway near the village of Dren. Necropolis was discovered in early 2012 during the excavation of the highway. Unique necropolis discovered in archaeological finds of gold Thracian treasure from breastplates, earrings, hairpins, jewelry and articles of silver and amber, which are stored in the Historical Museum of Pernik. Thracian sanctuary is included in the ranking "The Wonders of Bulgaria" 2013.
- Mountain Golo Bardo, immediately above city Pernik. Golo Bardo separating Pernik and Radomir valleys, in which the nature reserve "Ostritsa".
- Holy water area – karst spring "Living Water" is near Vitosha village Bosnek. From his fountain of happiness, according to tradition of the 17th century, drank only the righteous, "but sinners refused."
- Nature Reserve "Ostritsa" is located on the slopes of Mount Ostritza in Golo Bardo Mountain. It is among the oldest protected areas in Bulgaria.
- "Nightingale" hut in Golo Bardo, just above the city.
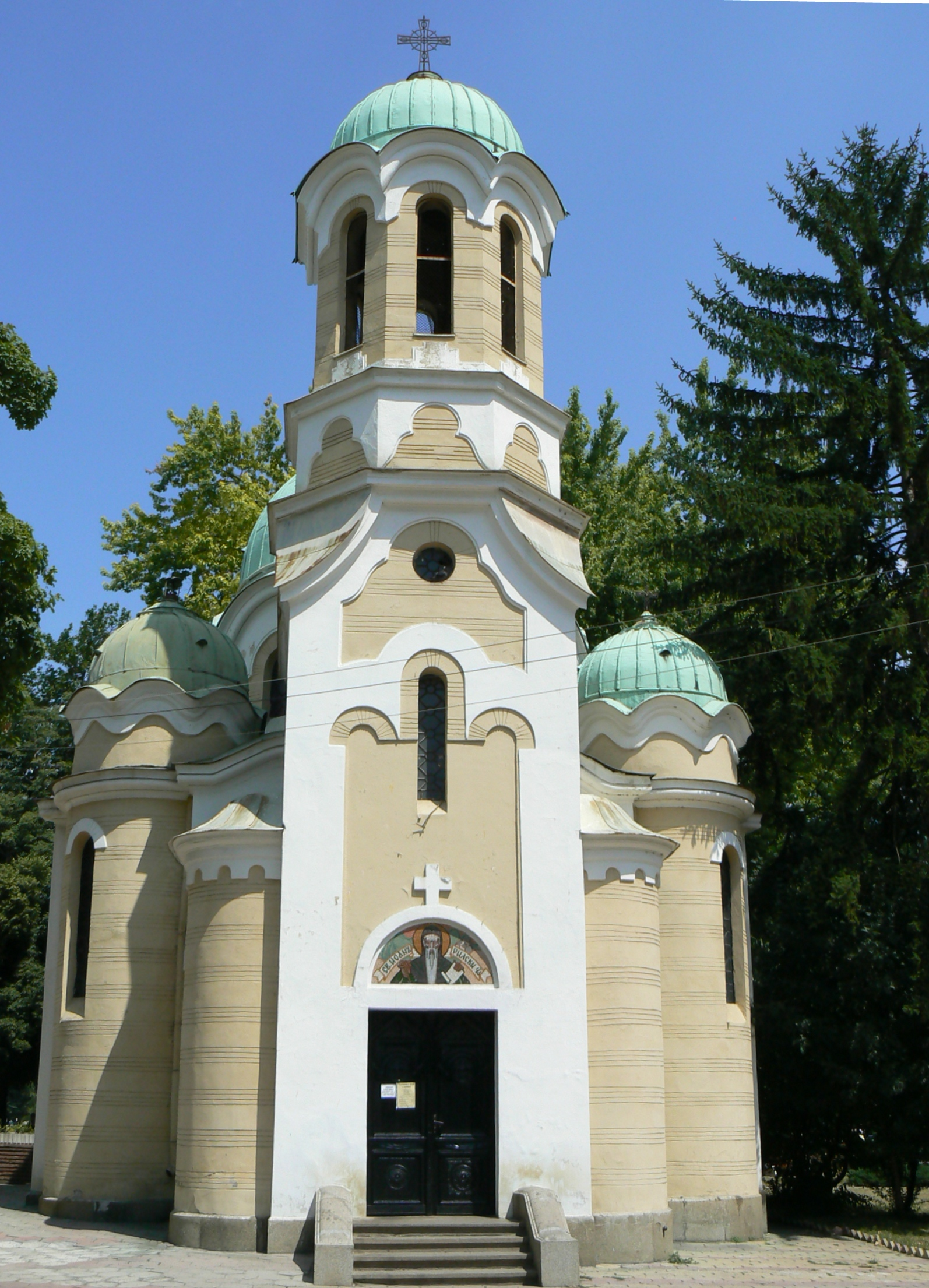
  The Church of St. Ivan of Rila
- Sacred pit of Garlo – is an archaeological site located near the village of Garlo in Pernik District.
- Lyulin Mountain to the north of Pernik. Come on the road to the villages Divotino and Liulin. Mountainside is located Divotinski Monastery "Holy Trinity".
- Church of "St. John of Rila" – Pernik
- Church "St. George" – str. "Cherkovna", district "Stoneware"
- Church "St. Prophet Elijah" – neighborhood "Moshino"
- Church "Saint Nicholas" – neighborhood "Church"
- Church "Assumption" /"Uspenie Bogorodichno"/ – neighborhood "Iztok" /"East"/
- Monastery "St. George the Conqueror" – neighborhood "White Water" /"Bela Voda"/
- Monastery "St. Petka" – neighborhood "Kalkas"
- Monastery "St. Panteleimon" – the area in the lung hospital in Golo Bardo mountain
- Church "St. Spas" – neighborhood "Varos" at the foot of the fortress area Obrochishte (ruins of an ancient temple)
- St. Peter & Pavel Monastery, Odranitza. (25 km north of Zemen)

== Notable natives ==
- Krakra of Pernik
- Georgi Dimitrov, politician
- Georgi Parvanov, president of Bulgaria – 2001–2011
- Zdravka Evtimova, writer
- Boyan Radev – wrestler, two-time Olympic champion, World champion, three-time Sportsperson of the year in Bulgaria
- Ivo Angelov – wrestler, World champion, Sportsperson of the year in Bulgaria – 2013
- Yoto Yotov, weightlifter, 1992 and 1996 Olympics silver medalist, three-time World champion
- Georgi Ananiev – politician, ex Defense Minister
- Roman Vasilev – IT expert, ex Minister of Government – 2013
- Milko Kovachev – politician, Energy Minister
- Botyo Tachkov, US, German and Columbia university professor, president of a Wall Street investment bank, worker in the US Department of State, the United Nations and the World Bank, writer, awarded with Eleonore Roosevelt and Fulbright prizes.
- Romel Ivanov, athlete, national champion 1500 and 800 m.
- Valentin Khristov, athlete, weightlifting 1980 Olympics silver medalist
- Kiril Ivkov – football player, two-time the best Bulgarian player of the year, silver Olympic medalist from 1968.
- Pavel Vladimirov – football player, striker. Bronze medalist at the Olympics in 1956. Longtime captain of the "Minyor Pernik", finalist for the national cup in 1958 with "Minyor Pernik". Topscorer of group "A" in 1956 with 16 goals scored.
- Vladislav Stoyanov – national football player – goalkeeper
- Velizar Dimitrov, football player
- Boris Gyuderov – ex volleyball player, national player
- Nikolay Vasilev Ivanov – ex volleyball player, national player
- Todor Asenov Skrimov – national volleyball player
- Penka Metodieva – ex national basketball player – Olympic vice-champion at the 1980 – Moscow and bronze medal winner at the 1976 – Montreal.
- Evladiya Slavcheva – ex national basketball player – Olympic vice-champion at the 1980 – Moscow.
- Milka Mihaylova – athlete, multiple winner of the marathon in Sofia and other foreign marathons

== Culture ==
=== Religion ===
The most practiced religion in Pernik and its adjacent territories is Eastern Orthodoxy. The majority of the city's residents (over 95%) declare that they are of Bulgarian origin. There are no mosques, synagogues or Catholic churches in the area. In Pernik region there are over 60 functioning and 20 inactive Orthodox churches.

There is an Evangelical Pentecostal church on the territory of the town, which was founded in 1920. It has been a member of the Union of Evangelical Pentecostal Churches in Bulgaria since 1931. The church is located at 10 Aleko Konstantinov Street.

=== Libraries ===
The largest documentary book depository and the main reference and local history center in the region is the Svetoslav Minkov Library. The library fund is about 292,000 library units. It was established in 1955 as a city public library. She started her activity with her transfer to the Palace of Culture in 1957. In 1983 she was awarded the Order of Cyril and Methodius I degree and named after the great Bulgarian writer Svetoslav Minkov. The library organizes exhibitions and literary meetings with publishers and authors. Since 2007, with Decree No. 80 of April 7, 2006 of the Ministry of Culture, the library has changed its status from the UNB to the Republic of Bulgaria and leaves the structure of the Municipal Complex "Palace of Culture".

=== Drama Theater ===
The Municipal Drama Theater of Pernik was founded in 1919 and is named after the actor Boyan Danovski. It was once housed in the Palace of Culture, where it has a modern stage, a hall for 500 spectators, very good opportunities for artistic lighting and musical design. Due to a short circuit in 2004, the theater hall was destroyed by fire, but the theater continues to be visited in a smaller hall in the United Children's Complex. Subsequently, the burned hall was completely repaired and modernized. Since 2013, the theater returns to the hall of the Palace of Culture. The theater has been awarded many national prizes, including the prize of the Union of Bulgarian Artists for an overall performance. The most famous directors, artists and performers worked on his stage: Leon Daniel, Krikor Azaryan, Hristo Hristov, Zdravko Mitkov. The director of the theater in the period 1977-1990 was the famous Bulgarian actor Georgi Rusev.

== Surva ==
Surva is a three-day festival celebrating the folklore traditions and masquerade arts from different communities across Bulgaria and the world. The festival heavily features Kukeri - people dressed as monsters with many bells attached to their outfits. The sight of the monsters and the sound of the bells is designed to scare away evil spirits.

The festival takes place in the centre of Pernik and attracts thousands of visitors.

== Education ==
The first Bulgarian private technical university was established in 2010 in Pernik. The university was founded in close cooperation with nationally established industry partners. The European Polytechnical University offers Bachelor, Masters and PhD degrees in architecture, engineering and entrepreneurship among others. The university is aiming internationally and offers all courses bilingually in Bulgarian and English languages. Now the city operates 11 elementary schools and 14 High Schools – High School for learning foreign languages, Economy high school, Mathematics High School, school sports and other.

== Events ==
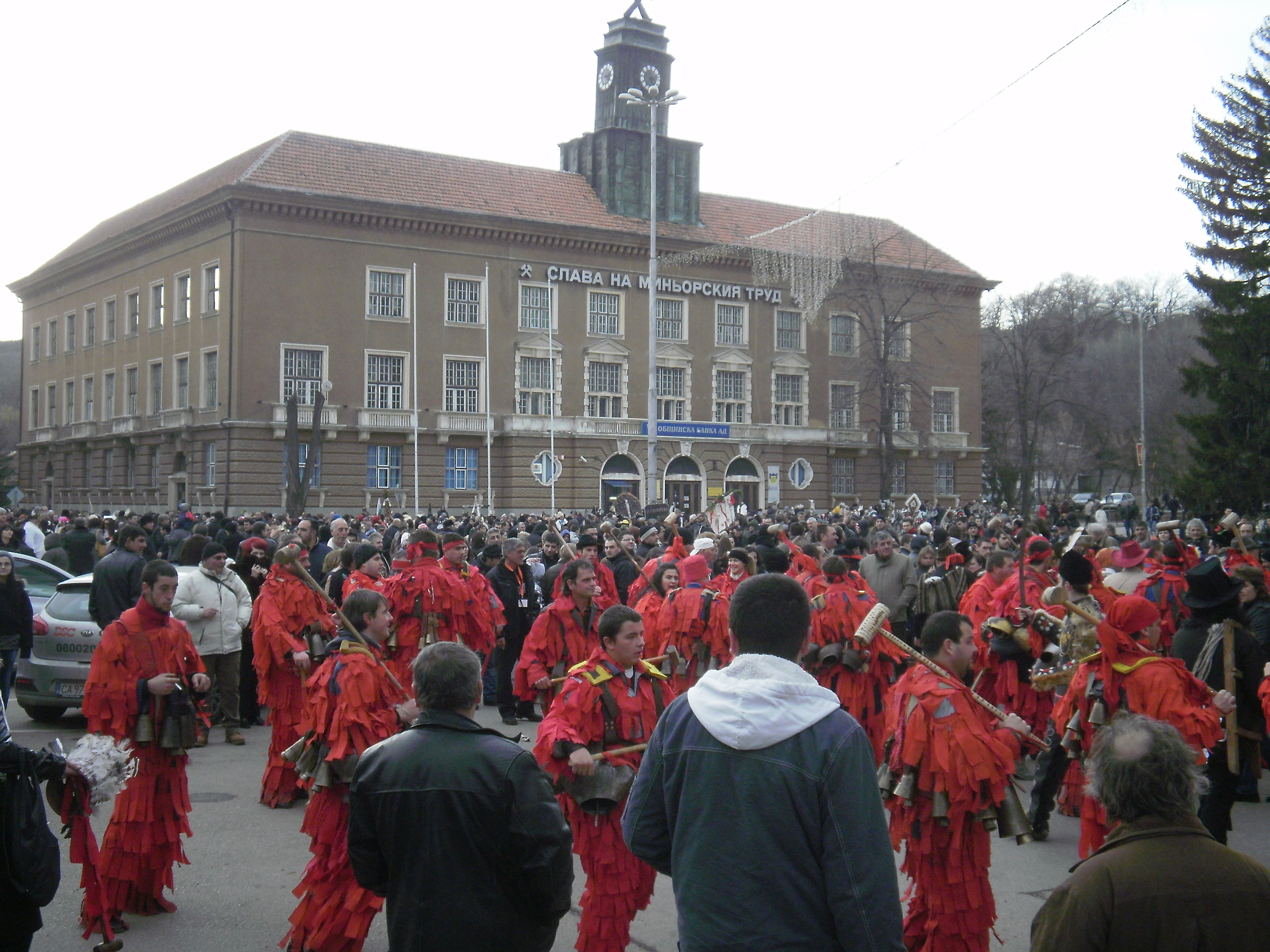
Surva Festival

January

Surva is an international Kukeri Festival in Pernik, Bulgaria. One of the biggest masquerade festival on the Balkans and Eastern Europe. Conducted in the last three days of January.

Kukeri or Surva Festival (Mummer's games) in the town of Pernik, is the most spectacular "Kukeri" event in Bulgaria. At the end of January thousands of "kukeri" participants from different regions of Bulgaria, as well as from all around the world gather in Pernik for the three-day event. Kukeri is a pagan Bulgarian tradition of Thracian origins – in ancient times the old Thracians held the Kukeri (Mummers’) Ritual Games in honour of god Dionysus. The Kukeri games are performed by men only, dressed in colourful hand-made costumes and wearing scary masks. Each has also a leather belt around the waist with huge copper bells attached to it. The Kuker's masks are decorated with threads, ribbons, laces and usually represent animals like goats, bulls, rams, or even chicken. Some of the masks are double-faced. On one of the sides, the nose is snubbed and the face is good-humored, on the other side, the nose is hooked and the face is ominous. Those masks symbolize the good and the bad which co-exist in the world.

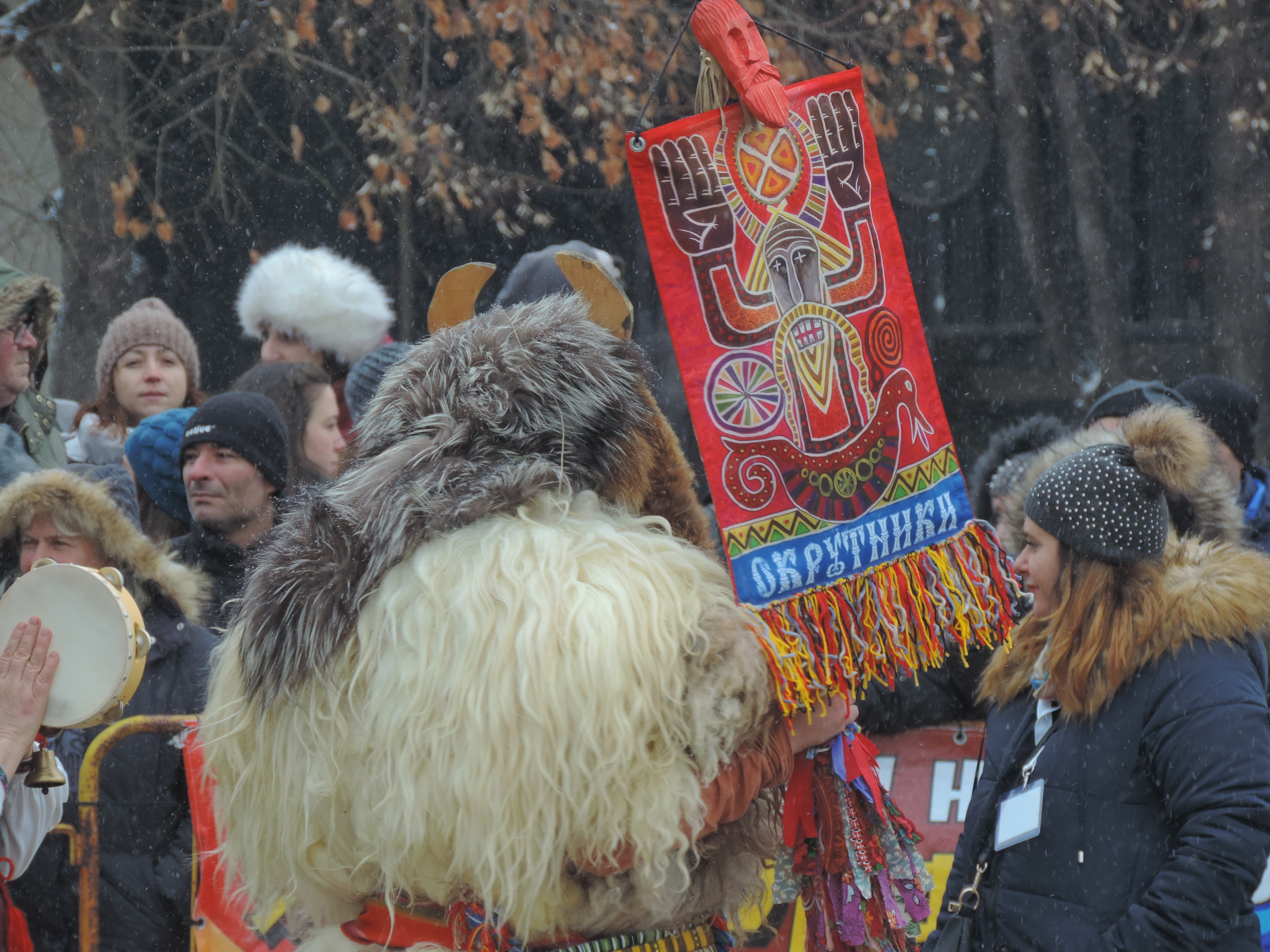
Surva Festival in 2019

A very important thing for the symbolic meaning of the masks are the decoration colors. Red is the most used color – symbolizes fertility of the reviving nature, the sun and the fire; the black color represents Mother Earth and white is a symbol of water and light. The Kukers walk around, jump and dance special magic dances to scare away the evil spirits, to celebrate the beginning of the spring and hopes for a good harvest, health, land fertility, and happiness.

The festival held in Pernik is the oldest festival of the masquerade games in Bulgaria. The first edition was opened on 16 January 1966. In 1995 the International Federation of Carnival Cities accepted the town of Pernik as its full member. In 2009 Pernik was proclaimed as the European capital of Surva's and Mummer's.

The news that the Kukeri tradition and the Surva Festival in Pernik will be included in UNESCO's list of protected non-material cultural heritage, was announced before the inaugural ceremony of the 20th edition of the mummery fest.

In January 2024, Pernik was declared a Global Center of Masquerade Traditions by the Federation of European Carnival Cities.

June
“Chicho Stoyan”
Regional children's folklore festival.

International Student Festival “Green Light”

19 October
Saint John of Rila – day of the city

== Folklore ==
Characteristic of the region is the folkloric dance – "Graovsko horo" and folk clothes – female costumes "Litatsi" /Women are bordered with black litatsi paieti white shirts with belts/. Over the last decade Pernik has become famous in Bulgaria. Mass culture and the popular media often interpret events and people of the city. There are many jokes, movies, literature, TV shows and songs in which the main subject is a citizen of Pernik. According to them, a typical man from Pernik is always ready to get into a fight, speeds with his car, and talks with a specific dialect. His distinguishing features are a miner's hat with a flashlight, T-shirts of the local football team “Minyor” and miner bracket in the hand.

== Economy and commerce ==
=== Manufacturing ===
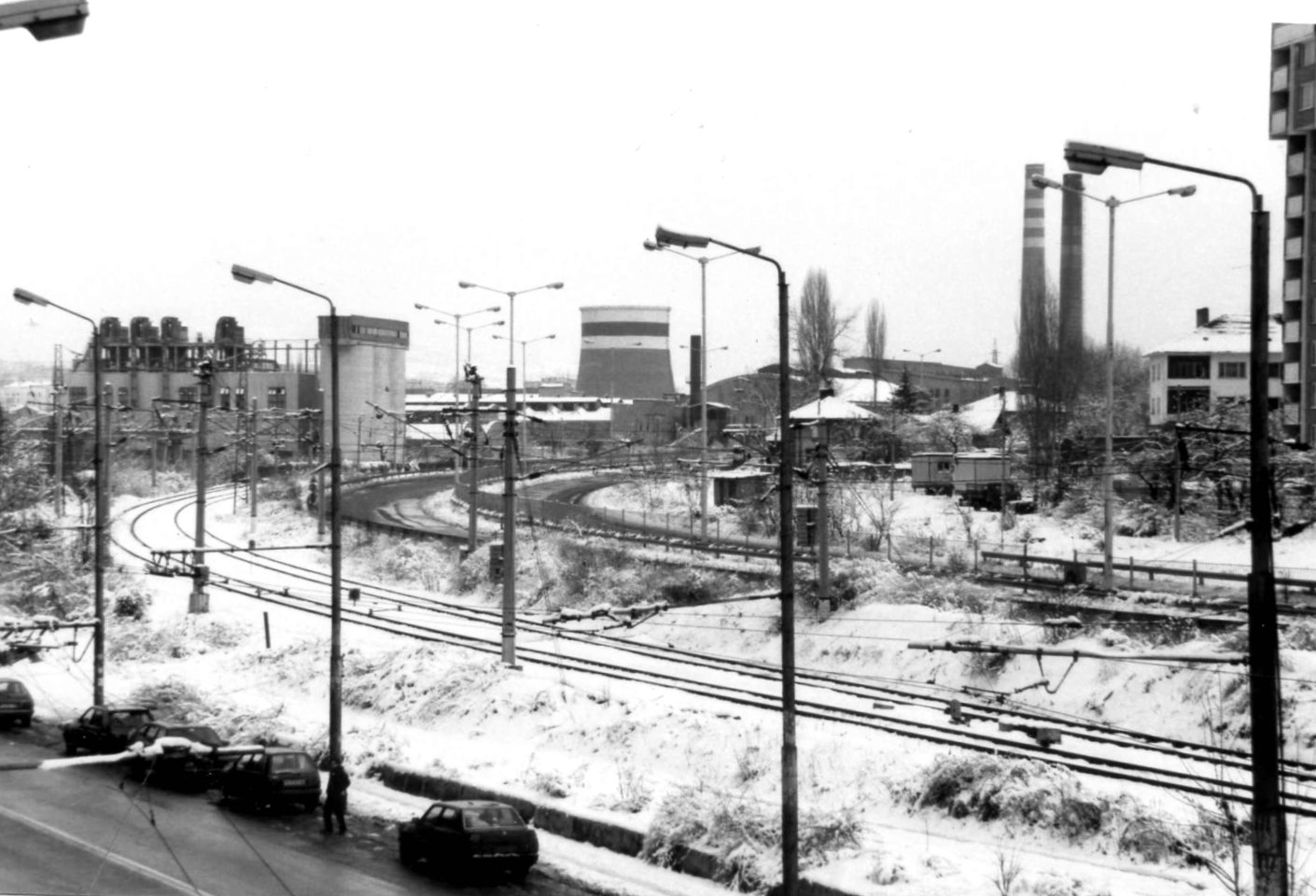
Industrial railway landscape

Manufacturing companies:

- Stomana Industry – Large enterprise for the production and marketing of steel and steel profiles
- Opencast coal mines – Pernik /Otkrit Vagledobiv Mines EAD/- production and trade with brown coal
- Heat - electrical central /TEC - Republika/ – Pernik – generation of electricity and steam
- Air Liquid Pernik – part of World leader in gases, technologies and services for Industry and Health
- Lemi Trafo – produce three phase oil-immersed transformers
- Sami M- specialised meat processor for semi-ready products from red and white meats
- Prim – production of meat products
- Bluepoint – factory for Swim and Beachware.
- Central enrichment factory – Pernik /Centralna Obogatitelna Fabrika/ – enrichment brown coals
- ZGMM Corporation – manufacture for metal cutting machines
- Colhida Metal – manufacture of other fabricated metal products
- Ading Pernik – part of Ading – ADING is a leading company in South East Europe in production and sale of construction chemicals
- Silcotech Bulgaria Ltd – Pernik – benefits from Swiss management and is part of the multinational Silcotech Group – specialized in two-component liquid silicon and engineering (technical) plastics molding.
- Puratos Pernik, Belgium company – Food, Food products, Bread, Bacery products.
- "Welding Machines" – is the successor of the former factory welding machines "Krakra" based Pernik. The production program of the company covers more than 25 welding products – welding transformers, welding rectifiers, Argon- arc welding, Burners and burners mini kit, Oxygen cutting torches and Set burners and oxygen cutting torch.

Several companies declared bankruptcy after failure Privatization are: glass factories – "Crystal", for building panels DF "Concrete" /Beton/, for steel profiles "Blagoj Popov" /"Kamet"/ SA, for the production of pectin – "Pectin" AD, first Bulgarian machine-building plant "Struma", the older thermal power plant "TPP – Pernik." and other companies. Because of this, the city has a lot of empty factory buildings and infrastructure areas.

=== Commerce ===
Some of the biggest stores in the town:

- City department store (GUM) Pernik
- Billa - 2 stores
- Kaufland - 2 stores
- CBA - 3 stores
- T Market - 2 stores
- Lidl – 3 stores
- dm – 2 stores
- Technocommerce 3 stores
- Technopolis – 1 store
- Technomarket – 1 store
- Yavor – big furniture store
- Fantastico – 1 store
- a shopping mall is being built to host famous and international brands.

=== Pernik in literature ===
The collapse of the roof of the newly built “Lenin” metallurgy plant hours before the plant's ribbon cutting ceremony on November 5, 1953 lies behind the storyline of the novel “The Roof” by Bulgarian dissident journalist and writer Georgi Markov. This major industrial incident, one of many during Bulgaria's communist rule between 1944 and 1989, was a result of the deficiencies of the communist economic doctrine of forced industrialization where the regime cut corners during the construction and exploitation of major industrial assets, leading to the death and injuries of thousands of ordinary workers. In the book, Markov, who was murdered in London by the Bulgarian communist security services in 1978, uses the roof as a metaphor to describe the degradation of the Bulgarian communist system.

== Sport ==
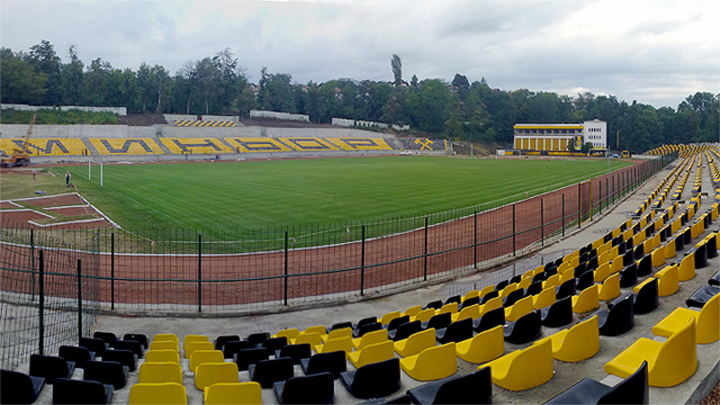
Stadium of Peace

The town is home to the Minyor Pernik football team, who play in the Bulgarian A Professional Football Group, as of the 2008–09 season. A longtime participant in the group. Also football club Metalurg, volleyball, basketball, wrestling, weightlifting, boxing and other sports clubs. Five kilometers west of the town of Pernik in the village Rudartsi has mineral water and swimming pool. Sports facilities are the following:

- Stadium "Stadium of Peace" (formerly "Miner") – capacity 8000 seats
- Stadium "Metallurg"
- Rugby stadium "Rollers"
- Sports hall "Boris Gyuderov" (formerly "Miner") – a capacity of 2000 seats
- Sports hall "Metallurg"
- Sports hall "Krakra"
- Sports hall "Druzhba"
- Horse Racecourse
- Complex Sport Park – indoor hall mini football
- Ice Rink Ice Park
- AST Sports Complex – Tennis courts
- several fitness centers
- mineral swimming pools in the village of Rudartsi – 4 km (2 mi) east of the city
- city beach with an outdoor swimming pool in the central city park.
- Motocross runway – 2 km north of the city

== Historical events and facts ==
- 7th to 11th centuries – Pernik is economic, military and cultural center in the southwestern Bulgarian lands. Pernik town joined the First Bulgarian Empire in 816. The fame of city is associated mostly with boyar Krakra Pernik, who had determined resistance of the Byzantines in the beginning of the 11th century.
- 10th century – Saint John of Rila "...went to Pernik and settle down in stony place near the river called Struma".
- In the end of the 12th century the fortress of Krakra was destroyed, but the village still exists.
- 19th to 20th centuries – from agricultural region Pernik town became an important center of mining, metallurgy and engineering.
- 1891 – Opening of the first "State Mine- Pernik".
- 1893 – Opening of the railway line Sofia-Pernik gives new opportunities to the village of Pernik. The railway station was built in 1927.
- 1895 – First bulb in Bulgaria lights up in Pernik.
- 1899 – The first power plant in Bulgaria is built in Pernik.
- 1903 – Announcement of St. Ivan Rilski the patron saint of miners and town of Pernik.
- 1906 – The First mass strike in Bulgaria. Strikers rising require an 8-hour workday, the right of association of miners in the syndicate and regular payment of wages. The strike ends with victory for the workers – their wages are increased.
- 1919 – Second Strike of Pernik mine workers. 7000 miners suspended from work. In the very next day management of the "Mine Pernik" sign a protocol, which obliged them to pay wages for the last two months and to pay regular wages of the workers in the future.
- 1932 The building of the Mining Department is completed.
- 1944 – Third Strike of Pernik workers. In front of building of Mining Department thousands of workers organized a rally that quickly turns into anti-government demonstration. In clashes with police 6 workers were killed, with 13 injured. The Government fell on 9 September 1944.
- 1934-1953 – In the Area of Pernik many factories are built.(People from all over the country are coming to town, looking for job and better future)
- 1953 – Opening of dam "Studena".
- 1953 – Completed the Post Office in the center of Pernik.
- 1957 – Opening of the City Palace complex of culture.
- 1966– The first officially conducting of the International Festival “Surva”.
- 1968 – Construction of a city department store, GUM.
- 1972 – Completed Hotel "Struma".
- 1978 – Completed the building of the Municipality.
- 1982 – Created today's center area of Pernik.
- 2010 – European Polytechnical University is open for the first time in Pernik.
- 2012 – On 22 May the 5.6 Mw Pernik earthquake shook the provincial center with a maximum Mercalli intensity of VI (Strong), causing one indirect fatality.

== Municipality ==
Pernik is the seat of the eponymous Pernik municipality (part of Pernik Province), which includes the following 24 places (towns in bold):

- **Batanovtsi**
- Bogdanovdol
- Bosnek
- Cherna Gora
- Chuypetlovo
- Divotino
- Dragichevo
- Golemo Buchino
- Kladnitsa
- Kralev Dol
- Leskovets
- Lyulin
- Meshtitsa
- **Pernik**
- Planinitsa
- Radui
- Rasnik
- Rudartsi
- Selishten Dol
- Studena
- Viskear
- Vitanovtsi
- Yardzhilovtsi
- Zidartsi

== International relations ==
=== Twin towns – sister cities ===
Pernik is twinned with:

- Balashikha, Russia
- Elektrostal, Russia
- Huai'an, China
- Jagodina, Serbia
- Kavadarci, North Macedonia
- Lublin, Poland
- Luhansk, Ukraine
- Nilüfer, Turkey
- Orosei, Italy
- Orsha, Belarus
- Ovar, Portugal
- Pantelej (Niš), Serbia
- Pardubice, Czech Republic
- Pusztaszer, Hungary
- Rožaje, Montenegro

== Honour ==
Pernik Peninsula in Graham Land, Antarctica is named after the city of Pernik.

== Gallery ==
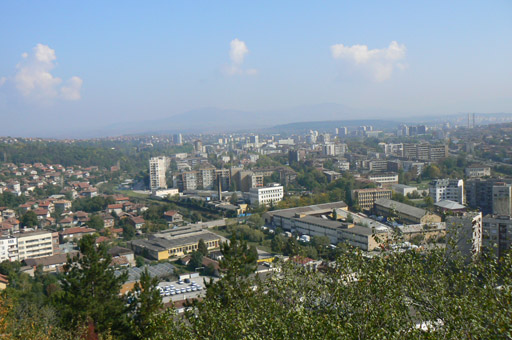
Overview of the city

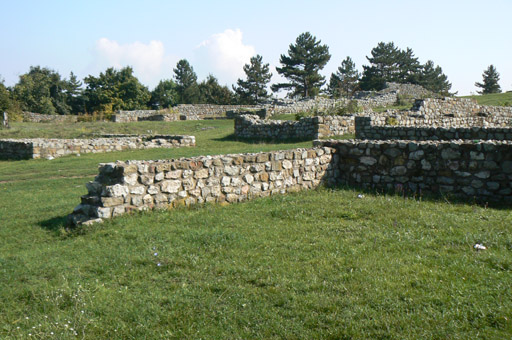
Ruins of the medieval fortress of Krakra near Pernik

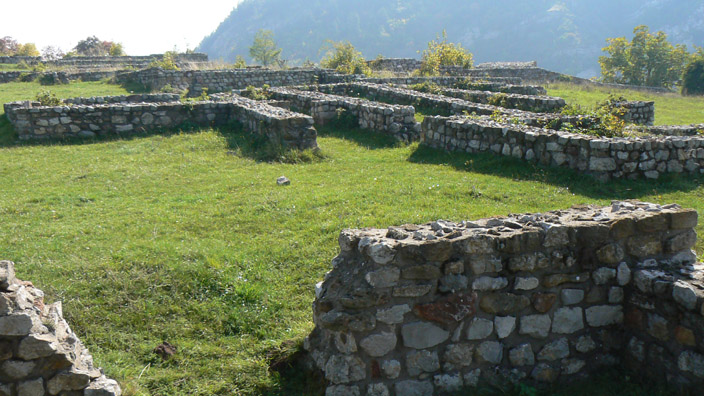
Ruins of the medieval fortress of Krakra near Pernik

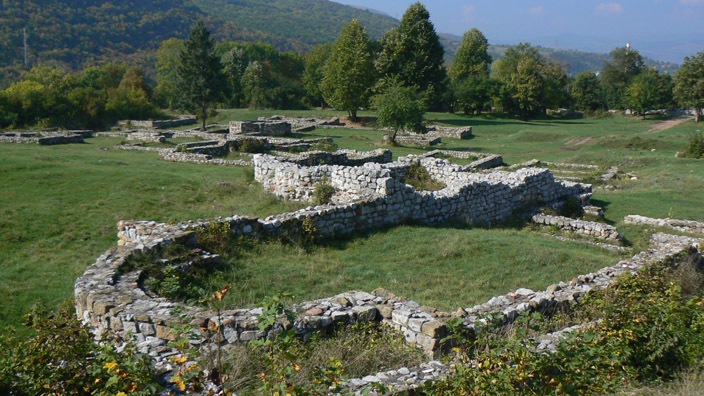
Ruins of the medieval fortress of Krakra near Pernik

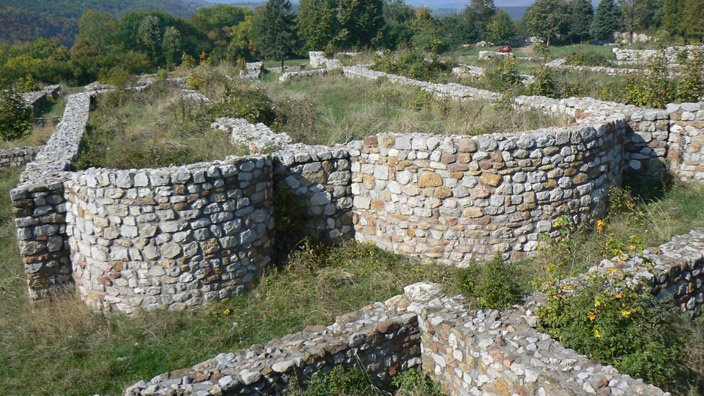
Ruins of the medieval fortress of Krakra near Pernik

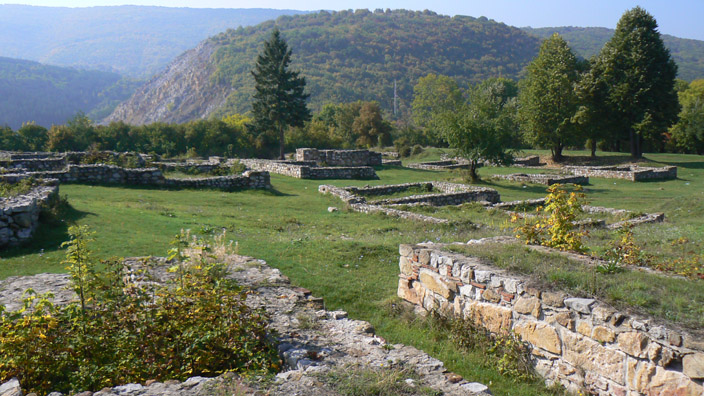
Ruins of the medieval fortress of Krakra near Pernik

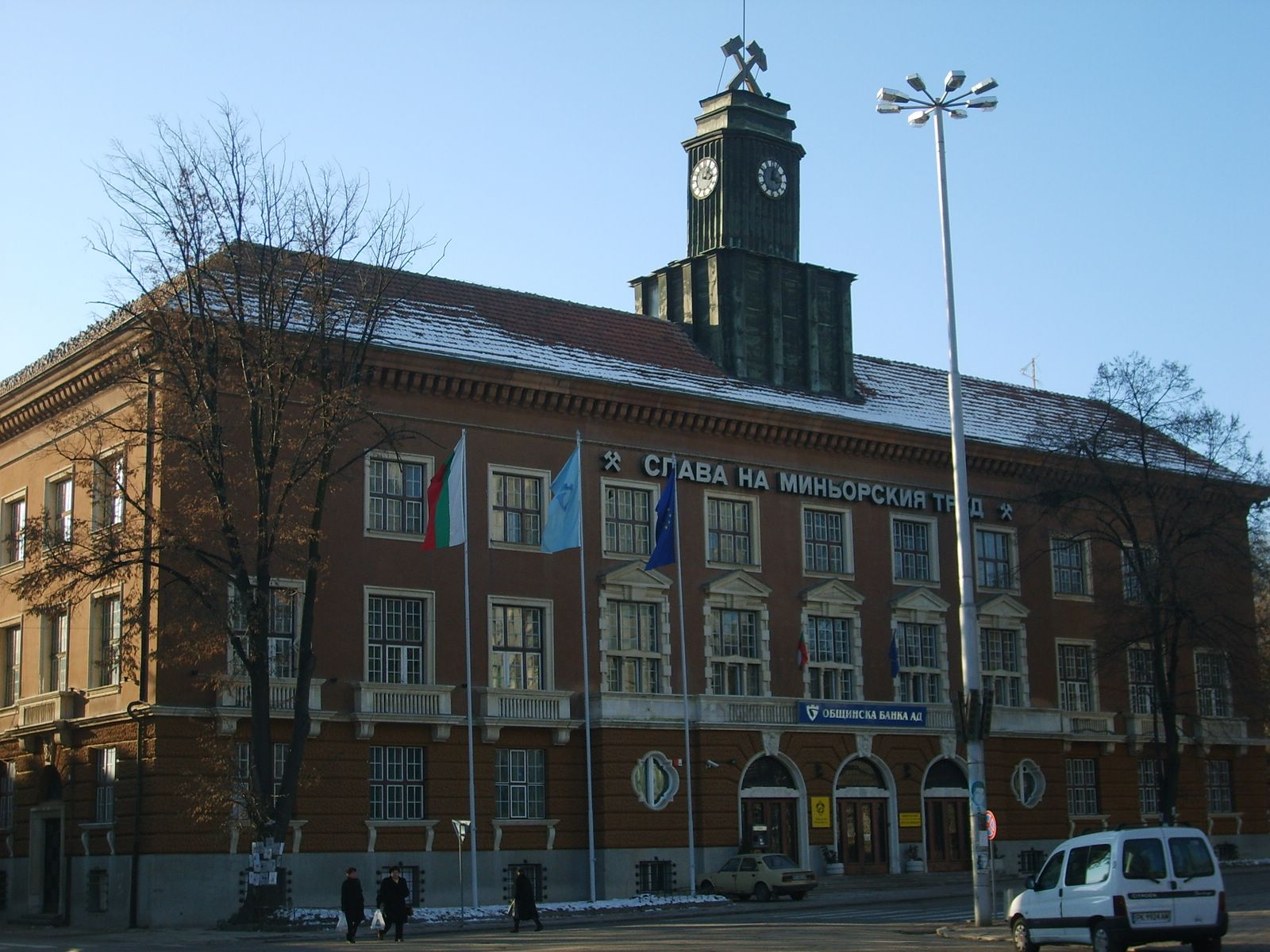
Mining Administration building (built 1929–1932)

Direction of Mine-Pernik

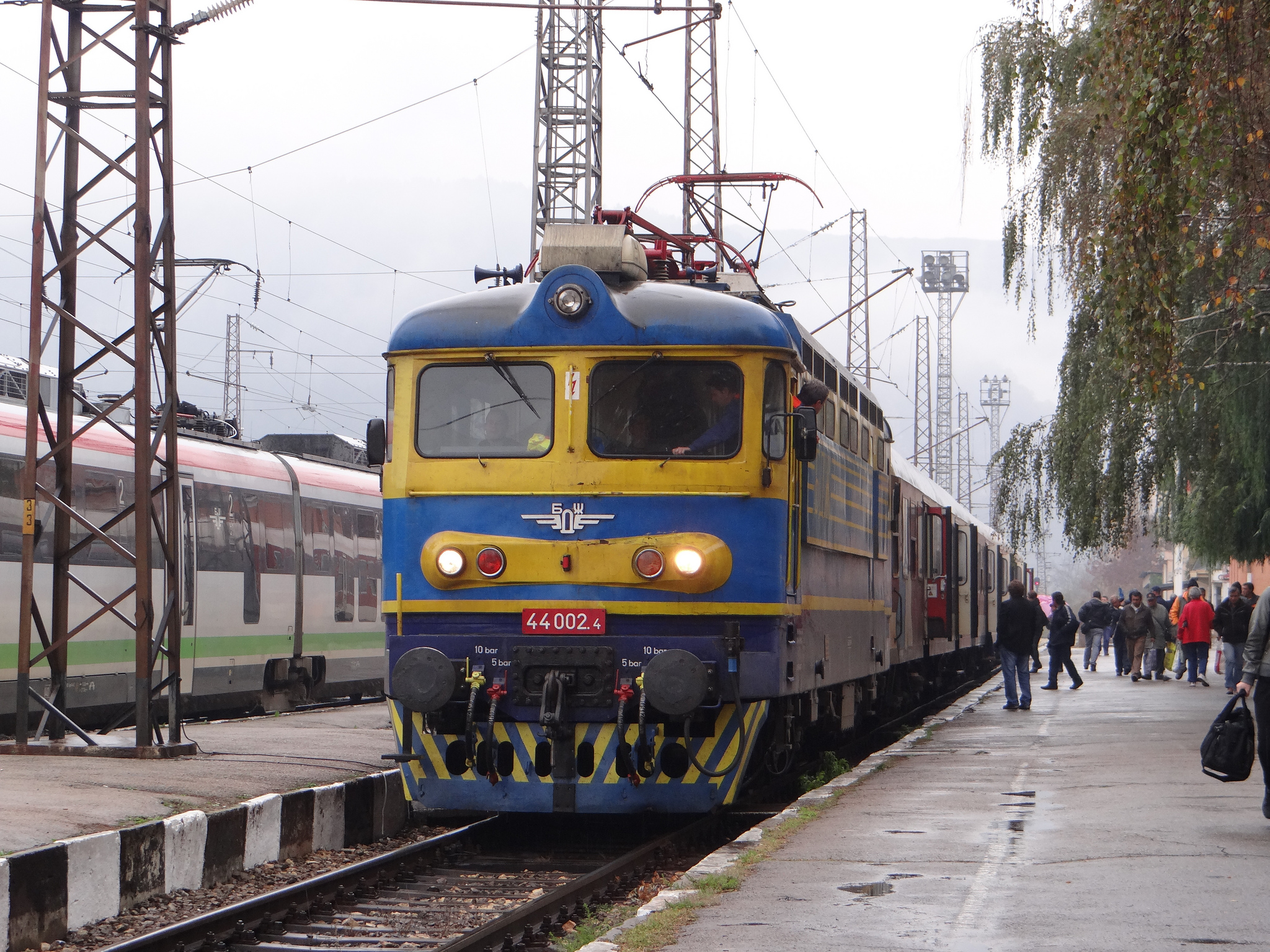
BDZ trains at Pernik railway station

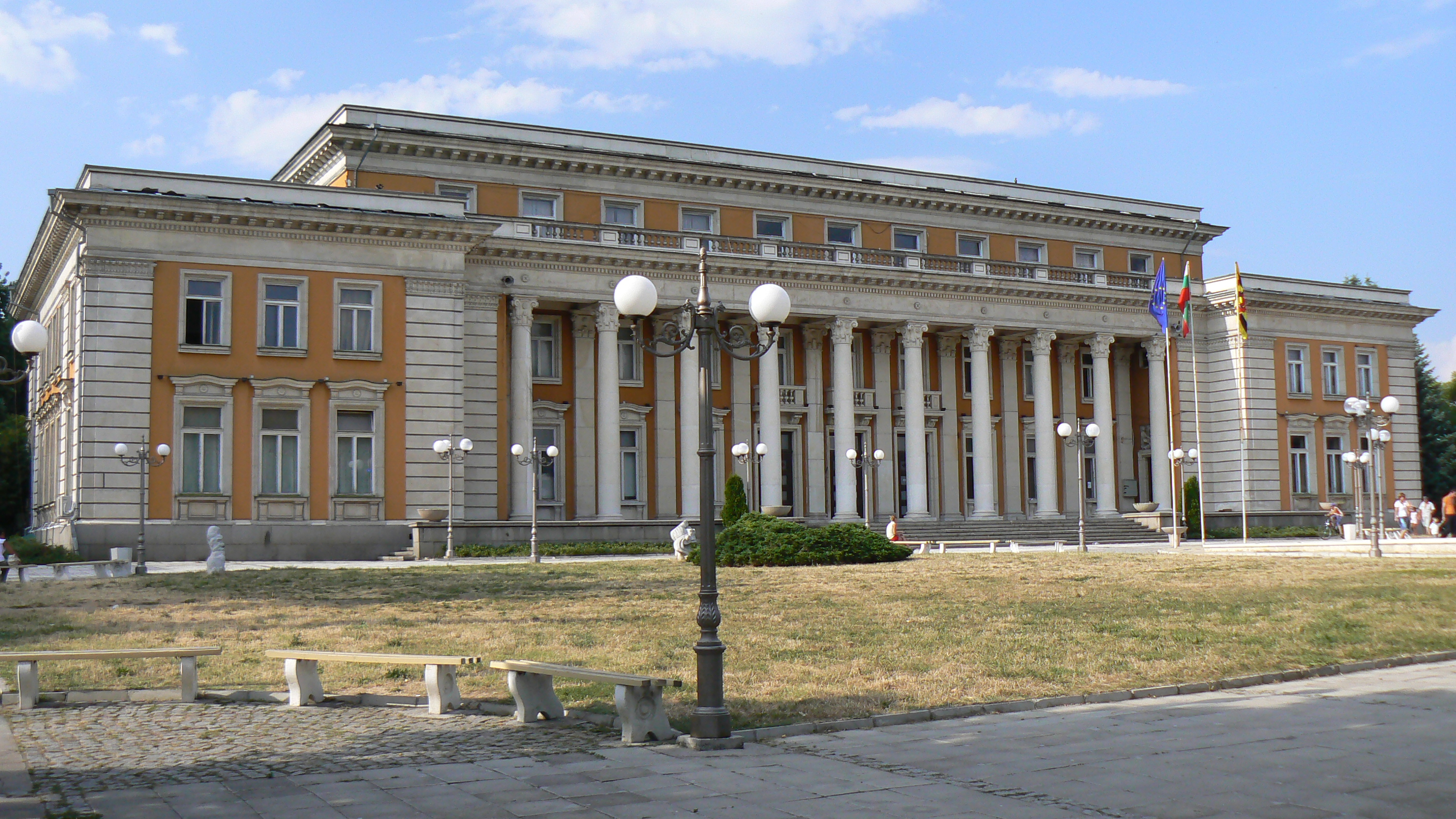
**Palace of Culture** (built 1953–1957)

Palace of Culture by Night

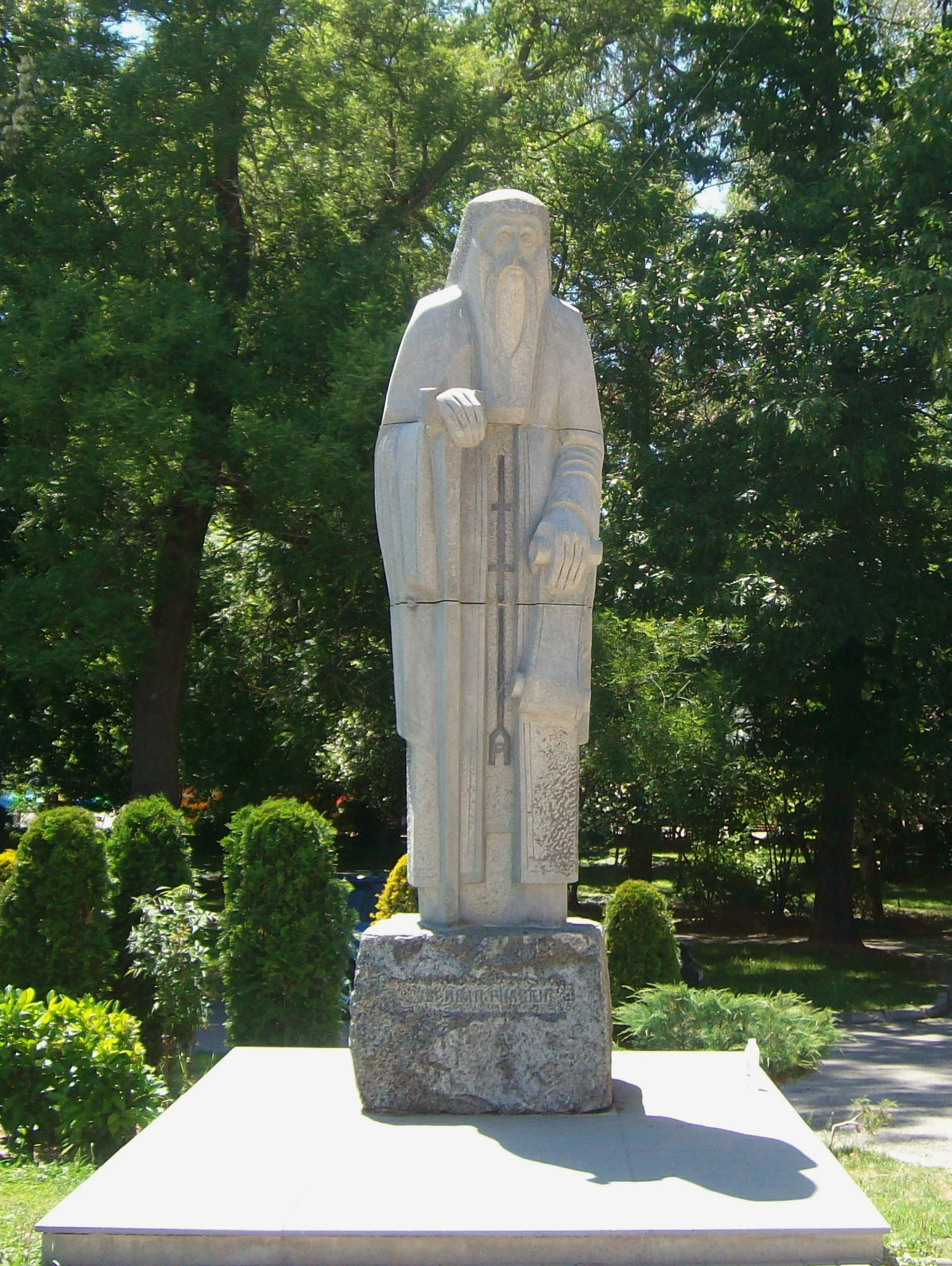
Saint Ivan Rilski in Pernik

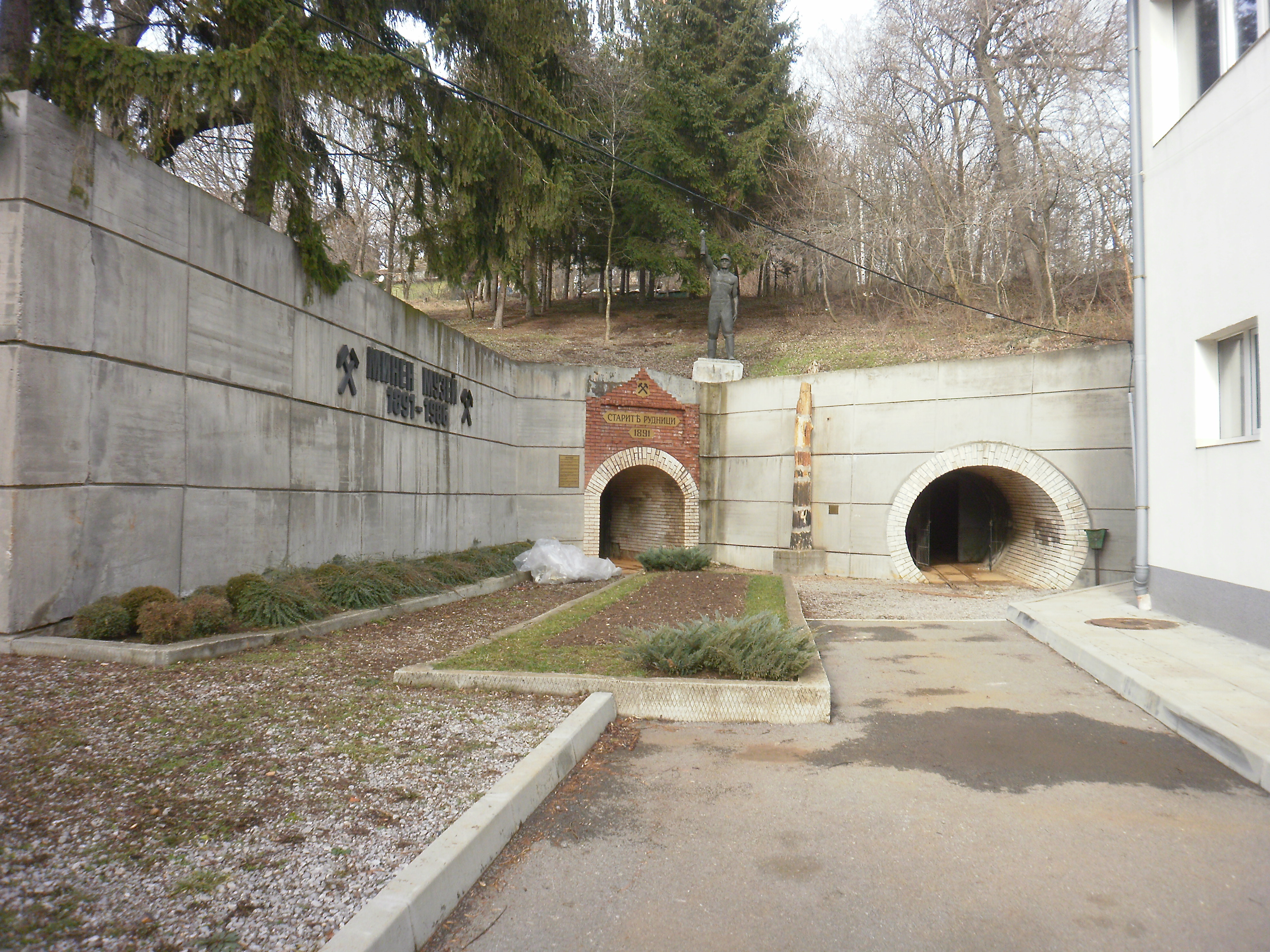
Mining museums of Pernik

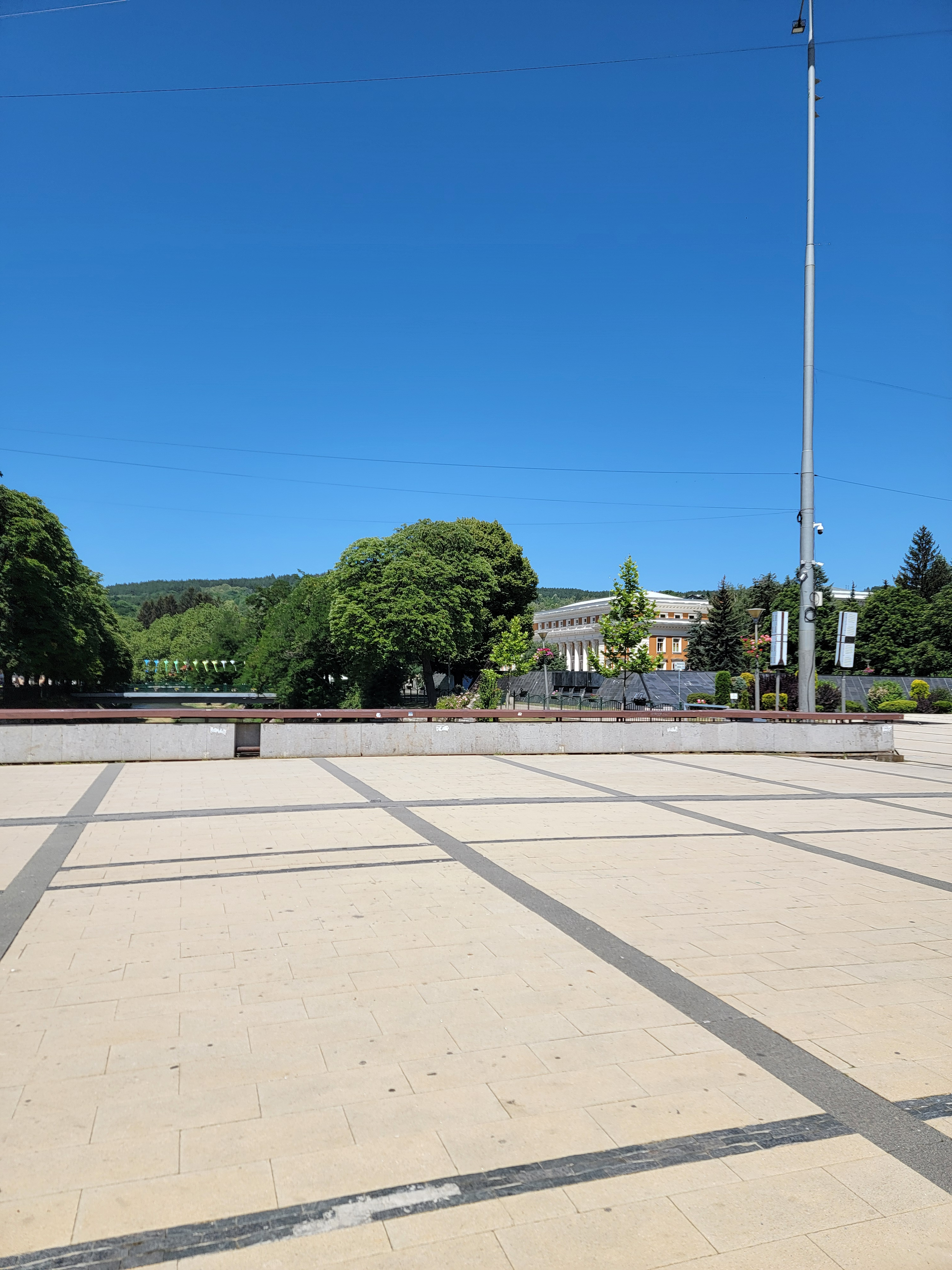
Pernik Central Square

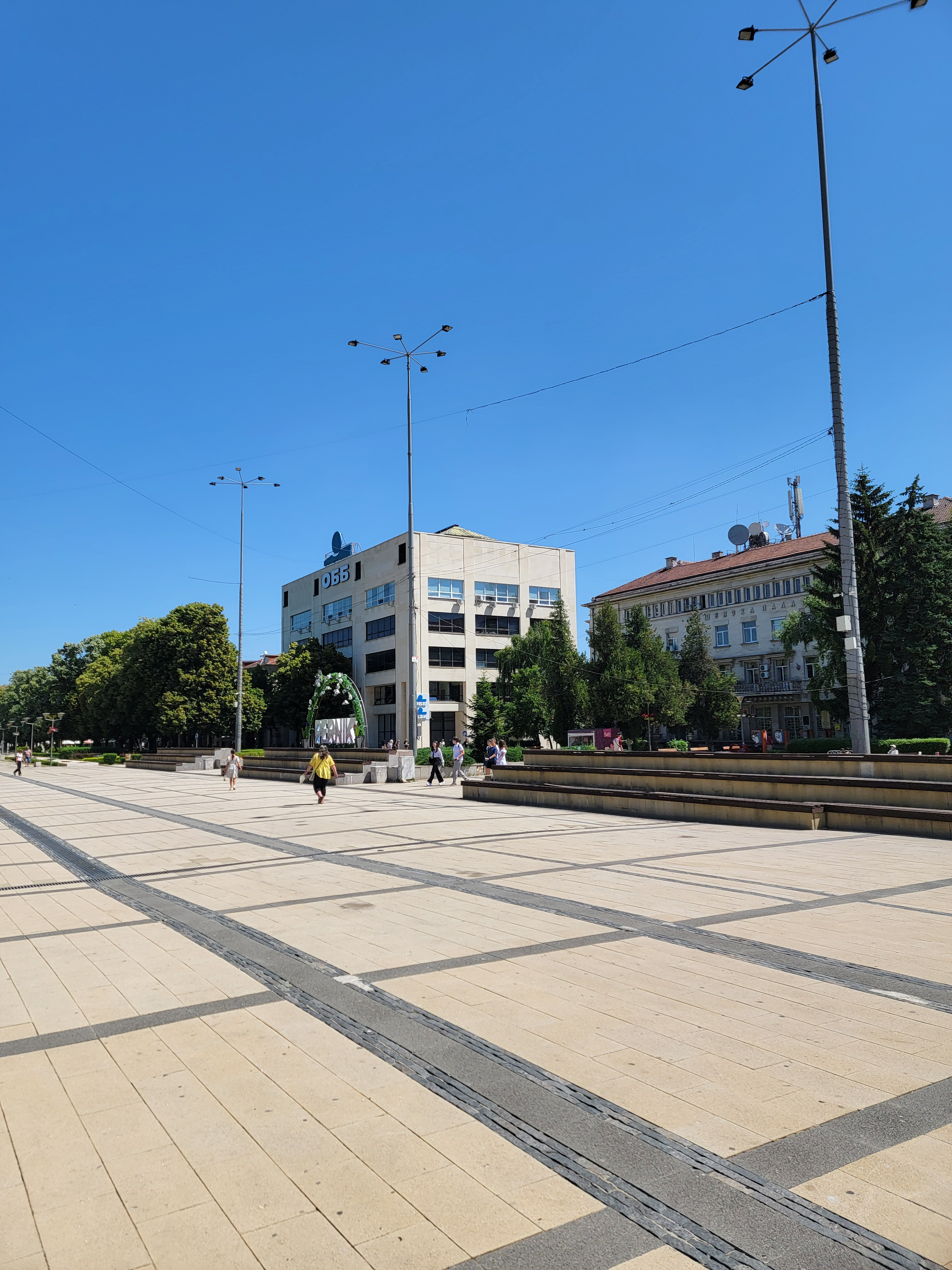
Pernik Central Square
