= Fantasticos =

Dutch schlager duo

Fantasticos is a Dutch schlager duo made up of Johnny Meijers and Henk Janssen. The two developed a long friendship that culminated in forming Fantasticos in 2012. The duo have released two studio albums and had a number of charting singles.

== Members ==
=== Johnny Meijers ===
Johnny Meijers, born 1949 in Egelantierstraat in de Amsterdamse Jordaan and moved to Nijmegen. He learned drums and accordion from his father, a musician and toured with him. He joined The Red Berries as a drummer and at 20 joined Groesbeekse-based band The Sunstreams also as drummer. The Sunstreams found success in the 1980s and are well known for "Aan de grens van de Duitse heuvelen" and "Hoor je het ruizen der golven". The band had two albums certified gold and platinum. In the late 1980s, he opened a bar in Nijmeegse with his wife Jeannette, a trendy bar called De Sport Centrale.

=== Henk Janssen ===
Henk Janssen, born 1965 in Groesbeek starting early performing in fairs and cafes and pubs in Groesbeek area. he met Johnny Meijers while attending a gig by Johnny's band The Sunstreams. Henk played in various formations like Les Chromona’s, The Moonlights and De Havenzangers, but had his solo singles "Maar eens zijn wij samen" and "En heel vaak huil je". He moved to Nijmegen in 1985 where he married José.

== Discographies ==
=== Albums ===
Year	Album	Peak positions	
Year	Album	NED	BEL (Vl)
2012	Fantasticos	16	174
2014	Het leven is zo mooi	3	–

=== Singles ===
Year	Single	Peak positions	Album
Year	Single	NED Single Top 100	Album
2012	"Weet je wat jij voor mij bent"	21	
2012	"Zonder jou ben ik verloren"	20	
2012	"Mijn allermooiste kerst kado"	22	
2013	"Mooi is het om op de wereld te zijn"	22	
2013	"Verb♥den liefde"	30	
2014	"Een nacht met jou"	36	
2014	"Ti amo I love You"	36	
