= Kam Market (supermarket) =

KAM Market
- Company type: Private
- Industry: Retail
- Genre: Hard-discount
- Founded: 1999
- Founder: Goce Kamcev
- Headquarters: Skopje, North Macedonia
- Number of locations: 112 (2025)
- Area served: North Macedonia 85 Bulgaria 26
- Key people: Trajce Cvetanoski (Director) Tanja Kamceva (Owner)
- Products: Groceries, household goods, private-label products
- Revenue: 301,570,135€ (Domestic Revenue)
- Number of employees: 1700+
- Website: kam.com.mk

Kam Market (Macedonian: Кам Маркет) registered as "Kam Doo" is a Macedonian hard-discount chain with headquarters in Skopje. KAM is known for its private-label product lines, cost-efficient store layout, and focus on everyday affordability. As of 2025, the chain operates more than 100 stores across the country and abroad, making it one of the largest food retailers in the Macedonian market. Currently it is the highest gross-revenue grocery chain in North Macedonia. The company's name is based on the first three letters of the founder's, Goce Kamcev's, surname.

== History and International Expansion ==
KAM Market began in 1995 with a single store in the City Trade Center in Skopje, under the founding company KAMFUD. Over the following decades, the chain expanded across the Republic of Macedonia, focusing on a hard-discount business model with private-label products and cost-efficient store layouts. The company focuses on affordability and everyday low prices, making it one of the most recognized discount chains in the country.

The company started expansion in foreign markets in 2017 with Bulgaria and Kosovo being the primary markets. As of November 2025 Kam Market operates 86 stores in North Macedonia with 1428 employees and 26 in Bulgaria with 286 employees. Until early 2025 Kam Market operated in Kosovo with 29 stores before selling them to Diambe Market while Kam Market retained name franchising and distribution rights.
