= Mr. Bricolage =

French multinational home improvement retail chain

Mr.Bricolage
- Company type: Public
- Traded as: Euronext: ALMRB; Euronext Growth
- Industry: Retail
- Founded: 1964
- Headquarters: La Chapelle-Saint-Mesmin, France
- Products: Home improvement tools, garden supplies & plants.
- Revenue: 1.97 billion Euro (2019)
- Website: www.mr-bricolage.com

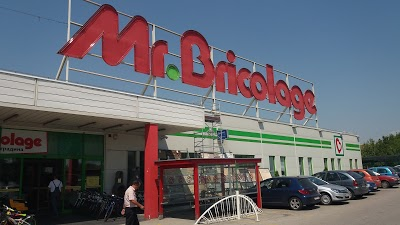
Mr.Bricolage in Skopje, North Macedonia

Mr.Bricolage is a French retail chain offering home improvement and do-it-yourself goods. The company has around 400 stores across France and 70 stores abroad. Mr.Bricolage is listed on the Euronext Paris since 2000.

== History ==
The company was founded in the early 1964 as the Action Nationale des Promoteurs du Faites-le-vous-même (ANPF), the direct French translation of 'do-it-yourself' by the Tabur family who were keen to promote the fast-growing new hobby of DIY.

Originally, each store had its own name. In 1980, all the stores were united under a single brand: Mr.Bricolage.

The ANPF was a cooperative organization that, as a holding company, converted its status in 1995 to that of a limited liability company in order to be able to raise outside capital.

In March 2015, a protracted buy-out of Mr.Bricolage by the home improvement retailer Kingfisher plc for an estimated fee of €275 million ran into difficulties when Mr.Bricolage's board and its biggest shareholder – ANPF - voiced reservations over the proposed deal.

== Operations ==
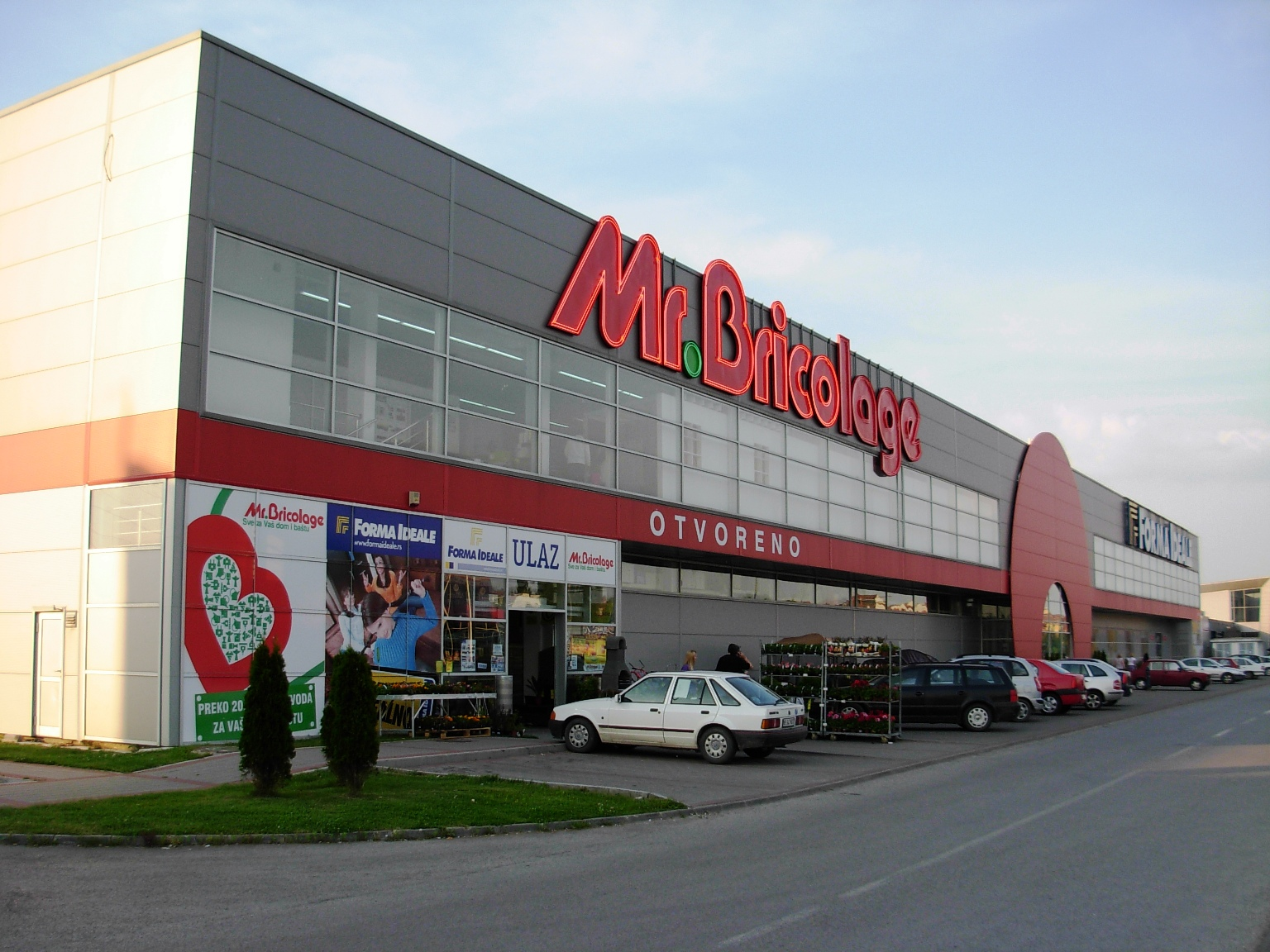
A Mr.Bricolage store in Novi Sad, Serbia

The Mr.Bricolage Group has 285 stores under the Mr.Bricolage brand and 104 under the Briconautes brand in European France and 13 stores in French overseas departments and territories. The group also have affiliate stores.

There are 70 franchise stores abroad, of which 45 stores in Belgium, 13 stores in Bulgaria, 7 stores in Morocco, 1 store in Andorra, 1 store in Cyprus, 1 store in French Polynesia, 1 store in Madagascar, 1 store in Mauritius 1 store in the Ivory Coast and just recently opened a store in Pristina, capital of Kosovo.

Mr.Bricolage used to have franchise stores in Spain, Portugal, Romania, Argentina, Uruguay, Colombia, Serbia, Turkey and Azerbaijan.

In June 2023, Mr.Bricolage acquired more than 1,000 stores and affiliates worldwide.
