= Fantastico (supermarket chain) =

Bulgarian supermarket chain

Fantastico Group
- Company type: Private
- Industry: Retail
- Founded: 1991
- Founder: Valeri Nikolov
- Headquarters: Sofia, Bulgaria
- Number of locations: 47 supermarkets (2024)
- Key people: Vladimir Nikolov (Owner)
- Revenue: 873,696,000 Bulgarian lev (2023)
- Net income: 51,297,000 Bulgarian lev (2023)
- Total assets: 482,146,000 Bulgarian lev (2023)
- Owner: Private company
- Number of employees: ~3,500 (2025)
- Website: www.fantastico.bg

First logo of Fantastico in 1991

Fantastico (Фантастико) is a Bulgarian supermarket chain founded in 1991 by Valeri Nikolov. Fantastico is part of the retail sector and primarily sells foodstuffs. The first supermarket was opened at 72 Oborischte street. Since then, the company began expanding mostly in the capital of Bulgaria.

As of 2025, the company operates 43 stores in Sofia and 4 outside Sofia, including a do-it-yourself store and eight cash and carry hypermarkets. Although most Fantastico stores are in the capital, the chain is the main competitor of international chains like Billa in the country. In 2007, Fantastico opened its first supermarket outside the capital, in the town of Kyustendil, in south-western Bulgaria. Nowadays, there are Fantastico supermarkets in Sofia, Kyustendil, Pernik, Botevgrad and Elin Pelin. The chain currently reports that it employs more than 3,500 people.

On 6 December 2025, Valeri Nikolov died at the age of 74, leaving his son, Vladimir Nikolov, as the sole proprietor of Fatastico Group.
