= Technomarket =

Bulgarian consumer electronics chain

Current Logo

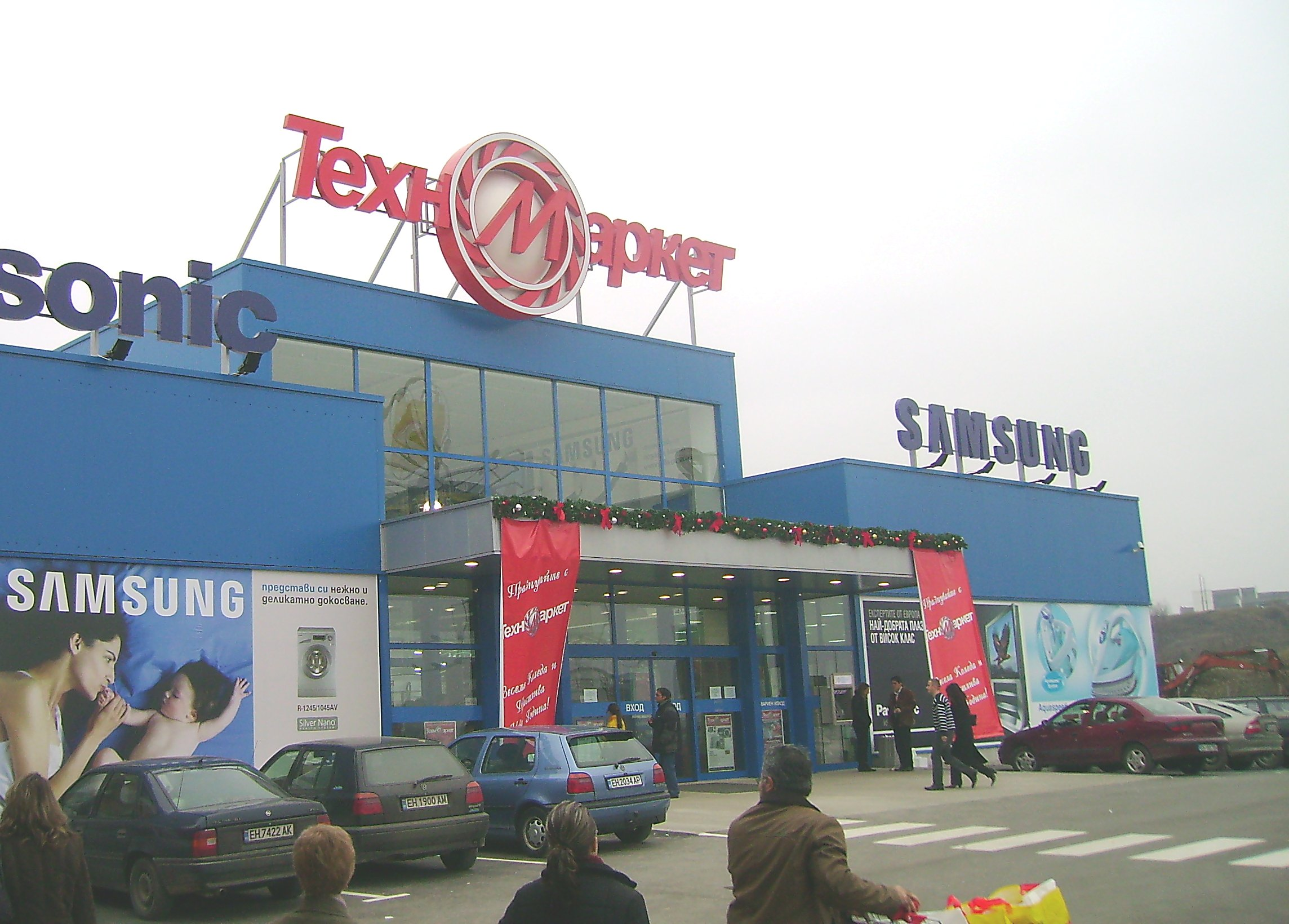
A Technomarket store in Pleven, Bulgaria

Technomarket (Bulgarian: Техномаркет) is a Bulgarian retailer of consumer electronics that operates stores in Bulgaria, Kosovo, North Macedonia, Bosnia and Herzegovina, Slovakia and Montenegro. It also used to operate in Croatia, Romania and Serbia, but failed.

Technomarket is the brand name of K&K Electronics, a Bulgarian company founded in 1992. K&K Electronics is owned by the London Stock Exchange-listed British Virgin Islands-based company Equest Investments Balkans Limited. The first Technomarket store opened in 1999. In 2007, K&K Electronics acquired the Romanian chain DOMO, which by the time had entered the Bulgarian market, and established the TechnomarketDomo Group. DOMO operates as a separate brand name in Romania and Bulgaria; in Bulgaria, that chain typically has smaller and more centrally located stores than Technomarket.

As of late 2009, Technomarket operates 44 stores in Bulgaria, nine in North Macedonia, 14 in Bosnia and Herzegovina, two in Slovakia, seven in Kosovo, and 13 in Montenegro. In Romania, K&K Electronics has 126 stores, all operating under the DOMO brand.

== Stores ==
These were the stores of Technomarket as of February 2018:

Country	Stores
Bulgaria	45
Bosnia and Herzegovina	14
Montenegro	13
North Macedonia	21
Kosovo	7
