= Crimean Bulgarians =

Ethnic Bulgarian minority in Crimea

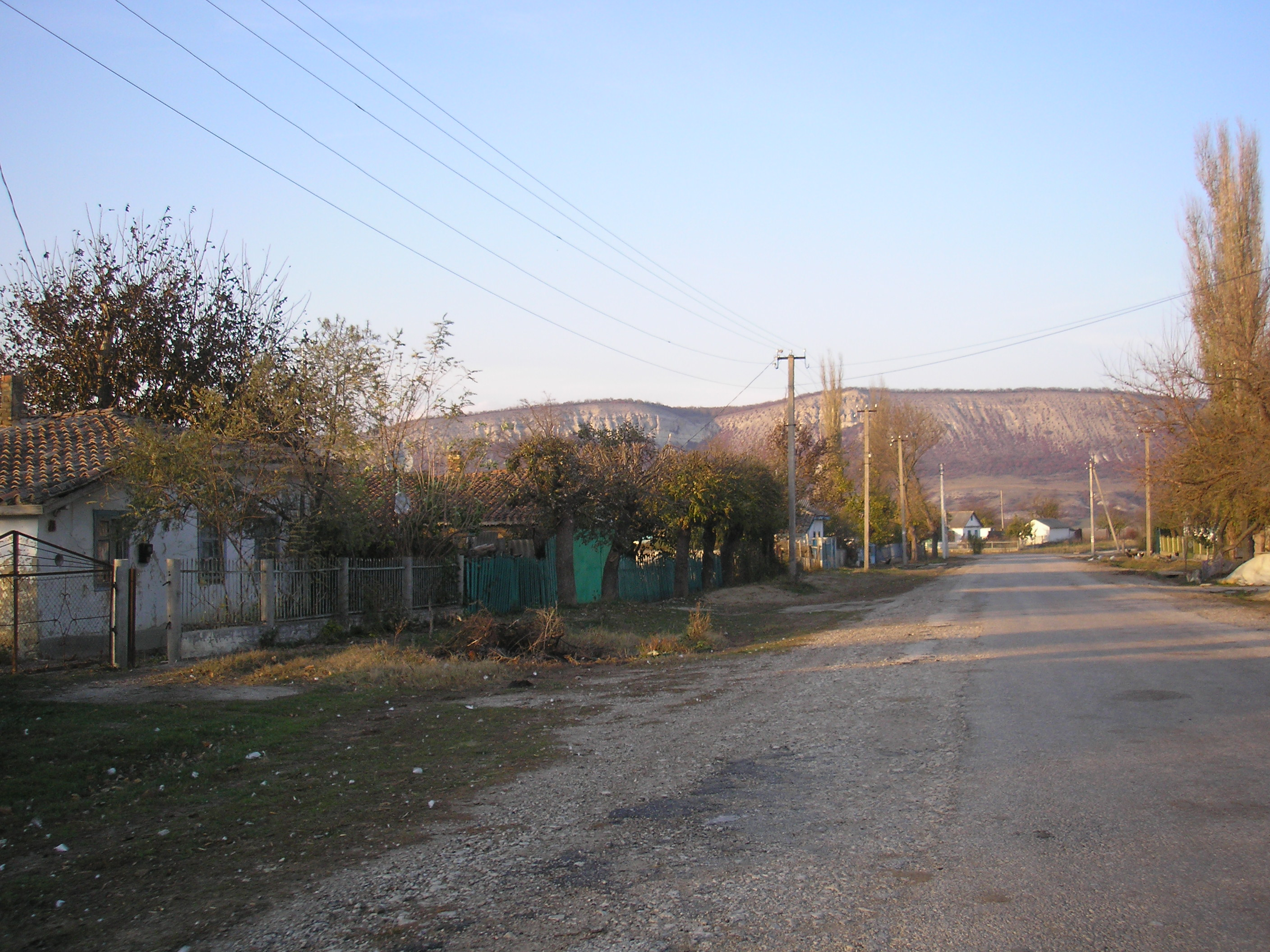
The village of Kishlav (today Kurske, Bilohirsk Raion) was one of the hubs of the Crimean Bulgarian community

The Crimean Bulgarians (Bulgarian: кримски българи, krimski balgari) are a historical ethnic Bulgarian minority in Crimea, a peninsula in Ukraine on the northern coast of the Black Sea. As of 2014, there are officially 1,868 Bulgarians in Crimea, although the leader of the Bulgarian community estimates up to 2,500 families, including mixed marriages. Crimean Bulgarians are a small subgroup of the much larger Bulgarian minority in Ukraine.

== History ==
Map of the most significant Crimean Bulgarian localities

In the 7th century, the steppes north of Crimea were part of Old Great Bulgaria, a nomadic empire of the Onogur Bulgars. In the 10th century, the so-called Black Bulgars would regularly raid Byzantine possessions in Crimea (the Theme of Cherson) from the north.

However, the modern Bulgarian population in Crimea dates to several waves of migration from Ottoman-ruled Bulgaria beginning in the early 19th century. In 1802, 63 Bulgarian families founded a Bulgarian colony in Staryi Krym. In August 1804, 220 Bulgarians from the Adrianople vilayet landed at Sevastopol and established the village of Kishlav (today Kurske, Bilohirsk Raion). These first settlers stemmed from the Strandzha localities of Gramatikovo, Kondolovo, Stoilovo and Malko Tarnovo. In Kishlav and Bolgarshchina, the Bulgarian neighbourhood of Staryi Krym, historic Bulgarian houses and churches can still be found.

A second wave of migration followed after the Russo-Turkish War of 1828–1829 with around 1,000 colonists from the Varna, Burgas, Sozopol, Pomorie, Tsarevo and Sliven regions. After the Crimean War of 1853–1856, a third wave brought settlers from the Vidin area, as well as resettling Bessarabian Bulgarians. In the 1860s, Bulgarians also repopulated the seaside village of Koktebel and by 1920, they were present in 16 towns and villages across the peninsula.

The Russian famine of 1921–1922 led to the death of many Crimean Bulgarians. In 1944, the Crimean Bulgarians were gravely affected by the Soviet deportation of the Crimean Tatars and other ethnic groups of the peninsula (Armenians, Greeks and Germans). 12,500 Bulgarians were branded as traitors by the Soviets and deported from Crimea.

== Population ==
Year	Number
1821	ca. 2,712
1865	ca. 3,200
1897	7,450 or 7,528
1926	11,377
1939	15,344
1989	2,186
2014	1,868
