= Digital terrestrial television in Bulgaria =

Digital terrestrial television in Bulgaria began in November 2004 in Sofia, Bulgaria with the launch of a free-to-air platform. Ever since then the Digital terrestrial tv network has grown to have networks all over Bulgaria.

== History ==
Bulgaria launched a free-to-air platform on Sofia region, starting in November 2004. The Communications Regulatory Commission (CRC) has said that it received 6 bids for the licence to build and operate Bulgaria's two nationwide DTT networks. A second licence tender for the operation of 3 DTT multiplexes was open until 27 May 2009. Following the closing of this process, Hannu Pro, part of Silicon Group, and with Baltic Operations has secured the license to operate three DTT multiplexes in Bulgaria by the country's Communications Regulatory Commission (CRC) Bulgaria completed the transition to digital broadcasting in September 2013.

The transition from analogue to digital terrestrial television (digitalization) in Bulgaria (initially with a deadline of December 31, 2012, as well as in other EU countries) was postponed initially to September 1, 2013, and then to September 30, 2013.

At the end of 2012, an information campaign on digitalization was launched

== Simulcast ==
First regular digital broadcast started on 1 March 2013. Analog broadcasting will be definitely terminated at 1 September 2013. The Simulcast period (time between digital broadcast switch-on and analog broadcast switch-off) will allow people time to buy new integrated Digital TVs or set-top boxes. On 30 September 2013 the simulcast period was officially put to an end.

== Television and radio programmes broadcast through multiplexes ==
TV Channels
Multiplex	TV Channels	Broadcast period	Format	Language
MUX 1 (2013-2016)	Bulgaria On Air	March 1, 2013 - April 1, 2015	16x9	Bulgarian
MUX 1 (2013-2016)	Evropa TV	July 7, 2016 - November 1, 2016	16x9	Bulgarian
MUX 1 (2013-2016)	Folklor TV	June 9, 2016 - November 1, 2016	16x9	Bulgarian
MUX 2 (2013-Present)	BNT 1	December 10, 2016 - present	16x9	Bulgarian
MUX 2 (2013-Present)	BNT 2	December 10, 2016 - present	16x9	Bulgarian
MUX 2 (2013-Present)	BNT 3	December 10, 2016 - present	16x9	Bulgarian
MUX 2 (2013-Present)	bTV	March 1, 2013 - present	16x9	Bulgarian
MUX 2 (2013-Present)	NOVA	March 1, 2013 - present	16x9	Bulgarian
MUX 2 (2013-Present)	Bulgaria On Air	April 1, 2015 - present	16x9	Bulgarian
MUX 2 (2013-Present)	TV7	March 1, 2013 - December 11, 2015	16x9	Bulgarian
MUX 2 (2013-Present)	NEWS7	March 7, 2013 - December 11, 2015	16x9	Bulgarian
MUX 2 (2013-Present)	bTV Lady +1*	September 30, 2013 - May 27, 2014	16x9	Bulgarian
MUX 2 (2013-Present)	RING.BG +1*	September 30, 2013 - May 27, 2014	16x9	Bulgarian
MUX 2 (2013-Present)	Diema Family +1*	September 30, 2013 - September 30, 2014	4x3	Bulgarian
MUX 3 (2013-2016)	BNT 1	March 1, 2013 - December 10, 2016	16x9	Bulgarian
MUX 3 (2013-2016)	BNT 1 HD	March 1, 2013 - December 10, 2016	16x9	Bulgarian
MUX 3 (2013-2016)	BNT 2	March 1, 2013 - December 10, 2016	4x3	Bulgarian
MUX 3 (2013-2016)	BNT HD	February 7, 2014 - December 10, 2016	16x9	Bulgarian
MUX 3 (2013-2016)	BNT World	March 1, 2013 - March 2, 2013	4x3	Bulgarian
MUX 12 Sofia (2013-Present)	BNT 1	March 1, 2013 - December 10, 2016	16x9	Bulgarian
MUX 12 Sofia (2013-Present)	The Voice	March 1, 2013 - December 2023	16x9	Bulgarian, English
MUX 12 Sofia (2013-Present)	VTV (Vest TV)	March 1, 2013 - November 1, 2016	4x3	Bulgarian
MUX 12 Sofia (2013-Present)	Alfa TV	April 1, 2014 - May 2016; April 2018 - November 2020	4x3	Bulgarian
MUX 12 Sofia (2013-Present)	Bulgaria On Air	April 1, 2015 - present	16x9	Bulgarian
MUX 12 Sofia (2013-Present)	Fen Folk TV	December 2016 - 2017	16x9	Bulgarian
MUX 12 Sofia (2013-Present)	Euronews Bulgaria (Formerly: TV Evropa)	March 1, 2013 - July 7, 2016 November 1, 2016 - present	16x9	Bulgarian
MUX 12 Sofia (2013-Present)	Folklor TV	December 2016 - present	16x9	Bulgarian
MUX 12 Sofia (2013-Present)	NOVA News (Formerly: Kanal 3)	December 2016 - present	16x9	Bulgarian

Radio Channels

Multiplex	Radio Channels	Broadcast Period	Language
MUX 12 Sofia (2013-Present)	BNR Horizon	March 6th, 2013 - December 2016	Bulgarian
MUX 12 Sofia (2013-Present)	BNT Hristo Botev	March 6th, 2013 - December 2016	Bulgarian

^{* The program of the channels is broadcast on air with 1 hour delay (+1)}

== Technical information ==
Standards chosen are DVB-T and MPEG4 AVC/H.264 compression format. DVB-T2 will not be used for now.

== SFN Allotments in Bulgaria ==
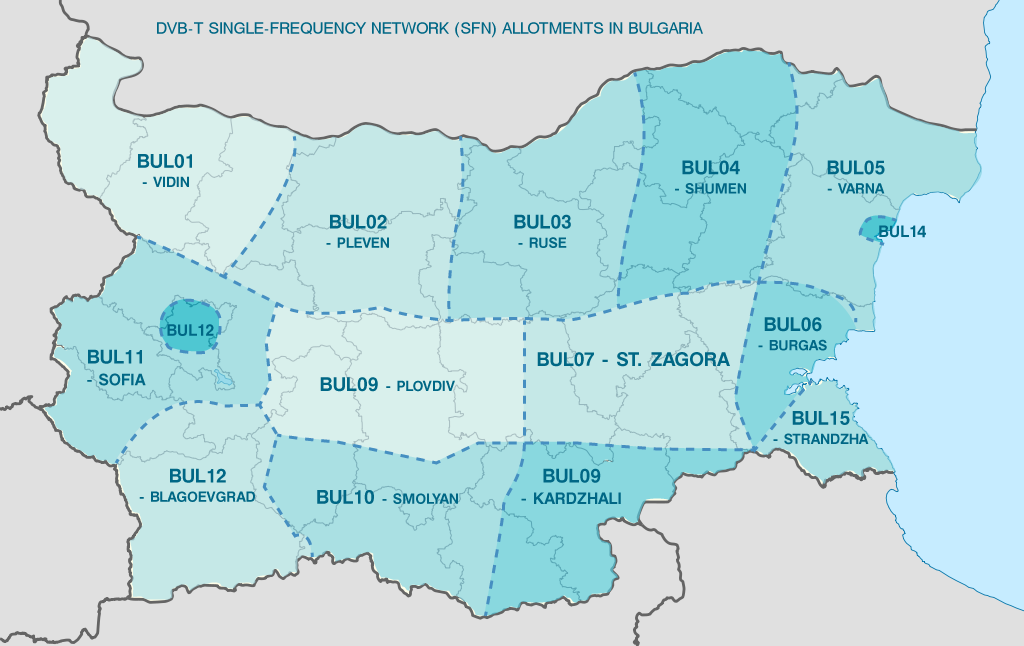
DVB-T single-frequency network (SFN) Allotments in Bulgaria

Frequency of Channels by SFN Allotments
Allotment	Cities	Multiplex	Channel
BUL01 - Vidin	Belogradchik, Berkovitsa, Vidin, Vratsa, Lom	MUX 1	32
BUL01 - Vidin	Belogradchik, Berkovitsa, Vidin, Vratsa, Lom	MUX 2	49
BUL01 - Vidin	Belogradchik, Berkovitsa, Vidin, Vratsa, Lom	MUX 3	53
BUL02 - Pleven	Belene, Etropole, Lovech, Mezdra, Pleven, Pravets, Teteven, Troyan, Cherven bryag	MUX 1	51
BUL02 - Pleven	Belene, Etropole, Lovech, Mezdra, Pleven, Pravets, Teteven, Troyan, Cherven bryag	MUX 2	57
BUL02 - Pleven	Belene, Etropole, Lovech, Mezdra, Pleven, Pravets, Teteven, Troyan, Cherven bryag	MUX 3	41
BUL03 - Ruse	Veliko Tarnovo, Gabrovo, Dryanovo, Elena, Rousse, Svishtov, Sevlievo, Tryavna	MUX 1	26
BUL03 - Ruse	Veliko Tarnovo, Gabrovo, Dryanovo, Elena, Rousse, Svishtov, Sevlievo, Tryavna	MUX 2	49
BUL03 - Ruse	Veliko Tarnovo, Gabrovo, Dryanovo, Elena, Rousse, Svishtov, Sevlievo, Tryavna	MUX 3	58
BUL04 - Shumen	Veliki Preslav, Kaspichan, Kotel, Novi Pazar, Popovo, Razgrad, Silistra, Targovishte, Shumen	MUX 1	28
BUL04 - Shumen	Veliki Preslav, Kaspichan, Kotel, Novi Pazar, Popovo, Razgrad, Silistra, Targovishte, Shumen	MUX 2	40
BUL04 - Shumen	Veliki Preslav, Kaspichan, Kotel, Novi Pazar, Popovo, Razgrad, Silistra, Targovishte, Shumen	MUX 3	51
BUL05 - Varna	Beloslav, Byala, Varna, Dobrich, Obzor, Provadia, Tervel, Shabla	MUX 1	22
BUL05 - Varna	Beloslav, Byala, Varna, Dobrich, Obzor, Provadia, Tervel, Shabla	MUX 2	29
BUL05 - Varna	Beloslav, Byala, Varna, Dobrich, Obzor, Provadia, Tervel, Shabla	MUX 3	27
BUL06 - Burgas	Aytos, Ahtopol, Bourgas, Malko Tarnovo, Nesebar, Primorsko, Tsarevo	MUX 1	42
BUL06 - Burgas	Aytos, Ahtopol, Bourgas, Malko Tarnovo, Nesebar, Primorsko, Tsarevo	MUX 2	47
BUL06 - Burgas	Aytos, Ahtopol, Bourgas, Malko Tarnovo, Nesebar, Primorsko, Tsarevo	MUX 3	55
BUL07 - Stara Zagora	Elhovo, Karnobat, Nova Zagora, Sliven, Stara Zagora	MUX 1	22
BUL07 - Stara Zagora	Elhovo, Karnobat, Nova Zagora, Sliven, Stara Zagora	MUX 2	37
BUL07 - Stara Zagora	Elhovo, Karnobat, Nova Zagora, Sliven, Stara Zagora	MUX 3	64
BUL08 - Kardzhali	Dimitrovgrad, Ivailovgrad, Kardzhali, Svilengrad, Harmanli, Haskovo	MUX 1	26
BUL08 - Kardzhali	Dimitrovgrad, Ivailovgrad, Kardzhali, Svilengrad, Harmanli, Haskovo	MUX 2	42
BUL08 - Kardzhali	Dimitrovgrad, Ivailovgrad, Kardzhali, Svilengrad, Harmanli, Haskovo	MUX 3	45
BUL09 - Plovdiv	Kazanlak, Kostenets, Panagyurishte, Plovdiv	MUX 1	25
BUL09 - Plovdiv	Kazanlak, Kostenets, Panagyurishte, Plovdiv	MUX 2	35
BUL09 - Plovdiv	Kazanlak, Kostenets, Panagyurishte, Plovdiv	MUX 3	41
BUL10 - Smolyan	Batak, Velingrad, Dospat, Zlatograd, Smolyan	MUX 1	34
BUL10 - Smolyan	Batak, Velingrad, Dospat, Zlatograd, Smolyan	MUX 2	49
BUL10 - Smolyan	Batak, Velingrad, Dospat, Zlatograd, Smolyan	MUX 3	58
BUL11 - Sofia	Breznik, Dupnitsa, Zemen, Kyustendil, Samokov, Svoge, Sofia, Tran	MUX 1	23
BUL11 - Sofia	Breznik, Dupnitsa, Zemen, Kyustendil, Samokov, Svoge, Sofia, Tran	MUX 2	40
BUL11 - Sofia	Breznik, Dupnitsa, Zemen, Kyustendil, Samokov, Svoge, Sofia, Tran	MUX 3	52
BUL12 - Sofia-grad	Sofia	MUX 1	23
BUL12 - Sofia-grad	Sofia	MUX 2	40
BUL12 - Sofia-grad	Sofia	MUX 3	52
BUL12 - Sofia-grad	Sofia	MUX BUL12-1	64
BUL13 - Blagoevgrad	Blagoevgrad, Gotse Delchev, Melnik, Razlog, Rila, Yakoruda	MUX 1	31
BUL13 - Blagoevgrad	Blagoevgrad, Gotse Delchev, Melnik, Razlog, Rila, Yakoruda	MUX 2	29
BUL13 - Blagoevgrad	Blagoevgrad, Gotse Delchev, Melnik, Razlog, Rila, Yakoruda	MUX 3	33
BUL14 - Varna-grad	Varna	MUX 1	22
BUL14 - Varna-grad	Varna	MUX 2	29
BUL14 - Varna-grad	Varna	MUX 3	27
BUL15 - Strandzha	///	MUX 1	42
BUL15 - Strandzha	///	MUX 2	47
BUL15 - Strandzha	///	MUX 3	55

== Technical parameters of digital terrestrial television in Bulgaria ==
• Standard: DVB-T

• Frequency range: Decimeter (UHF)

• Polarization: vertical

• Channel width: 8 MHz

• Guard interval: 1/4

• Code ratio (FEC): 2/3

• Modulation: 64QAM

• Transport rate: 19.91 Mbit/s

• Video encoding: MPEG-4

• Audio encoding SD programs: MPEG-1 Layer II

• Audio encoding HD programs: HE AAC
