= Anastenaria =

Greek firewalking ritual

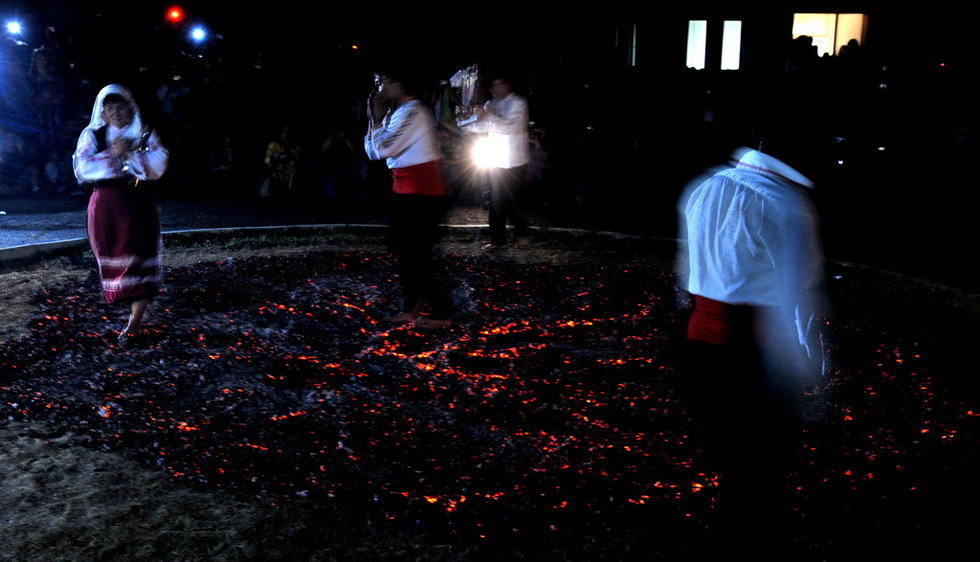
Firewalkers in Bulgaria

The Anastenaria (Greek: Αναστενάρια, Bulgarian: Нестинарство, romanized: Nestinarstvo) is a traditional barefoot firewalking ritual with ecstatic dance performed in some villages in Northern Greece and Southern Bulgaria. The communities which celebrate this ritual are descended from refugees who entered Greece from Eastern Thrace following the Balkan Wars of 1911–12 and the Population exchange between Greece and Turkey in 1923.

== Ritual cycle ==
The Bulgarian and Greek villages perform a unique annual ritual cycle, which begins on May 21 and ends on May 23 every year. The central figures of the tradition are Saint Constantine and Saint Helen, but all the significant days in this cycle coincide with important days in the Greek Orthodox calendar and are related to various Christian saints. The two major events in this cycle are two big festivals, one in January and particularly one in May, dedicated to these two saints. Each of the festivals lasts for three days and involves various processions, music and dancing, and an animal sacrifice. The festival culminates with a firewalking ritual, where the participants, carrying the icons of saints Constantine and Helen, dance ecstatically for hours before entering the fire and walking barefoot over the glowing-red coals, unharmed by the fire.

Each community of the Anastenaria has a special shrine known as the konaki, where their holy icons are placed, as well as the "signs" of the saints (semadia), votive offerings and red kerchiefs attached to the icons. Here, on the eve of the saints' day, May 20, they gather to dance to the music of the Thracian lyre and drum. After some time, they believe that they may be "seized" by Saint Constantine and enter a trance. On the morning of the saints' day, May 21, they gather at the konaki and proceed to a well to be blessed with holy water and to sacrifice animals. The rules about the nature of the beasts to be slain are precise, but differ from village to village. In the evening a fire is lit in an open space, and after dancing for some time in the konaki, the anastenarides go to it carrying their icons. After dancing around it in a circle, individual anastenarides dance over the hot coals as the saint moves them. The ritual is also performed in January, during the festival of Saint Athanasius, and fire-walking is done indoors.

== Origins ==
According to some myths the custom originated in the Middle Ages when the church of Saint Constantine in their original home in Kosti, now in Bulgaria, caught fire, and the voices of the saints calling for help could be heard from inside. The villagers who braved the flames to rescue them were unharmed, being protected by the saints. Other ethnographers, however, have argued that the Anastenaria are vestiges of ancient practices of cults of Dionysus.

In Bulgaria, the right to perform the ritual was hereditary and the head nestinar was succeeded only by his or her son or daughter, and only when he or she was too old or ill to continue performing it. The head nestinar's house was sacred, because it housed the stolnina (столнина) – a small chapel where icons of several saints were arranged, as well as a sacred drum used specifically for the ritual and believed to cure the drummer if he was ill.

== Tourism ==
In the 20th century the ritual became commercialized and is performed for tourists in the seaside resorts of the Bulgarian Black Sea Coast by people who have little to do with the original tradition. The rituals survive in more authentic form in five villages of northern Greece: Ayia Eleni, Langadas, Meliki, Mavrolefki, and Kerkini; and in six Bulgarian villages in the Strandzha Mountains: Balgari, Gramatikovo, Slivarovo, Kondolovo, Kosti, and Brodilovo.

While visiting Bulgaria on July 11, 2024, famous streamer iShowSpeed attempted the ritual on a YouTube IRL stream.

== Heritage ==
In 2009, the ritual was entered in the UNESCO Intangible Cultural Heritage Lists and the National Representative List of the Intangible Cultural Heritage "Living Human Treasures - Bulgaria" on the application of the Regional historical museum Burgas.

Nestinari Nunataks on Livingston Island in the South Shetland Islands, Antarctica, are named after the Bulgarian folkloric ritual of Nestinari.
