= 2011 Bulgaria foot-and-mouth disease outbreak =

Animal disease outbreak in Bulgaria

Locations of FMD outbreaks in Bulgaria in 2011

2011 Bulgaria foot-and-mouth disease outbreak is an outbreak of foot-and-mouth disease (FMD) occurring in Southeastern Bulgaria in 2011.

FMD was first confirmed on 5 January 2011, in a wild boar that had been shot on 30 December 2010. This animal is believed to have crossed the Bulgarian-Turkish border near the village of Kosti, Burgas Province in the Strandzha Mountains. A necropsy revealed foot-and mouth disease. Following this, 37 infected animals were discovered in the village of Kosti, and all susceptible livestock there were culled. Burgas Province and seven other neighbouring provinces declared a quarantine.

On 14 January a new outbreak was suspected in the neighbouring village of Rezovo. It is believed to have been carried by a Turkish cattle herd. On 17 January the presence of the disease was confirmed. The Bulgarian authorities ordered culling of all susceptible livestock in Rezovo. The losses in the two villages are promised to be compensated.

The mayor of Tsarevo Municipality Petko Arnaudov proposed construction of a wire fence along the Turkish border to prevent any further movement of diseased animals into Bulgaria. The proposal was accepted by the Ministry of Agriculture and Forestry. The authorities ordered disinfection of all vehicles crossing from Turkey, where a major outbreak was occurring.

On 31 January in the village of Gramatikovo, Malko Tarnovo Municipality, which is located in the 10 km prevention zone around the first two outbreaks, a new outbreak was discovered. The blood tests found 13 animals infected with the disease. The authorities ordered culling of all susceptible livestock in the village, which consists of 149 animals - 1 cow, 38 sheep and 110 goats. The losses are promised to be compensated.

On 25 March two new outbreaks were discovered in the villages of Granichar and Kirovo. The authorities ordered culling of 173 infected animals.

The last new case was detected in April 2011; Bulgaria was declared FMD-free in July 2011. Prior to this outbreak, Bulgaria had not had a case of FMD since 1996.
