= Dog spinning =

Ritual practiced in Bulgaria

Dog spinning (Bulgarian: тричане на куче(та), trichane na kuche(ta)) is a ritual that was traditionally practiced on the first day of Lent in the village of Brodilovo in southeastern Bulgaria. The ritual is thought to have pagan origins and was performed in order to prevent rabies.

In dog spinning, a dog is suspended above water on a rope. The dog is turned repeatedly in a given direction to wind the rope, or is inserted into a loop of rope that has been twisted already. The dog is then released so that it spins rapidly in the opposite direction as the rope unwinds, and falls into the water once the rope has run out.

== History ==
Historically the ritual was performed in many other parts of Bulgaria as well and although the exact practice varied regionally, e.g. whipping or beating the dogs instead of spinning them, it was performed on the same date and with the same goal. Reports of this type of ritual can be found as early as 1869.

== Animal welfare concerns ==
The Swedish newspaper Aftonbladet reported protests at the Bulgarian Embassy in Stockholm about the cruelty of this tradition. These occurred as Bulgaria prepared to join the European Union in 2005.

A reference in English is in a press release issued by the Green Party of England and Wales, issued on July 29, 2005. It includes a statement from Green Party MEP Caroline Lucas, vice-president of the RSPCA and the European Parliament's cross-party Animal Welfare Intergroup. Dr Lucas criticised it as being cruel to dogs, saying "Dog-spinning is a barbaric practice and must not be allowed to continue into the 21st century."

The Sofia Echo reported the practice in March 2011.

The practice of the ritual was banned by the mayor of Tsarevo in 2006 after complaints by Bulgarian animal welfare organizations. There have been reports of the practice continuing sporadically, and animal welfare organisations have tried to ensure this does not happen.
