= Jan Sokol of Lamberk =

Moravian nobleman (c. 1355–1410)

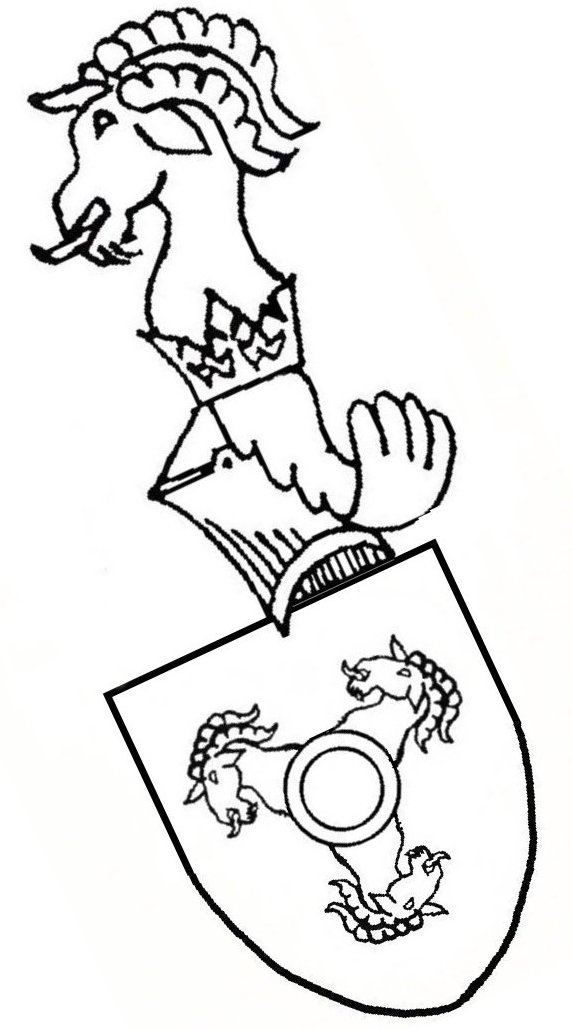
- Coat of arms
- Native name: Jan Sokol z Lamberka
- Born: c. 1355
- Died: 28 September 1410
- Issue: Jaroslav Sokol of Lamberk; Mikuláš Sokol of Lamberk
- Father: Jaroslav III of Knínice
- Mother: Hedvika

Jan Sokol of Lamberk (c. 1355 – 28 September 1410) was a Moravian military leader who became known during the internal disputes of members of the Luxembourg dynasty and from his participation of the Battle of Grunwald.

== Biography ==
Jan Sokol of Lamberk was born during the reign of Charles IV, Holy Roman Emperor. His father was Jaroslav III of Knínice, who sometime after 1360 moved to the village of Březník, and in 1370 likely built a castle there. Jaroslav became burgrave of Znojmo in 1356 and Hofmeister of John Henry, Margrave of Moravia in 1368. He later became involved in skirmishes between individual members of the ruling Luxembourg dynasty.

The first verified mentions of Jan Sokol come from 1396, when he testified when donating property to his sister-in-law, the widow of Jaroslav of Lamberk. The first reports of his military actions are from 1397. Even before this year, Jan Sokol, together with Vok III of Holštejn and Vok IV of Holštejn, plundered the estates of the Diocese of Olomouc and Kroměříž. They were subsequently excommunicated from the Church by the Bishop of Olomouc, Mikuláš of Rýzmburk. After the intervention of Margrave Jobst of Moravia, and promises of not harassing the land again, the new bishop Jan XI Mráz lifted the excommunication in 1403.

After the abduction of King Wenceslaus IV, Jan Sokol's tactics combined with John of Görlitz's political power contributed to his release. Jan Sokol was named provincial governor, and counted Henry III of Rosenberg, Sigismund of Luxembourg, and Albert II of Germany among his enemies.

Jan Sokol inherited Lamberk Castle. He is known early in his career to have been in the service of Prokop of Moravia during the Moravian Margrave Wars, but he fought for Margrave Jobst when he seized the town of Laa an der Thaya in 1407, and was part of the defense against Leopold IV, Duke of Austria. Jan Sokol then entered the service of Leopold in his conflicts against Ernest, Duke of Austria.

By 1409, Jan Sokol was part of the retinue of King Wenceslaus IV. Together with men such as Jan Žižka, Matěj Vůdce, and Racek Kobyla, he waged a guerilla campaign against the Rosenberg family, enemies of Wenceslaus.

=== Battle of Grunwald ===
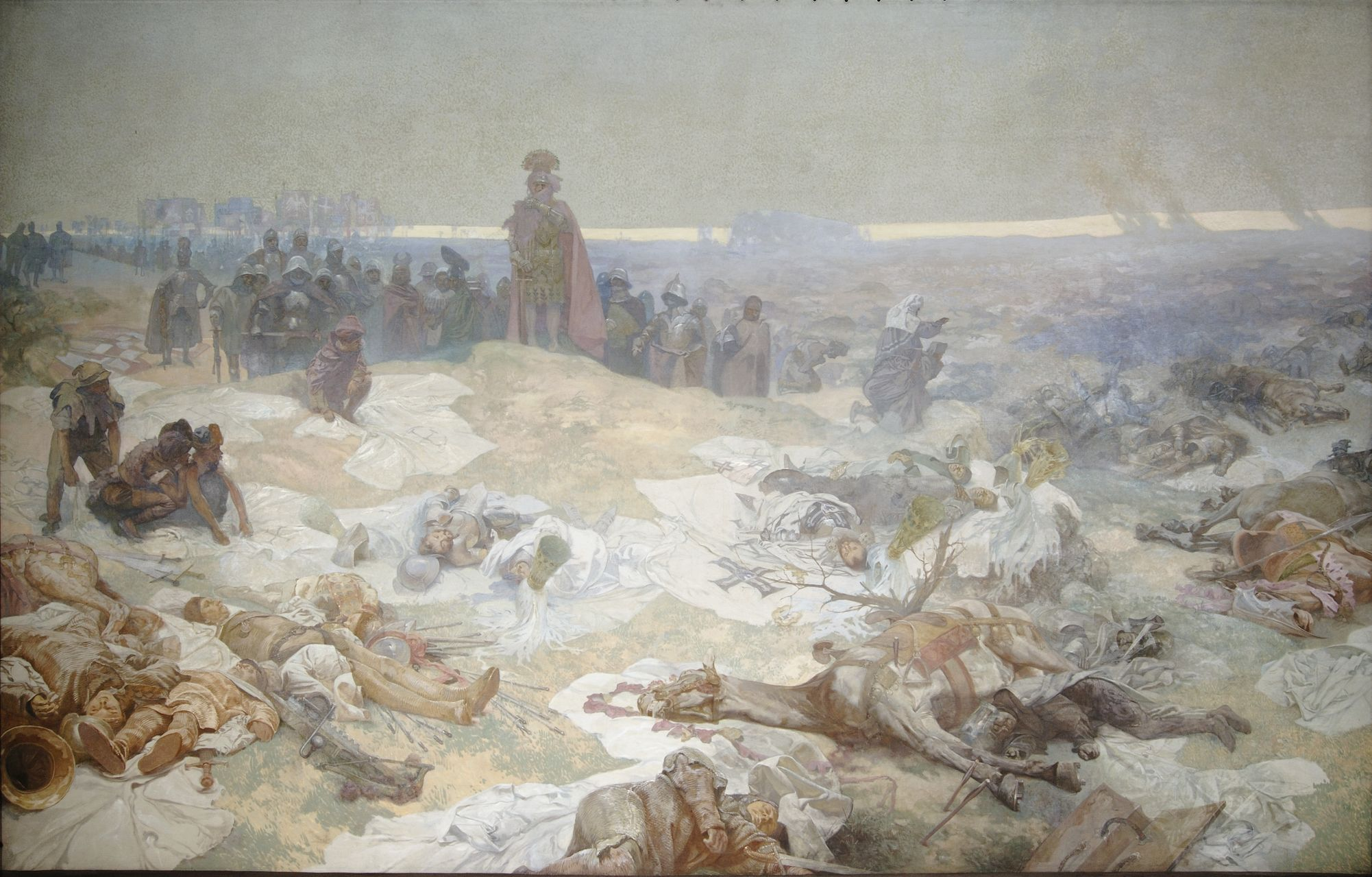
After the Battle of Grunewald (1924) by Alfons Mucha

In 1410, Jan Sokol assisted the Polish–Lithuanian coalition against the Teutonic Knights in the Battle of Grunwald. Together with Stanislav of Dobrá Voda, he commanded the fourth Polish banner of St. George, consisting of about 1,500 horsemen. After the victory of the Poles, he participated in the conquest of further castles and became the administrator of Radzyń Chełmiński Castle. After the Peace of Thorn, the castle was returned to the Teutonic Knights.

=== Death ===
Jan Sokol of Lamberk died on 28 September 1410 after a feast in Toruń, to which he was invited by Polish King Władysław II Jagiełło. The cause of death was allegedly improperly prepared fish, but it is speculated that he was intentionally poisoned.

== Legacy ==
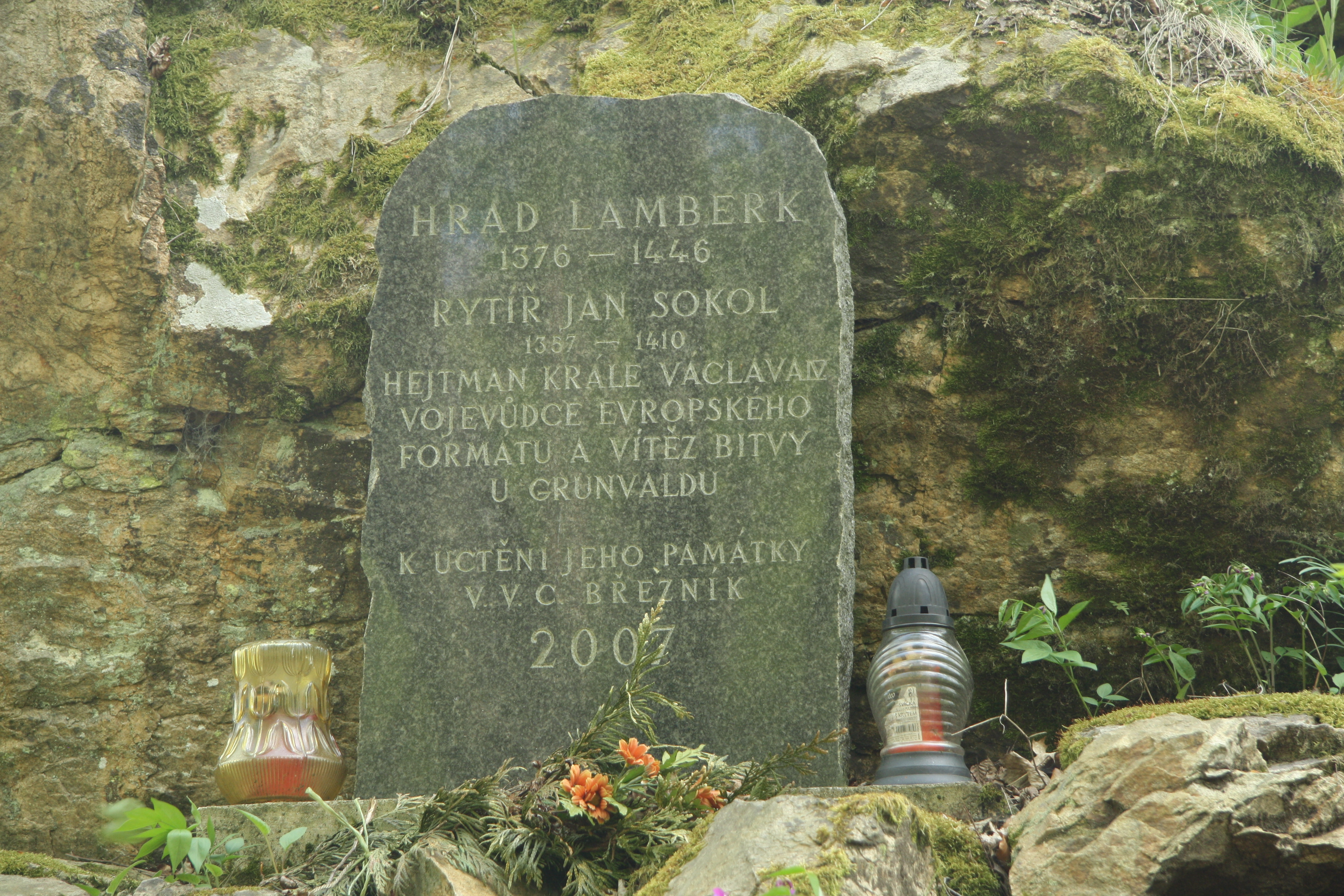
Memorial to Jan Sokol at Lamberk Castle in the territory of Březník

Jan Sokol was depicted in Alphonse Mucha's painting After the Battle of Grunewald (1924). In the left part of the painting, a figure in a crusader cloak kneels, and behind him stands a warrior in armor and a broad helmet. Directly behind him is Sokol and to the left next to him is Jan Žižka.

The appearance of Jan Sokol's coat of arms is not fully known. It has been described by August Sedláček, but the color palette is unknown as only the seal on a document from 1402 has been preserved.

Jan Sokol (as John Sokol of Lamberg) is mentioned in the 2018 video game Kingdom Come: Deliverance and its 2025 sequel Kingdom Come: Deliverance II. The Age of Empires II expansion released in 2021, Dawn of the Dukes, has Sokol in Jan Zizka's early campaign.
