= Rezovo =

Rezovo Резово
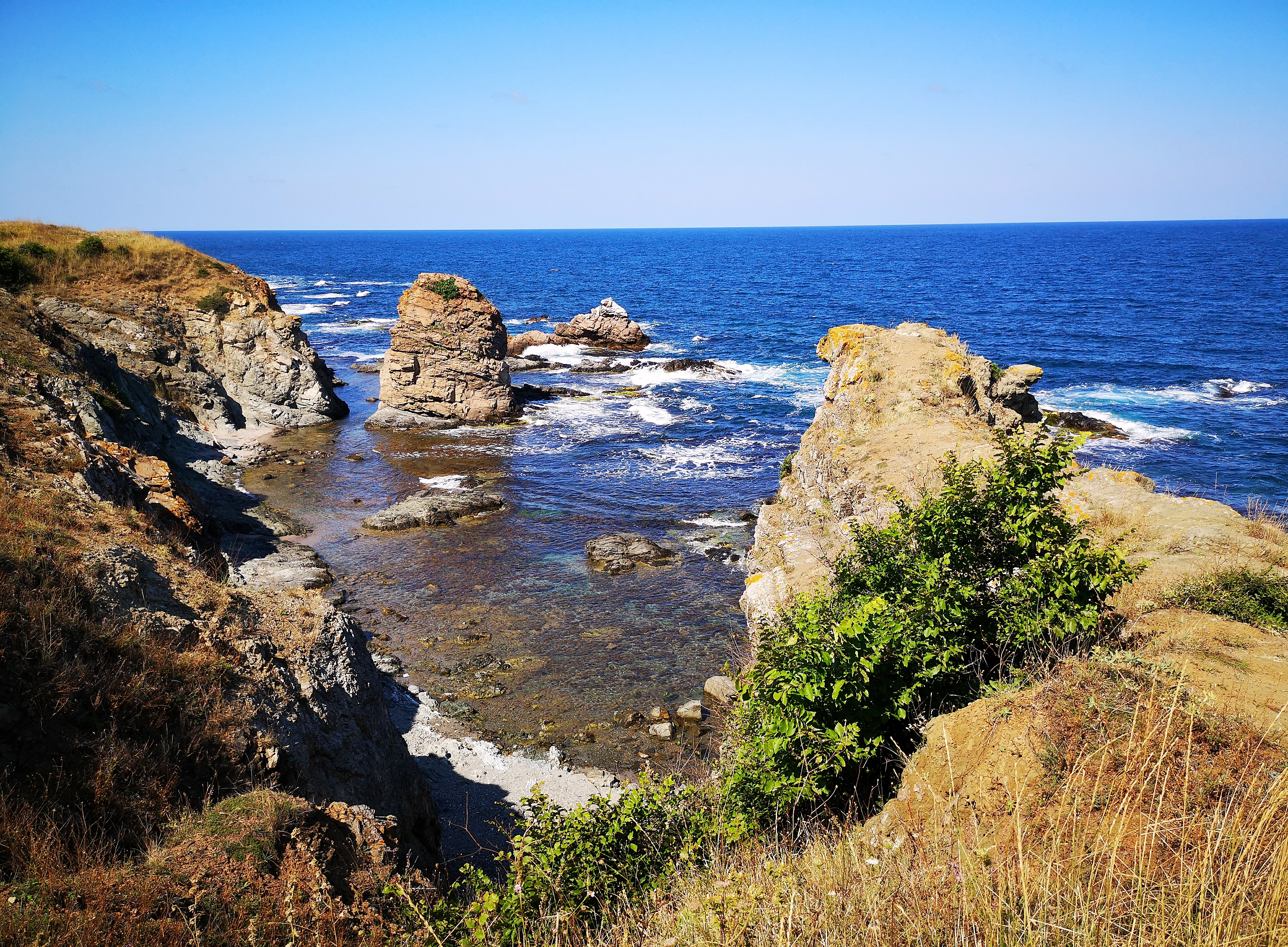
- Rezovo's coast

- Location of Rezovo
- Coordinates: 41°59′N 28°1′E
- Country: Bulgaria
- Provinces (Oblast): Burgas
- Municipality: Tsarevo

Government
  - Mayor: Marin Dimov
- Elevation: 0 m (0 ft)

Population (2024)
  - Total: 77
- Time zone: UTC+2 (EET)
  - Summer (DST): UTC+3 (EEST)
- Postal code: 8281
- Area code: 0550

Rezovo (Bulgarian: Резово, pronounced [ˈrɛzovo]) is a village and seaside resort in far southeastern Bulgaria, part of Tsarevo Municipality, Burgas Province, in the coastal Strandzha geographical region. It is situated on the Bulgaria–Turkey border.

== Geography ==
The village is in Strandzha Nature Park. Lying at the mouth of the Rezovo River in the Black Sea, Rezovo is the southernmost point of the Bulgarian Black Sea Coast and the southeasternmost inhabited place in Bulgaria and the European Union mainland. The village is 11 kilometres south of Sinemorets, 17 km from Ahtopol and 36 km from Lozenets. As the Rezovo River constitutes the border between Bulgaria and the European part of Turkey, Rezovo directly overlooks the Turkish bank of the river and the Turkish village of Beğendik, in Demirköy district, Kırklareli Province. Rezovo is the most southeastern point of the continental EU.

== History ==
Researchers have attempted to link the village's name to that of Rhesus of Thrace, a Thracian king of the Iliad, and although the existence of an ancient settlement at the place of the modern village has been proven (with the oldest artifacts dating to the 4th century BC), it is hard to establish any connection with Rhesus' personality. In ancient times, the area was subject to large-scale metallurgical activity, with the largest ancient deposit of slag in Bulgaria. It is believed that the medieval fortress of Castrition lay on Cape Kastrich north of modern Rezovo.

Today's village was first mentioned in Ottoman registers as Rezvi, a village of 41 Christian families. In the 18th century, it was noted as Büyük Rezve ("Big Rezve") and marked as a sea port on Ottoman maps. According to Austrian Wenzel von Brognard and other 18th-century western travellers, the river mouth at that place had a good wharf suitable as a storm and winter shelter. Rezovo has changed its location slightly several times: its oldest known location is the same as today's, at the coast. However, the locals were forced to move inland because of persistent raids by Caucasian Laz pirates, settling during the 19th century in the Kladarsko Bardo area 10 kilometres to the west, also along the Rezovo River. By 1900, that "Old Rezovo" had 70–80 houses and an Eastern Orthodox church of Saint Elijah the Forerunner. The seaside land was not completely abandoned, as it was used as a pasture because of the favourable climate.

In 1903, the residents of Rezovo took an active part in the Bulgarian Ilinden-Preobrazhenie Uprising, seeking unification with their compatriots in the Principality of Bulgaria. However, the revolt was crushed by the Ottoman authorities and most of Old Rezovo was burned to the ground. The surviving locals settled on the coast, approximately where the oldest known incarnation of the village had been. The Church of Saints Constantine and Helena was built in 1906. After the Balkan Wars of 1912–1913, Rezovo became part of the Kingdom of Bulgaria and a limited number of Bulgarian refugees (25 families) from other parts of Eastern Thrace that remained under Ottoman rule settled in the village. According to Lyubomir Miletich's demographic survey of the Ottoman province of Edirne in The Destruction of Thracian Bulgarians in 1913, published in 1918, before the wars Rezovo (Рѣзово) was a village in the district of Vassiliko inhabited by 70 Bulgarian Exarchist families.

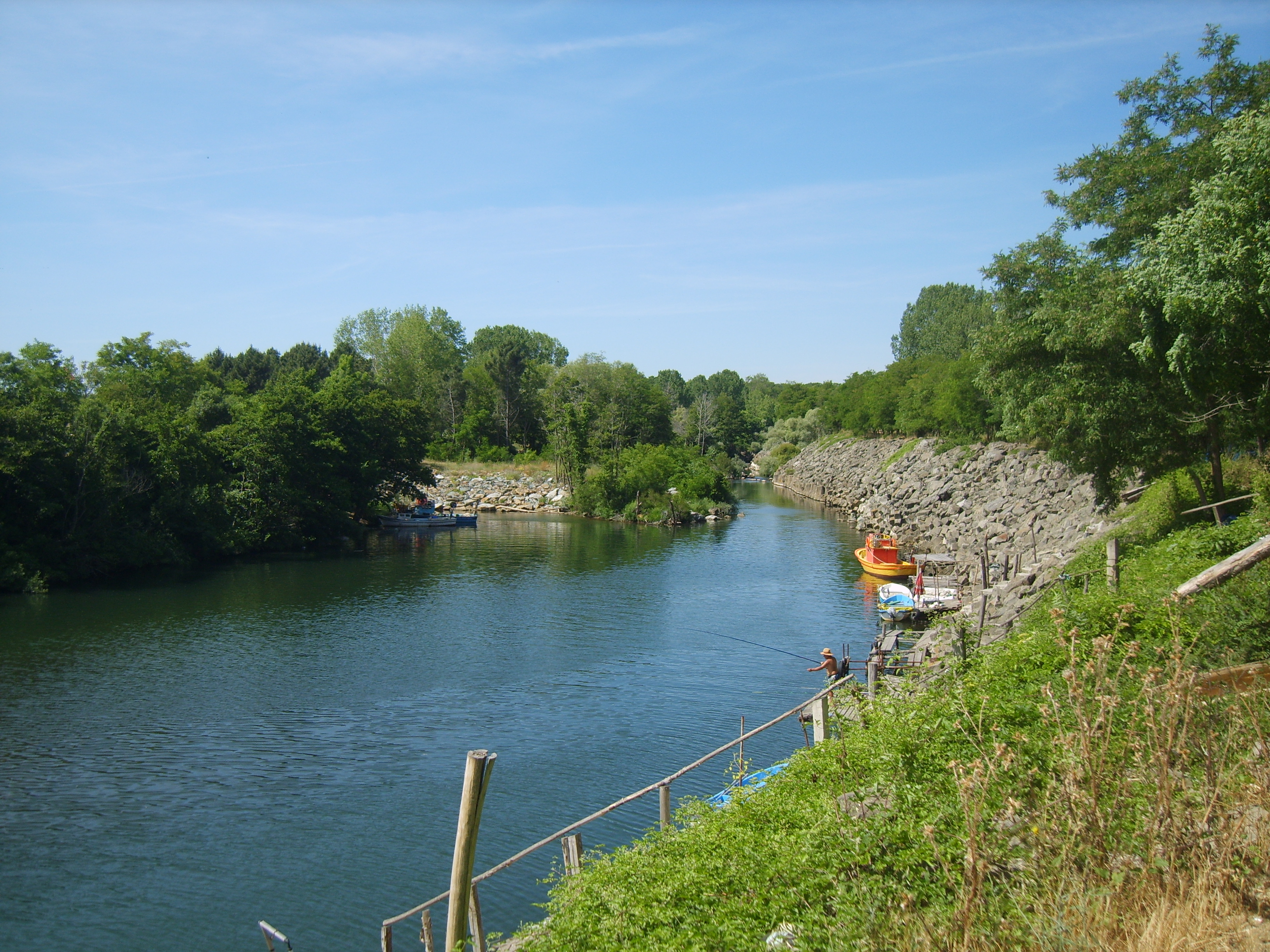
The mouth of the Rezovo River dividing Bulgaria and Turkey

After the wars, the main occupation of the locals was charcoal production and logging, with some agriculture, cattle breeding and fishing. Wood and charcoal were exported by means of the wooden pier in the Rezovo River. The population has gradually declined, however, but today Rezovo is a popular beach resort and a spot frequented by tourists because of its southeasternmost location. Until recently, it was part of the border zone and visitors were required to be checked by Border Police officials. As Bulgaria joined the European Union on 1 January 2007, Rezovo became the contiguous EU's southeasternmost point. On 2 January 2007, municipal mayor Petko Arnaudov hoisted the flag of Europe in the village, along with the national and municipal flags, and the street starting from the Bulgarian border sign was renamed the Europe Alley.

== Honour ==
Rezovski Creek on Livingston Island in the South Shetland Islands, Antarctica is named after Rezovo.
