= Varvara, Burgas Province =

Varvara Варвара
- Village
- Location within Bulgaria
- Coordinates: 42°7′N 27°54′E
- Country: Bulgaria
- Province: Burgas
- Municipality: Tsarevo

Government
  - Mayor: Marin Kirov

Area
  - Total: 18.272 km^{2} (7.055 sq mi)
- Elevation: 29 m (95 ft)

Population (2020)
  - Total: 266
  - Density: 14.6/km^{2} (37.7/sq mi)
- Time zone: UTC+2 (EET)
  - Summer (DST): UTC+3 (EEST)
- Postal code: 8278

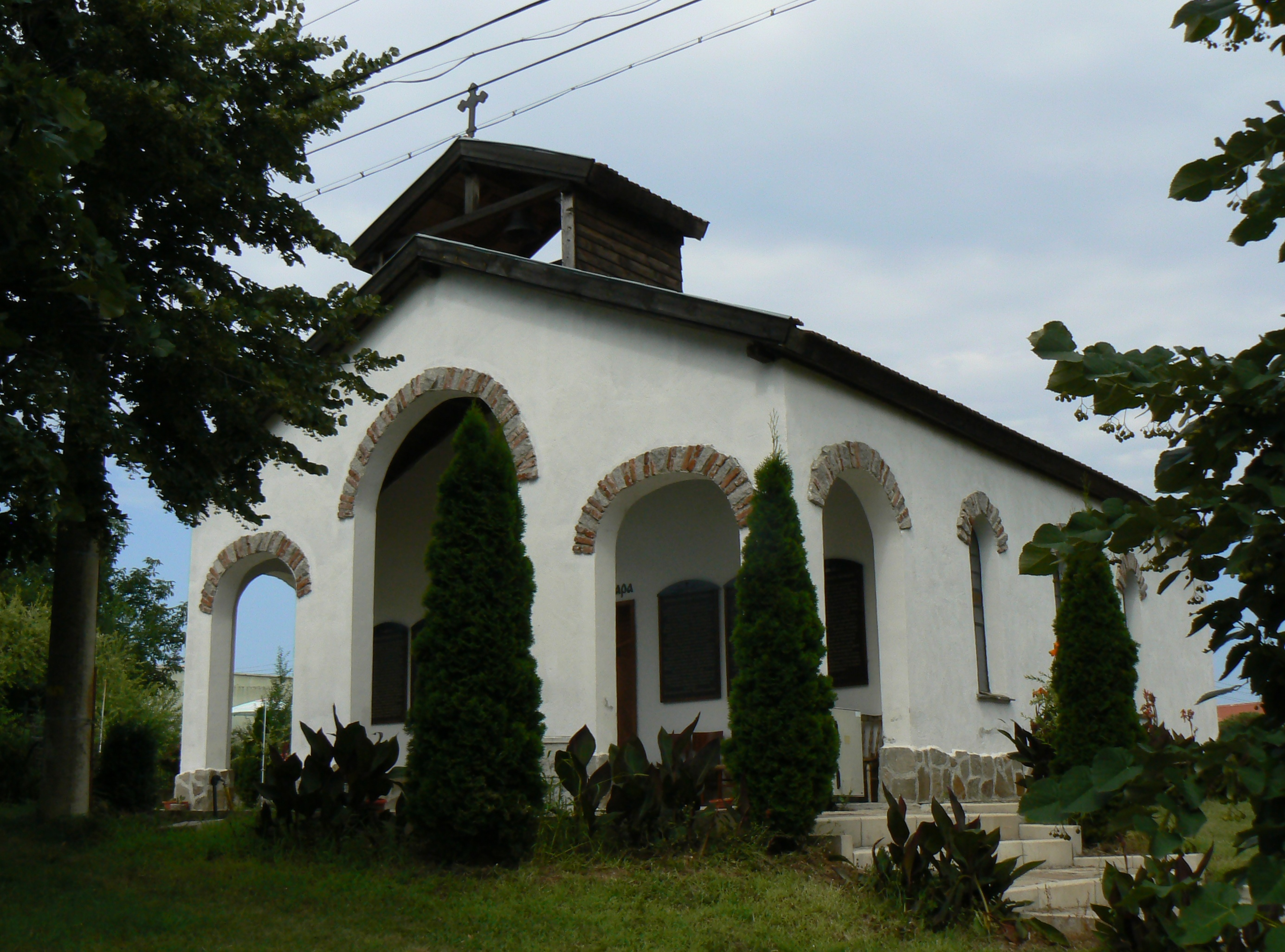
Church "Saint Varvara"

Varvara (Bulgarian: Варвара, Greek: Βαρβάρα) is a village in southeastern Bulgaria, located in the Tsarevo Municipality of the Burgas Province.

== Geography ==
This seaside resort is situated on the Black Sea coast within Strandzha Nature Park, between the towns of Tsarevo and Ahtopol, near the border with Turkey.

== History ==
In the middle of the 19th century, the site of the modern village was uninhabited, except for the small monastery or chapel of Saint Barbara with holy springs, after which the village was named. An older settlement may well have existed, as indicated by the marking of the name Vardarah on Max Šimek's 1748 and Christian Ludwig's 1788 map in that area. Until the Balkan Wars, Varvara was a small Ottoman village of ethnic Turkish refugees from northern Bulgaria who settled there following the Liberation of Bulgaria in the Russo-Turkish War of 1877-78. After 1913, the Turks moved out and were replaced by Bulgarian refugees from Eastern Thrace

The village is best known for its intellectual community of artists and writers. Many young artists came to Varvara in the 1970s and 1980s and populated a small camp called The Sea Club which the Academy of Arts in Sofia had purchased for them. Over the years a larger group of artists established themselves in Varvara and started to buy real estate and build a small community.

== Demographics ==
Many fishermen also live in the village. The population is from many backgrounds with an increasing number of Western Europeans taking up residence both seasonally and full-time. There is also a Romani community. The size of the village and its intellectual values have helped in the creation of a diverse yet close community who undertake many projects together such as the recent building of a new small church that was constructed in a combined effort of locals and some of the Bulgarians who form part of this community.

== Economy ==
The newly renovated road to Burgas puts the International Airport within an hour's drive. Besides fishing, the major source of income today is tourism. There is a secluded sandy beach, and one of the most famous diving areas on the Black Sea known as the Dardaneli lies next to the village. This is a series of underwater caves and canyons offering snorkeling and diving on the coast. There are also several family hotels, bars and restaurants.

== Places to visit ==
Varvara is known primarily for its beautiful sea. Although the sandy beach is quite small, it is among the most beautiful on the Black Sea coast. Due to its remoteness, the village has managed to preserve its pure nature and crystal clear sea waters. The village is surrounded by rocky bays suitable for spearfishing and diving.

There are traces of a late antique and medieval fortress on the nearby Papia peak.

Near Varvara is the Iron Tree, made especially for the filming of "The Great Night Bath". This is the place where hippies have been welcoming July morning for years.

== Annual events ==
In the first week of September, the Barbara Fair takes place for 2 days. In the evening of the first fire-dancing dances are organized, and at noon of the second - folk fights.

== Honour ==
Varvara Cove in Nelson Island in the South Shetland Islands, Antarctica is named after Varvara.
