= Mikuláš Sokol of Lamberk =

Moravian nobleman (died c. 1443)

- Native name: Mikuláš Sokol z Lamberka
- Died: c. 1443
- Father: Jan Sokol of Lamberk

Mikuláš Sokol of Lamberk (died c. 1443) was a Moravian military leader who was instrumental in the Hussite Wars, acting on the side of the Taborites.

== Biography ==
Mikuláš Sokol was born around the end of the 14th century, the son of Jan Sokol of Lamberk. He is first mentioned, along with his brother Jaroslav, as being under the banner of his father during the Polish–Lithuanian–Teutonic War. After the death of John Sokol, the brothers were educated at the University of Kraków. Mikuláš Sokol went on to command a company of 40 men, and attempted to seize land for himself.

During the outbreak of the Hussite Wars, Mikuláš Sokol supported Sigismund of Luxembourg and agreed to suppress Hussite activity within Moravia. However, by 1424, Mikuláš Sokol is mentioned as being among the Hussite representatives negotiating an armistice with Oldřich II of Rosenberg. He campaigned with Jan Žižka in 1424, and after Žižka's death, became the leader of remaining Moravian Taborites. He was mentioned as being in captivity in 1425.

In 1431, Mikuláš Sokol was defeated in the Battle of Waidhofen after returning from a raid in Lower Austria. He escaped, however, his brother remained imprisoned until 1433. After the Taborite defeat at the Battle of Lipany, he participated in diplomatic negotiations with Emperor Sigismund. By 1436, he served as a governor under Sigismund. He later fought on the side of Albert II of Germany, and acted an envoy, witness, and protector for Elizabeth of Luxembourg.

Mikuláš Sokol is last mentioned as being dead in a document dating 8 May 1443. The Lamberk family subsequently fell into obscurity.
