= Velkovtsi, Pernik Province =

Velkovtsi, Pernik Province Велковци
- Location within Bulgaria
- Coordinates: 42°40′0″N 22°56′40″E
- Country: Bulgaria
- Provinces (Oblast): Pernik
- Elevation: 700 m (2,300 ft)

Population (2010)
  - Total: 210
- Time zone: UTC+2 (EET)
  - Summer (DST): UTC+3 (EEST)
- Postal Code: 2375
- Area code: 07755
- License plate: B

Velkovtsi (Bulgarian: Велковци) is a village in western Bulgaria. It belongs to the municipality of Breznik, in the district of Pernik. It is situated at 8 km from Breznik and at about 30 km from the capital Sofia. One of the biggest neighbourhoods of the village is Pali Lula, located on the main road Batanovtsi - Breznik.

== History ==
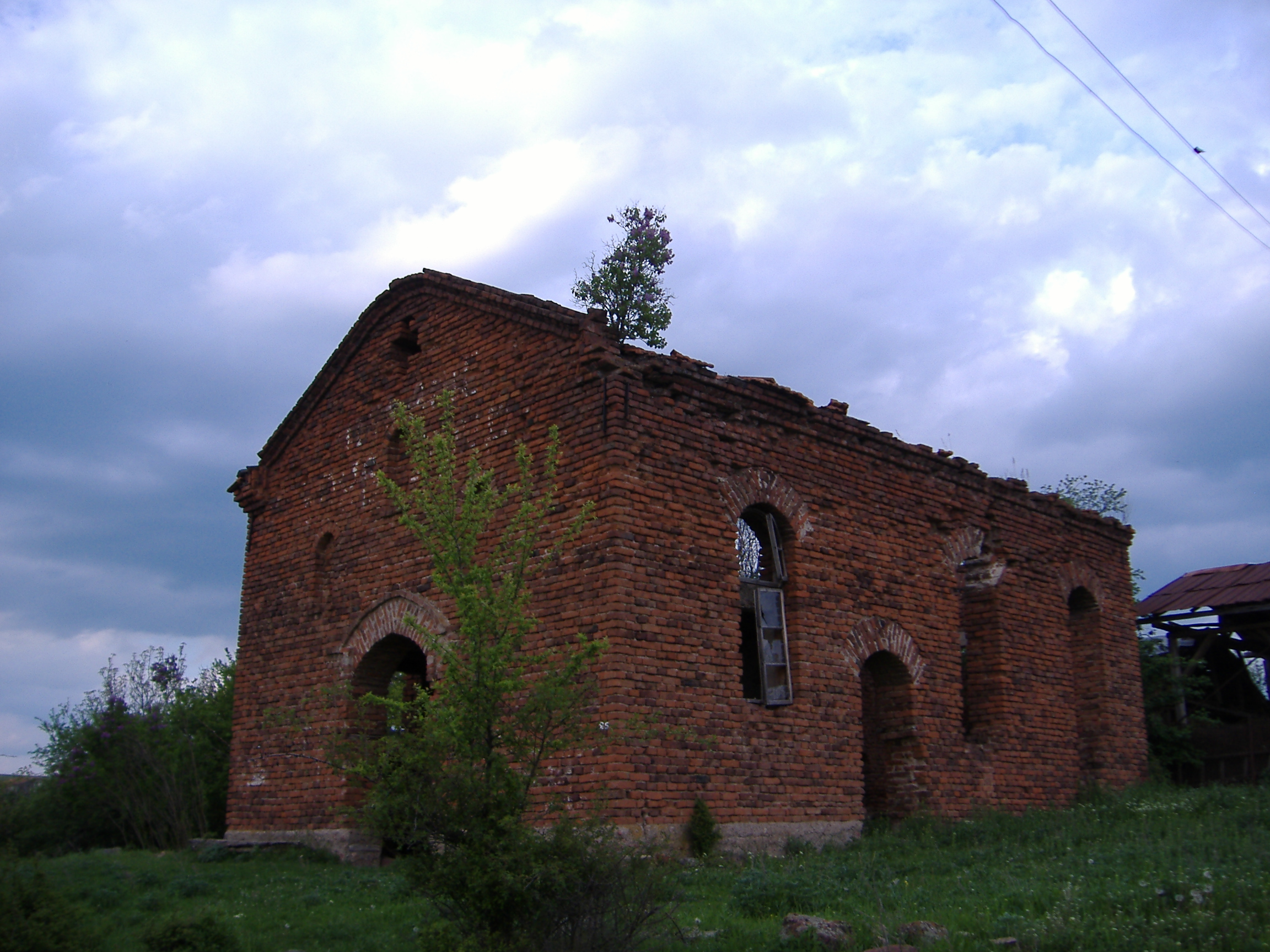
The church 'Saint Anna'

The local school was built in 1923 with donations from the villagers. The school had four classrooms and was named after Hristo Botev. The building of the church to be named 'Sn. Anna' (Света Ана) started in 1926 but was never completed, and after 1944 abandoned. The little monastery at the edge of the village was destroyed the same year.
