= Battle of Waidhofen =

Battle of the Hussite Wars

Coordinates: 48.8194°N 15.2839°E

- Part of Hussite Wars
Date	14 October 1431
Location	Waidhofen, Austria
Result	Austro-Bohemian victory

Belligerents
Duchy of Austria: Lower Austrian troops; Bohemian city garrisons of Znojmo and České Budějovice	Taborites

Commanders and leaders
Ulrich Eicinger; Martin Eicinger; Lipolt Krajíř z Krajku; Jiří Laun	Mikuláš Sokol of Lamberg

Strength
Unknown	4,500 infantry 600 cavalry

Casualties and losses
Unknown	700–1,000 killed 500–700 captured

The Battle of Waidhofen took place on 14 October 1431 near the present town of Waidhofen an der Thaya in Austria. The Taborites led by Mikuláš Sokol of Lamberka were returning from a marauding ride when they were defeated by Imperial Austrian forces.
