= Matěj Vůdce =

Czech gang leader (died 1409)

- Born: 14th century
- Died: 1409; České Budějovice, Bohemia

Matěj Vůdce (lit. 'Matěj the Leader'; died 1409) was a Czech bandit who was raiding caravans of the Rosenberg family in the early 15th century. He operated in the South Bohemian Region.

Matěj himself was likely an impoverished zeman, or part of the lower nobility. According to the acta negra maleficorum of Jihlava, he led a large group, which included famous military leader Jan Žižka. They subsisted on road robberies and raids.

== Gang activity ==
Matěj's gang activities were recorded by the Rosenberg family. It is likely he was supported by nobles who sided with Wenceslaus IV of Bohemia against the League of Lords, such as Jan Sokol of Lamberk.

Although mainly focused on theft, Matěj also attempted to occupy some castles in South Bohemia. This included an attempt to acquire Castle Hus, administered at the time by Mikuláš of Hus. There were also plans to seize Nové Hrady Castle. With help from the Bítov family of Lichtenburk, Matěj further attempted to take the Rosenberg held castle of Velešín near Českého Krumlova, but failed.

In 1407, Henry III of Rosenberg began to crack down on the banditry. Some members began to leave the group, including Žižka. Many members were captured, tried, and executed. Under torture, Matěj himself confessed to several robberies. In response to these crimes, Matěj was hanged in 1409 at České Budějovice.
