= Brodilovo =

Village in Bulgaria

Brodilovo (Bulgarian: Бродилово, Greek: Πρόδιβο) is a remote village in the Strandzha (Strandja) mountains of southeastern Bulgaria, within the range of the national park preserve, and part of Tsarevo Municipality, Burgas Province. Lying on the left bank of the Veleka, as of 2005 it has a population of 363 and the mayor is Dimitar Dimitrov. Brodilovo is in a fertile valley ringed by mountains, located at 42°5′N 27°51′E, 56 metres above sea level, close to the sea, but 12 km south of the port of Tsarevo. The name of the village is derived from its location near a convenient river ford (Bulgarian: брод, brod). Historically a centre of Thracian folklore and artisans, there are many unexcavated sites close by, though there is no mapping of the numerous trails and watercourses, partly because of it being in a sensitive border area with Turkey.

Older forms of the name are attested as Beradiu, Brodivo, Pordrikoz; it was first mentioned in 1498 with relation to salt trade, and had Christian 34 households at the time. Until 12 July 1914 the village was inhabited by Greek nestinari, but following the Second Balkan War these moved out to be replaced by Bulgarian refugees from Eastern Thrace. The village's Eastern Orthodox Church of Saint Pantaleon was built in 1910 and features an external narthex; the iconostasis was manufactured and carved by a local carver called Giannis.

The village is known for the practice of dog spinning, a pagan ritual that historically was thought to prevent disease. Although officially banned in 2006 following criticism by animal welfare organizations, the practice persists despite continued controversy. However fire dancing and other Thracian customs including animal costumed funeral rites are still practiced. Folk singing with ancient roots also survives. As of 2014 the primary local transport is still overwhelmingly equine, with silent streets where children can play. The village hosts a summer vacation hostel for young schoolchildren. Local services include 2 restaurant bars, and a community shop, which includes local produce. A minibus provides twice daily connection with the port of Tsarevo. Being one of very few villages in close proximity to the coast with an outstandingly beautiful valley, it has recently been discovered by the outside world and some of the older Greek houses have undergone preservation by a few foreign owners. Partly favoured for its gentle micro climate, incredibly long summers and close proximity to the rugged black sea coast and unspoilt coves and beaches. The village represents a unique time capsule of rural life and skills, and benefits from the surrounding oak forested Strandzha Nature Park.
