= Lozenets, Burgas Province =

Village in Tsarevo municipality, Bulgaria

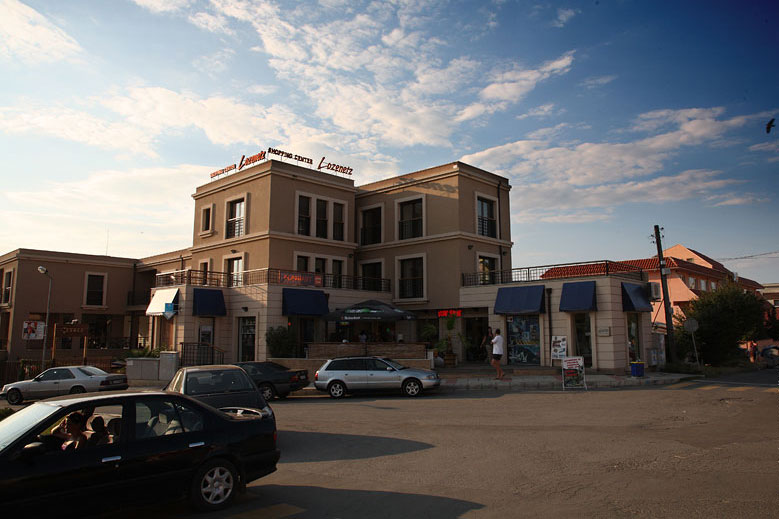
Lozenets, Burgas Province

Lozenets (Bulgarian: Лозенец; also Lozenec, Lozenetz) is a village and seaside resort on the southern Bulgarian Black Sea Coast. It is part of Tsarevo Municipality, Burgas Province, and lies at 42°13′N 27°48′E. As of February 2011, it has a population of 560. The population estimate for 2019 is 578.

== History ==
Lozenets was founded in 1924 by around 20 Bulgarian refugee families, originally from Eastern Thrace (mostly Peneka (Kömürköy) and Malak Samokov (Demirköy) who were initially put up in Poturnak (Velika), but moved to the seaside in search of better conditions. They settled in the Embelets or Ambelia area, where, according to the tradition, the old vineyards of Tsarevo (or even its oldest incarnation) used to be located. The first settlers lived by agriculture, stock breeding and woodcutting, with some later mastering sea fishing.

Beginning in the 1960s, nationwide and international sea tourism have radically changed the appearance of Lozenets and the occupation of the locals. Today, the village is a bustling tourist centre.

== Politics ==
From 2011 until 2017 the mayor of Lozenets was Mrs. Maria Vasileva. Since August 2016, the acting mayor of Lozenets is Mrs. Zhenya Gandieva.

== Economy ==
There is a villa zone to the south of the village. Several famous Bulgarians have built villas there. They include the actresses Anya Pencheva and Aneta Sotirova, the singer Beloslava, and members of parliament Zheni Zhivokova and Nikolay Nikolov.

Oasis beach in southern portion of Lozenets is lined with several high-end hotels and is near a villa zone.
