= Breznik =

Breznik Брезник
- Town
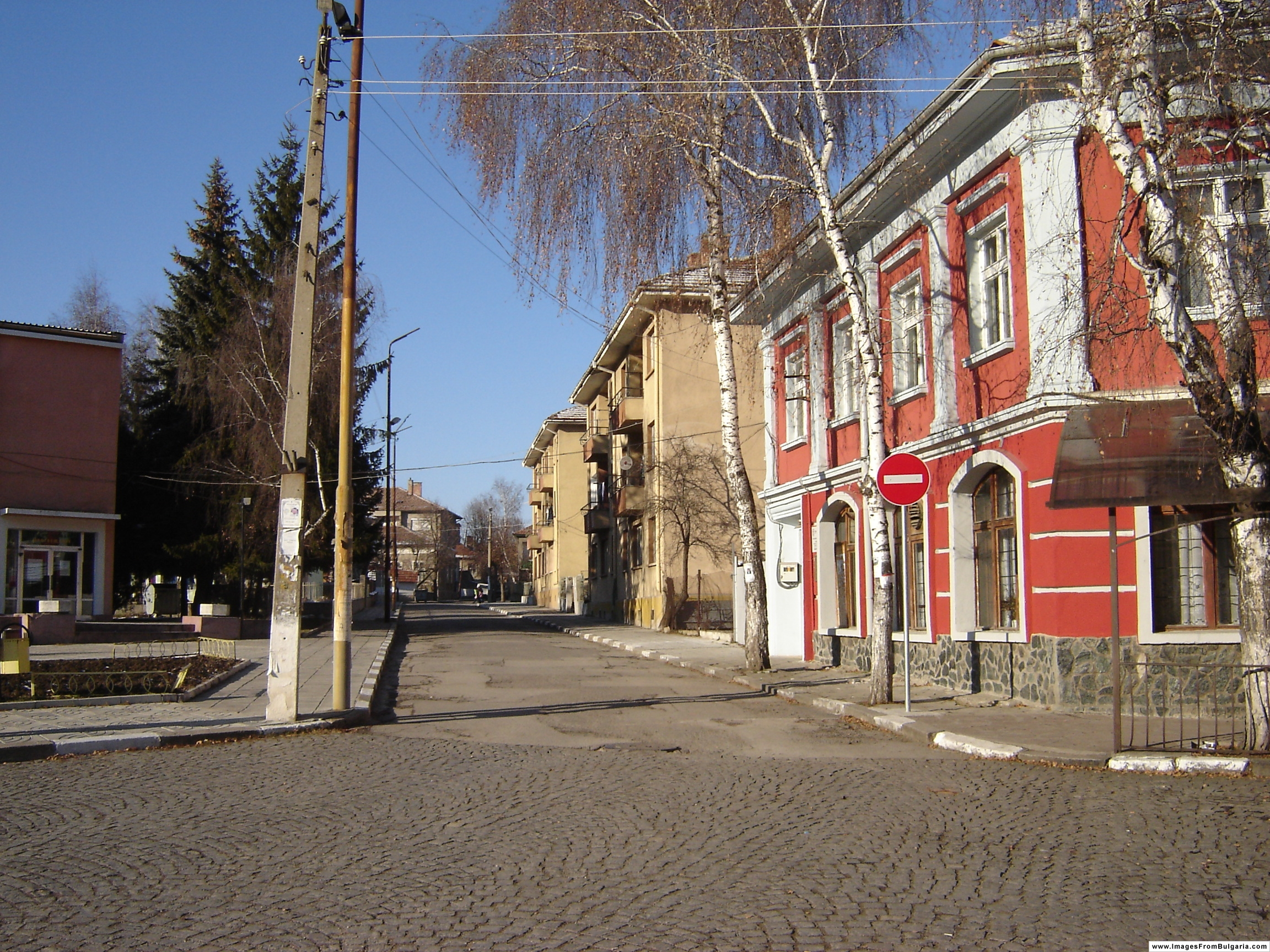
- View from Breznik

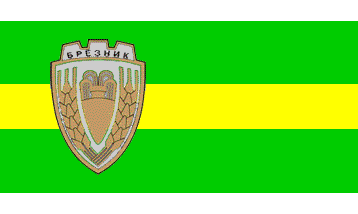
- Flag

- Location of Breznik
- Coordinates: 42°44′27″N 22°54′24″E
- Country: Bulgaria
- Provinces (Oblast): Pernik
- First mentioned: XI Century

Government
  - Mayor: Vasil Uzunov
- Elevation: 756 m (2,480 ft)

Population (2020)
  - Total: 3,987
- Time zone: UTC+2 (EET)
  - Summer (DST): UTC+3 (EEST)
- Postal Code: 2360
- Area code: 07751

Breznik (Bulgarian: Брезник [ˈbrɛznik]) is a town in western Bulgaria, 50 km away from Sofia. It is located in Pernik Province and is close to the towns of Bankya and Pernik. Villages in the municipality include Begunovtsi, Dushintsi, and Velkovtsi.

== Etymology ==
Its name is derived from the Bulgarian word breznik, referring to a birch forest, from the word for birch, бреза (breza). It is cognate to the Czech placename Březník.

== Geography ==
The town is located in the historical-geographical and ethnographic region of Graovo. Breznik is the center of its northwestern end (Gorno Graovo), and Pernik of the southeastern (Dolno Graovo). The border between the two parts of Graovo is along the lines of the villages of Selishten dol, Palilula, Velkovtsi and Viskjar. The climate is humid-continental (Dfb).

== History ==
Breznik was first mentioned in the 11th-century Story of Isaiah and Bulgarian Apocryphal Chronicle as БР(Ѣ)ЗНИКЪ; it was already a city by then. The town was mentioned throughout the 15th-19th centuries, attesting its continuous existence.

Breznik has played a proper role in the life of the Bulgarian state. We have inherited medieval cultural monuments. Of particular importance are the medieval church "St. Petka", the Revival class school, the megalithic temple-well "Empty Throat", the Chernogorski and Bilin monasteries, the remains of ancient churches, the old houses of architectural and artistic value as the twin house in the village of Kosharevo; the veranda houses in the village of Razhavets, etc. In almost all settlements in the municipality there are churches from the era of the Bulgarian Revival.

In the 17th - 18th century Breznik was an attractive center for leading painters and builders. The local people were very active and managed to attract even the prominent representative of the Samokov school, Joan the Icon Painter. The educational work was also very well developed. There were cell schools in the Bilin Monastery, the Church of St. Petka and in some Breznik villages. In 1869 in the town of Breznik was founded the first Class School, in which Dimitar Tondjarov from Samokov taught. On his initiative, a community center was opened in the city. At the time before the Liberation there were about 200 Bulgarian and 30-40 Turkish houses, and then the Turkish population emigrated from the city and from all villages in the surrounding area.

Significant changes took place in the Breznik region in the period from the Liberation to the middle of the 20th century in socio-economic and demographic terms. At this time there was a turning point in the life of the population and in the appearance of the settlements. This is how industry emerged in the town of Breznik. Industrialization, in turn, leads to significant structural changes in the city and in the villages. The mechanization of agricultural production also has a positive impact in this respect.

== Economy ==
- Tailoring workshop
- Panel production workshop for the French industry
- A confectionery workshop

== Notable people ==
- Borislava Radoeva, journalist
- Georgi Ljubenov, professor jurist
- Dimitar Georgiev, revolutionary
- Berlin Andreev, professor
- Tsvetana Tabakova (1905 – 1936), opera singer
- Krum Savov (1960 –), journalist
- Liliana Bareva (1922 – 2007), opera singer
- Margarita Hranova (1951 –), singer
- Slavcho Pirchev (1886 – 1973), officer
- Svetoslav Gotsev (1990 –), volleyball player

== Honour ==
Breznik Heights on Greenwich Island in the South Shetland Islands, Antarctica is named after Breznik.

== Gallery ==
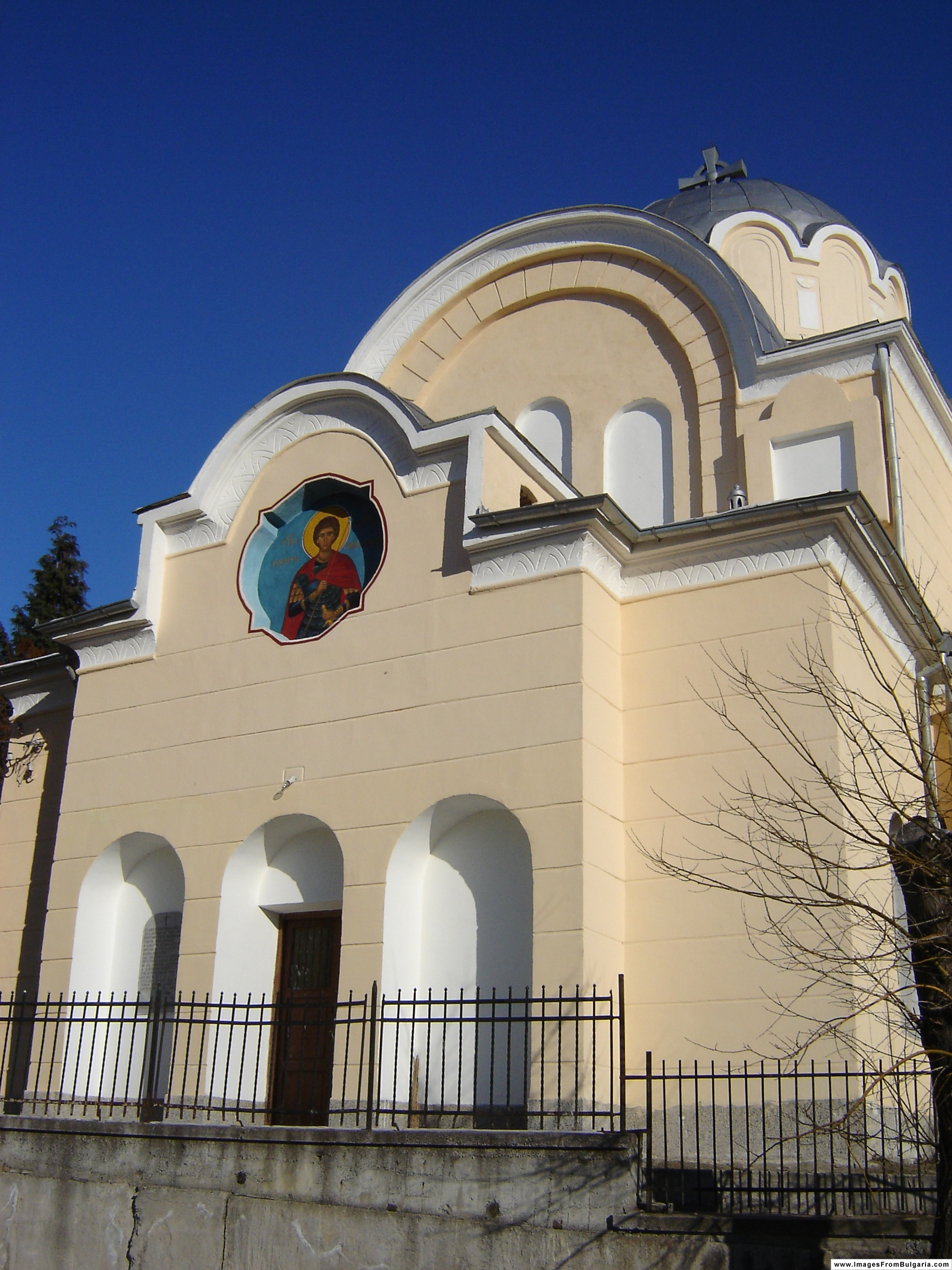
St. Nikola Church

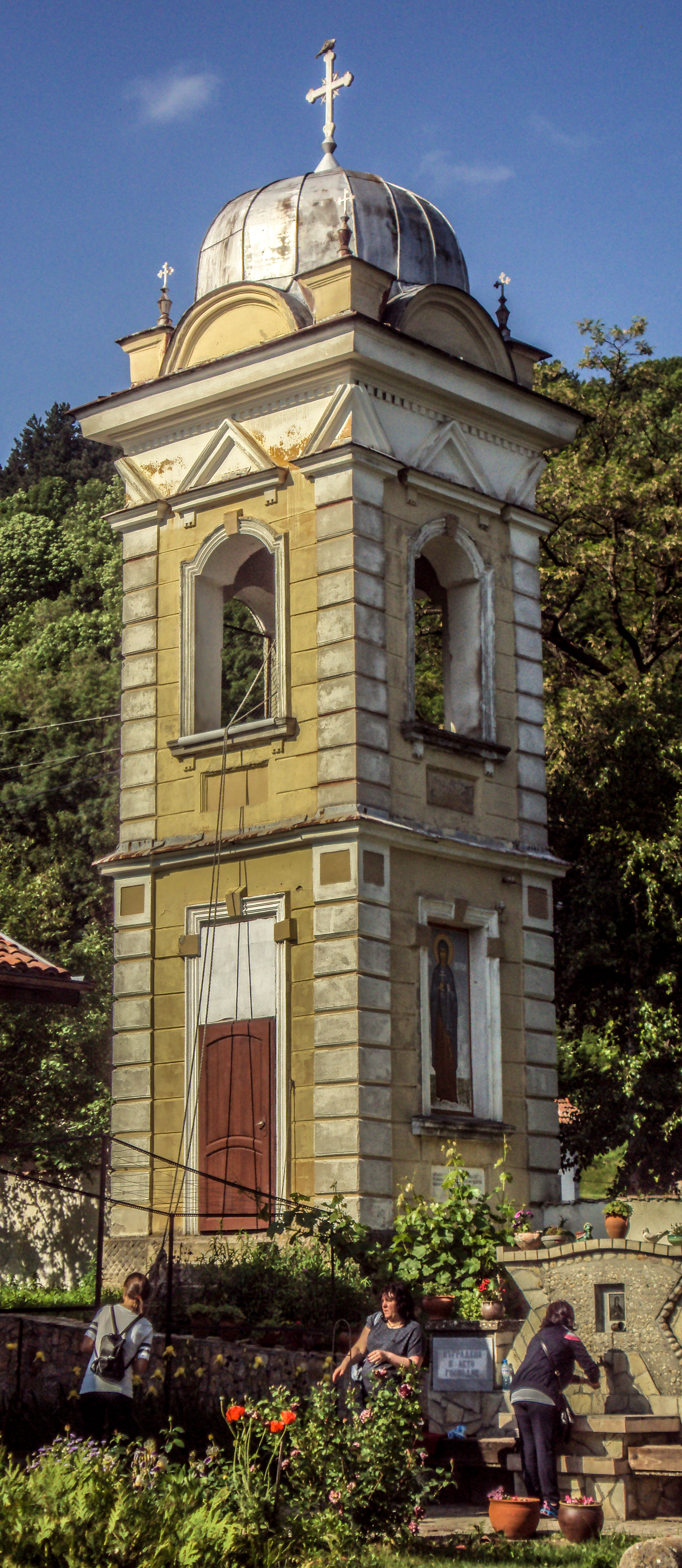
St. Petka Church

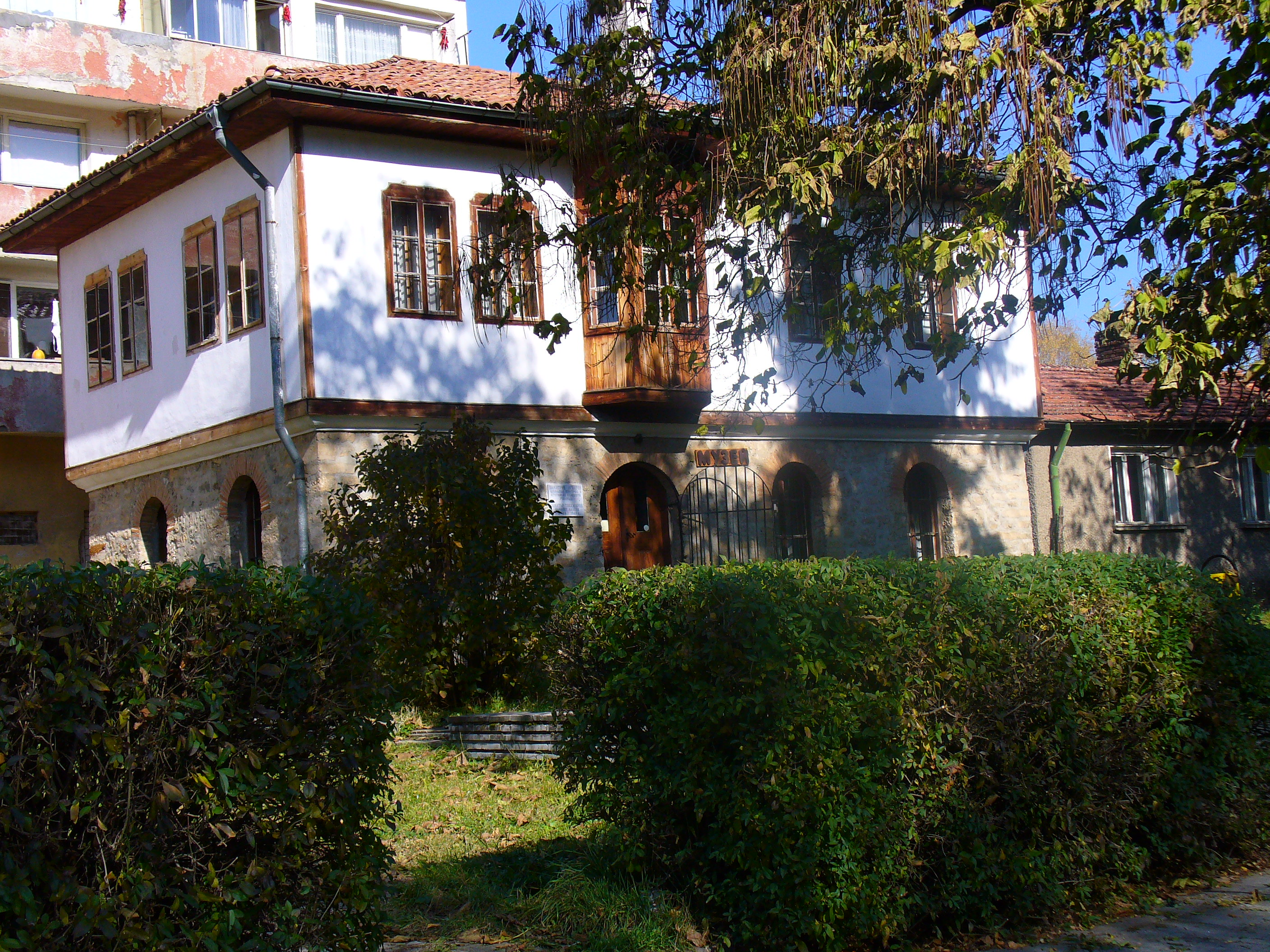
Museum
