= Begunovtsi =

Begunovtsi Бегуновци
- Village
- Location of Begunovtsi
- Coordinates: 42°41′33″N 22°49′57″E
- Country: Bulgaria
- Province (Oblast): Pernik
- Municipality (Obshtina): Breznik
- First establishment: 1560

Government
  - Mayor: Vasil Uzunov

Area
  - Land: 10.587 km^{2} (4.088 sq mi)
- Elevation: 724 m (2,375 ft)

Population (2020)
  - Total: 128
- Time zone: UTC+2 (EET)
  - Summer (DST): UTC+3 (EEST)
- Postal Code: 2395
- License plate: PK

Begunovtsi (Bulgarian: Бегуновци, also transliterated Begunovci) is a village in western Bulgaria. Its located in Oblast Pernik, Obshtina Breznik.

== Geography ==
The village of Begunovtsi is located in a mountainous area. The river Razhditsa passes through the village. There is also a fountain with spring water. The dam of the village of Begunovtsi allows the development of sport fishing and also to irrigate the agricultural land. The village is close to the towns of Pernik and Breznik, and a little further from Sofia.

== History ==
The settlement was recorded as a village and as "Begunofça" in the Ottoman Tahrir Defter number 409 during the reign of Süleyman the Magnificent. Moreover, in the Maliyeden Müdevver number 81 from 1523 the village had Voynuk households under the Voynugan-ı Istabl-ı Amire military branch, which were Ottoman Christian Soldiers and were tax-exempt. At the outbreak of the Balkan War, two people from Begunovtsi were volunteers in the Macedonian-Adrianopolitan outbreak.

== Cultural and nature landmarks ==
Izvora – In the village of Begunovtsi there is spring water (the so-called Old Fountain). The old fountain was built in 1921 and still exists today. According to Laserman Assenov Minev, the presence of this water is the reason for the Begunovtsi refugees who fled from the Turks to settle in this area near the spring. Laserman believes that the Begunovtsi people lived before in the village of Nepraznentsi and robbed the Turkish treasury there. This robbery really happened. Laserman says that a man of his kind, the shepherd Miter, discovered years later the wealth buried by a robbery of the Turkish treasury. The Turks killed many of the Begunovtsi for revenge, but some of them managed to escape and years later settled at the source of the Old Fountain and the people from the surrounding villages recognized them and called the village Begnovtsi (later the Russians called it Begunovtsi).

Cherkvata – The old church of the village of Begunovtsi has an architectural plan. The iconostasis dates from the beginning of the 17th century and can be connected with the school of St. Pimen Zografski. In the summer of 2009, a major renovation of the church and the bell tower in the village began. The bell tower was built by master Asen Minev Paunkov.

Old houses – There are various old houses in the village. You can see even the most primitive so-called braids, but they are in poor condition and are likely to be destroyed for safety reasons. But in the village, there are three old and houses of rich runners from the past. These are:

- Grandpa Anto's Durman house was built by thorns, masons, stone masonry and in extremely good condition to this day.
- The peacock house of Asen Minev Stefanov-Paunkov was built by a famous master builder of the village Asen Minev Paunkov and preserved through reconstruction to this day. It is located right in the center of the village.
- Grandpa Alexi's Durman house is also a very old and nice house, preserved to this day. The two Durmandini houses are next to each other.

Others – The village has a stadium, which is of amateur size – 70/40 – and a football club, Zapadno eho.

== Notable people ==
- Damjan Begunov (b. 1929) – humorist, journalist, sculptor. Awarded, "honorary citizen of Pernik" on 19 October 2004.
- Stamen Mihajlov – archeologist
- Dr. Licho Velichkov – doctor-roentgenologist
- Petko Damjanov – poet, writer, historian
- Laserman Asenov – artist, author of the book, "Paunkov's kin"
- Nikola Cakmanov – history teacher, awarded, "honorary citizen of Pernik"
- Georgi Antov – Macedonian-Adrianopolitan volunteer, bronze medal
- Dimitar Stojanov – priest in Breznik, bookbinder
- Dr. Konstantin Takev – jurist and writer
