= Kosti, Burgas Province =

Village in southeastern Bulgaria, Burgas province

Coordinates: 42°04′N 27°47′E

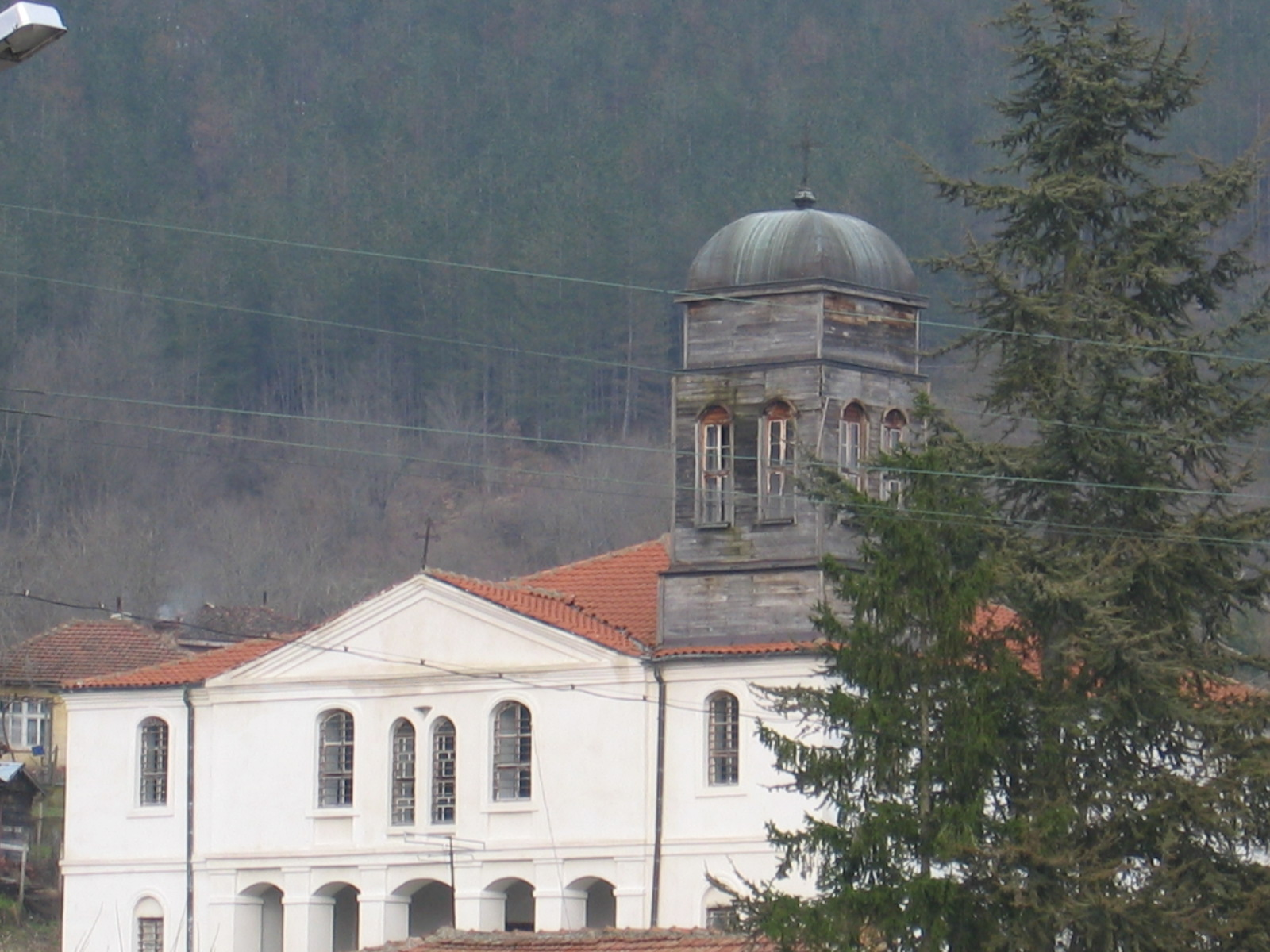
The church in Kosti (1909)

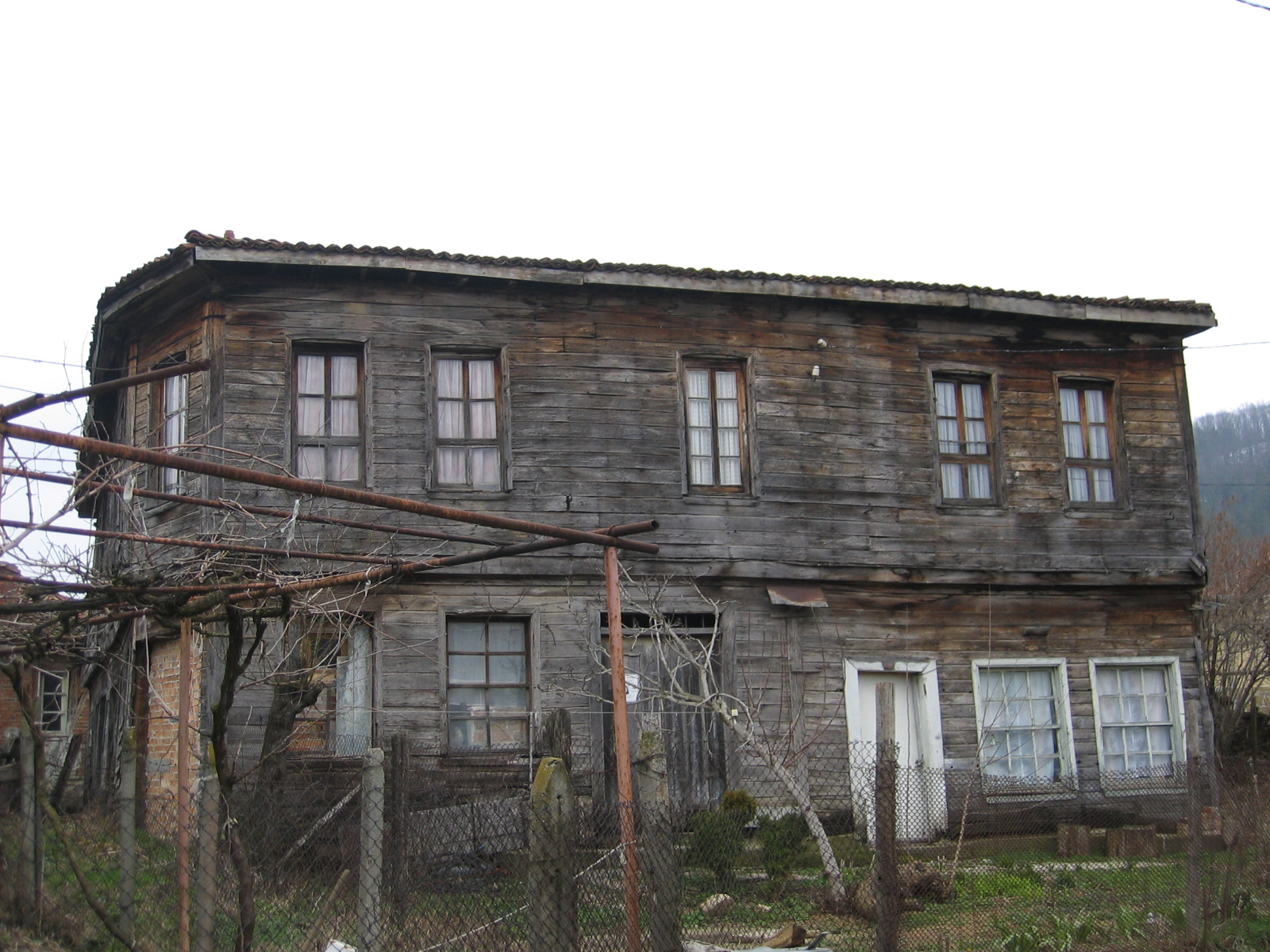
Old wooden house in Kosti

Kosti (Bulgarian: Кости [kosˈti], Greek: Κωστί, Kosti) is a village in southeastern Bulgaria, part of Tsarevo Municipality, Burgas Province. It is located on the banks of the Veleka River in the Strandzha mountains not far from the Turkish border, 20-25 kilometres south of Tsarevo and 91 km southeast of Burgas. As of June 2008, it has a population of 320. The village lies within Strandzha Nature Park.

Traces of ancient metallurgical activity have been discovered in the vicinity of Kosti, as well as a big necropolis and several independent mounds of Thracian origin. The modern village was first mentioned in an Ottoman tax register of 1498, according to which Kosti's population consisted of 22 Christian families. It also featured in a 17th-century tax register, and during the Russo-Turkish War of 1828-1829 it was described as a Greek village (see Greeks in Bulgaria). Statistics of 1898 count 185 Greek and 25 Bulgarian houses, whereas 1897 data only notes 300 Greek houses.

Kosti was one of the Greek villages of inland Strandzha, culturally and linguistically very distant from then-Greek-inhabited nearby coastal towns like Tsarevo (Vassiliko) and Ahtopol. The local houses differ significantly from the typical village houses of Strandzha and the town houses of the coast. The houses in Kosti typically have two stories of crude stone, with the top floor cased with thick oak boards. They feature an unusually large fireplace on the top floor and the reported lack of any windows (which were later added by the Bulgarians who settled), as the only light to enter the room would come from a small opening in the ceiling called okno. The population was mainly engaged in agriculture, cattle breeding and logging (wood was in demand by the Ahtopol shipyard).

Historical population
Year	Population
1926	1,328
1934	1,295
1946	1,403
1956	1,681
1965	1,310
1975	930
1985	700
1992	644
2008	320

Kosti is a characteristic nestinari village, with a hundred of the 400 families being hereditary practitioners of this custom. Besides the old village Eastern Orthodox church, the village had another ritual building housing the eight nestinari icons, including the main icon, that of feast and regional patron Saint Constantine.

Following the Balkan Wars, the village was ceded to Bulgaria by the Ottoman Empire, and the local Greeks moved to Greece, particularly Greek Macedonia and the villages of Meliki, Verie, Kerkini, Strymoniko, Agia Eleni (Serres regional unit), Mavrolevki (Drama regional unit), Langadas (Thessaloniki regional unit). After 1914, the deserted village was settled by Bulgarian refugees from Turkish-ruled Eastern Thrace, particularly from Pirgoplo (100 families) and the town of Malak Samokov (Demirköy; 60 families). The new settlers were also deeply engaged in logging, wood and charcoal production. A new church (at the place of the old church damaged in the Ilinden-Preobrazhenie Uprising) of Saints Cyril and Methodius was built in 1909, as were a school and a community centre (chitalishte) in 1925. The church features an imposing iconostasis by the woodcarver Pandil, as well as old icons, such as two from 1883 and 1901 by the painter Kosta Polixoido.

In January 2011 a foot-and-mouth disease outbreak was registered in the village of Kosti.
