= Kondolovo =

Kondolovo Кондолово
- Village
- Location within Bulgaria
- Coordinates: 42°06′N 27°41′E
- Country: Bulgaria
- Province: Burgas Province
- Municipality: Tsarevo Municipality
- Time zone: UTC+2 (EET)
  - Summer (DST): UTC+3 (EEST)

Kondolovo (Bulgarian: Кондолово) is a village in Tsarevo Municipality, in Burgas Province, in southeastern Bulgaria.

Kondolovo is situated in Strandzha Mountain and lies within the territory of Strandzha Nature Park. It is one of the few villages with preserved Strandzha's typical architecture of the late 19th - early 20th century. It is situated on the northern watershed of the river Veleka, on the road Tsarevo - Gramatikovo - Malko Tarnovo, at 24 km from Tsarevo.
