= Dushintsi =

Village in West Bulgaria, Pernik district, Bulgaria

Dushintsi Душинци
- Location of Dushintsi
- Coordinates: 42°42′29″N 22°40′14″E
- Country: Bulgaria
- Provinces (Oblast): Pernik

Government
  - Mayor: Hristo Milenkov
- Elevation: 985 m (3,232 ft)

Population (2005)
  - Total: 30
- Time zone: UTC+2 (EET)
  - Summer (DST): UTC+3 (EEST)
- Postal Code: 2398
- License plate: B

Dushintsi (Bulgarian: Душинци) is a village in western Bulgaria in the municipality of Breznik, Pernik district. The village is situated in a mountainous region, nestled in the northeast mountainside of Golemi Vrah. It had not been mentioned in any registers until the Liberation of Bulgaria in 1878.

== Name ==
Its name is derived from the personal name Dusha, a version of Dusho.
