= Fazanovo =

- Village
- Location within Bulgaria
- Coordinates: 42°10′N 27°42′E
- Country: Bulgaria
- Province: Burgas Province
- Municipality: Tsarevo Municipality
- Time zone: UTC+2 (EET)
  - Summer (DST): UTC+3 (EEST)

Fazanovo (Bulgarian: Фазаново) is a village in Tsarevo Municipality, in Burgas Province, in southeastern Bulgaria.

Located in the Strandzha Mountain Range, Fazanovo is a small village surrounded by large forests. Founded 90 years ago Fazanovo, has grown to a cultural center in the mountains with many artists, musicians, and actors residing throughout the year or visiting over the winter and summer holidays.

The yearly Fazanovo Fair takes place on the weekend following Saint Marina day. Also, there is a Film and Art Festival (F.A.R.T. Fest) on a different date each year, following the Fazanovo Fair. During the winter the village of Fazanovo has approximately 15-30 permanent residents.
