= Tsarevo Municipality =

Coordinates: 42.2699°N 27.7466°E

Tsarevo Municipality Община Царево
- Municipality (Obshtina)
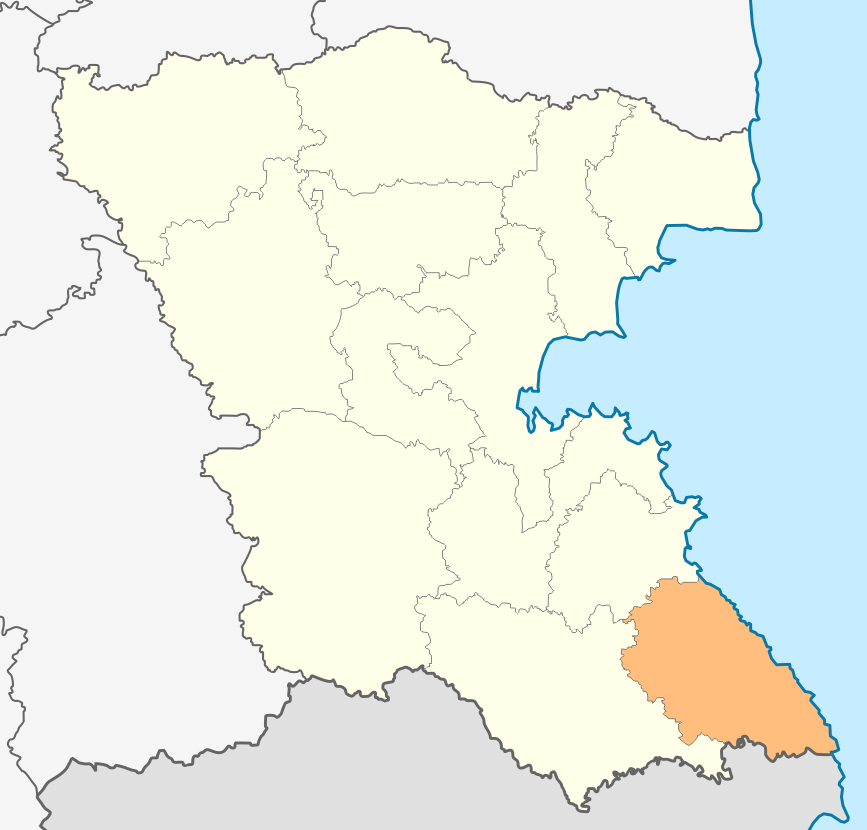
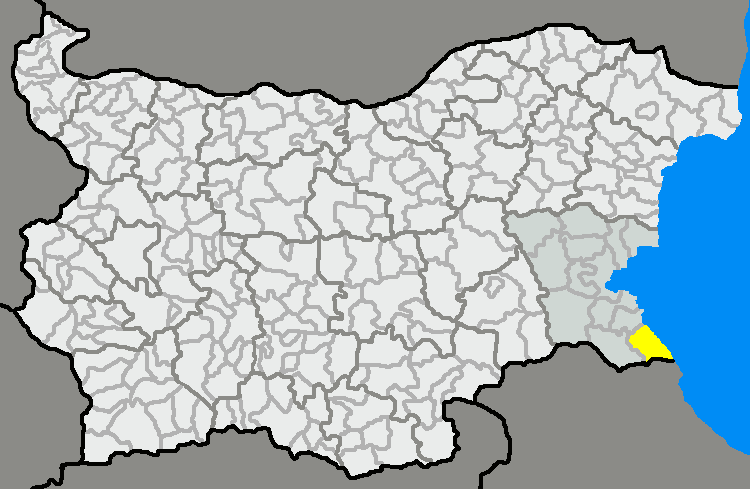
- Location in Burgas province Location on map of Bulgaria
- Country: Bulgaria
- Province (Oblast): Burgas
- Seat: Tsarevo

Area
  - Total: 513.4 km^{2} (198.2 sq mi)

Population (2021)
  - Total: 17,812
  - Density: 34.69/km^{2} (89.86/sq mi)
- Time zone: UTC+2 (EET)
  - Summer (DST): UTC+3 (EEST)
- Website: tsarevo.bg

Tsarevo Municipality (Bulgarian: Община Царево, Obshtina Tsarevo) is a municipality in Burgas Province, Bulgaria.

== Demographics ==
=== Religion ===
According to the latest Bulgarian census of 2011, the religious composition, among those who answered the optional question on religious identification, was the following:

Religious composition of Tsarevo Municipality
Orthodox Christianity	90.5%
Catholicism	0.6%
Protestantism	1.3%
Islam	0.0%
No religion	3.1%
Prefer not to answer, others and indefinable	4.5%

== Subdivision ==
In the municipality enter 13 localities:

- Ahtopol
- Balgari
- Brodilovo
- Fazanovo
- Izgrev
- Kondolovo
- Kosti
- Lozenets
- Rezovo
- Sinemorets
- Tsarevo
- Varvara
- Velika
