= Velika, Bulgaria =

Velika Велика
- Village
- Location within Bulgaria
- Coordinates: 42°11′N 27°47′E
- Country: Bulgaria
- Province: Burgas Province
- Municipality: Tsarevo Municipality

Area
  - Total: 26.223 km^{2} (10.125 sq mi)

Population (2013)
  - Total: 96
- Time zone: UTC+2 (EET)
  - Summer (DST): UTC+3 (EEST)

Velika (Bulgarian: Велика) is a village in Tsarevo Municipality, in Burgas Province, in southeastern Bulgaria.
