= Březník =

- Municipality
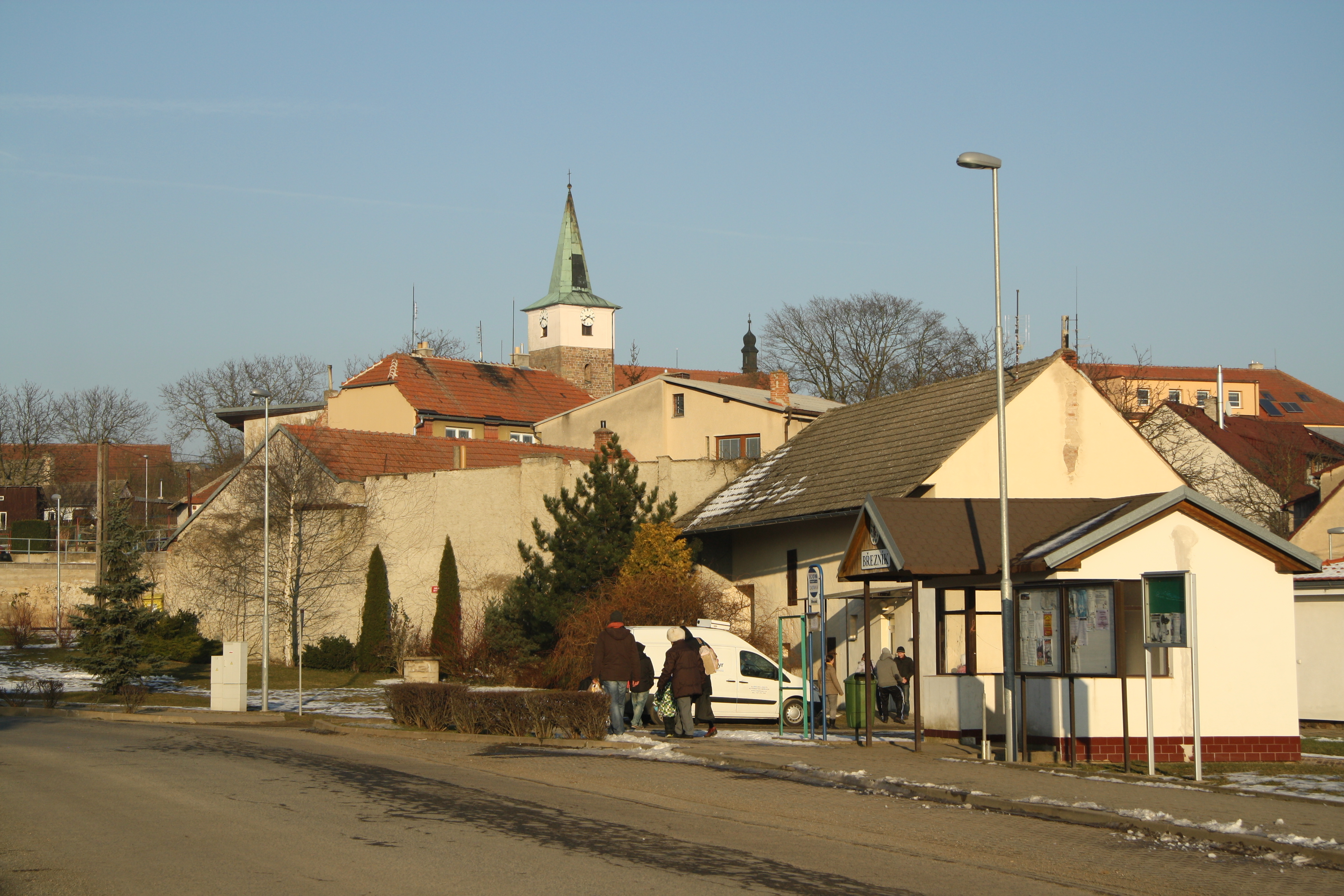
- Centre of Březník

- Flag Coat of arms

- Location in the Czech Republic
- Coordinates: 49°10′20″N 16°11′39″E
- Country: Czech Republic
- Region: Vysočina
- District: Třebíč
- First mentioned: 1237

Area
  - Total: 13.54 km^{2} (5.23 sq mi)
- Elevation: 370 m (1,210 ft)

Population (2026-01-01)
  - Total: 692
  - Density: 51.1/km^{2} (132/sq mi)
- Time zone: UTC+1 (CET)
  - Summer (DST): UTC+2 (CEST)
- Postal code: 675 74
- Website: www.obecbreznik.cz

Březník is a municipality and village in Třebíč District in the Vysočina Region of the Czech Republic. It has about 700 inhabitants.

Březník lies approximately 24 kilometres (15 mi) east of Třebíč, 51 km (32 mi) south-east of Jihlava, and 164 km (102 mi) south-east of Prague.

== Demographics ==
Historical population
Year	Pop.	±%
1869	661	—
1880	715	+8.2%
1890	770	+7.7%
1900	791	+2.7%
1910	777	−1.8%
1921	855	+10.0%
1930	934	+9.2%
1950	902	−3.4%
1961	887	−1.7%
1970	842	−5.1%
1980	782	−7.1%
1991	697	−10.9%
2001	652	−6.5%
2011	651	−0.2%
2021	685	+5.2%
Source: Censuses
