= Gramatikovo =

Gramatikovo Граматиково
- Village
- Location within Bulgaria
- Coordinates: 42°04′N 27°39′E
- Country: Bulgaria
- Province: Burgas Province
- Municipality: Malko Tarnovo Municipality
- Time zone: UTC+2 (EET)
  - Summer (DST): UTC+3 (EEST)

Gramatikovo (Bulgarian: Граматиково) is a village in Malko Tarnovo Municipality, in Burgas Province, in southeastern Bulgaria. It is situated in Strandzha Nature Park.

On 31 January 2011 a foot-and-mouth disease outbreak was discovered in the village of Gramatikovo.
