= Tsarevo =

Tsarevo Царево
- Town
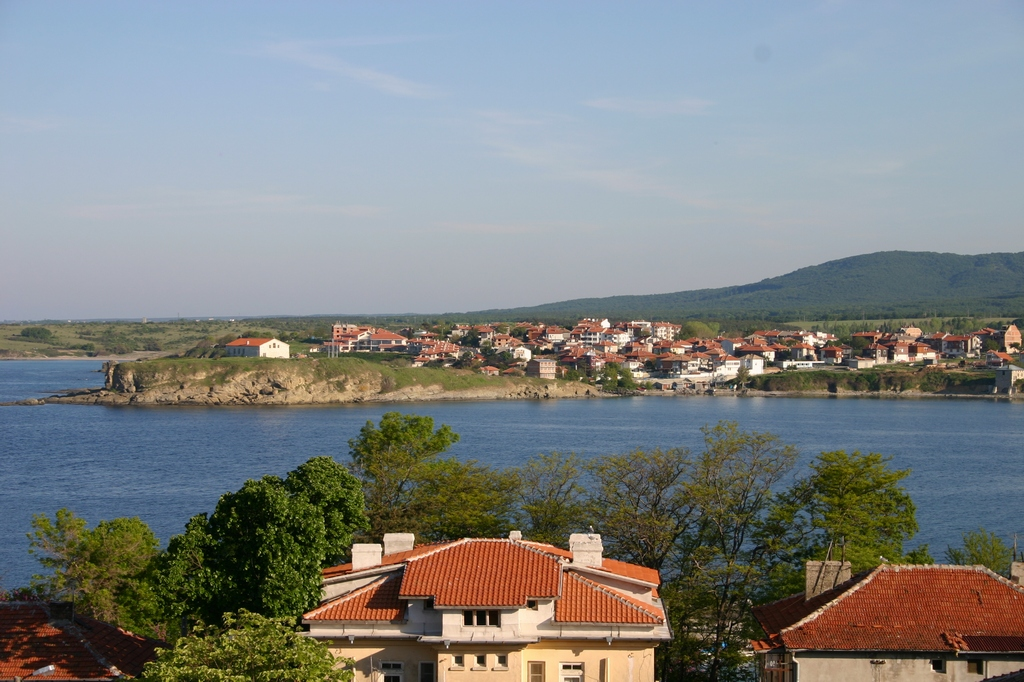

- Location of Tsarevo
- Coordinates: 42°10′15″N 27°51′4″E
- Country: Bulgaria
- Provinces: Burgas
- Municipality: Tsarevo

Government
  - Mayor: Marin Kirov (GERB)

Area
  - Total: 35.179 km^{2} (13.583 sq mi)
- Elevation: 0 m (0 ft)

Population (2019)
  - Total: 7,000
  - Density: 200/km^{2} (520/sq mi)
- Time zone: UTC+2 (EET)
  - Summer (DST): UTC+3 (EEST)
- Postal Code: 8260
- Area code: 0550
- Website: www.tzarevo.net

Tsarevo (Bulgarian: Царево, pronounced [ˈt͡sarɛvo], also transliterated as Carevo or Tzarevo) is a town and seaside resort in the Municipality of Tsarevo, Burgas Province, Bulgaria.

== Etymology ==
In the past, it was known as Vasiliko (Bulgarian: Василико, Greek: Βασιλικό), and between 1950 and 1991 it was known as Michurin (Bulgarian: Мичурин, Μιτσούριν), in honour of the Soviet botanist Ivan Vladimirovich Michurin.

== Geography ==
=== Location ===
It lies on a cove 70 km southeast of Burgas, on the southern Bulgarian Black Sea Coast at the eastern foot of Strandzha mountain, at a few kilometers from Strandzha Nature Park.

=== Climate ===
Tsarevo has a humid subtropical climate (Köppen climate classification: Cfa). Climate chart - link to Weather atlas:

== History ==
Underwater archaeological surveys have discovered amphoras from the Late Antiquity (4th–6th century) and imported red-polished pottery made in Constantinople, Syria and North Africa, which indicates prospering trade in the area at the time. The city's southern peninsula has remains of a medieval fortress.

The town was first mentioned as Vasiliko by the 12th-century Arab geographer Muhammad al-Idrisi. Whether it existed during the First Bulgarian Empire is unknown. In the 15th and 16th century, Vasilikoz was an Ottoman port. According to 17th-century traveller Evliya Çelebi, in 1662 the town Vasilikoz Burgas comprised a square fortress on a ridge overlooking the Black Sea surrounded by plenty of vineyards. Although its cove was suitable even for the largest of ships, it was usually avoided by the seamen because it offered little protection from the powerful eastern winds.

Vasilikoz was featured in the Ottoman tax registers in the late 17th and the 18th century, as part of the kaza of Anchialos (Pomorie). According to the Austrian ambassador in Constantinople, in 1787 it was a town of 200 houses and a lively port. In 1829, another western traveller mentioned Vasiliko as a town of 220 houses, the main occupation of its residents being ship building and fishing. Another source lists its population in 1831 as 1,800 (with 434 houses).

The old town was located in the southern part of the cove, where the modern quarter of Tsarevo called Vasiliko is. In the first half of the 19th century, Vasiliko had a marine of 42 ships. There were 10 windmills and a watermill in the vicinity, and the nearby vineyards produced up to 6,000 pails of wine a year. There was a Greek school which was also visited by many Bulgarians, contributing to their partial Hellenization.

In 1882, a fire destroyed almost the entire town, forcing the locals to re-establish the city on a new site, on the peninsula of the northern cove called Limnos. In 1903, the new Vasiliko had 150 houses, but other statistics list 460 houses in 1898 (160 Bulgarian and 300 Greek) and 240 Greek-only houses in 1900. Vassiliko was centre of Ahtabolu kaza in Kırkkilise sanjak of Edirne Vilayet between 1878 and 1912

After the village was ceded to Bulgaria in 1913, following the Balkan Wars, its Greek population moved to Greece and was replaced by Bulgarians from Eastern Thrace. In 1926, Vasiliko had 409 households. After a new wharf was constructed from 1927 to 1937 with the financial aid of Tsar Boris III of Bulgaria, the town was renamed to Tsarevo (a literal Bulgarian translation of Vasiliko, "royal place") in his honour.

== Gallery ==
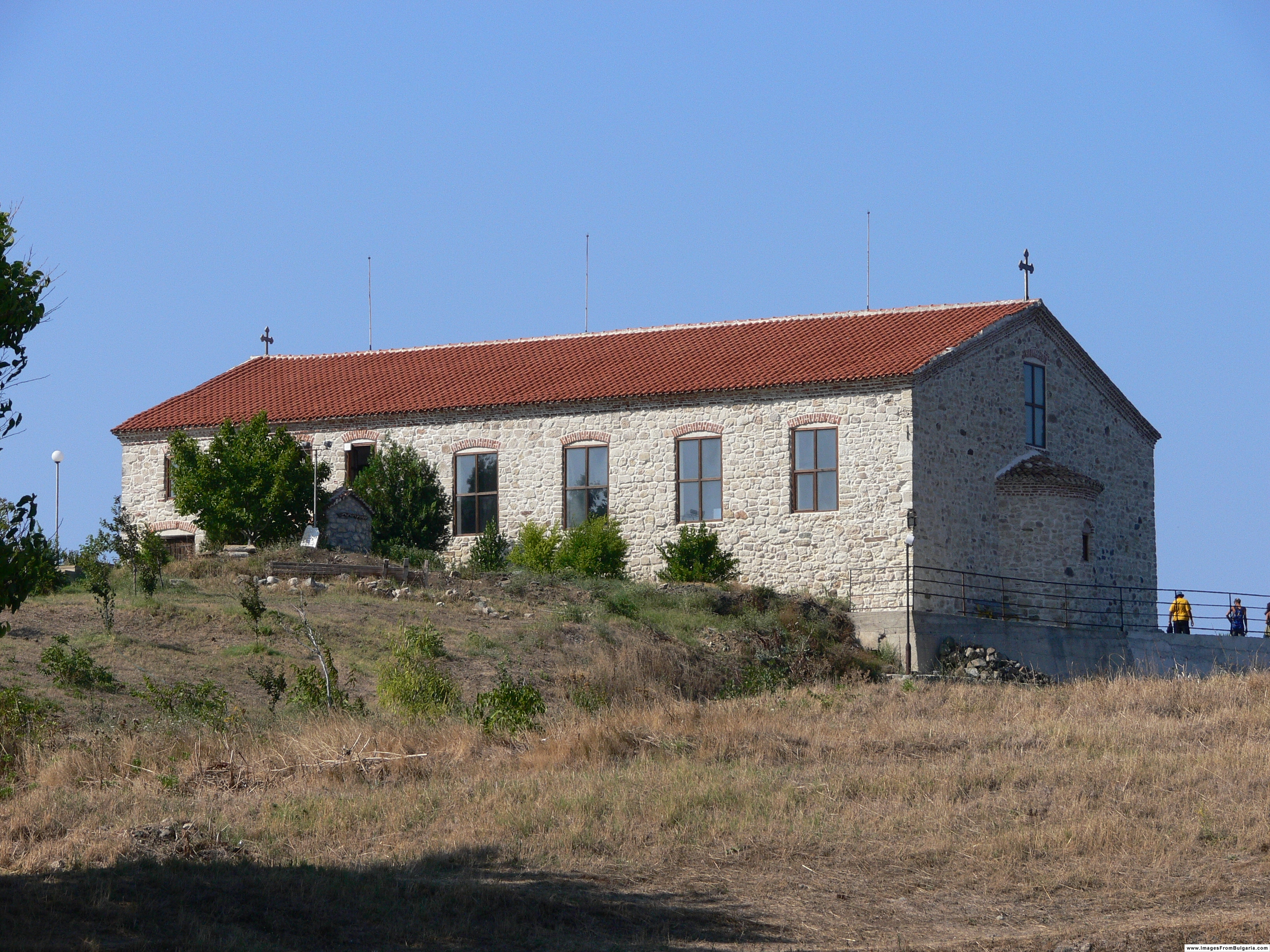
Church in the Vasiliko quarter of Tsarevo

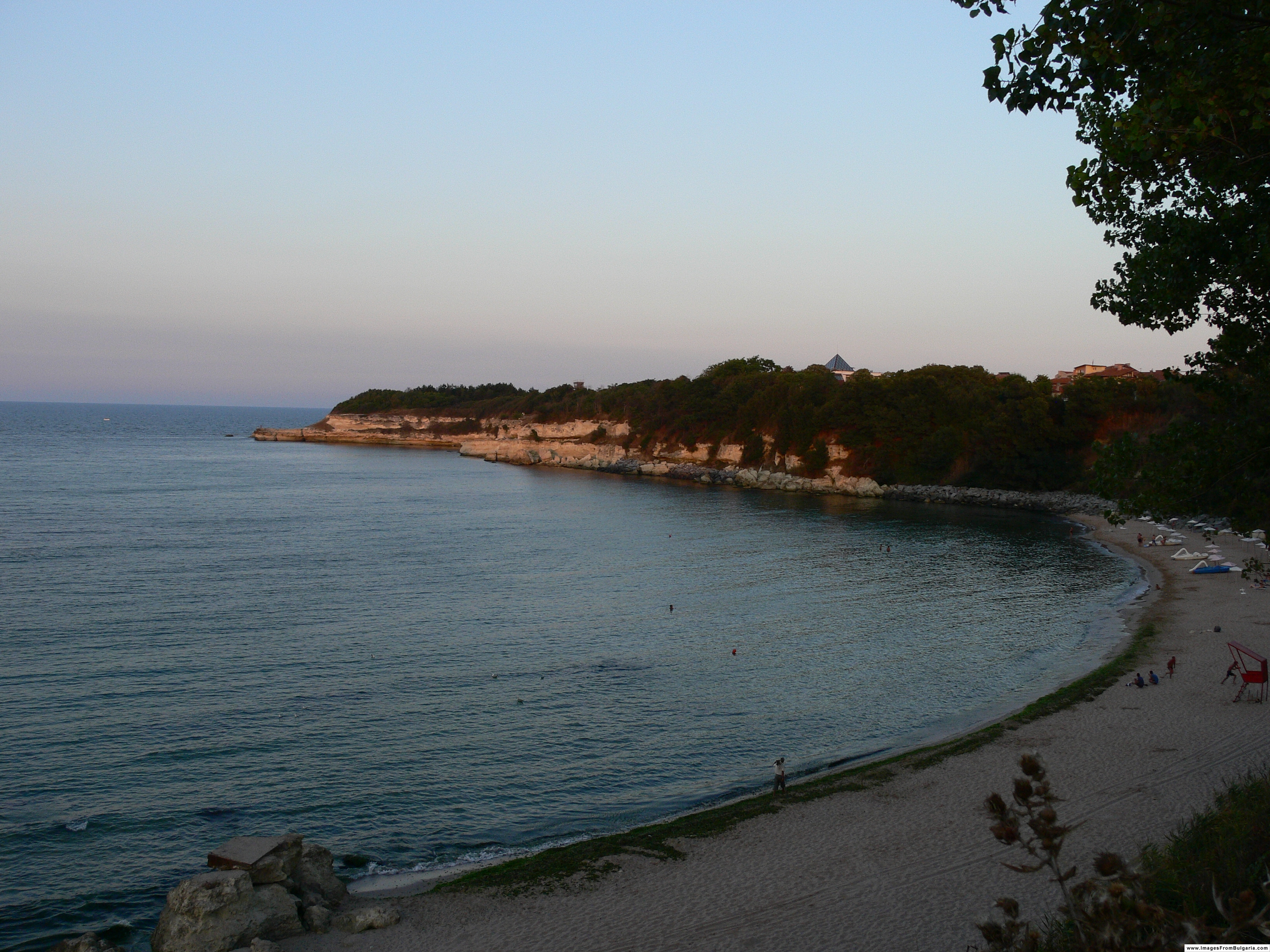
The Black Sea at Tsarevo

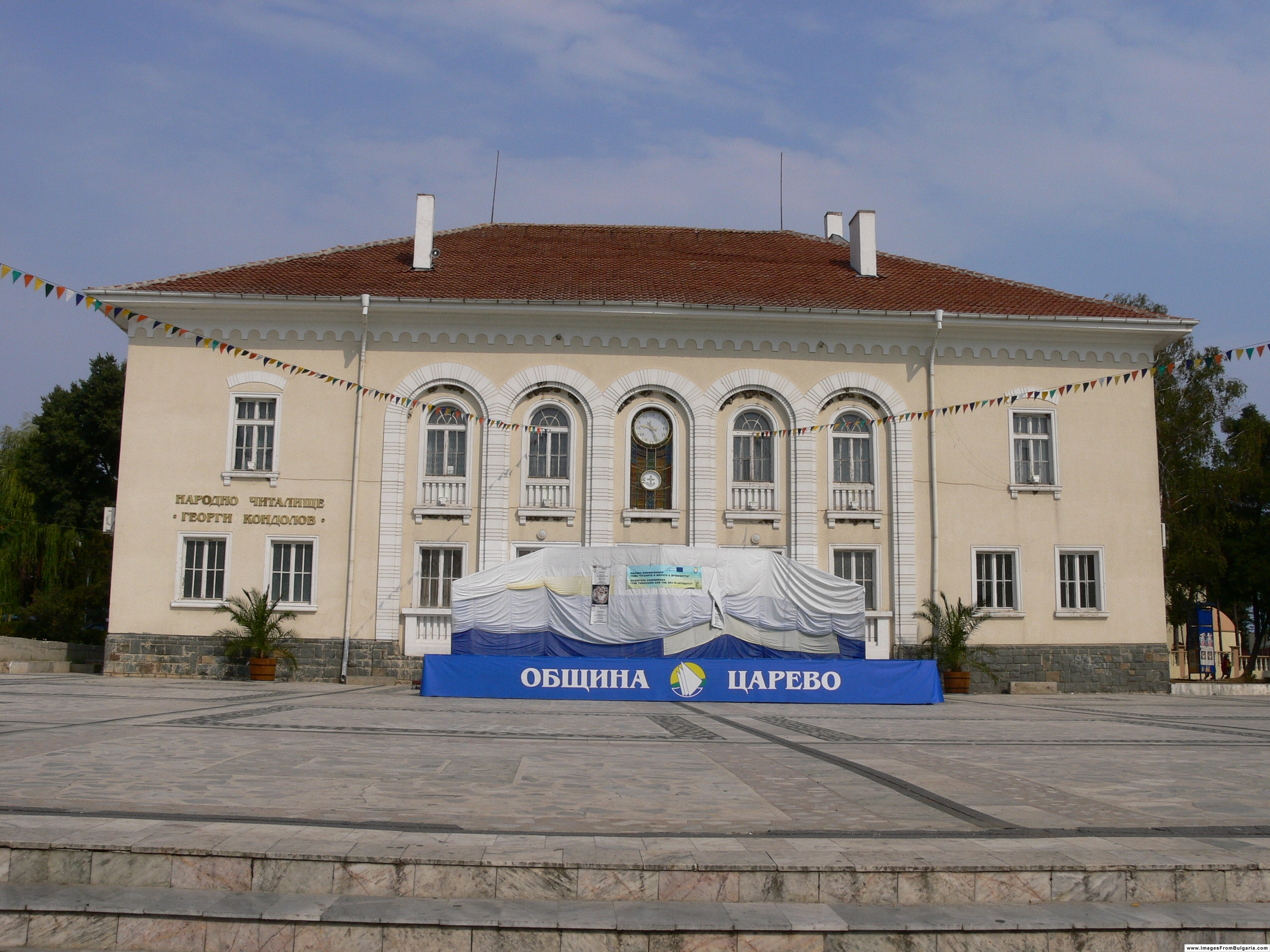
The Georgi Kondolov community centre (chitalishte)

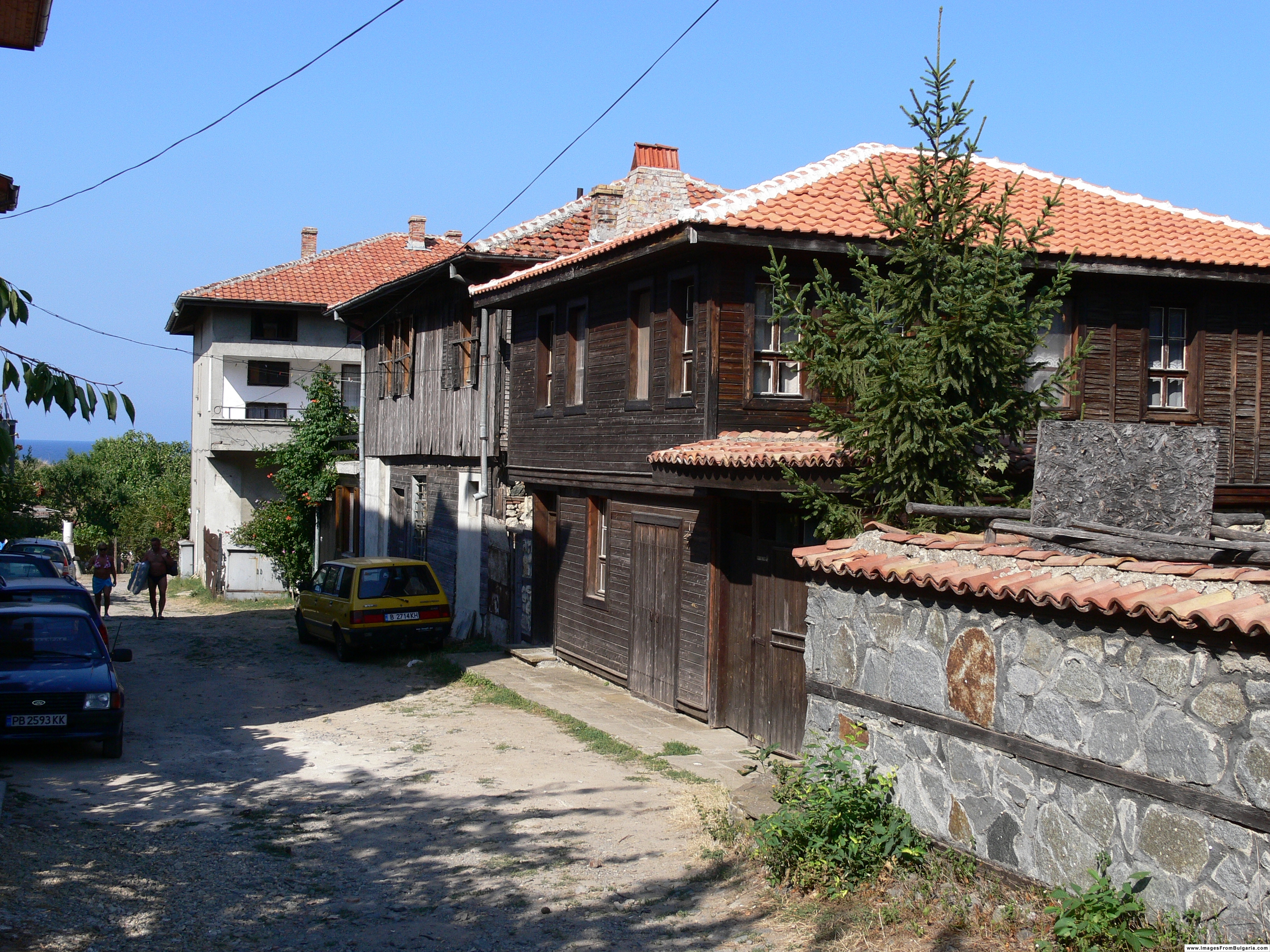
Traditional wooden houses in Vasiliko

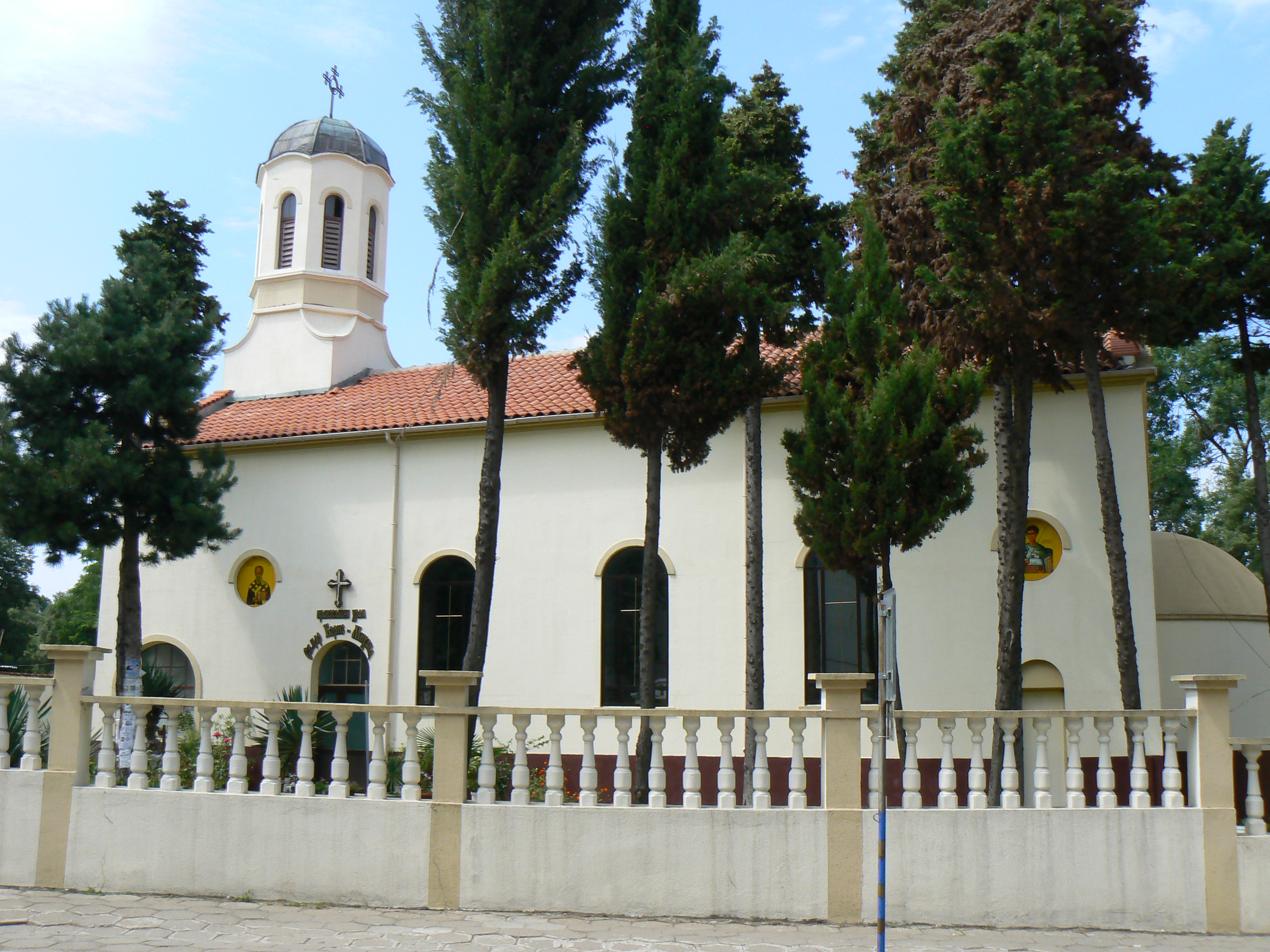
Church "St. Boris-Mihail"

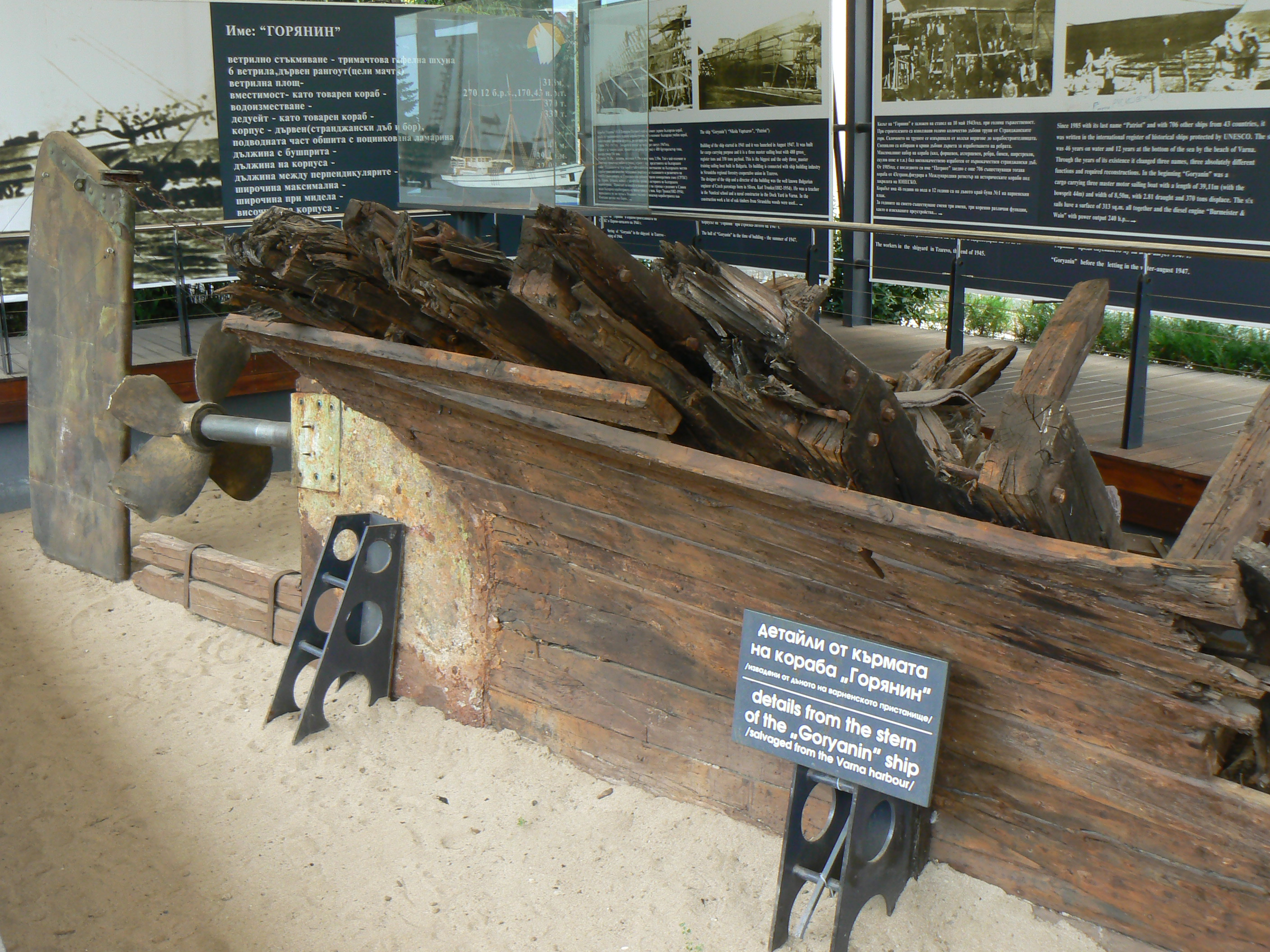
Remains of "Goryanin", the largest wooden schooner produced in Bulgaria in Tsarevo.

== Notable people ==
- Georgi Kostadinov (b. 1990) – footballer
- Momchil Ivanov – revolutionary

== Twin cities ==
- Wolgast, Germany
