= Chukovets =

Chukovets Чуковец
- Village
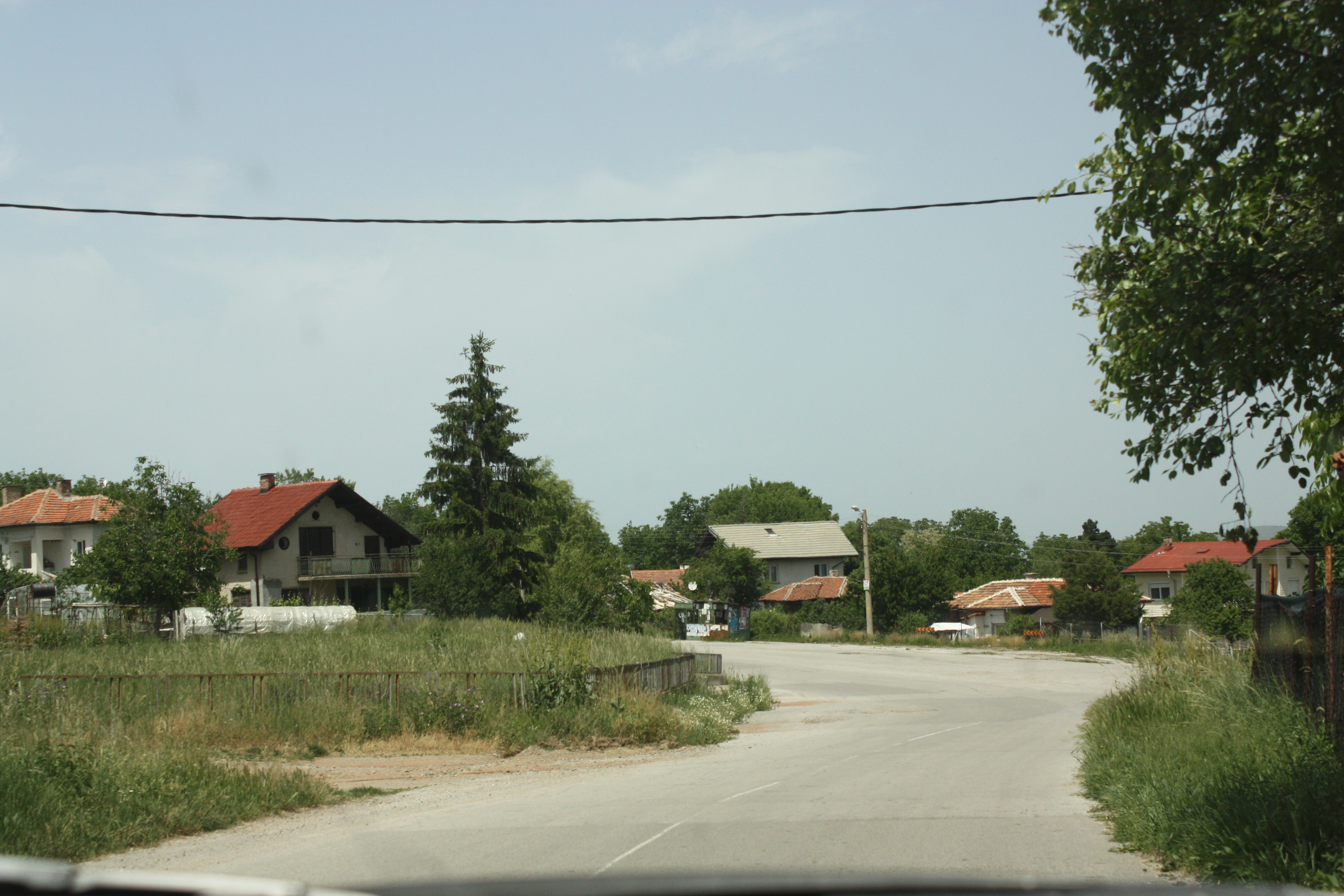

- Location of Chukovets
- Coordinates: 42°25′N 23°01′E
- Country: Bulgaria
- Province (Oblast): Pernik
- Municipality (Obshtina): Radomir
- First mentioned: 1490

Government
  - Mayor: Georgе Sarafkov Trenchev

Area
  - Land: 17,545 km^{2} (6,774 sq mi)
- Elevation: 692 m (2,270 ft)

Population (2020)
  - Total: 176
- Time zone: UTC+2 (EET)
  - Summer (DST): UTC+3 (EEST)
- Postal Code: 2425
- Postal Code: PK

Chukovets (Bulgarian: Чуковец, also transliterated Chukovec) is a village in western Bulgaria. It's located in Pernik Province, Radomir Municipality.

== Geography ==
The village of Chukovets is located in the southeastern part of the Radomir field. Radomir is 12 km away, Dupnitsa is 18 km away and Pernik is 24 km away. In ancient times, this field was the bottom of a lake, and the area was called Dark because of the frequent fog. The connection with the above cities is made by road and on the railway line Sofia - Dupnitsa, with a train stop. By car you can go to the highway Sofia - Kulata at the junction Dolna Dikanya, and the distance to Sofia is 55 km. The village is also located at the foot of the eastern ridge of the Konyovska mountain, with the highest point Viden peak with a height of 1487 m.

== History ==
A study by Prof. Hr. Gandev and R. Stoykov titled "The Bulgarian people in the 15th century" stated: "The village of Chukovcha, Radomir, Sandzak - Kyustendil has: 20 (households) widows - 7, warriors - 3, sofa - 1. The village owes - 110 akcheta of the bey in Radomir." This data consist of the first census of the population by the Turks in 1505 in the Radomir region. The village also existed during the Second Bulgarian State 1187 - 1396. The reason for this is the Gradishte fortress, which the Turks destroyed. The fortress was built with an observation tower during the reign of Tsar Mikhail Shishman in 1225.

== Religion ==
The village church "St. Nikola-Letni ”was built around 1674, and was dug into the ground, surrounded by trees, measuring only 7 by 5 m. According to some studies, the church was built around 1550.

== Institutions ==
The children from the village started studying with priest Nikola and priest Alexo and priest Nenko in 1829 in a cell school. Later, after 1878, he began secular training until the fourth grade. In 1927 a new school was built to teach children up to 7th grade. The school is named "Vasil Levski". In 1933 a community center was founded under the name "Hristo Botev". The school and the community center provide education and knowledge to hundreds of children from the village.

== Events ==
On the last Saturday of August (or August 28), there is an annual fair in the village celebrating the Assumption of St. Mary the Mother of God.
