= Zhedna =

Village in Radomir municipality, Pernik oblast, Bulgaria

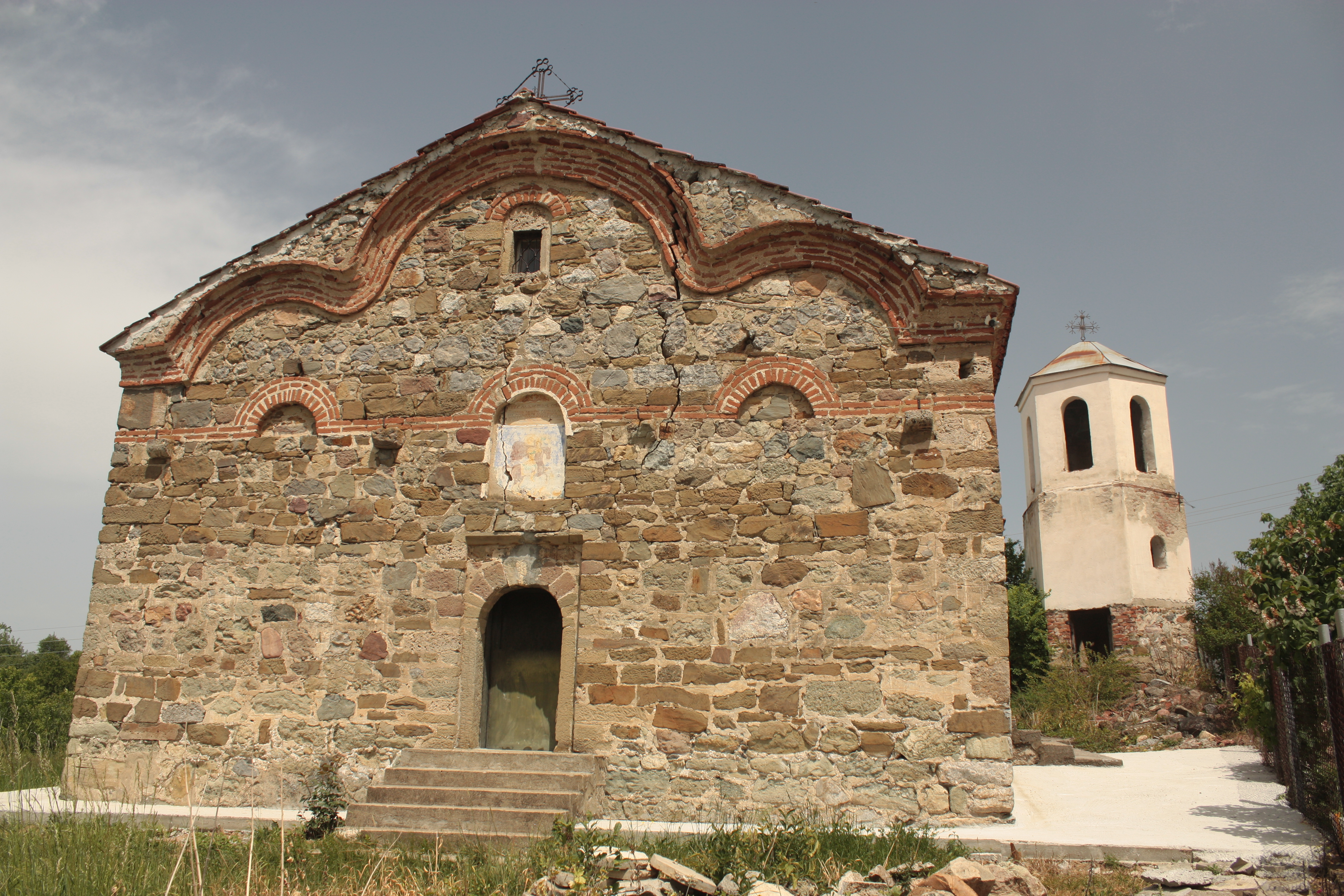

- Location of Golyamo Belovo, Bulgaria
- Coordinates: 42°25′26″N 22°57′37″E
- Country: Bulgaria
- Provinces (Oblast): Pernik Province

Population
  - Total: 112

Zhedna (Bulgarian: Жедна) is a small village in western Bulgaria. It is located at the foot of Kolosh Mountain. It is about 48 kilometres (30 mi) from the capital Sofia. It is first mentioned in document from 1446. The religion is entirely Eastern Orthodox Christianity.

The church of St. Dimitri Mirotochets has been declared an artistic monument of culture. In the village can be seen a century-old oak, whose age is over 300 years. The circumference of the log is 4.70 meters. Village has 3 Restaurants and a small local Market.

== History ==
The village was first mentioned in a Turkish document of 1446 as a dress Yapudzhak. In 1570 in the village of 105 families live, the population numbered over 600 people and is the Kyustendil sandzhakbey Ha. Along with Radomir, Chervena Mogila and Dren, it is one of the oldest settlements in Radomir Municipality.

== Geography ==
Zhedna village falls in the Kraishte region. Situated in the southern part of the extensive Radomirsko field on the northern slope of the hills of Gologlavskite Koniavska-Milevsky mountain range. Rises from the southwest hill Kolosh. The village is situated at the beginning of the pass through Konyavska Planina town of Bobov Dol. Transport is very well designed. Buses with the direction Zhedna-Sofia depart three times daily. The distance to Sofia in the bus is about 56 km (35 mi). Winter is cold and cool summer. Due to constant circulation of air masses through the gorge of Bobov Dol, the climate is very favorable for the treatment of patients with asthma and other respiratory diseases. The village is suitable for air-conditioning treatment, as demonstrated by studies of air masses in the past. The village is supplied with water by 1958, and electricity by 1946, there are irrigation and drainage systems on land which is not currently exploited. The soils are mainly black earth-Stafanovo, forest soils, and near river valleys and alluvial-meadow. Forests are oak and pine (artificially afforested). In the land of the village there are deposits of brown coal, which until recently operated by mine Ivan Roussev "at the Bobov Dol mines.

== Tourism ==
Several major tourist attractions can be mentioned in the town's surroundings, like Dupnitsa about 21 km, Kyustendil about 27 km, Pernik about 22 km, Cherno killer about 30 km, Bojanský Church about 35 km, Dragalevtsi Monastery about 37 km, Lučani (Serbia) about 48 km, Samokov about 49 km, Sofia about 56 km, cloister Rilsky about 44 km, Borovets (Bulgaria), about 55 km, Current Kobilje (Serbia) about 61 km, AND Blagoevgrad (Bulgaria) about 46 km. The nearest international airport Vasil Levski Sofia Airport (Bulgarian: Летище „Васил Левски“ - София) which is situated about 61 km (38 mi) from the town of Zhedna.

== Religion ==
Religion is wholly Orthodox Christianity.

- Church St. Demetrios Mirotochets.

The place where the church was built was donated by family Dzhaferovi. For building and taken special permission from Turkish authorities. Restrictions on its size was not because the village mosque, no competitor. The church was built with voluntary work for the population. Two brothers, builders and craftsmen Stoyu Nove Lubenov Yovichkovi. The door stands the inscription: "1862 Master Stoyu Zhedna pp. Remember me, Lord, master of the wrong fellow churches in the kingdom of the Sultan Abdul. The church was opened in 1862, the After 1961, the church is served by the village priest Klenovik. In 1979, the Church art was declared a cultural monument, but needs strengthening and major reconstruction. It is a renewal of the murals.
