= Negovantsi =

Negovantsi Негованци
- Location of Negovanci
- Coordinates: 42°27′25″N 22°56′52″E
- Country: Bulgaria
- Provinces (Oblast): Pernik

Government
  - Mayor: Emil Tanchev Yordanov
- Elevation: 635 m (2,083 ft)

Population (2012)
  - Total: 130
- Time zone: UTC+2 (EET)
  - Summer (DST): UTC+3 (EEST)
- Postal Code: 2415
- License plate: PK

Negovantsi is a village in West Bulgaria. It is in Radomir Municipality, Pernik Province.

== Geography ==
Negovantsi is next to Radomir (town). The population is 100 – 120 people.

== Cultural and natural landmarks ==
"St. Ivan Rilski" church was built in 1870.

== Regular events ==
The last Saturday of August is a village fair.
