= Dolni Rakovets =

Dolni Rakovets Долни Раковец (Bulgarian)
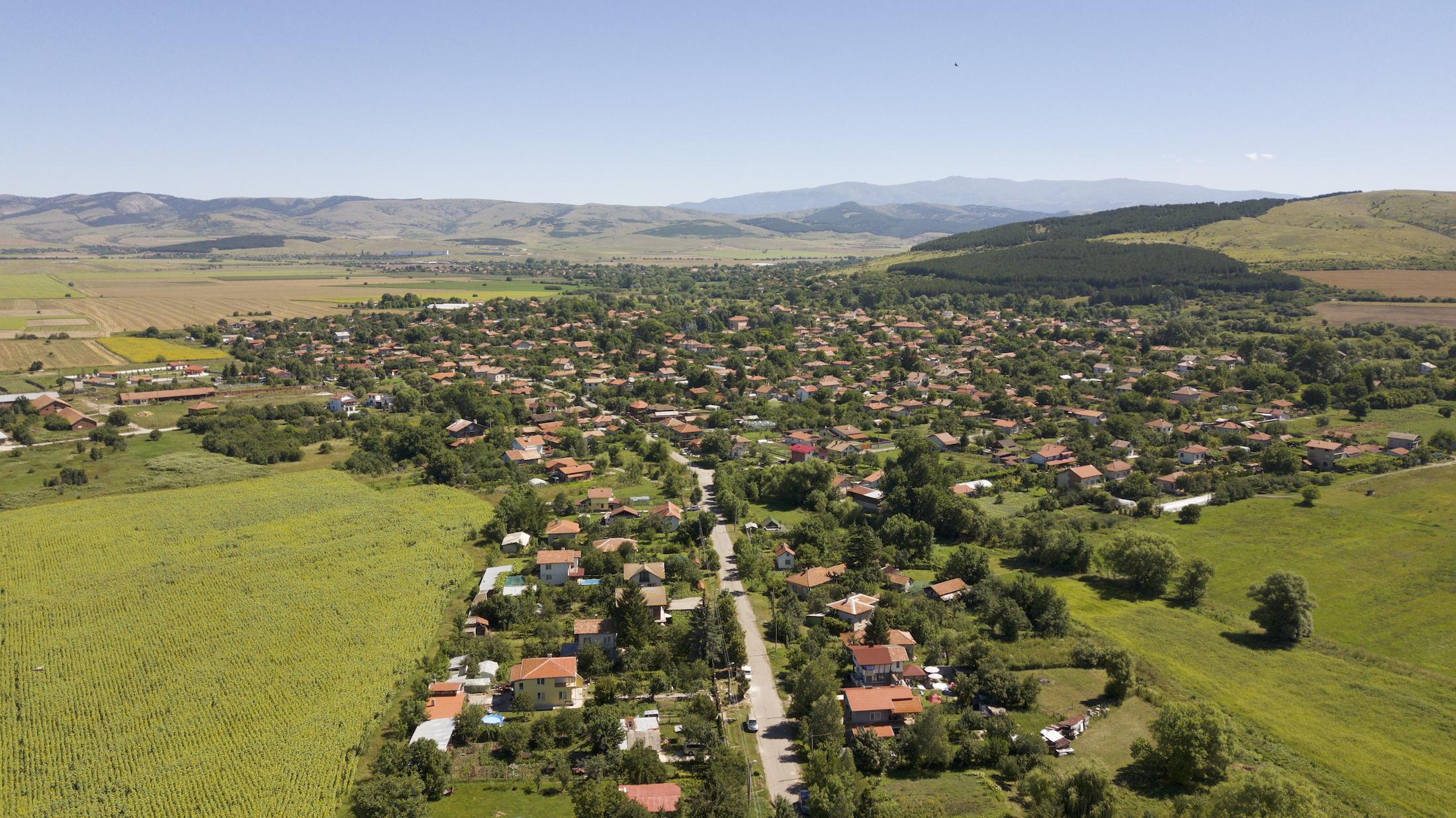
- Dolni Rakovets aerial view

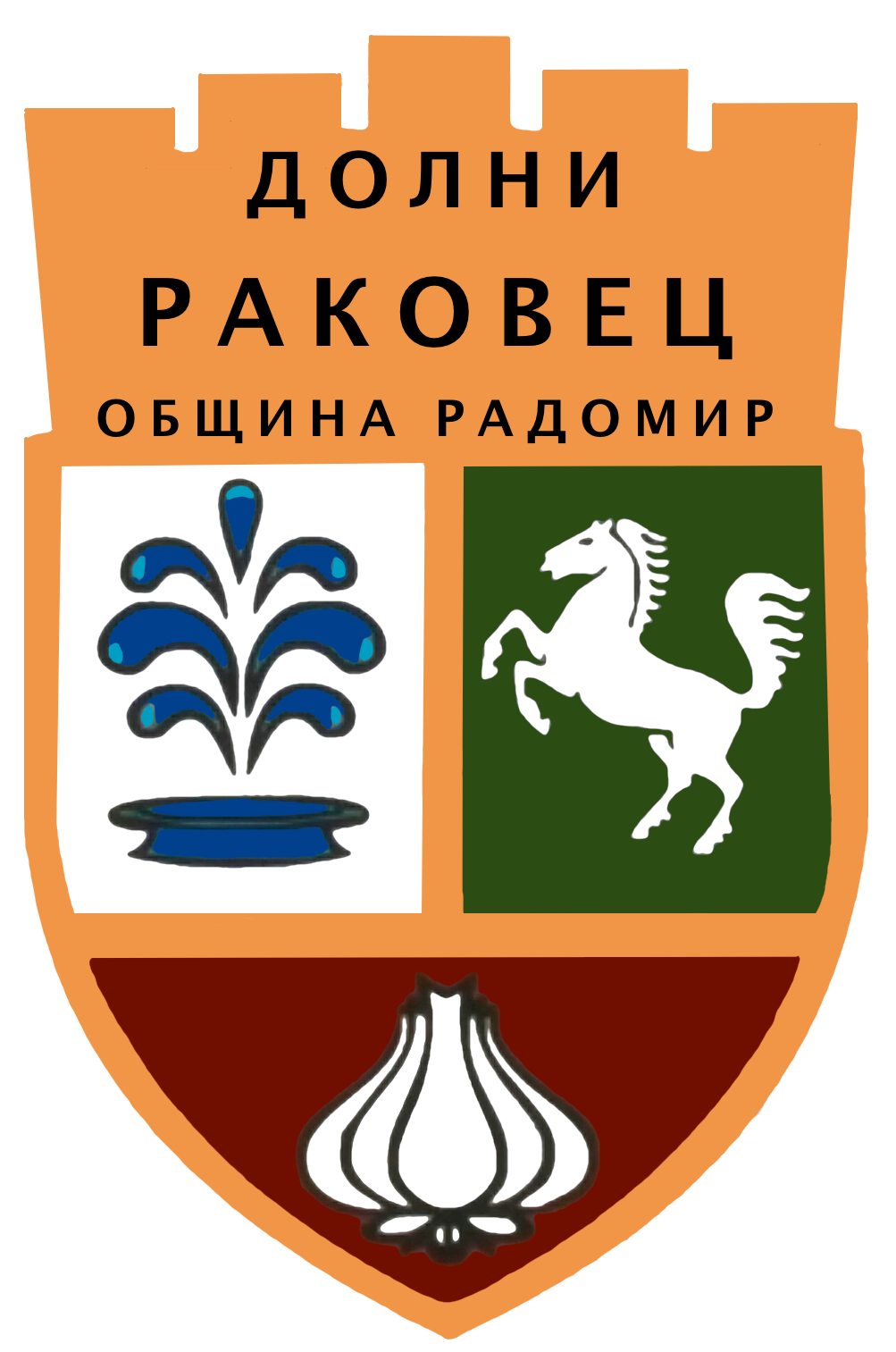
- Coat of arms

- Location of Dolni Rakovets
- Coordinates: 42°28′N 23°00′E
- Country: Bulgaria
- Provinces (Oblast): Pernik
- First mentioned: 1488
- Elevation: 632 m (2,073 ft)

Population (2011)
  - Total: 321
- Time zone: UTC+2 (EET)
  - Summer (DST): UTC+3 (EEST)
- Postal Code: 2413
- License plate: PK

Dolni Rakovets (Bulgarian: Долни Раковец) is a village in western Bulgaria. It is located in Radomir Municipality, Pernik Province. The village is known for its long traditions in garlic production.

== Geography ==
Dolni Rakovets is located 8 km southeast of Radomir, and about 25 km south of Pernik. It is situated in the middle of the Radomir plain with an average altitude of 640 m. Positioned almost centrally in the Radomir plain, it rests in the northwestern foothills of the “Ostritsa” hill, at an average altitude slightly below 640 meters. Its terrain is predominantly flat, devoid of raised forms or crossing valleys. About 1 km from the village, the southern part of its land is intersected by the Arkata river.

This region is considered one of the “high fields of Western Bulgaria” and follows the Struma river upper flow after the Pernik plain. Surrounded by a series of mountain ranges, it is encompassed by the Western portion of the Srednogorski mountain range. To the east lies the Golo Burdo Mountain, Verila to the southeast and south, Konyavska Mountain to the southwest, Zemenska Mountain to the west, and the lower ranges of Rudina and Cherna Gora to the northeast.

The total land area of Dolni Rakovets spans a little over 13,000 decares.

=== Climate ===
The climate of Dolni Rakovets is continental, characterized by the area's altitude. The snow cover can reach 30–40 cm, with occasional accumulations of up to 70–80 cm. Spring is relatively cool, with occasional frosts even in May, potentially damaging fruit blossoms and vegetables. Summers are moderately warm, rarely exceeding 30 °C. Frosts can sometimes be observed as early as mid-September. Fall is cool and often foggy. Most of the annual precipitation occurs during spring (rain) and less in winter (snow), with the driest months being summer and fall. The total annual precipitation is around 600mm. The predominant winds in the region come from the west-northwest and, to a lesser extent, from the east-northeast. Southern winds are rarer in this area.

Climate data for Dolni Rakovets, Bulgaria
Month	Jan	Feb	Mar	Apr	May	Jun	Jul	Aug	Sep	Oct	Nov	Dec	Year
Record high °C (°F)	15.2 (59.4)	19.1 (66.4)	29 (84)	30 (86)	33.1 (91.6)	34.7 (94.5)	38.2 (100.8)	37.5 (99.5)	34.5 (94.1)	32.2 (90.0)	23.2 (73.8)	17.4 (63.3)	38.2 (100.8)
Mean daily maximum °C (°F)	4.0 (39.2)	5.6 (42.1)	11.1 (52.0)	17.2 (63.0)	22.5 (72.5)	26.5 (79.7)	29.3 (84.7)	29.5 (85.1)	24.0 (75.2)	18.3 (64.9)	11.8 (53.2)	4.7 (40.5)	17.2 (63.0)
Daily mean °C (°F)	−0.8 (30.6)	1.0 (33.8)	5.4 (41.7)	11.2 (52.2)	16.0 (60.8)	20.0 (68.0)	22.5 (72.5)	22.5 (72.5)	17.8 (64.0)	12.0 (53.6)	6.9 (44.4)	0.7 (33.3)	11.3 (52.3)
Mean daily minimum °C (°F)	−4.5 (23.9)	−3.5 (25.7)	0.8 (33.4)	5.1 (41.2)	9.5 (49.1)	12.6 (54.7)	14.5 (58.1)	14.5 (58.1)	10.5 (50.9)	5.6 (42.1)	2.0 (35.6)	−2.3 (27.9)	5.4 (41.7)
Record low °C (°F)	−26.8 (−16.2)	−26.5 (−15.7)	−21.5 (−6.7)	−6.4 (20.5)	−3.6 (25.5)	1.7 (35.1)	3.5 (38.3)	3.5 (38.3)	−3 (27)	−4.9 (23.2)	−14.6 (5.7)	−18.7 (−1.7)	−26.8 (−16.2)
Average precipitation mm (inches)	43 (1.7)	37 (1.5)	37 (1.5)	53 (2.1)	71 (2.8)	77 (3.0)	48 (1.9)	39 (1.5)	43 (1.7)	52 (2.0)	56 (2.2)	48 (1.9)	604 (23.8)
Source: Stringmeteo

=== Soil and Landscape ===
The entire territory of Dolni Rakovets consists of arable agricultural land. Predominantly, crops such as wheat, sunflower, and corn are cultivated. The primary soils in this region are dark-gray to black humus rich soils, ensuring good fertility. Beneath this topsoil layer, there are dark to black, dense clays transitioning into lighter gray sandy clays and gravelly sands. These deeper layers house groundwater, which often rises to the surface. The main drainage system of the region is the Arkata river.

=== Mineral Water Resources ===
The village has mineral water springs, which locals and visitors alike can access directly from taps.

Located 50–60 meters from the village's outermost houses are nine springs that produce mineral water with a total discharge of 40-50 liters per second at temperatures of 32-34 °C. Small pools have formed near these springs, and locals refer to this spot as “the eye”. This water emerges from depths of approximately 600–700 meters, containing high amounts of carbonates and is known for its therapeutic properties. The village's water supply is sourced from these springs. Despite the karstic nature of this mineral water, it remains a significant asset to Dolni Rakovets and the surrounding region. Given its abundance, the village is immersed in lush greenery.

=== Demographics ===
The village's population has been predominantly of Bulgarian descent since its establishment until the mid-20th century. However, subsequent migrations saw settlers from various parts of Bulgaria moving in. The local inhabitants are descendants of the ancient Shopi tribe, known locally as „Mrakantsi“. During the 1930s, the village had up to 1,500 inhabitants. However, there has been a progressive decline since the mid-1950s, dropping to around 350 residents at the beginning of the 21st century.

== History ==
=== Ancient and Antiquity ===
In ancient times, the local population of the village was the Thracian tribe Agriani, ruled by king Langarus. Their administrative center was Dikanya, located in today's village of Gorna Dikanya. The Agrianians were allies with Alexander the Great during his expedition to India.

A significant Roman road connecting Serdika (present-day Sofia) to Pautalia (present-day Kyustendil) passed through Dolni Rakovets. Road station Elea was located at „Tikov gûrbezh“ in Dolni Rakovets, from where the distance to Serdika was 24 Roman miles and to Pautalia 28 Roman miles.

=== Middle Ages ===
The current Dolni Rakovets village was established during the medieval period of the Second Bulgarian Empire (13th-14th centuries). It consistently remained an integral part of the ethnogeographical region of Mrakata. The high Radomir plateau was a significant military and trade crossroad, even during ancient times. Alexander the Great passed through this region during his campaign to fortify the Danube frontier of his empire. The revered Bulgarian saint, Ivan Rilski, resided in this area before retreating to the Rila Mountain. The village's settlement likely originated from Bulgarians living near mineral springs.

=== Post-Liberation ===
The earliest written records of the village date from the initial decades of Ottoman rule. An old Turkish document from 1488 references the village by the name Rakuvchă, which remained mostly unchanged until the Liberation. During the Russo-Turkish War, before the arrival of Russian troops, local residents drove out the Turks in what became known as the Shop Uprising, led by Lieutenant Simo Sokolov. After the Berlin Congress, Dolni Rakovets remained within the borders of the Principality of Bulgaria, marking a period of significant development. Despite the proximity of the Serbian-Bulgarian War battlegrounds, the village remained untouched by enemy invasion. Mobilized men, likely within the Second Struma Regiment, pursued the invaders to Pirot. In just 25 years (from 1882 to 1907), the village expanded from 33 households with 525 people to 176 households with 1,204 residents. The average family size was seven members until around 1930. By 1926, growth had slowed, with the household count reaching 209 and a population of 1,467.

== Infrastructure ==
The transport is well developed and integrated with the national transport system. Dolni Rakovets is situated just 13 km from the Struma motorway, which links Sofia with the Kulata border checkpoint connecting Bulgaria with Greece.

Dolni Rakovets train station is part of Railway Line 5 running from Sofia to Kulata. Over 10 trains pass through the village daily.

Situated 5 km south of the village is the Dolni Rakovets Airbase (ICAO: LBSW), constructed for military purposes between 1962 and 1966. The concrete runway measures 2,450 m in length and 50 m in width. In 2011, the airport was acquired by „Selim-Co“ for 1.25 million leva, subsequently renamed as Sofia West Airport. Plans by the new owners aim to transform it into Bulgaria's first private international airport.

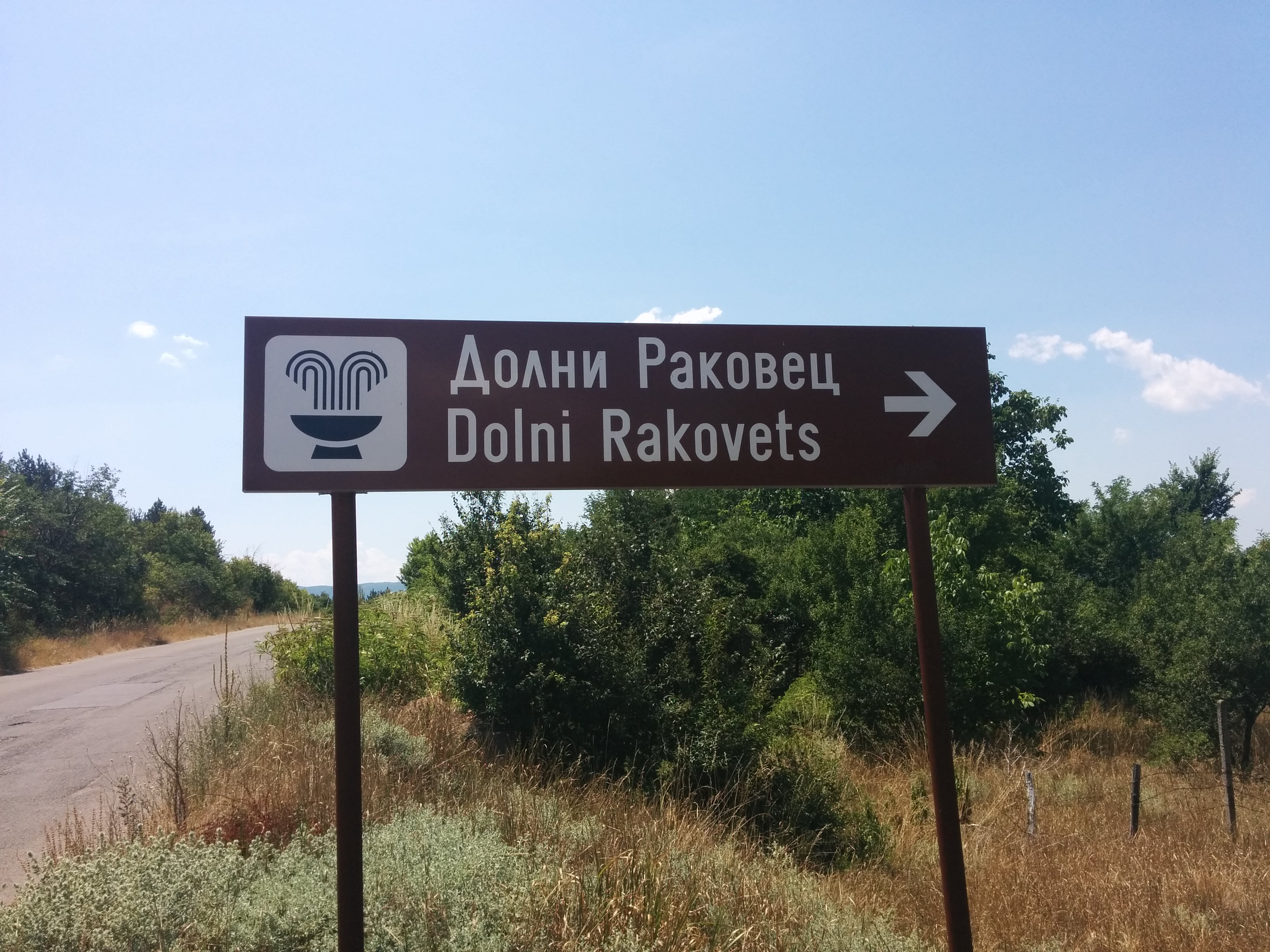
Dolni Rakovets roadsign

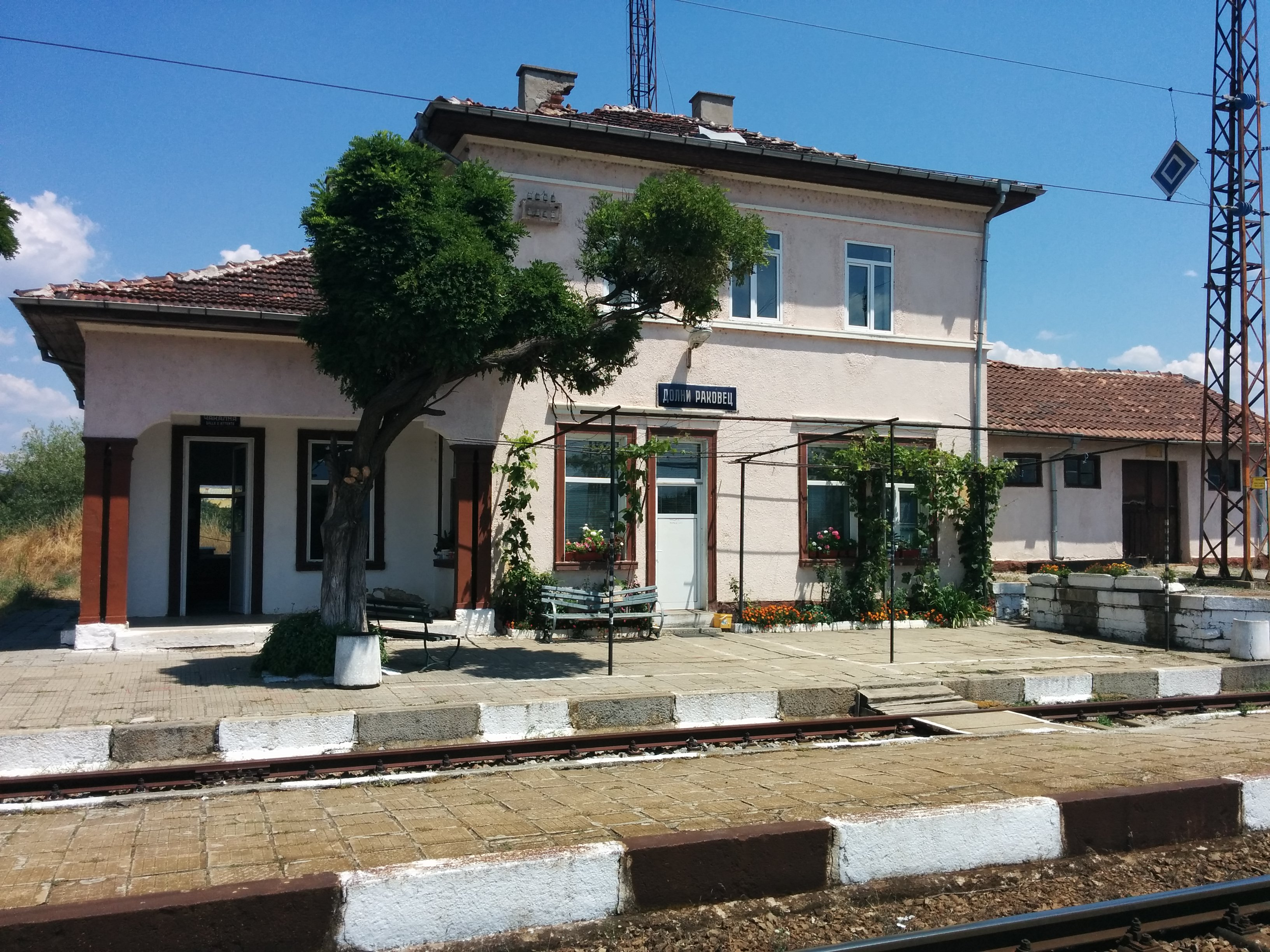
The train station

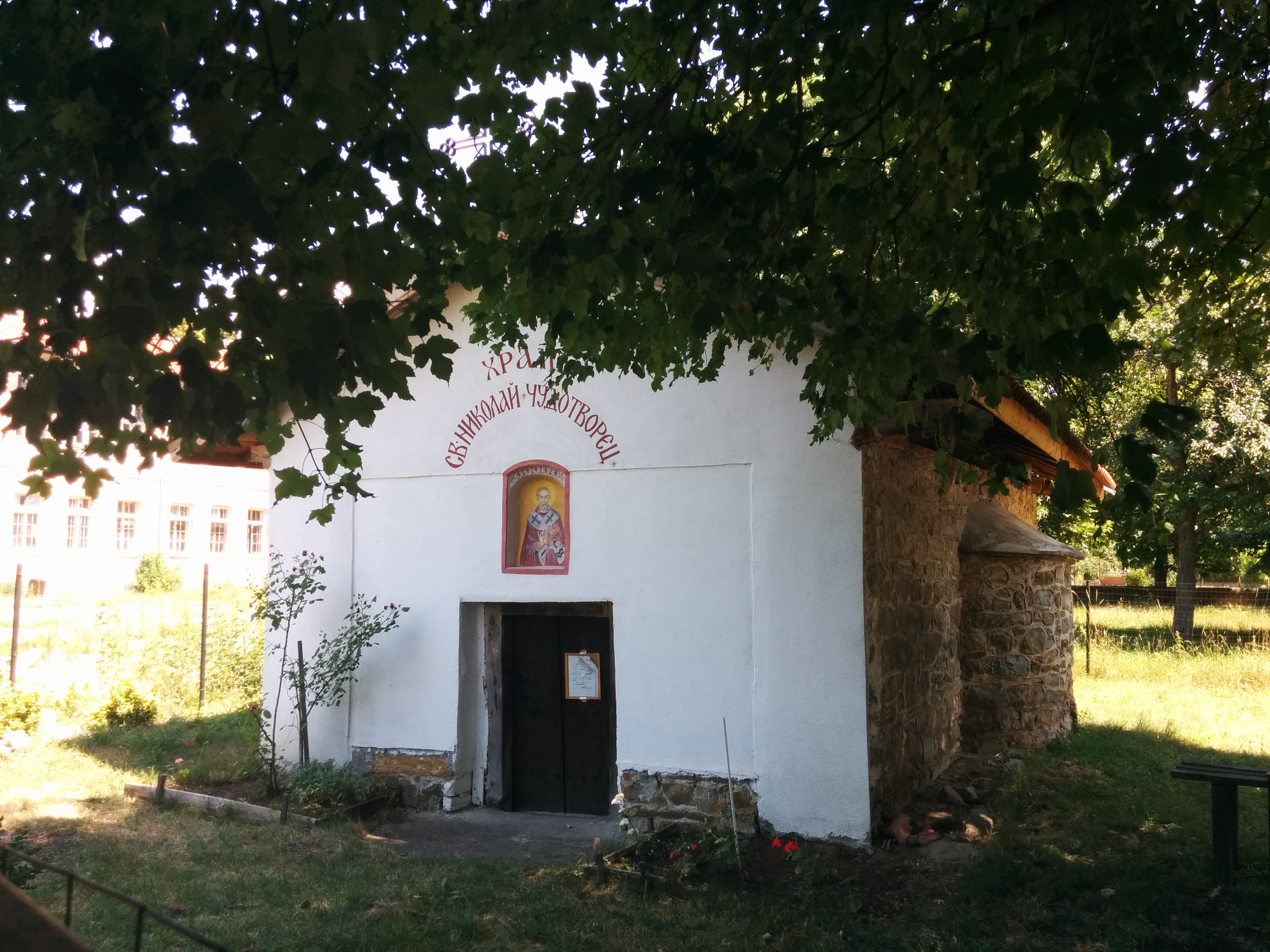
The old church from the 15th century
