= Boboratsi =

Village in western Bulgaria

Boboratsi Бобораци
- Village
- Location of Boboratsi
- Coordinates: 42°28′21″N 22°57′54″E
- Country: Bulgaria
- Province (Oblast): Pernik
- Municipality (Obshtina): Radomir
- First mentioned: 1576

Government
  - Mayor: Angelica Adele Behnam

Area
  - Land: 772 km^{2} (298 sq mi)
- Elevation: 583 m (1,913 ft)

Population (2020)
  - Total: 84
- Time zone: UTC+2 (EET)
  - Summer (DST): UTC+3 (EEST)
- Postal Code: 2454
- License plate: PK

Boboratsi (Bulgarian: Бобораци, also transliterated Boboraci) is a village in western Bulgaria. Its located in Pernik Province, Radomir Municipality.

== Geography ==
Boboratsi is located in the Radomir valley along the Struma River, between the Konyavska valley, the Golotlovo heights, Golo Brdo, Verila and Cherna gora. The average altitude is 600 – 660 m, the climate is moderately continental. It is drained by the river Struma and the river Blato (Arkata). The soils are chernozem-resinous and alluvial-meadow. There are favorable conditions for growing cereals, flax, fruits and livestock. The valley crosses at the eastern end of the railway line and the Sofia-Athens road.

== History ==
At the outbreak of the Balkan War, a man from Boboratsi was a volunteer in the Macedonian-Adrianopolitan corps.

== Cultural and natural landmarks ==
In the village there is a church "St. Petka", which dates back to the time when the village was established. There was also a school some time ago, but only the ruined building remains. In the center of the village there is a monument to those killed in the war. Boboratsi is also known as one of the world's stork nests. After the drainage of the swamp, the population of frogs and storks decreases, because their natural source of food is very limited.

== Events ==
Every year on Petkov Day a fair is organized.
