= Fermata 2019 =

- Season 5
- Presented by: Ivan Hristov; Andrey Arnaudov
- No. of days: 100
- No. of castaways: 22
- Winner: Veselka Marinova
- Runner-up: Krasimir Dzhunov
- Location: Gorna Dikanya, Bulgaria
- No. of episodes: 85

Release
- Original network: bTV
- Original release: 6 September – 14 December 2019

Season chronology
- ← Previous; Fermata 2018 Next → Fermata 2020

Fermata 2019 (The Farm 2019) is the fifth season of the Bulgarian version of The Farm. The season consists of 22 Bulgarians returning to Gorna Dikanya where they compete on the farm and live like it was a century prior. Each week, the head of the farm nominates one person to be in a duel, the nominee then chooses who they'll face off against in one of three challenges. The person who loses the duel is sent home but not before writing a letter delivered to the farm stating who the head of farm for the next week is. The winner is decided in a live finale via public voting where the winner receives a grand prize of 100,000 лв. The season premiered on 6 September 2019 and concluded on 14 December 2019 where Veselka Marinova won in the public vote against Krasimir Dzhunov for the grand prize and the title of Fermata 2019.

== Contestants ==
Contestant	Age	Residence	Entered	Exited	Status	Finish
Tanja Vasileva	41	Varna	Day 1	Day 6	Medically evacuated Day 6	22nd
Ivan Milin	30	Razlog	Day 1	Day 18	Ejected; Day 18	21st
Sanja Borisova	36	Sofia	Day 1	Day 21	3rd Evicted; Day 21	20th
Tihomir Rangelov	32	Sofia	Day 1	Day 7	1st Evicted; Day 7	19th
Tihomir Rangelov	32	Sofia	Day 8	Day 28	4th Evicted; Day 28	19th
Orlin Goranov; Special Guest	62	Sofia	Day 1	Day 30	Finished Task; Day 30	18th
Kristijana Branzalova	25	Sofia	Day 1	Day 35	5th Evicted; Day 35	17th
Aleksandar Todorov	40	Blagoevgrad	Day 1	Day 42	6th Evicted; Day 42	16th
Ivaylo Shopski	36	Sofia	Day 1	Day 49	7th Evicted; Day 49	15th
Paulina Vanegas	29	Sofia	Day 1	Day 56	8th Evicted; Day 56	14th
Mariana Marinova	37	Sofia	Day 1	Day 63	9th Evicted; Day 63	13th
Vencislav Dimitrov	47	Sofia	Day 1	Day 70	10th Evicted; Day 70	12th
Silvija Miteva	32	Nesebar	Day 1	Day 77	11th Evicted; Day 77	11th
Krasimira Cocheva	30	Sofia	Day 1	Day 84	12th Evicted; Day 84	10th
Elizabet Ilcheva	28	Sofia	Day 1	Day 88	13th Evicted; Day 88	9th
Dimitar Kalajdzhiev	25	Blagoevgrad	Day 1	Day 14	2nd Evicted; Day 14	8th
Dimitar Kalajdzhiev	25	Blagoevgrad	Day 20	Day 92	14th Evicted; Day 92	8th
Dana Vitkova	47	Wolfsburg, Germany	Day 1	Day 95	15th Evicted; Day 95	7th
Velislava Dimitrova	25	Meppen, Germany	Day 1	Day 95	15th Evicted; Day 95	7th
Dimitar Karaivanov	35	Dimitrovgrad	Day 1	Day 96	16th Evicted; Day 96	6th
Stanislav Borisov	32	Sofia	Day 1	Day 97	17th Evicted; Day 97	5th
Margarita Hristova	36	Sofia	Day 1	Day 98	18th Evicted; Day 98	4th
Sami Hossni	27	Stara Zagora	Day 1	Day 99	19th Evicted; Day 99	3rd
Krasimir Dzhunov	37	San Sebastián, Spain	Day 1	Day 100	Runner-up; Day 100	2nd
Veselka Marinova	22	Borima	Day 1	Day 100	Winner; Day 100	1st

== The game ==
Week	Head of Farm	Butlers	1st Dueler	2nd Dueler	Evicted	Finish
1 (Note: For week 1, the farmers decided amongst themselves the two to compete in a duel.)	None	None	Ivan	Tihomir	Tanja	Medically evacuated Day 6
1	None	None	Ivan	Tihomir	Tihomir	1st Evicted; Day 7
2	Ivan; Krasimir (Note: From weeks 2 through 6, the farmers were divided into two farms, each with their own head of farm and butlers.)	Ivaylo; Kristijana; Stanislav; Dana & Velislava	Stanislav	Dimitar Kal.	Dimitar Kal.	2nd Evicted; Day 14
3	Dimitar Kar. Stanislav	Sami; Sanja; Tihomir; Silvija	Sanja	Margarita	Ivan	Ejected; Day 18
3	Dimitar Kar. Stanislav	Sami; Sanja; Tihomir; Silvija	Sanja	Margarita	Sanja	3rd Evicted; Day 21
4	Mariana; Margarita	Dimitar Kar. Elizabet; Tihomir; Veselka	Tihomir	Sami	Tihomir	4th Evicted; Day 28
5	Sami; Vencislav	Aleksandar; Krasimira; Krasimir; Paulina	Krasimira	Kristijana	Orlin	Finished Task; Day 30
5	Sami; Vencislav	Aleksandar; Krasimira; Krasimir; Paulina	Krasimira	Kristijana	Kristijana	5th Evicted; Day 35
6	Dimitar Kal. Krasimira	Ivaylo; Mariana; Margarita; Vencislav	Ivaylo	Aleksandar	Aleksandar	6th Evicted; Day 42
7	Ivaylo	Dimitar Kar. Silvija	Dimitar Kar.	Ivaylo (Note: Although Ivaylo was the Head of the Farm, he decided to put himself into the duel.)	Ivaylo	7th Evicted; Day 49
8	Dimitar Kar.	Paulina; Stanislav	Paulina	Elizabet	Paulina	8th Evicted; Day 56
9	Krasimir	Sami; Silvija	Silvija	Mariana	Mariana	9th Evicted; Day 63
10	Silvija	Dimitar Kal. Margarita	Dimitar Kal.	Vencislav	Vencislav	10th Evicted; Day 70
11	Stanislav	Dimitar Kar. Dana & Velislava	Velislava	Silvija	Silvija	11th Evicted; Day 77
12	Dana & Velislava	Dimitar Kar. Elizabet	Elizabet	Krasimira	Krasimira	12th Evicted; Day 84
13	Dimitar Kal.	Stanislav; Veselka	Veselka	Elizabet	Elizabet	13th Evicted; Day 88
14	Dimitar Kar.	Krasimir; Sami	Krasimir	Dimitar Kal.	Dimitar Kal.	14th Evicted; Day 92
