= Fermata 2017 =

- Season 3
- Presented by: Ivan Hristov; Andrey Arnaudov
- No. of days: 99
- No. of castaways: 22
- Winner: Yani Andreev
- Runners-up: Valeria Docheva; Kaloyan Dimitrov; Violeta Todorova
- Location: Studena, Bulgaria
- No. of episodes: 85

Release
- Original network: bTV
- Original release: 10 September – 17 December 2017

Season chronology
- ← Previous; Fermata 2016 Next → Fermata 2018

Fermata 2017 (The Farm 2017) is the third season of the Bulgarian version of The Farm. The season consists of 22 Bulgarians competing on the farm and live like it was a century prior. Each week, the head of the farm nominates one person to be in a duel, the nominee then chooses who they'll face off against in one of three challenges. The person who loses the duel is sent home but not before writing a letter delivered to the farm stating who the head of farm for the next week is. The winner is decided in a live finale via public voting where the winner receives a grand prize of 100,000 лв. The season premiered on 10 September 2017 and concluded on 17 December 2017 where after 99 days, in a live finale, Yani Andreev won in the final challenge against Valeria Docheva, Kaloyan Dimitrov and Violeta Todorova to win the grand prize and Fermata 2017.

== Contestants ==
Contestant	Age	Residence	Entered	Exited	Status	Finish
Ivan Laskin	47	Sofia	Day 1	Day 3	Quit; Day 3	22nd
Toma “Ailyaka” Talepov	45	Burgas	Day 1	Day 7	1st Evicted; Day 7	21st
Diana Milicevic	26	Munich, Germany	Day 1	Day 14	2nd Evicted; Day 14	20th
Vladimir Karolev; Special Guest	56	Sofia	Day 1	Day 20	Finished Task; Day 20	19th
Mikhail Mikhailov	37	Sliven	Day 1	Day 21	3rd Evicted; Day 21	18th
Vladimir Nikolov	39	Sofia	Day 1	Day 32	Quit; Day 28	17th
Anita Garkova	28	Pirdop	Day 1	Day 35	4th Evicted; Day 35	16th
Ivan Sapundzhiev	42	Voluyak	Day 1	Day 42	5th Evicted; Day 42	15th
Bozhidara Bakalova	36	Sofia	Day 1	Day 49	6th Evicted; Day 49	14th
Ivona Penchovska	25	Sofia	Day 1	Day 56	7th Evicted; Day 56	13th
Francesca Saita	28	Sofia	Day 1	Day 63	8th Evicted; Day 63	12th
Ivan Ginchev	33	Berlin, Germany	Day 1	Day 70	9th Evicted; Day 70	11th
Darina Vasileva	51	Kableshkovo	Day 1	Day 77	10th Evicted; Day 77	10th
Gecho Gechev	52	Liège, Belgium	Day 1	Day 84	11th Evicted; Day 84	9th
Marina Nabievna Suchkova	46	Sofia	Day 1	Day 91	12th Evicted; Day 91	8th
Stanislav Laskin	29	Samokov	Day 1	Day 96	13th Evicted; Day 96	7th
Elena Andreeva	30	Sofia	Day 1	Day 97	14th Evicted; Day 97	6th
Alec Manolov	31	German	Day 1	Day 98	15th Evicted; Day 98	5th
Violeta Todorova	28	Sofia	Day 1	Day 99	3rd Runner-up; Day 99	4th
Kaloyan Dimitrov	24	Sofia	Day 1	Day 99	2nd Runner-up; Day 99	3rd
Valeria Docheva	23	Stara Zagora	Day 1	Day 99	Runner-up; Day 99	2nd
Yani Andreev	29	Kozlets	Day 1	Day 99	Winner; Day 99	1st

== The game ==
Week	Head of Farm	Butlers	1st Dueler	2nd Dueler	Evicted	Finish
1	Vladimir K.	Francesca; Yani	Yani	Ailyaka	Ivan L.	Quit; Day 3
1	Vladimir K.	Francesca; Yani	Yani	Ailyaka	Aliyaka	1st Evicted; Day 7
2	Marina	Diana; Kaloyan	Diana	Ivona	Diana	2nd Evicted; Day 14
3	Alec	Marina; Mikhail	Mikhail	Ivan G.	Vladimir K.	Finished Task; Day 20
3	Alec	Marina; Mikhail	Mikhail	Ivan G.	Mikhail	3rd Evicted; Day 28
4	Bozhidara	Elena; Vladimir N.	Vladimir N.	Yani	Vladimir N. (Note: Although Yani lost the duel, Vladimir N. decided to quit the game. Yani was allowed to stay in the game as a result.)	Quit; Day 28
5	Gecho	Bozhidara; Ivan S.	Bozhidara	Anita	Anita	4th Evicted; Day 35
6	Stanislav	Darina; Ivan G.	Ivan G.	Ivan S.	Ivan S.	5th Evicted; Day 42
7	Yani	Bozhidara; Gecho	Bozhidara	Darina	Bozhidara	6th Evicted; Day 49
8	Darina	Gecho; Ivona	Ivona	Violeta	Ivona	7th Evicted; Day 56
9	Elena	Darina; Marina	Darina	Francesca	Francesca	8th Evicted; Day 63
10	Kaloyan	Alec; Violeta	Alec	Ivan G.	Ivan G.	9th Evicted; Day 70
11	Alec	Elena; Kaloyan	Elena	Darina	Darina	10th Evicted; Day 77
12	Kaloyan	Stanislav; Valeria	Stanislav	Gecho	Gecho	11th Evicted; Day 84
13	Alec	Kaloyan; Violeta	Violeta	Marina	Marina	12th Evicted; Day 91
14	None		Stanislav	Yani	Stanislav	13th Evicted; Day 96
14	None		Valeria	Elena	Elena	14th Evicted; Day 97
14	None		Alec	Violeta	Alec	15th Evicted; Day 98
15	Final Duel/Public Vote				Violeta	3rd Runner-up; Day 99
15	Final Duel/Public Vote				Kaloyan	2nd Runner-up; Day 99
15	Final Duel/Public Vote				Valeria	Runner-up; Day 99
15	Final Duel/Public Vote				Yani	Winner; Day 99
