= Belanitsa =

Belanitsa Беланица
- Village
- Location of Belanitsa
- Coordinates: 42°28′59″N 22°56′16″E
- Country: Bulgaria
- Province (Oblast): Pernik
- Municipality (Obshtina): Radomir
- First mentioned: 1576

Government
  - Mayor: Kiril Stoev

Area
  - Land: 1.804 km^{2} (0.697 sq mi)
- Elevation: 641 m (2,103 ft)

Population (2020)
  - Total: 18
- Time zone: UTC+2 (EET)
  - Summer (DST): UTC+3 (EEST)
- Postal Code: 2453
- License plate: PK

Belanitsa (Bulgarian: Беланица, also transliterated Belanica) is a village in western Bulgaria. It is located in Pernik Province, Radomir Municipality.

== Geography ==
The village of Belanitsa is located in the lowest part of the Radomir field: The village of Priboy is nearby.
