= Busintsi =

Busintsi Бусинци
- Village
- Location within Bulgaria
- Coordinates: 42°47′N 22°38′E
- Country: Bulgaria
- Oblast: Pernik
- Opština: Trun

Government
  - Mayor: Tsvetislava Tsvetkova (GERB)

Area
  - Total: 10.335 km^{2} (3.990 sq mi)
- Elevation: 805 m (2,641 ft)

Population (2024)
  - Total: 46
  - Density: 4.5/km^{2} (12/sq mi)
- Postal code: 2486
- Area code: 07732
- Vehicle registration: РК

Busintsi is a village in Tran Municipality, Pernik Province in western Bulgaria. It is famous for its pottery.

The village is located at 805 meters above sea level. Its population is 46 persons.
