= Zelenigrad =

Village in western Bulgaria

Zelenigrad Зелениград
- Village
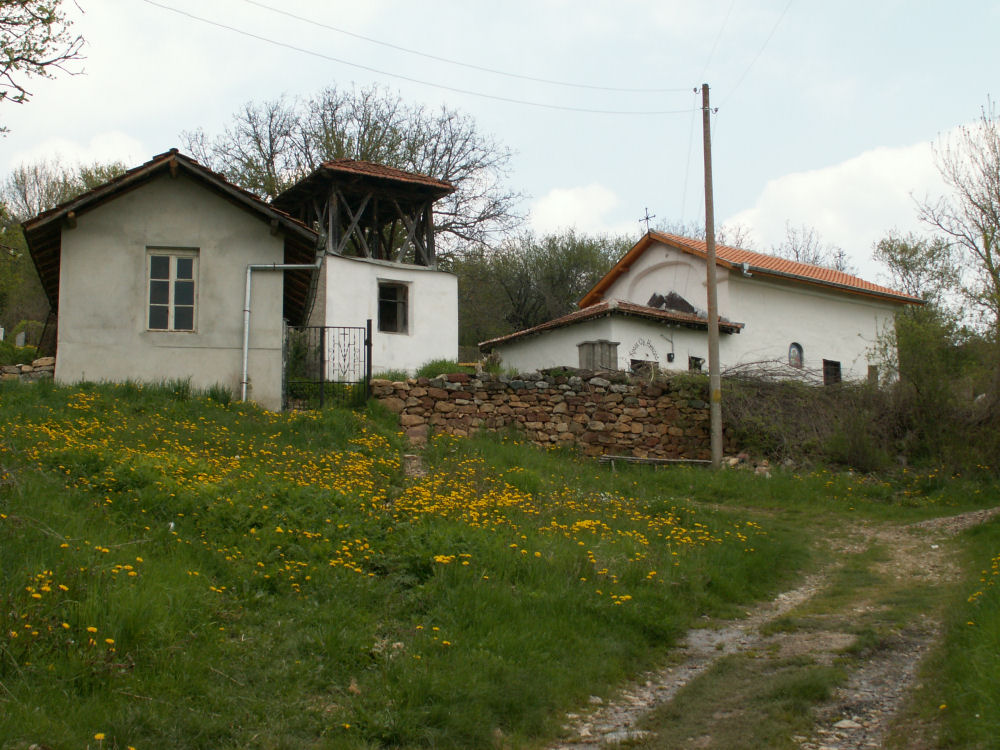

- Location within Bulgaria
- Coordinates: 42°50′13.92″N 22°33′42.12″E
- Country: Bulgaria
- Province: Pernik Province
- Municipality: Tran Municipality
- Elevation: 888 m (2,913 ft)

Population (2015)
  - Total: 101

Zelenigrad (Bulgarian: Зелениград) is a small village in western Bulgaria. It is located in the municipality of Tran, Pernik Province.

== History ==
In 1833 the church of St. Nicholas (Sveti Nikolay) was built on the foundations of an old, medieval church. The village was electrified in 1943. The local school was closed in 1974 due to a lack of students.
