= X-ray (disambiguation) =

X-rays are a form of electromagnetic radiation or radiographs: photographs made with X-rays.

X-ray or Xray may also refer to:

== Arts and entertainment ==
- X-Ray (ballet), a 1994 ballet by Peter Martins, set to John Adams's Violin Concerto
- X-Ray (book), a 1994 "unauthorized autobiography" by Ray Davies of the Kinks
- X-ray (chess), a chess tactic
- X-Ray (film) or Hospital Massacre, a 1982 slasher film
- "X-Ray" (song), by Camouflage, 1996
- X-Ray (television), consumer programme produced by BBC Cymru Wales
- X-ray art, a traditional style of Aboriginal Australian painting; see Bark painting § Cross-hatching (rarrk)
- "X-Ray", a song by Left Spine Down from Caution
- X-Ray, a member of the hip hop collective Monsta Island Czars
- "X-Ray", a song by Daughters from Hell Songs

=== Fictional entities ===
- X-Ray (comics), a fictional character appearing in material published by Marvel Comics
- X-Ray, a character from the novel Holes
- X-ray vision, the fictional ability of a character to see through outer layers of objects or clothing on people

== Computing ==
- X-Ray (Amazon), a reference tool incorporated in Amazon Kindle e-readers
- X-Ray Engine, a graphics engine used in S.T.A.L.K.E.R. videogame series
- Instruments (software), a performance visualizer built into Mac OS X v10.5, formerly called Xray
- Project X, a core for the V2Ray project

== Military ==
- Landing Zone X-Ray, a landing zone in the Battle of Ia Drang
- X-Ray, a code name for an event of Operation Sandstone, a nuclear weapon test series conducted by the US in April 1948
- X-Ray, shorthand slang to designate "possible enemies" or "possible targets"

== Other uses ==
- X-Ray, the letter X in the NATO phonetic alphabet
- XRAY Model Racing Cars, Slovak radio controlled cars; see List of model car brands
- Lada Xray, a subcompact crossover SUV produced by AvtoVAZ
- Dentsply Sirona stock ticker

== See also ==
- The Lady with the X-Ray Eyes (1934), an absurdist fiction novel by Svetoslav Minkov
