= Bornarevo =

Bornarevo Борнарево
- Village
- Location of Bornarevo
- Coordinates: 42°32′N 22°55′E
- Country: Bulgaria
- Province (Oblast): Pernik
- Municipality (Obshtina): Radomir

Government
  - Mayor: Rositsa Ilieva

Area
  - Land: 5.565 km^{2} (2.149 sq mi)
- Elevation: 706 m (2,316 ft)

Population (2020)
  - Total: 51
- Time zone: UTC+2 (EET)
  - Summer (DST): UTC+3 (EEST)
- Postal Code: 2407
- License plate: PK

Bornarevo (Bulgarian: Борнарево) is a village in western Bulgaria. Its located in Pernik Province, Radomir Municipality.
