= Galabnik =

Galabnik Гълъбник
- Village
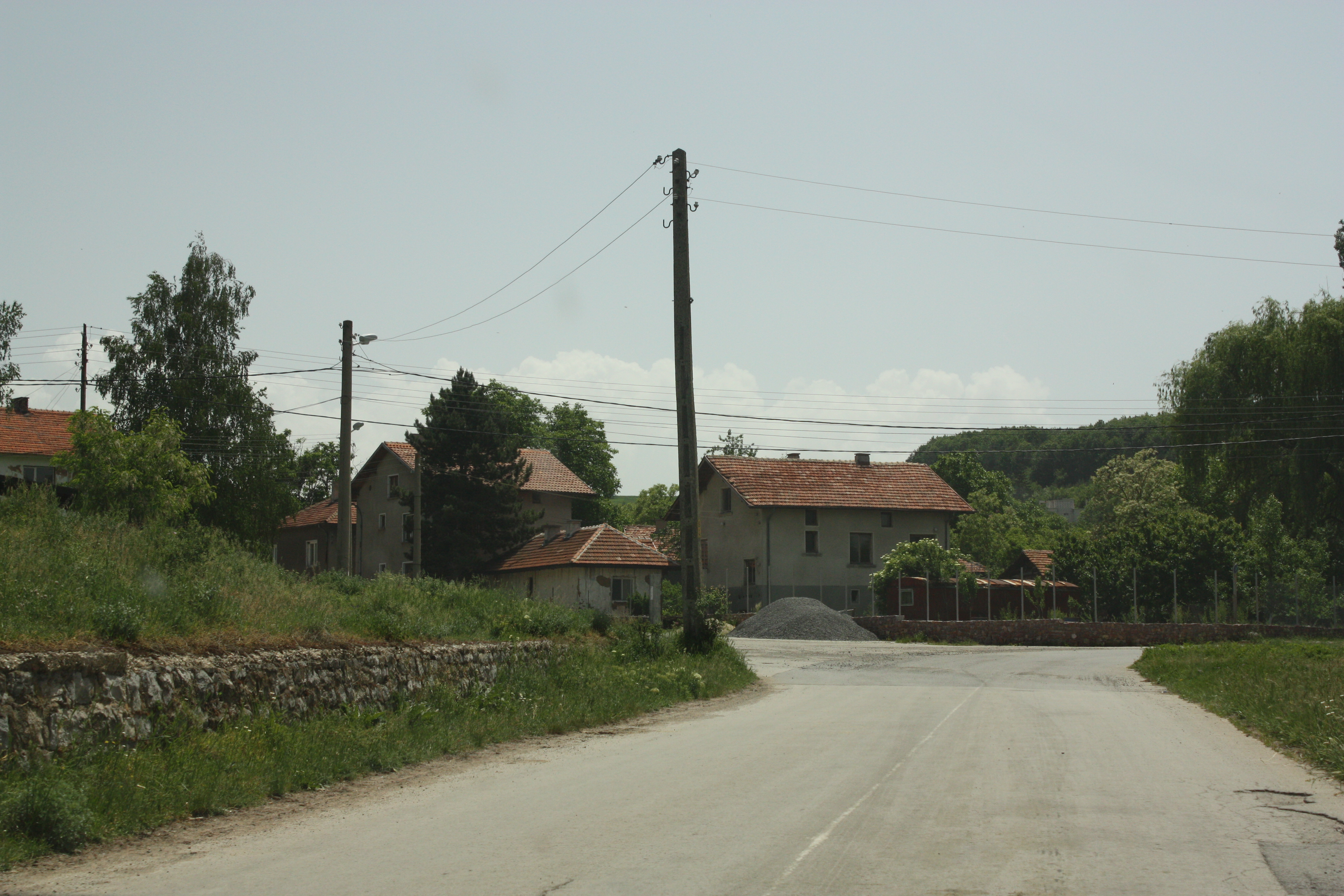

- Location of Galabnik
- Coordinates: 42°24′N 23°04′E
- Country: Bulgaria
- Province (Oblast): Pernik
- Municipality (Obshtina): Radomir
- First mentioned: 1570

Government
  - Mayor: Diana Borisova

Area
  - Land: 22,971 km^{2} (8,869 sq mi)
- Elevation: 672 m (2,205 ft)

Population (2020)
  - Total: 217
- Time zone: UTC+2 (EET)
  - Summer (DST): UTC+3 (EEST)
- Postal Code: 2426
- License plate: PK

Galabnik (Bulgarian: Гълъбник) is a village in western Bulgaria. Its located in Pernik Province, Radomir Municipality.

== Geography ==
Galabnik is located in the Radomir valley. There is a railway line Sofia-Pernik-Dupnitsa-Blagoevgrad-Petrich.

== History ==
The old name of the village is Muzibek, which is also retained by a later stage of Turkish presence in the region and the technical bey (Musabey). On September 21, 1972, a road accident near the village killed 11 people from the military parachuting team of Czechoslovakia and the Bulgarian doctor and translator of the team - the bus in which they were traveling was hit by a train at an unguarded level crossing.

== Landmarks ==
There are excavations and discovered objects of some of the first settlers on the Bulgarian territory.
