= Fermata 2018 =

- Season 4
- Presented by: Ivan Hristov; Andrey Arnaudov
- No. of days: 101
- No. of castaways: 21
- Winner: Deyan "Dido" Kamenov
- Runner-up: Vania Stambolova
- Location: Gorna Dikanya, Bulgaria
- No. of episodes: 85

Release
- Original network: bTV
- Original release: 7 September – 16 December 2018

Season chronology
- ← Previous; Fermata 2017 Next → Fermata 2019

Fermata 2018 (The Farm 2018) is the fourth season of the Bulgarian version of The Farm. The season consists of 21 Bulgarians competing on the farm and live like it was a century prior. Each week, the head of the farm nominates one person to be in a duel, the nominee then chooses who they'll face off against in one of three challenges. The person who loses the duel is sent home but not before writing a letter delivered to the farm stating who the head of farm for the next week is. The winner is decided in a live finale via public voting where the winner receives a grand prize of 100,000 лв. The main twist this season is two of the contestants are twins competing as one and another contestant who's there as a special guest, helping the contestants for the first two weeks to help on the farm. The season premiered on 7 September 2018 and concluded on 16 December 2018 with a live finale where Deyan "Dido" Kamenov won in a public vote 73% - 27% against Vania Stambolova to win the grand prize and the title of Fermata 2018.

== Contestants ==
Contestant	Age	Residence	Entered	Exited	Status	Finish
Gergana Ilieva	31	Sofia	Day 1	Day 7	1st Evicted; Day 7	21st
Yordan Yovchev; Special Guest	45	Plovdiv	Day 1	Day 12	Finished Task; Day 12	20th
Iva Georgievi	27	Munich, Germany	Day 1	Day 14	2nd Evicted; Day 14	19th
Yoana Georgievi	27	Munich, Germany	Day 1	Day 14	2nd Evicted; Day 14	19th
Nina Gadeva	28	London, England	Day 1	Day 21	3rd Evicted; Day 21	18th
Tsvetan Angelov	38	Sofia	Day 1	Day 28	4th Evicted; Day 28	17th
Ivaylo Karanyotov	60	Sofia	Day 1	Day 41	Quit; Day 41	16th
Radilena Mitkova	25	Kula	Day 1	Day 42	6th Evicted; Day 42	15th
Kaloyan Zlatilov	21	Salt Lake City, United States	Day 1	Day 49	7th Evicted; Day 49	14th
Aleksandar Maslarov	38	Sofia	Day 1	Day 63	8th Evicted; Day 63	13th
Mitko Timchev	50	Varshets	Day 1	Day 70	9th Evicted; Day 70	12th
Liliya Semkova	24	Horodnie, Ukraine	Day 1	Day 77	10th Evicted; Day 77	11th
Simeon Tomov	27	Annecy, France	Day 1	Day 84	11th Evicted; Day 84	10th
Hristina Haralampieva	29	Sofia	Day 1	Day 35	5th Evicted; Day 35	9th
Hristina Haralampieva	29	Sofia	Day 49	Day 89	Medically evacuated Day 89	9th
Milena Zareva	43	Kyustendil	Day 1	Day 91	12th Evicted; Day 91	8th
Georgi Yankov	29	Sofia	Day 1	Day 95	13th Evicted; Day 95	7th
Aleksandra Penova	25	Pazardzhik	Day 1	Day 97	14th Evicted; Day 96	6th
Nuri Semerdjiev	46	Canterbury, England	Day 1	Day 99	15th Evicted; Day 99	5th
Roman Banev	26	Germany	Day 1	Day 100	16th Evicted; Day 100	4th
Rositsa Yoncheva	35	London, England	Day 1	Day 100	17th Evicted; Day 100	3rd
Vania Stambolova	34	Varna	Day 1	Day 101	Runner-up; Day 101	2nd
Deyan "Dido" Kamenov	34	Sofia	Day 1	Day 101	Winner; Day 101	1st

== The game ==
Week	Head of Farm	Butlers	1st Dueler	2nd Dueler	Evicted	Finish
1	Georgi	Aleksandar; Rositsa	Rositsa	Gergana	Gergana	1st Evicted; Day 7
2	Milena	Nuri; Radilena	Radilena	Iva & Yoana	Yordan	Finished Task; Day 12 (Note: Yordan finished his task on motivating the contestants and assisting them with the beginnings of the farm. Due to the completion of his task, he was allowed to leave the farm.)
2	Milena	Nuri; Radilena	Radilena	Iva & Yoana	Iva & Yoana	2nd Evicted; Day 14
3	Radilena	Dido; Nina	Nina	Vania	Nina	3rd Evicted; Day 21
4	Nuri	Hristina; Roman	Roman	Tsvetan	Tsvetan	4th Evicted; Day 28
5	Aleksandra	Georgi; Hristina	Hristina	Liliya	Hristina	5th Evicted; Day 35
6	Vania	Nuri; Rositsa	Rositsa	Radilena	Ivaylo	Quit; Day 41
6	Vania	Nuri; Rositsa	Rositsa	Radilena	Radilena	6th Evicted; Day 42
7	Aleksandar	Rositsa; Simeon	Simeon	Kaloyan	Kaloyan	7th Evicted; Day 49
8	Mitko	Rositsa; Simeon	Hristina; Iva; Radilena; Yoana		Hirstina	Returned to Farm; Day 56 (Note: Due to Ivaylo leaving the game, Iva, Hristina, Radilena and Yoana were given a second chance to renter the game.)
9	Hristina	Aleksandar; Milena	Aleksandar	Dido	Aleksandar	8th Evicted; Day 63
10	Nuri	Hristina; Mitko	Mitko	Simeon	Mitko	9th Evicted; Day 70
11	Rositsa	Aleksandra; Roman	Aleksandra	Liliya	Liliya	10th Evicted; Day 77
12	Georgi	Simeon; Vania	Simeon	Dido	Simeon	11th Evicted; Day 84
13	Dido	Georgi; Milena	Milena	Vania	Hristina	Medically evacuated Day 89
13	Dido	Georgi; Milena	Milena	Vania	Milena	12th Evicted; Day 91
14	None		Georgi	Nuri	Georgi	13th Evicted; Day 95
14	None		Rositsa	Aleksandra	Aleksandra	14th Evicted; Day 97
14	None		Dido	Nuri	Nuri	15th Evicted; Day 99
15	Semi Final				Roman	16th Evicted; Day 100
15	Semi Final				Rositsa	17th Evicted; Day 100
15	Final Duel/Public Vote				Vania	Runner-up; Day 101
15	Final Duel/Public Vote				Dido	Winner; Day 101
