= Radomir Municipality =

- Municipality
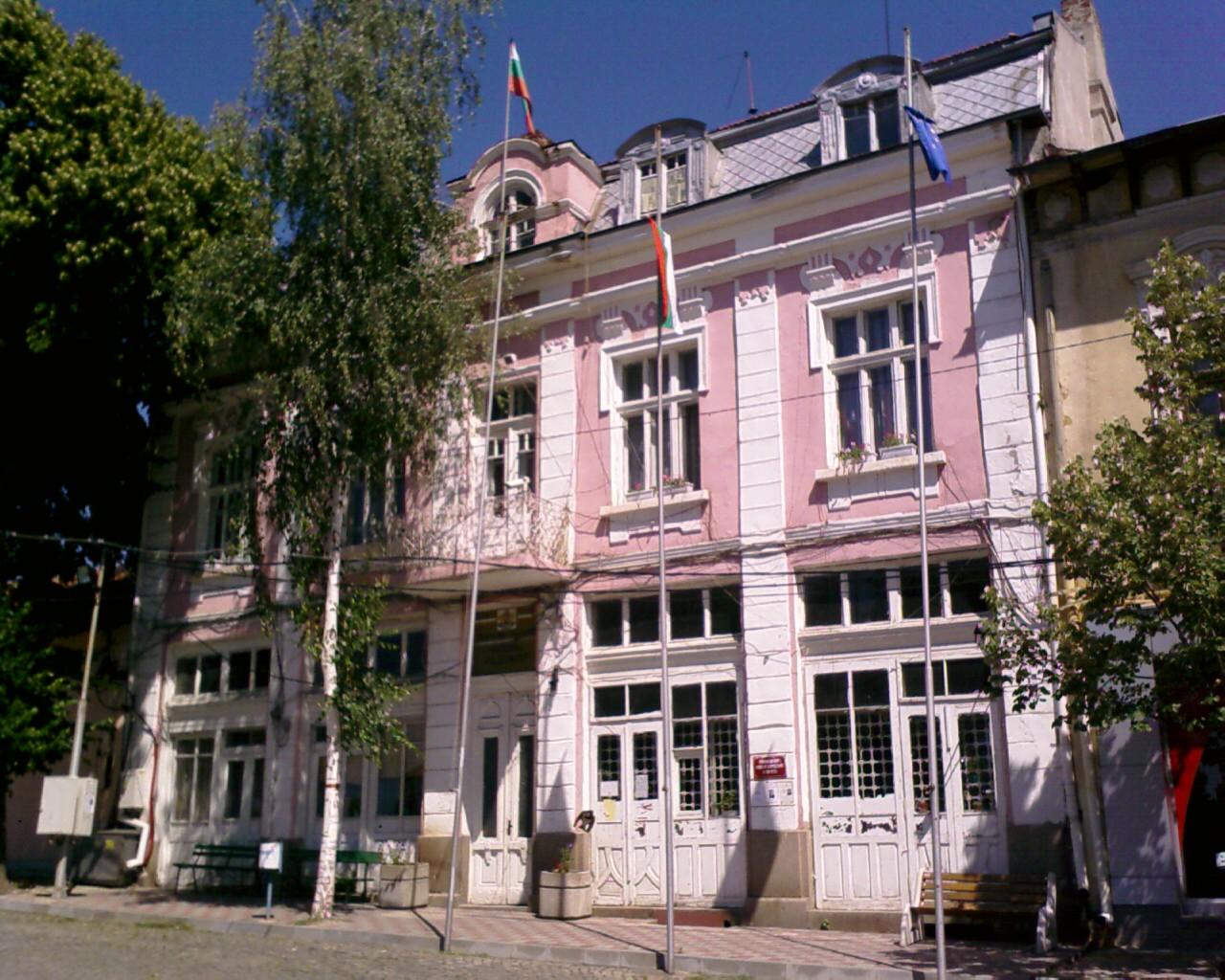
- The municipal headquarters

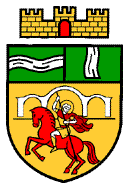
- Coat of arms

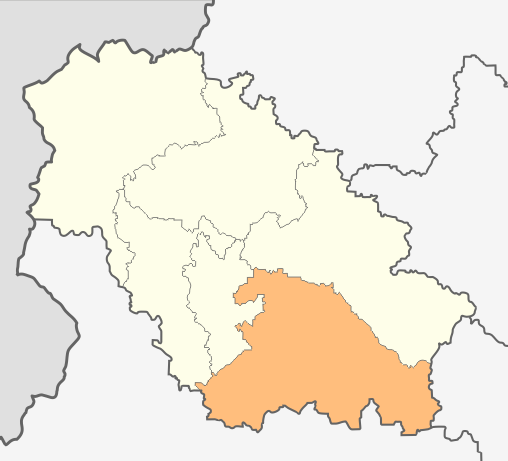
- Location of Radomir Municipality in Pernik Province

- Location of Radomir Municipality in Bulgaria
- Coordinates: 42°33′N 22°57′E
- Country: Bulgaria
- Province: Pernik Province
- Capital: Radomir

Area
  - Total: 540 km^{2} (210 sq mi)
- Elevation: 656 m (2,152 ft)

Population (2011)
  - Total: 20,896
  - Density: 39/km^{2} (100/sq mi)
- Postal code: 2400
- Area code: 0777

Radomir Municipality (Bulgarian: Община Радомир) is a municipality in the Pernik Province of Bulgaria.

== Demography ==
Ethnic composition of Radomir Municipality
1. Bulgarians (88.5%)
2. Sinti, Romani (4.27%)
3. No identification (6.94%)
4. Other (1.09%)

At the 2011 census, the population of Radomir was 20,896. Most of the inhabitants were Bulgarians (88.47%) with a minority of Sinti/Romani (4.27%). 6.94% of the population's ethnicity was unknown.

== Villages ==
In addition to the capital town of Radomir, there are 31 villages in the municipality:

- Baykalsko
- Belanitsa
- Boboratsi
- Bornarevo
- Chervena Mogila
- Chukovets
- Gorna Dikanya
- Galabnik
- Debeli lag
- Dolna Dikanya
- Dolni Rakovets
- Dragomirovo
- Dren
- Drugan
- Zhedna
- Jitusha
- Izvor
- Kasilag
- Klenovic
- Kondofrey
- Kopanitsa
- Kosharite
- Negovantsi
- Nikolaevo
- Potsurnentsi
- Priboy
- Radibosh
- Staro Selo
- Stefanovo
- Uglyartsi
- Vladimir
