= Debeli lag =

Debeli lag Дебели лаг
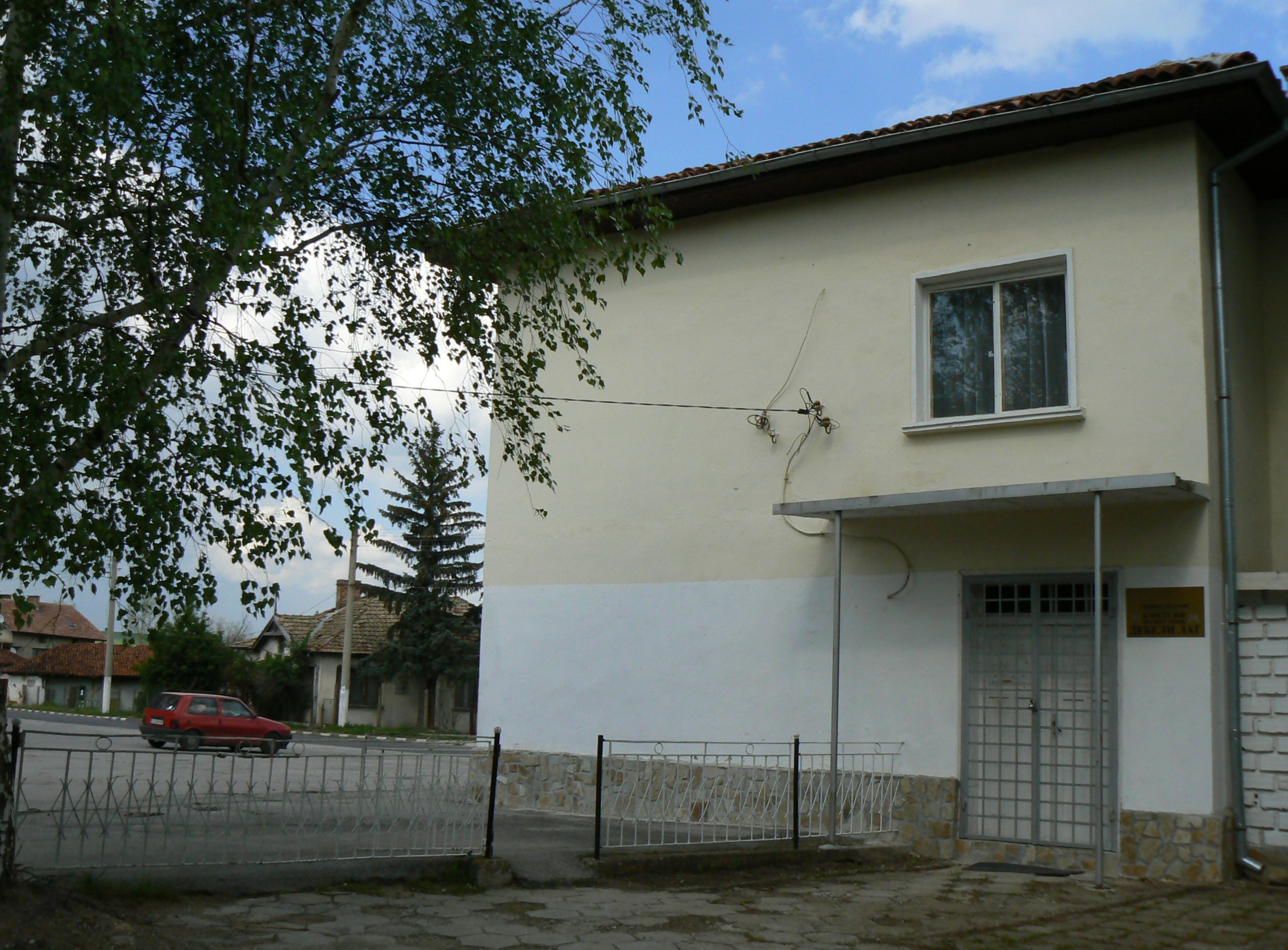
- Village hall

- Location of Debeli lag
- Coordinates: 42°27′N 22°52′E
- Country: Bulgaria
- Province (Oblast): Pernik
- Municipality (Obshtina): Radomir
- Established: 1576

Government
  - Mayor: Roza Krasteva

Area
  - Land: 19,091 km^{2} (7,371 sq mi)
- Elevation: 598 m (1,962 ft)

Population (2020)
  - Total: 192
- Time zone: UTC+2 (EET)
  - Summer (DST): UTC+3 (EEST)
- Postal Code: 2416
- License plate: PK

Debeli lag (Bulgarian: Дебели лаг) is a village in western Bulgaria. Its located in Pernik Province, Radomir Municipality.

== Geography ==
It is located near the Pchelina dam. The village also has a railway station.

== Landmarks ==
- St. Petka-Paraskeva Church, built in 1876 in memory of Vasil Levski, who was a frequent guest at the home of Atanas Doninski, a resident of the village.
- The Church of St. Peter and Paul, built by the Ampevi kin, has an unseen iconostasis, painted icons on all walls, three bells on the bell tower, and its courtyard with unique trees.
- Monument to those who fell during the wars of 1912-1913 and 1915-1918 and during the Second World War.

== Notable people ==
- Ljuben Brusev (1929 - 2007), Bulgarian athlete, coach and judge in classical wrestling
