= Mraka =

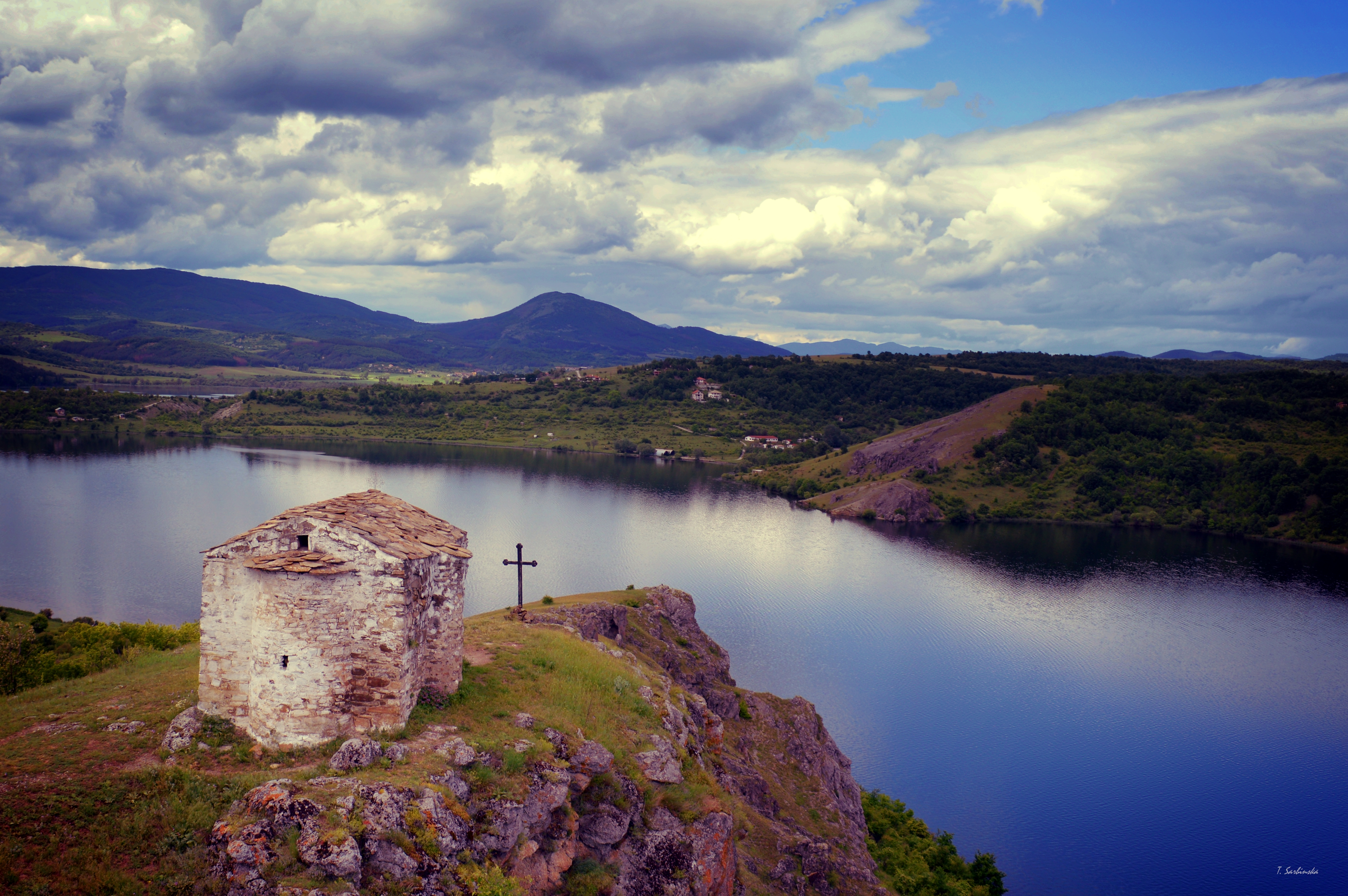
Saint John Letni Church, a 14th- or 15th-century church in the area

The Mraka (Bulgarian: Мрака) is a historical-geographical area in present-day Western Bulgaria, covering the northeastern slopes of the Konyavska Mountain and the Zemen mountain. On the other side is the Radomir plane, located respectively in the municipalities of Radomir, Kovachevtsi and Zemen.

The Mraka is separated from the neighboring region of Graovo, which occupies the Pernik-Breznik plane, by the mountain of Golo Bardo.

The earliest surviving manuscript that mentions this name is the Dragolj Code, written in 1259.

In Slavic languages, the word “mrak” or “мрак” means “darkness” or “gloom,” and the name Mraka is believed to come from this old linguistic root.
