= Zemen =

Zemen Земен
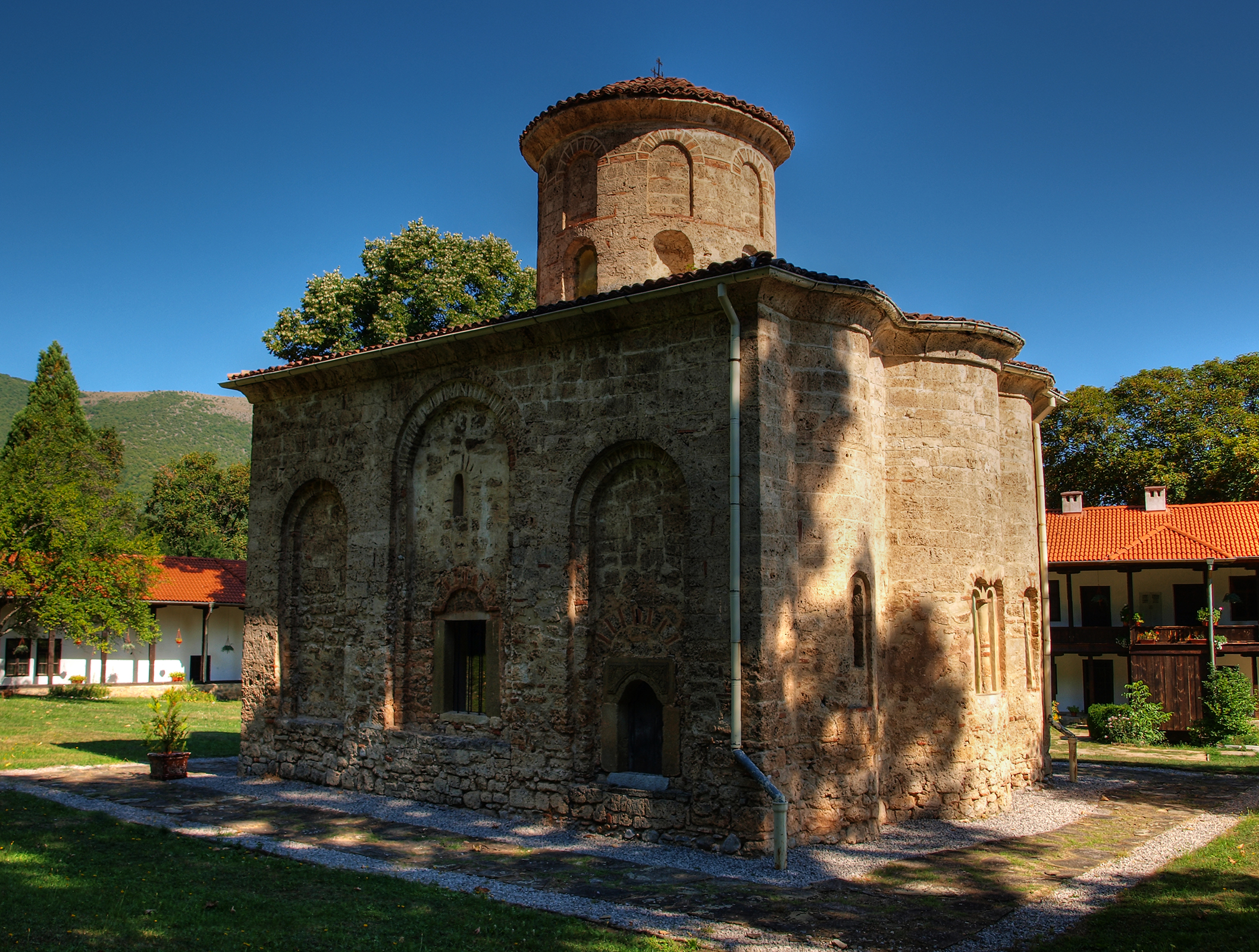
- The medieval church of the Zemen Monastery

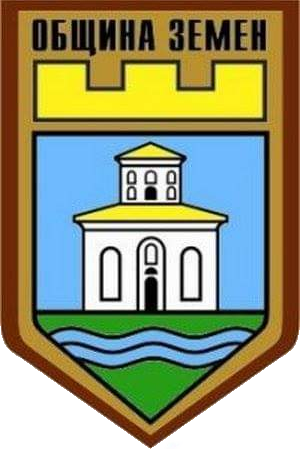
- Coat of arms

- Zemen
- Coordinates: 42°28′1″N 22°45′0″E
- Country: Bulgaria
- Province (Oblast): Pernik

Government
  - Mayor: Dimitar Sotirov
- Elevation: 593 m (1,946 ft)

Population (2020)
  - Total: 1,498
- Time zone: UTC+2 (EET)
  - Summer (DST): UTC+3 (EEST)
- Postal Code: 2440
- Area code: 07741

Zemen (Bulgarian: Земен [ˈzɛmɛn]) is a town in Pernik Province, western Bulgaria. Located near the Pchelina Reservoir on the banks of the Struma River, it is the administrative centre of Zemen Municipality.

== Geography ==
=== Location ===
Zemen is located in a mountainous region in southwestern Bulgaria. It is located 70 km from Sofia, almost halfway between Radomir and Kyustendil. It is located on both banks of the Struma River, in a small valley, which is a prelude to the Zemen Gorge, near the Pchelina Dam. Its old name was Belovo. The name Zemen was originally given only to the railway station built on his land, and in 1925 the village of Belovo was renamed the village of Zemen. The proponents of this name had in mind to revive and preserve the name of the medieval Zemlengrad, which existed not far from the place of the present city of Zemen in the gorge of Struma. Since 1974 Zemen has been declared a city and is now the territorial-administrative centre of the Zemen municipality of Pernik region.

=== Climate ===
In Zemen the climate is humid-continental (Dfb), and the mountains determine the climate with a mountainous character. Temperature inversions also occur.

== History ==
=== Antiquity ===
In the second half of the second millennium BC. Thracians from the Peoni, Agriani and Dentheletae tribes settled in the lands of the middle course of the Struma River. The Dentheletae inhabit the lands in the Kyustendil region. The Ileans founded the city of Alea [Ælea] and remained until the arrival of the Romans. Around 429 BC. the ileas are subordinated to the Odrysian king Sitalces (440 - 424 BC). After his death, the Lei entered into an alliance with the stronger neighboring Thracian tribes Agriani and Peoni. The Thracian tribe Lei settled in the agricultural lands in V BC. and remained until the coming of the Romans. Evidence of the presence of Thracian tribes in the Zemen region are finds of coins, votive tablets of Thracian horsemen, jewelry and remains of pottery / marble slabs of the daughter of the Thracian military leader Mucatralis, votive plaque depicting the Thracian goddess Bendis, ancient Mitra et al. Until the age of 45, the lands of the lands were part of the Thracian settlement system Dentelatika. After the fall of Thrace under Roman rule, the lands of the lands entered the boundaries of the large city centre Pautalia (today's Kyustendil). In Late Antiquity (II - IV century), the Romans created a settlement system within the boundaries of today's land. They were engaged in agriculture, winemaking and gold. There is a large number of Roman fortresses built in hard to reach places. Remains have been found in Roman forts - jars, aqueducts, Roman coins / of Emperor Justinian / and tiles dedicated to Roman deities. No written record of Roman settlements has been found. Slavs from the Strimonci tribe (Strumci) lived in the Zemen region. In a map of the Velbuzhd region from the Middle Ages on the territory of the town of Zemen is marked the settlement of Belovon.

=== Middle Ages ===
During the Middle Ages in the Struma Gorge, in the vestibule of Velbuzhd, the fortress Zemlengrad was built. Konstantin Jireček spoke about it for the first time in "Journey through Bulgaria". Describing in a unique way the beauties of the Zemen Gorge, Jireček tells about interesting historical events that took place in these lands:

Here a magnificent rocky amphitheater opened, on the slopes of which there were still numerous small caves. From the right bank a long stony protrusion protrudes to the southeast and at the end, about 100 m above the surface of the Struma, the stone foundations of a spacious town are peeled off on a hard-to-reach hammer. It is called Zemensko Kale, this whole impassable area in the narrows of Struma from Belovo to Rust is called by the population Zemen. This is Zemlengrad, more often mentioned in the South Slavic monuments from the XII-XIV century. To the west, the fortress wall descends very steeply to the river…

=== Ottoman rule ===
During the Ottoman rule, and especially after the advent of firearms, the Struma Gorge between Zemen and Razhdavitsa lost its former military-strategic significance, but its relatively good passability remained. The economic role expanded in this part of the Ottoman Empire - he became the most direct route for people and goods. The villagers of Belovo were obliged to assist the security posts in the gorge. The abandonment of the medieval church and the abandonment of the village cemetery around it suggest that the village may have been depopulated for some time, for reasons unknown at the time during the Ottoman rule. Then gradually new people came and settled here again. During the hajduk time in the mountains around Belovo, the hajduk companies of famous voivodes roamed in this area. Some of their names have come down to us, but there are many that history has forgotten. In the last years before the Liberation, an attempt was even made to overthrow the Turkish government, but it failed because the organizers were betrayed to the Turks.

The liberation of Bulgaria from Ottoman rule caused a sharp change in Kyustendil and its surroundings. The Turkish population, officials, military, merchants and police fled. The liberated Bulgarians no longer had anyone to deliver the products from the Turkish properties. Goods were no longer transported through the passage. The merchants passed along the newly built convenient road Kyustendil - Radomir through the Konyavska mountain. Thus, for almost three decades, Belovo found itself in great isolation and during that time no tangible changes took place in it. Tucked away at the foot of the surrounding mountains, cut off from busy roads, surrounded and separated by the turbulent waters of the Struma for most of the year, it continued its idyllic existence. Active economic relations with the surrounding and more remote villages were not maintained.

=== Modern history ===
The data from the first census in 1888 show that Belovo then had 681 inhabitants, which ranked it 13th among the 70 villages of Radomir district. In 1905 its population increased to 908 people. For the first time in 1882, during the territorial-administrative reform, Belovo became a municipal centre. It was only at the beginning of the century that more favorable conditions for the economic rise of Belovo began to be created. Then began the construction of the road to Radomir and the construction of the railway. the line Sofia - Gjueshevo.

In 1904 a Bulgarian-Turkish agreement was concluded, with which Bulgaria undertook to build a railway. the line to Gjueshevo until 1910, and Turkey from Gjueshevo to Kumanovo until 1912. In November 1904, the parliament approved a 100 million loan concluded with the Paris-Dutch Bank, part of which was to build the Radomir-Zemen-Kyustendil line. The Bulgarian side immediately began to implement the contract and in 1905 a tender was held for the construction of a railway. line Radomir - Gjueshevo, with a total length of 89 km. After signing the contract with the Bulgarian company that won the tender, intensive construction began immediately, for which many general workers were hired from the settlements through which the route of the line passes. The technical management, installation and other more complex work on the equipment were performed by Italian companies. The envisaged term for the construction of the line is 3 years - until August 1, 1909. Both Bulgarians and zemlantsi, as well as foreigners work for the construction of the line. Bridges and tunnels are built under the direction of mostly Italians. The head of the construction in this section was the Italian engineer Klinka, whom the locals adored. He was a young, energetic man, good-natured, cheerful and cordial, he quickly became friends with people, loved to communicate with them, and understood the Bulgarian language. He liked the local customs and traditions very much, he was actively involved in them - he sang Bulgarian songs and learned to play the rachenitsa. Klinka, together with his assistants and colleagues, are building nine tunnels in the rock masses of the towering mountain hills in the Zemen Gorge. The railway route follows a Turkish route from one time, along which there are now wonderful and lush forest beauties and the remains of medieval fortresses and towers, once present in the gorge and the Polsko-Skakavishki waterfall - the third highest in Bulgaria. An accident during the construction site killed several Italians, including engineer Klinka. In his memory, the square in the center of Zemen now bears his name.

On August 9, the railway section was officially opened by Prime Minister Alexander Malinov, ministers, engineers, journalists and representatives of local authorities and the population.

== Religion ==
The population of Zemen belongs entirely to Eastern Orthodoxy.

== Notable people ==
- Angel Velchev (1935 –), geographer, scientist
- Petar Petrov (1947 –), opera singer, bass

== Honours ==
- Zemen Knoll on Livingston Island in the South Shetland Islands, Antarctica is named after Zemen.
