= Chervena Mogila =

Village in Pernik Province, Bulgaria

Coordinates: 42°31′N 23°01′E

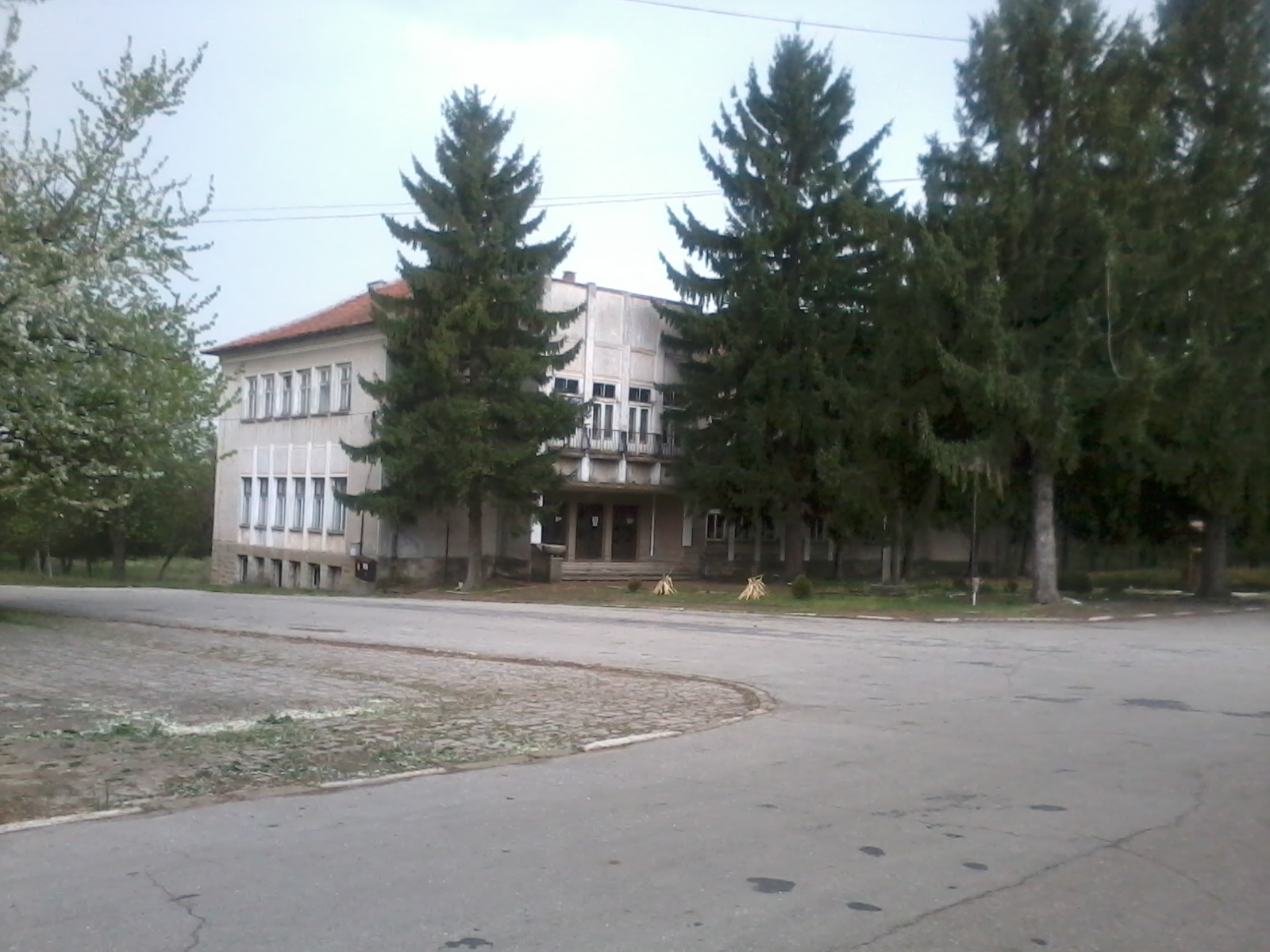
Centre of Chervena

Chervena Mogila (Bulgarian: Червена Могила / English translation: Red Hill) is a village located near the town of Radomir in Pernik Province, Bulgaria.

It is a host of an important power substation in the region and the Chervena Mogila Industrial Complex. The complex employed some 12,000 workers, but as of 2008 their number had dropped to 1,300. Most of the production is concentrated around components for nuclear power plants and atomic technology.
