= Svetoslav Minkov =

Bulgarian writer (1902–1966)

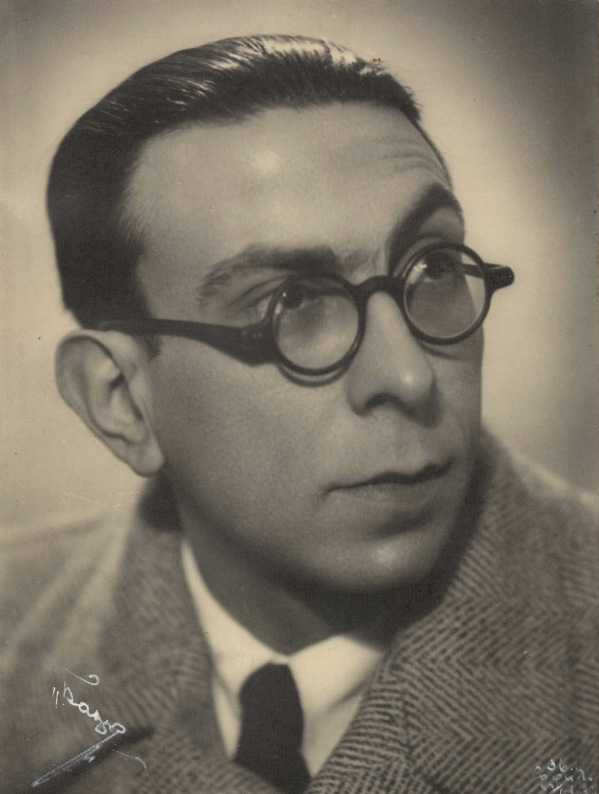
Svetoslav Minkov in 1936

Svetoslav Konstantinov Minkov (Bulgarian: Светослав Константинов Минков) (12 February 1902 – 22 November 1966) was a Bulgarian absurdist fiction writer.

== Biography ==
Minkov was born in Radomir in 1902 in a military family. His older brother Asen died in the Second Balkan War, while his other brother Ivan, a member of the Bulgarian Communist Party, committed suicide in 1925 to evade arrest after his involvement in the St. Nedelya Church bombing. Minkov received his primary education in Radomir, and graduated from a high school in the capital Sofia.

His sister Teodora introduced him to the Bulgarian literary circles of the 1920s. He published his first work - Newton's binomial in the "Bulgaran" magazine in 1920. He was later enrolled in a military college in Austria, where he studied the works of Goethe, Nietzsche, Edgar Allan Poe, Henrik Ibsen and the Russian classical authors. Minkov was known for his eccentric character and suffered from bizarre, paranoid phobias, pervasive obsessive thoughts and nightmares.

He studied at Sofia University for a brief period of time before departing for Munich in 1922. There he spent some of his best years, paying more attention to contacts with the local bohemians than to studies. He came back to his native country in 1923, and started working as a librarian for the SS. Cyril and Methodius National Library. Before 1942, Minkov visited a number of countries in Europe, Asia and South America. Between 1942 and 1943 he worked in the Bulgarian embassy in Tokyo. After 1944, he began working in a number of Communist-oriented newspapers. From 1954 to 1962 he was a chief editor at the "Bulgarski pisatel" printing house.

Minkov died in Sofia on November 22, 1966.

== Style ==
Svetoslav Minkov is considered a pioneer of Bulgarian science fiction. He was a unique figure in Bulgarian literature – his talent and style were largely isolated from the local literary tendencies of the 1920s and 1930s, and he had no followers.

His works primarily concern the loss of identity in the technocratic world, social uniformity under the influence of technology, the uncertainty of morality and values and the existential aspects of boredom. Minkov vividly expresses his ideas by means of parody, diabolism, sarcasm and absurdism.

He also wrote numerous tales for children, studies on Japanese culture, and translated the tales of Scheherazade into Bulgarian.

== Selected works ==
- The Blue Chrysanthemum, 1922
- Clock, 1924
- Firebird, 1927
- Shadow play, 1928
- The House at the Last Lantern, 1931
- Automatons, 1932
- Heart in a Cardboard Box, 1933
- The Lady With the X-Ray Eyes, 1934
- Madrid is On Fire, 1936
- Tales in a Hedgehog Skin, 1936
- Guest, 1938
- The Iron House, 1941
- Youth of the Ape, 1942
- Empire of Starvation, 1950
- Panopticum, 1966

== See also ==
- Geo Milev, another Bulgarian author and representative of Diabolism
