= Baykalsko =

Village in Radomir Municipality, Bulgaria

Coordinates: 42°24′N 22°50′E

Baykalsko or Baikalsko (Bulgarian: Байкалско) is a village in Radomir Municipality, Pernik Province, Southwest Bulgaria. Population: 75 (as of January 1, 2007). It is named after Lake Baikal, Russia.

Until 13 July 1951, Baykalsko was named Chokl'ovo.

== Honours ==
Baykal Point on Brabant Island, Antarctica is named after the village.
