= Kovachevtsi, Pernik Province =

Kovachevtsi Ковачевци
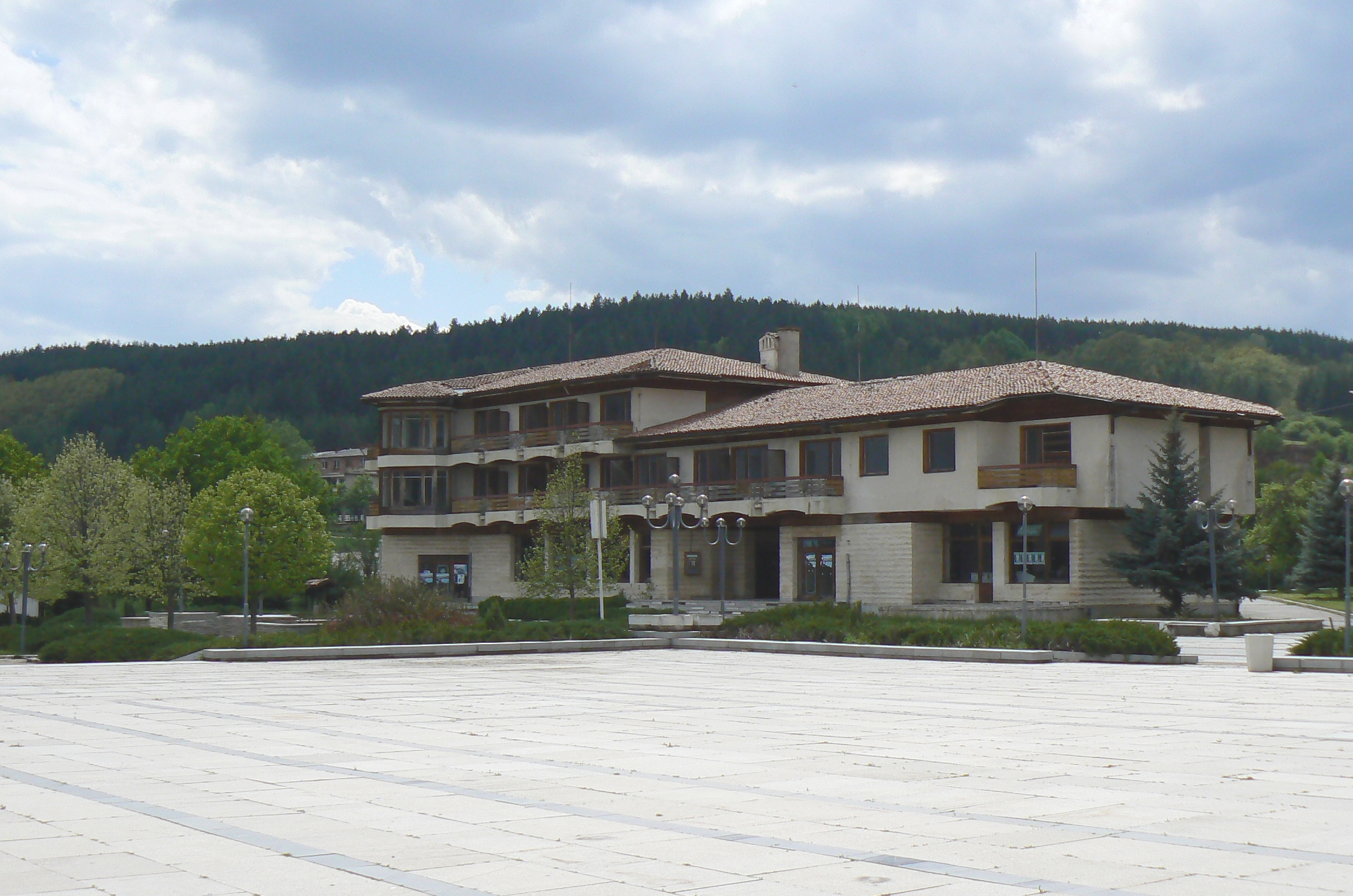

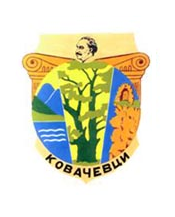
- Coat of arms

- Location of Kovachevtsi
- Coordinates: 42°33′N 22°49′E
- Country: Bulgaria
- Province (Oblast): Pernik
- Municipality: Kovachevtsi Municipality

Government
  - Mayor: Vasil Stanimirov

Population (2020)
  - Total: 363
- Time zone: UTC+2 (EET)
  - Summer (DST): UTC+3 (EEST)
- Postal Code: 2450
- Area code: 07727

Kovachevtsi (Bulgarian: Ковачевци, pronounced [koˈvat͡ʃɛft͡si]; also transliterated Kovačevci) is a village in western Bulgaria, part of Pernik Province. It is the administrative centre of Kovachevtsi Municipality, which lies in the western part of Pernik Province.

== Geography ==
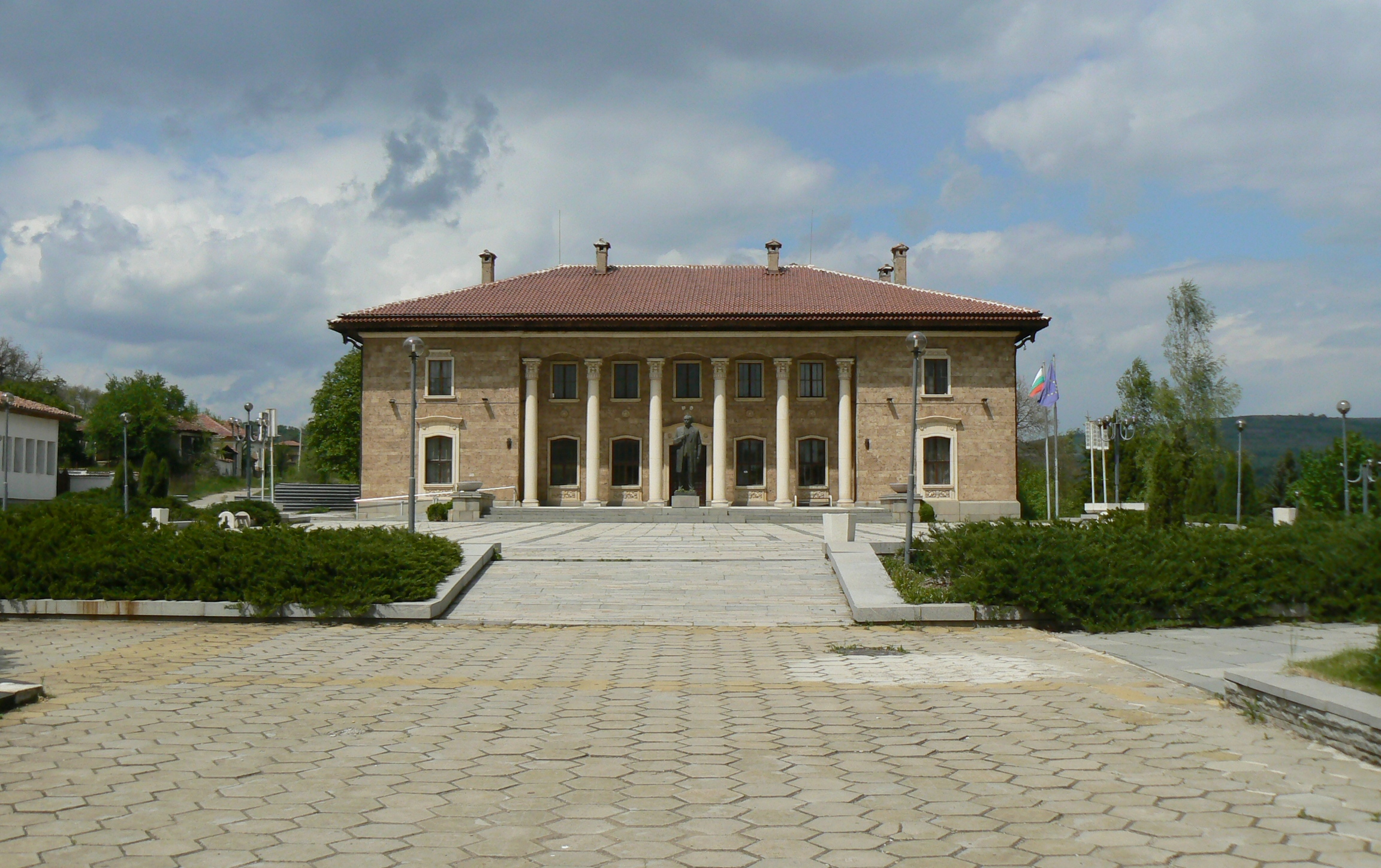
Georgi Dimitrov Memorial House in Kovachevtsi

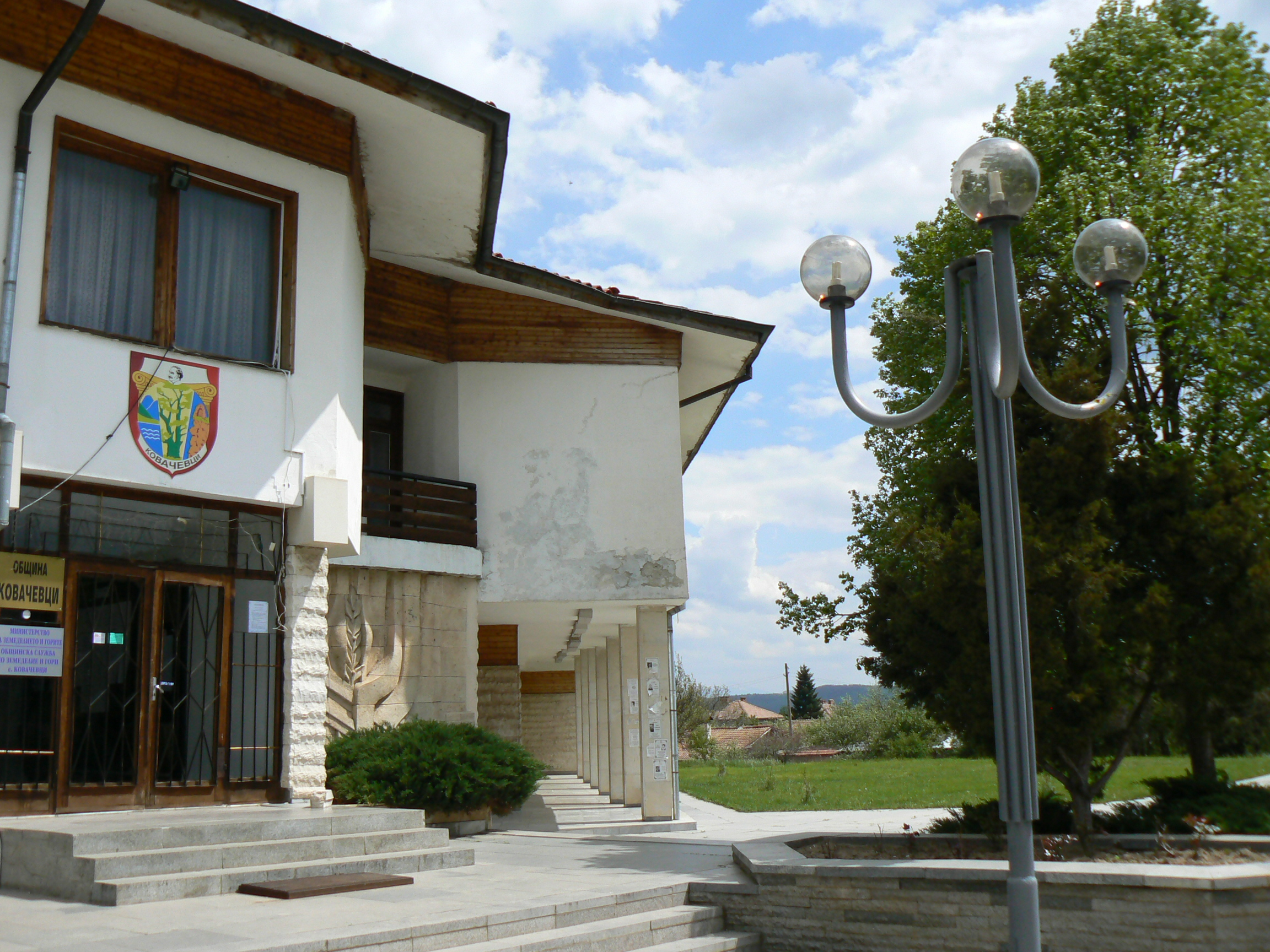
The municipal hall of Kovachevtsi

Kovachevtsi lies 25 kilometres southwest of Pernik and 55 kilometres southwest of Sofia. The village was first mentioned in Ottoman tax registers of 1576 as Kovachovcha; later on, its continuous existence was confirmed by western travelers such as Ami Boué and Felix Philipp Kanitz. The name is derived from the Bulgarian word for blacksmith, kovach (ковач), either as a nickname of its residents or because it was founded by a blacksmith.

== History ==
It is not known when the village of Kovachevtsi appeared. Its existence is judged by some archaeological finds, which reveal that in this area there was life at the beginning of our era. Remains of ancient buildings were discovered during the construction of the Pchelina Reservoir. An ancient villa - rustic is registered along the river Struma. Thick walls of crushed stone with mortar solder were discovered on an area of about 20 decares during the cultivation of the land. In the area of the village, in the area of Chukleto, there are remains of an ancient necropolis. Single burials and 3 tombs have been found in the burial mound. The proximity of the two sites - the ancient necropolis and the villa in the Padina neighborhood, as well as their common features, reveal their connections and say that they were used simultaneously. The name of the village is attested in writing in the Turkish tax registers in 1576 in the form of Kovachovha. It can be assumed that it is related to the blacksmith's trade of an unknown genus from this area. Like many other Bulgarian villages, Kovachevtsi has its own legend, which seeks a connection with the past. The old people say that during the Ottoman rule a large part of the village and the properties around it were owned by a rich Bulgarian blacksmith. His house was located in the Kovacheva Padina neighborhood near the village of Rakilovtsi. The blacksmith had a mill on the river Svetlya to today's Lyashkova neighbourhood. The Turks looked at the rich gjaurin with undisguised dislike and found a way to slander him. Accused by them, the blacksmith fell behind the bars of the Sofia dungeon. An influential Turk from Constantinople, who bought cattle from him, pulled him out. He freed him, but in return the blacksmith had to sell him all his lands around the river.

Kovachevtsi's population took part in the Bulgarian struggle for liberation from Ottoman rule, and the village was razed several times by Ottoman forces (1806) and bashi-bazouk detachments (1850). The village was liberated in January 1878 by the band of Ilyo Voyvoda. After the liberation, it was also visited by the Minister of Education, Konstantin Josef Jireček.

A notable native is Bulgarian Communist leader Georgi Dimitrov (1882–1949), whose parents were refugees from the Pirin region, which was left under Ottoman rule until the Balkan Wars. Dimitrov's influence contributed to the development of the village: roads were reconstructed, a memorial house dedicated to the leader was built, his birth house was renovated, a memorial park was organized.

== Notable people ==
- Georgi Dimitrov (1882 – 1949), first communist leader of Bulgaria, leader of Comintern from 1935 to 1943
