= Gorna Dikanya =

Coordinates: 42.4167°N 23.1833°E

Gorna Dikanya (Bulgarian: Горна Диканя) is a village in Radomir Municipality, Pernik Province, Bulgaria.

== Geography ==
Gorna Dikanya is located in a mountainous area at an altitude of 900 metres. It covers an area of 35 km^{2}. The village is located at the foot of the western slopes of Verila mountain. The distance from the village to the capital Sofia is 45 km, to the town of Dupnica - 20 km, to Radomir -20 km and the distance to Pernik is 25 km. The nearest villages are Dolna Dikanya, situated at 2 km west, and Dren, situated 6 km to the south. The lake near the village offers good opportunities for fishing and swimming.

== History ==
In late Antiquity in the village of Gorna Dikanya in the area Chukata there was a fortress, walls from which have been partly preserved to date. The fortress covered an area of about 4-5 dk and was built of stone and mortar. Outside the castle, there were many doliа. In the area Balinitsa, a late Antiquity necropolis was discovered as well as two brick tombs, and other single burials. In the area Gradishte, another ancient fortress existed, which is thought to have been related to the nearby ore mines. In and around the village of Gorna Dikanya, there are many medieval sacred stones, most often found in the ruins of churches.

The most ancient settlements in the area of Radomir are the town of Radomir, Dolna and Gorna Dikanya, Drugan, Dren, Zhedna, Kondofrey and Vurba. They all experienced the transitions in the early Turkish conquest in 14th century.

In the Turkish defters of 1572 there are records of abandoned smithshops in Dren and Gorna Dikanya and of migrants from three villages in the Sofia region who worked the fields of Gorna Dikanya.

== Other ==
The name of the town derives from the Turkish word `diken` - agricultural equipment for threshing.

There are five fairs a year: the village fair is on Ascension Thursday, fair of church, fair of The St. Ilia chapel, fair of monastery and the Hunters Fair.
