= The Lady with the X-Ray Eyes =

1934 novel by Svetoslav Minkov

The Lady With the X-Ray Eyes
- Author: Svetoslav Minkov
- Original title: Дамата с рентгеновите очи
- Language: Bulgarian
- Genre: science fiction, absurdism
- Publication date: 1934
- Publication place: Bulgaria
- English publication date: 1965
- Media type: hardcover

The Lady With the X-Ray Eyes (Bulgarian: Дамата с рентгеновите очи) is an absurdist fiction novel by Bulgarian writer Svetoslav Minkov, first published in Germany in 1934. It contains many sarcastic, parodic, diabolic and absurdist elements concerning the superficial nature of modern society. With this work Minkov laid the foundations of Bulgarian science fiction.

== Title ==
The title is composed of two principal elements: the word "lady" (дама, "dama"), which in Bulgarian can signify both a dame and a woman in line with the fashion trends of her time. X-ray photography was rapidly advancing in the 1930s, and the use of the term can provoke a scientific interest and demonstrates how science can also become a tool of imposing superficiality.

== Plot ==
Mimi Trompeeva is a young woman who suffers from severe strabismus. She decides to treat her condition by visiting a "beautification institute" headed by Chezario Galfone, a brilliant surgeon capable of turning "even the most disgusting freak into an angel". He manages to cure her crossed eyes, but also gives her the ability to see through materials, including inside people's bodies.

However, Mimi does not use her new gift for good - instead, she begins to seek the physically perfect male, without regard for intellect or talent. The story follows Mimi's evolution into a slave of her own looks and social environment - a hollow person whose feelings of love are a mere infatuation with the trends of the modern era.

== Publishing ==
The Lady With the X-Ray Eyes was first published in series in the German magazine Projektor in 1934. It was translated in Polish in 1960.

Its first English edition appeared in 1965, translated by the Moscow Foreign Languages Press.
