= Kozlets =

- Village
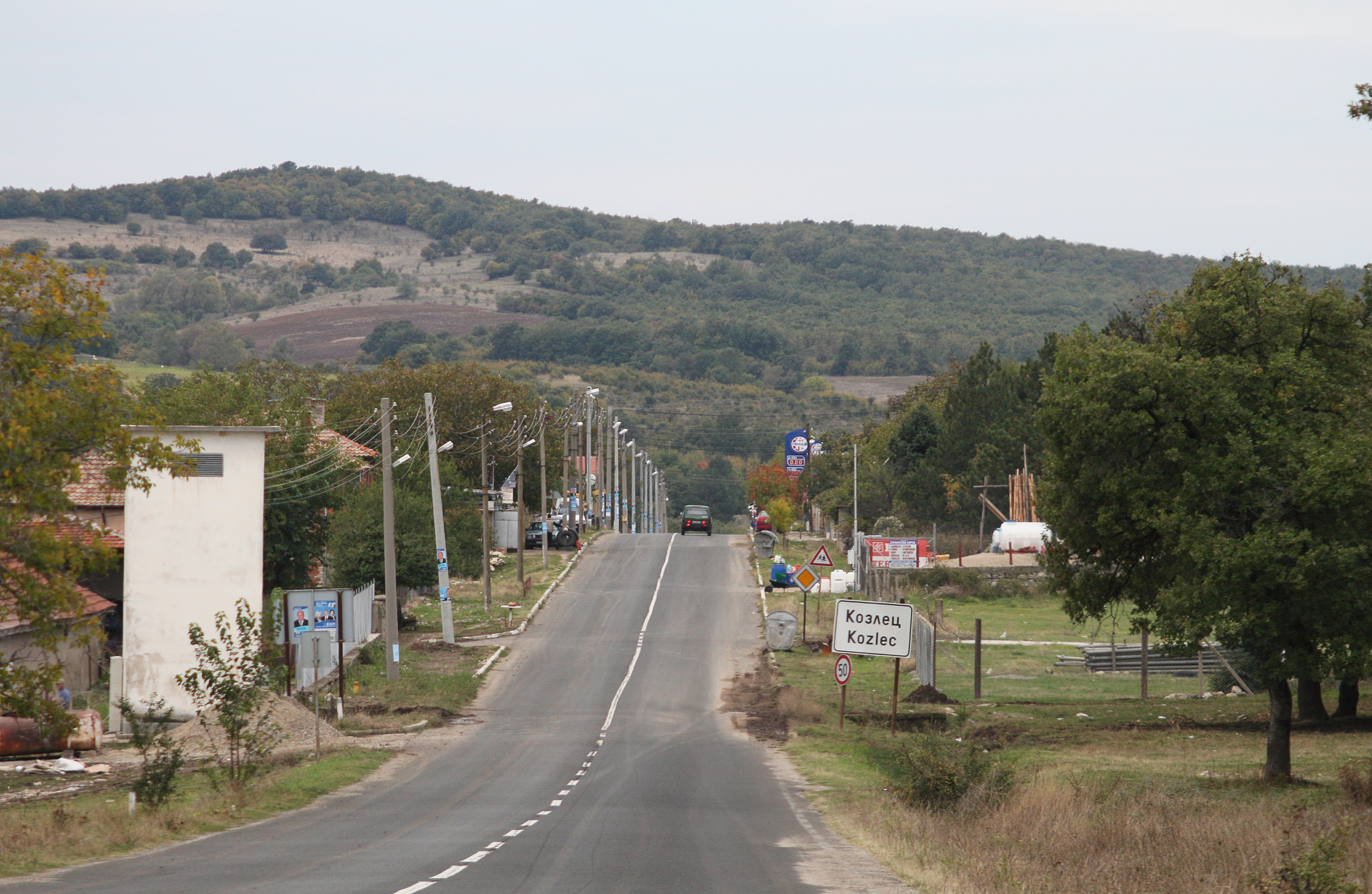
- Road sign in Kozlets

- Location within Bulgaria
- Coordinates: 41°50′N 25°28′E
- Country: Bulgaria
- Province: Haskovo Province
- Municipality: Haskovo
- Time zone: UTC+2 (EET)
  - Summer (DST): UTC+3 (EEST)

Kozlets is a village in the municipality of Haskovo, in Haskovo Province, in southern Bulgaria.

This village once belonged to the Hasköylü Ağalık, (Agaluk of Haskovo)
