= Radomir (town) =

Radomir Радомир
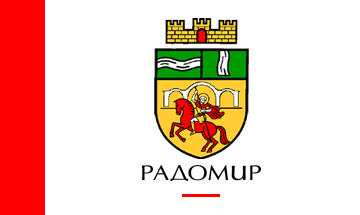
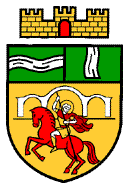
- Flag Coat of arms

- Location of Radomir in Bulgaria
- Coordinates: 42°33′N 22°57′E
- Country: Bulgaria
- Province (Oblast): Pernik
- Municipality: Radomir Municipality

Government
  - Mayor: Kiril Stoev
- Elevation: 764 m (2,507 ft)

Population (2024)
  - Total: 12,975
- Time zone: UTC+2 (EET)
  - Summer (DST): UTC+3 (EEST)
- Postal Code: 2400
- Area code: 0777
- License plate: PK

Radomir (Bulgarian: Радомир [ˈradomir]) is a town in the Radomir Municipality in the Pernik Province of Bulgaria.

== Geography ==
The town of Radomir is located at 764 meters above sea level in the Radomir valley, at the foot of Mount Golo Bardo. It is the center of the historical-geographical region of Mraka. The climate is humid-continental (Dfb).

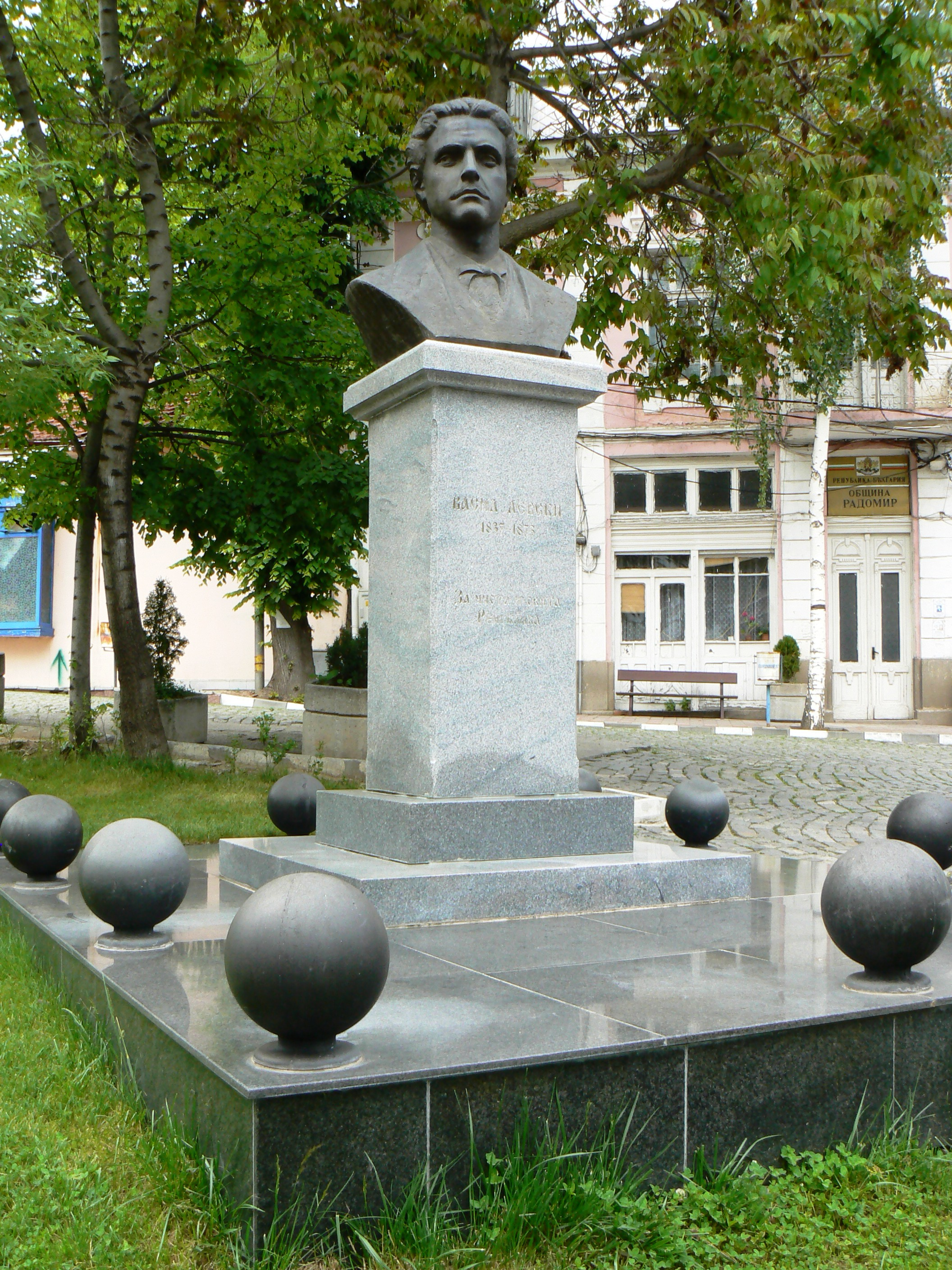
Monument of Vasil Levski

== History ==
The town was first mentioned in a 15th-century source as Uradmur. The current form appears for the first time in a source from 1488. The name is derived directly from the personal name Radomir or its adjectival form.

Not many names of priests and clergymen have been preserved in the history of the small town, but it is a fact that the Radomir valley was defended in the Christian spirit even after the fall of Bulgaria under Ottoman rule at the end of the 14th century. In 1418 a wave of discontent broke out in the vicinity of Radomir against the heavy taxes imposed by the Ottoman rulers. At that time the population did not exceed 6-7 thousand people in the whole valley, but it gave good handicrafts. The locals were mostly farmers and stockbreeders, but the craft went hand in hand with them. Very famous were the so-called "katzars", who produced barrels known as far as the Aegean. In the village of Dren there were woodcarvers incomparable in mastery. 1831 Ottoman population statistics show that 41% of the Christians in the kaza of Radomir, which included Pernik Province, were non-taxpayers and 82% of Christians were recorded as middle-class.

The population has a vigilant national consciousness. The first schools in Radomir were established by people who devoted themselves to worship. One of the prominent personalities during the national revival was Archimandrite Zinovii Poppetrov, who developed his vigilant activity in this area.

In 1918, Bulgaria was ruled by Ferdinand of Bulgaria, under whom Aleksandar Stamboliyski had been imprisoned for opposing Bulgaria's participation in the Balkan War and its alliance with the Central Powers in World War I. When in September the Allied forces broke into Bulgaria, Ferdinand agreed to release Stamboliyski in return for a promise to help restore order in the military. However, Stamboliyski instead aligned himself with the uprising and in Radomir proclaimed Bulgaria to be a republic. His supporters then attempted an attack on Sofia. The Radomir Rebellion was stopped when this force was defeated by Bulgarian and German tsarists, who also did not retain control for long as Bulgaria had signed an armistice with the Allies by the end of the month.

== Places of interest ==
The village of Baykalsko is a quiet and beautifully preserved natural settlement. The old church of Sveta Bogoroditsa, partially destroyed and rebuilt in the 19th century, has a recently restored, historic bell tower. A new cemetery bears the remains of generations on the opposite side of the village. The mayor's office and the post office are located across from the church of Bogoroditsa. The village is home to fewer elderly people and a growing population of seasonal visitors. Natural trails leading in and about nearby Konyavo Mountain, and the Choklyovo Marsh (Bulgarian: Чокльово блато, Choklyovo blato), are tourist attractions of Baykalsko. The old name of the village, Choklyovo, has not been restored to date.

The marsh of Choklyovo is a preserved area (Regional Environment and Waters Inspectorate — Sofia), as it is the natural habitat of rare bird species and a repository of therapeutic mud. The village overlooking the lake consists of small houses traditionally made of mud and sticks. There is some small-scale construction from the 1970s and 1980s and several newer villas. Legend has it that a medieval ruler, settled opposite the lake, issued a decree for all houses to face in his direction.

Baykalsko may be reached by bus from Sofia or Kyustendil, or by train via Zemen. Bed & breakfast accommodations are available by arrangement.

Radomir is the boza capital of Bulgaria, often called Bozenburg.

== Sport ==
The town is home to the FK Strumska Slava football team.

== Royalty ==
Radomir (1000–?) was also the name of a Bulgarian prince.

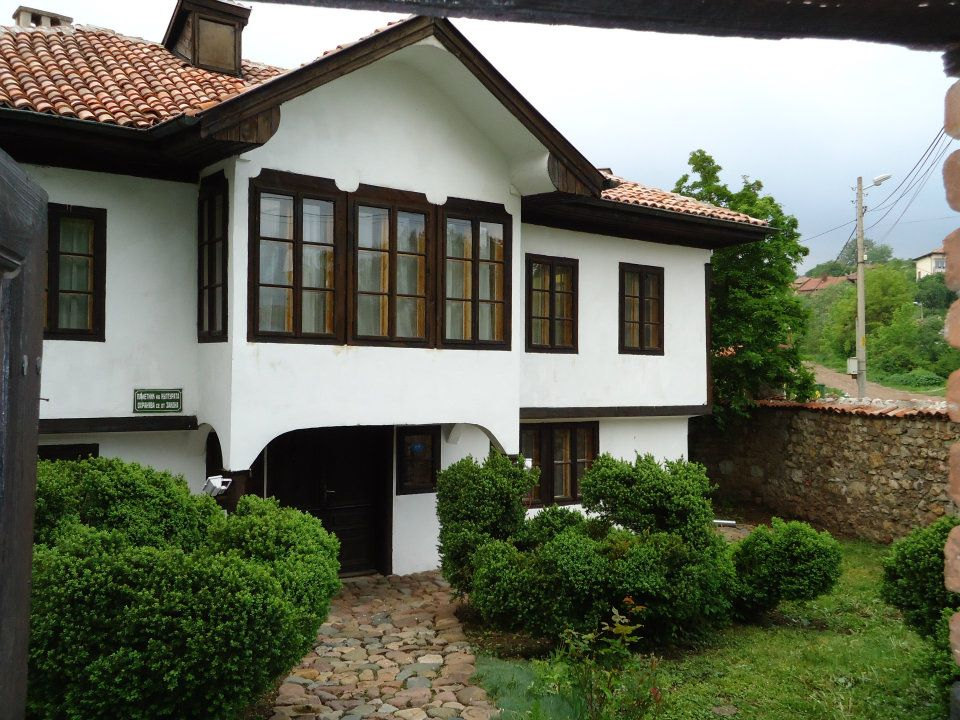
Stojov's house

Radomir was the surname of Gavril Radomir of Bulgaria (Bulgarian: Гаврил Радомир), who ruled Bulgaria from October 1014 to August 1015.

== Religion ==
The primary religion of the city's residents is Eastern Orthodox Christianity. The religion played a main role in the daily life of many residents of the city.

== Notable people ==
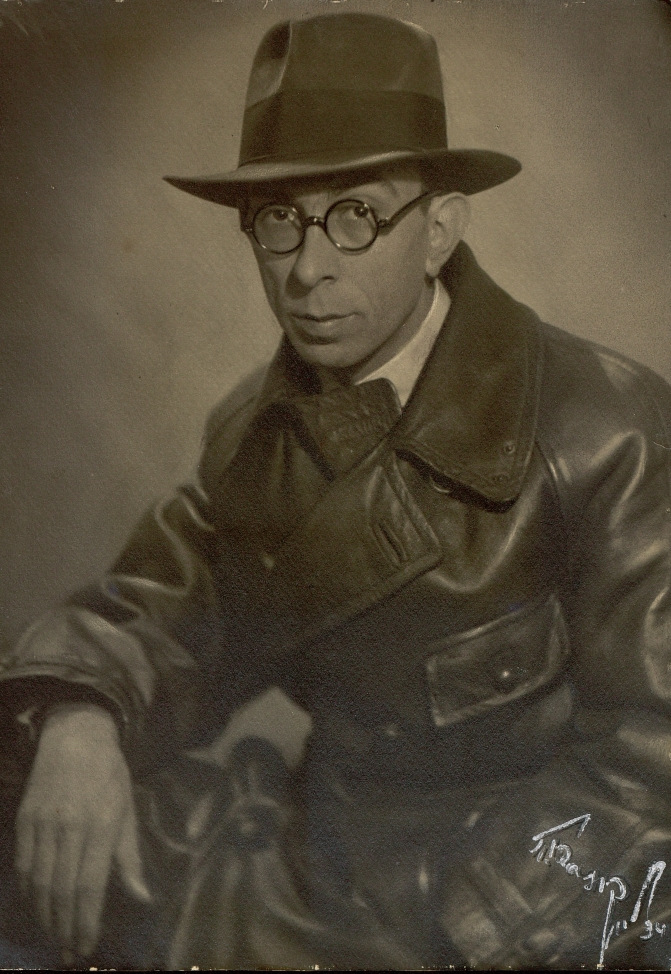
Svetoslav Minkov

=== Born in Radomir ===
- Bogomil Bonev (1957 –), politician
- Bogomil Simeonov (1922 – 1991), actor
- Svetoslav Minkov (1902 – 1966), writer
- Asen Daskalov (1899 – 1925), revolutionary
- Simeon Ananiev (1955 –), scientist
- Simeon Idakiev (1941 –), journalist and adventurer

=== Died in Radomir ===
- Georgi Madzharov (1870 – 1923), educationalist
- Zlatan Bojkiev (1822 – ?), revolutionary
- Kliment Hadzhov (1878 – 1948), educationalist

=== Connected with Radomir ===
- Zinovii Poppetrov (1838 – 1911), archimandrite

== Twin towns ==
- Hegyvidék, Hungary, since 2007

== Honour ==
Radomir Knoll on Livingston Island in the South Shetland Islands, Antarctica is named after Radomir.
