= Pernik Province =

Province in western Bulgaria

Coordinates: 42°35′N 23°0′E

Pernik Province Област Перник
- Province
- Tran Gorge near the border with Serbia

- Flag

- Location of Pernik Province in Bulgaria
- Country: Bulgaria
- Capital: Pernik
- Municipalities: 6

Government
  - Governor: Irena Sokolova

Area
  - Total: 2,390.5 km^{2} (923.0 sq mi)

Population (December 2022)
  - Total: 111,746
  - Density: 46.746/km^{2} (121.07/sq mi)
- Time zone: UTC+2 (EET)
  - Summer (DST): UTC+3 (EEST)
- License plate: PK
- Website: pk.government.bg

Pernik Province (Bulgarian: Област Перник) is a province in western Bulgaria, neighbouring Serbia. Its main city is Pernik, and other municipalities are Breznik, Kovachevtsi, Radomir, Tran, and Zemen.

Topographic map of Pernik Province

== Demographics ==
Historical population
Year	Pop.	±%
1946	172,389	—
1956	180,228	+4.5%
1965	180,883	+0.4%
1975	174,624	−3.5%
1985	174,044	−0.3%
1992	163,307	−6.2%
2001	149,832	−8.3%
2011	133,530	−10.9%
2021	114,162	−14.5%
Source: pop-stat.mashke.org

Pernik province had a population of 133,750 according to the 2011 census, of which 48.9% were male and 51.1% were female.

=== Ethnic groups ===
Ethnic groups in Pernik Province (2011 census)
Ethnic group	Percentage
Bulgarians	96.4%
Romani	2.8%
others and indefinable	0.7%

Total population (2011 census): 133 530

Ethnic groups (2011 census): Identified themselves: 125 422 persons:

- Bulgarians: 120 929 (96,42%)
- Romani: 3 560 (2,84%)
- Others and indefinable: 933 (0,74%)

Ethnic groups in the province according to 2001 census:

- Bulgarians: 145 642 (97.2%),
- Romani: 3 035 (2%)
- Others and indefinable: 1155 (0.8%).

=== Religion ===
Religious adherence in the province according to 2001 census:

Census 2001
religious adherence	population	%
Orthodox Christians	146 141	97.5%
Protestants	356	0.2%
Muslims	178	0.1%
Roman Catholics	92	0.1%
Other	496	0.3%
Religion not mentioned	2 569	1.7%
total	149 832	100%

== Economy ==
Industry is of vital importance for the economy of the province. Pernik is the major manufacturing centre, one of the largest in the country with the "Stomana" steel complex, heavy machinery (mining and industrial equipment), building materials, and textiles being the most important. There is an enormous plant for heavy machinery in Radomir which produces excavators and industrial equipment, but is currently not working at full capacity.

== See also ==
- Provinces of Bulgaria
- List of villages in Pernik Province
