= Marchaevo =

- Village
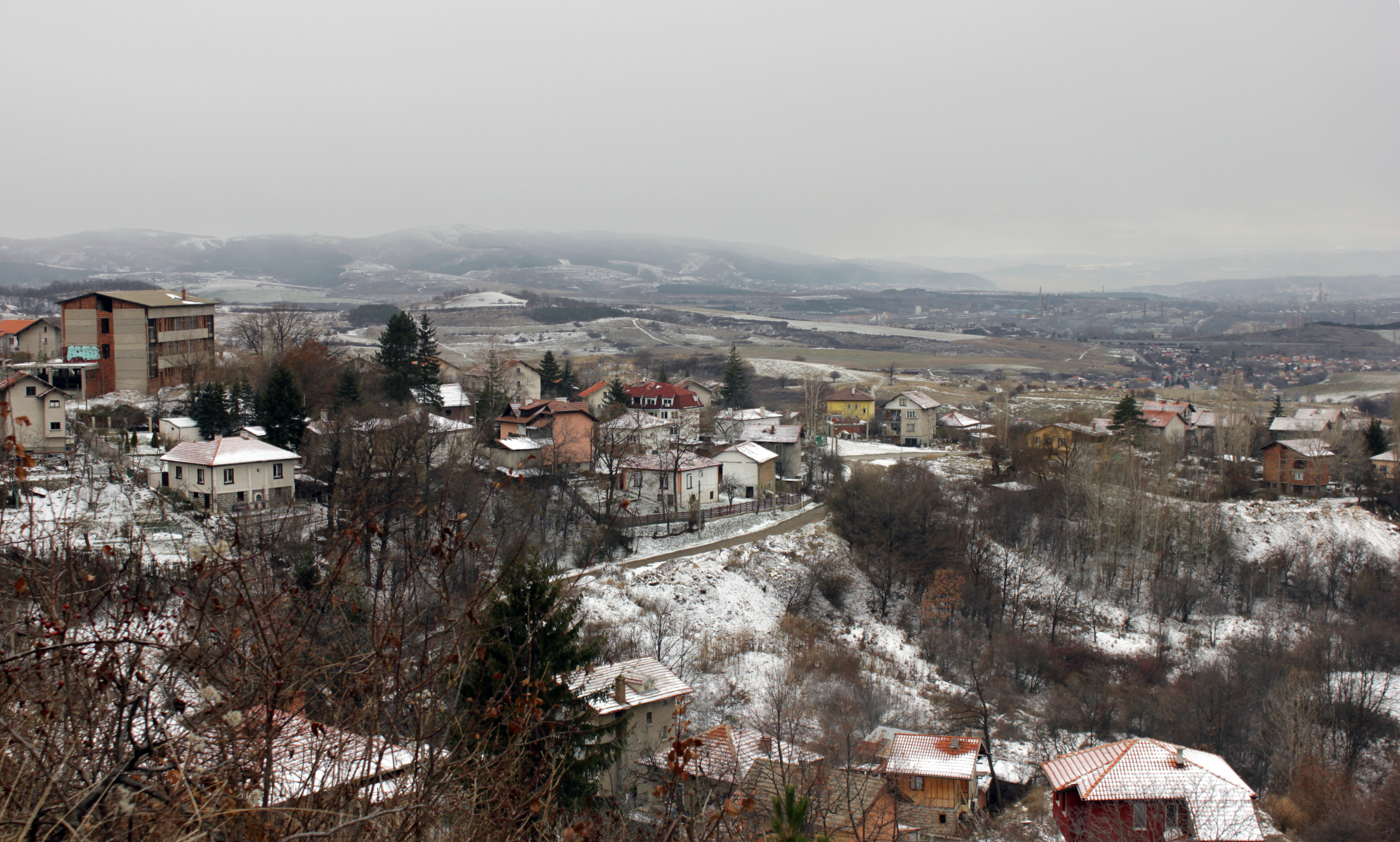

- Location within Bulgaria
- Coordinates: 42°35′58.28″N 23°10′13.18″E
- Country: Bulgaria
- Province: Sofia City
- Municipality: Stolichna Municipality
- Elevation: 1,303 m (4,275 ft)

Population (2024)
  - Total: 1,209
- Time zone: UTC+2 (EET)
  - Summer (DST): UTC+3 (EEST)
- Postal code: 1696

Marchaevo (Bulgarian: Мърчаево [mɐrˈt͡ʃaɛvo]) is a village in Vitosha district of the Bulgarian capital Sofia, located some 19 km southwest of the city center. As of 2024 it has 1,209 inhabitants.

== Geography ==
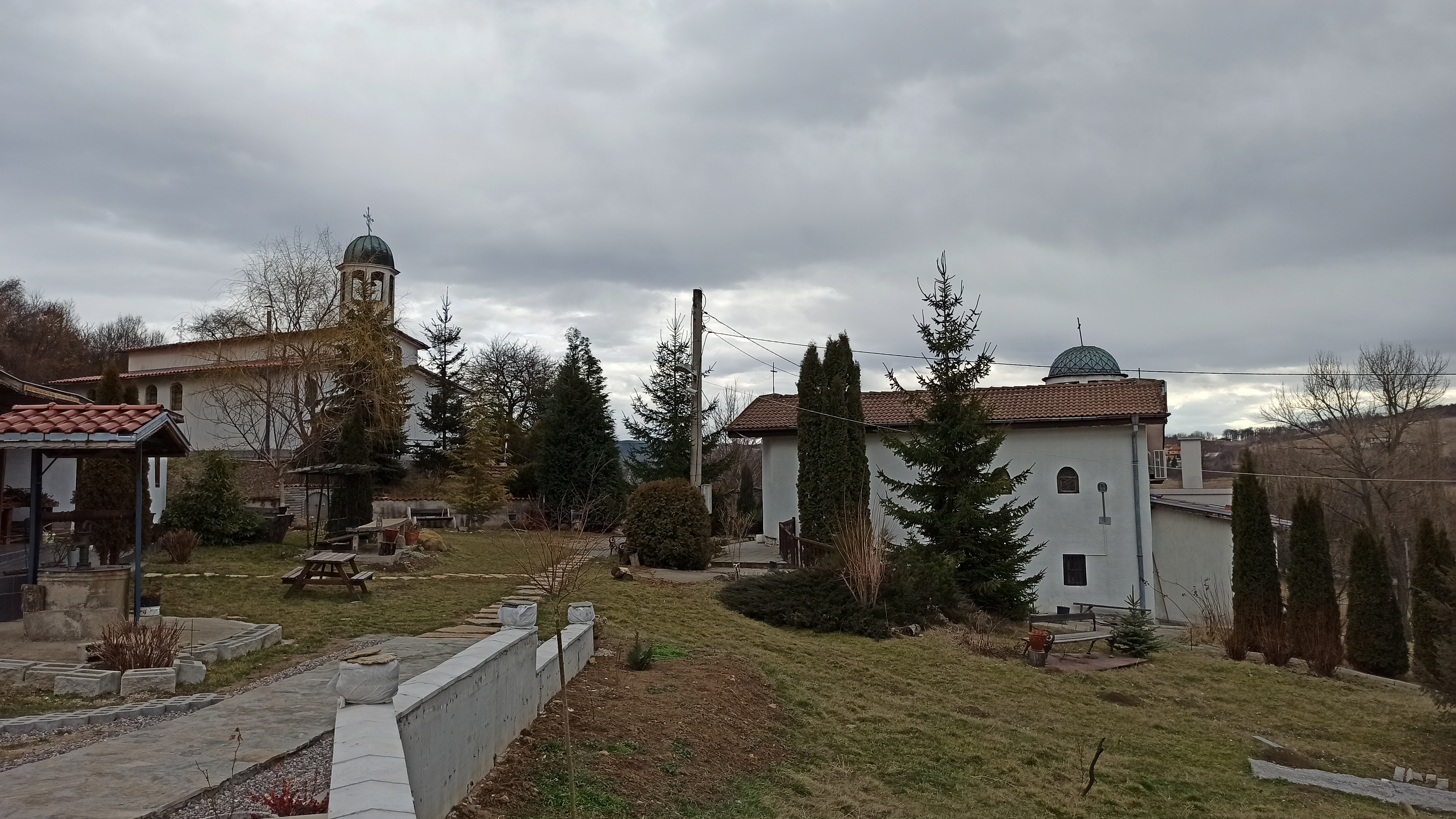
Marchaevo Monastery of Holy Trinity

The village is situated at an altitude of 1,303 m on the western foothills of the Vitosha mountain range, lying along the Vladaya Pass that separates Vitosha from the Lyulin mountain range further west. It falls within the continental climatic zone. The soils are brown forest and cinnamos forest.

Administratively, Marchaevo is part of the Vitosha district of Stolichna Municipality in the southwestern part of Sofia City Province, very close to the limits of Pernik Province. It has a territory of 12.177 km^{2}. The closest settlements are the villages of Vladaya to the northeast, Rudartsi and Kladnitsa to the south, and Dragichevo to the west.

== Transport ==
Marchaevo lies just south the first class I-6 road Gyueshevo–Sofia–Karlovo–Burgas in the section between Sofia and Pernik. A few kilometers to the west is a major junction between I-6 and the Struma motorway (A3). The railway line No. 5 Sofia–Blagoevgrad–Kulata runs in parallel with the I-6 road in that section; the closests railway stations are at the neighbouring villages of Vladaya and Dragichevo. Marchaevo is served by a bus line of the Sofia Public Transport.

== History and culture ==
The village was first mentioned in Ottoman documents from 1430. There are ruins of an ancient fortress in the vicinity of Marchaevo in the direction of Kladnitsa. There is a church dedicated to Saint George. Some 4 km from Marchaevo is the Monastery of St Petka, founded during the Second Bulgarian Empire, destroyed by the Ottomans and rebuilt in the early 20th century. The local cultural center, known in Bulgarian as a chitalishte, was founded in 1945.
