= Selishten Dol =

- Village
- Selishten Dol
- Location within Bulgaria
- Coordinates: 42.65607°N 22.91018°E
- Country: Bulgaria
- Province: Pernik Province
- Municipality: Pernik Municipality

Government
  - Mayor: Boyko Boyanov

Area
  - Total: 11.5 km^{2} (4.4 sq mi)
- Elevation: 731 m (2,398 ft)

Population
  - Total: 119
- Postal code: 2377
- Area code: 07755

Selishten Dol is a village in Southern Bulgaria, in Pernik Municipality, Pernik Province. Аccording to the 2020 Bulgarian census, Selishten Dol has a population of 119 people with a permanent address registration in the settlement.

== Geography ==
Selishten Dol village is in Municipality Pernik, 14 kilometers west of Pernik and 46 kilometers from Sofia, the capital of Bulgaria. The neighboring villages are Velkovtsi, Solitsa, Slakovtsi, Noevtsi, Yardzhilovtsi, and Plilula.

Selishten Dol lies in a continental climate area with a harsh winter and a warm summer. A river passes through the village until July, and during the summer dries up. The rain is less than the average for Bulgaria.

== History ==
The first written text that confirms the existence of the village in the Middle Ages dates back to 1576. The name of the village stems from a story that says that Selishten Dol burned down to the ground and was rebuilt on a lower location. Hence the name "Dol" which means down.

After the establishment of the mines in Pernik, a large portion of the male population from the village starts work there.

=== Buildings ===
- The local school was established in 1883 and used various houses of local villages until a school edifice was built in 1910.
- The local community hall and library "Hristo Botev" was built in 1928.

== Ethnicity ==
According to the Bulgarian population census in 2011.

	Number	Percentage(in %)
Total	146	100.00
Bulgarians	138	95
Turks	0	0
Romani	0	0
Others	0	0
Do not define themselves	0	0
Unanswered	8	5
