= Tsvetana Jermanova =

Bulgarian anarchist and labour camp survivor (1928–2024)

- Цветана Джерманова
- Born: Tsvetana Draganova Mileva; 20 March 1928; Leskovets, Sofia Province, Kingdom of Bulgaria
- Died: 19 February 2024 (aged 95)
- Movement: Anarchism in Bulgaria
- Spouse: Lyubomir Jermanov (m. 1948; died 2005)

Tsvetana Draganova Jermanova (Bulgarian: Цветана Драганова Джерманова, née Mileva; 20 March 1928 – 19 February 2024) was a Bulgarian anarchist who, during the 1940s and 1950s, was incarcerated in a number of forced labour camps in Communist Bulgaria. As a living survivor of the labour camps, her experiences were documented in her memoirs, published in 2011, and were the subject of a television documentary in 2017.

== Biography ==
=== Early life and education ===
Tsvetana was born on 20 March 1928 in the village of Leskovets into a family of five: her parents, Raina and Dragan Milev, and two brothers, Maxim and Vasil. She graduated from the Leskovets Primary School and the Batanovtsi Secondary School. From 1942 to 1946, she studied at the Pernik Girls' High School and after graduation she applied for a degree in Agronomy at Sofia University, but she was denied permission to enroll by the Fatherland Front. Instead, she enrolled at the Pernik's Mining Technical School, where she graduated in 1957, and later Pernik's Economic Technical School, where she graduated in 1966.

=== Anarchist activism and incarceration ===
She was first drawn to the ideas of anarchism in 1946, when she started meeting with young anarchists at the Mining Technical School. After she was refused enrollment at Sofia University, she organised a meeting of young anarchists from Southwestern Bulgaria in Kitka, near the Gigin Monastery. Young people from the villages of Leskovets and Kosacha gathered for the meeting; but the groups from Pernik, Radomir, and Sofia were stopped by policemen at Batanovtsi, and those from Begunovtsi by Breznik police.

She was arrested in a mass raid against Bulgarian anarchists on 16 December 1948, a few days before the 5th Congress of the Bulgarian Communist Party. She stayed in the cells of the State Security in Pernik for twenty days, after which she was incarcerated in a forced labour camp in Bosna. In December 1951, she was transferred to the "Shchurcheto" camp on Persin Island, where she was incarcerated until 20 April 1952.

=== Later life and memoirs ===
In 1948, she married Lyubomir Jermanov, who she had met during the anarchist meetings. They lived in Pernik and had two children, Elza and Ivo. From 1975 to 1976, her husband was exiled to the village of Okorsh and then forced to work in the Krastets coal mine near Gabrovo, due to his continued anarchist activism. Lyubomir Jermanov died in 2005 in Pernik.

In the 21st century, Jermanova decided to leave her testimony of her experiences in the labour camps in hope that history would never be repeated. In 2011, Tsvetana Jermanova's autobiography Memories of the Camps was published; and in 2017, Bulgarian National Television made the film Open Files that was dedicated to her incarceration in the Bosna and Belene concentration camps. To documentarian Katerina Vassileva, the documentary series was an important historical document, as "through Tsvetana's ... personal story, it seems to me that we can understand more about socialism, for example, than from a textbook. I think this is very valuable. That's my answer to why these stories are important." Jermanova's personal archive is stored in the Pernik State Archive. It consists of 20 archival items from 1923 to 2018.

Jermanova died on 19 February 2024, at the age of 95.

== Selected works ==
- Jermanova, Tsvetana (2011). Спомени от лагерите (PDF) (in Bulgarian). Farago Publishers. ISBN 978-954-2961-08-6.
