= Cerna Gora, Pernik Province =

Cerna Gora
- Village
- Cerna Gora
- Location within Bulgaria
- Coordinates: 42.603021°N 22.934646°E
- Country: Bulgaria
- Province: Pernik Province
- Municipality: Pernik Municipality

Government
  - Mayor: Dimitar Dimitrov

Area
  - Total: 16.078 km^{2} (6.208 sq mi)
- Elevation: 677 m (2,221 ft)

Population
  - Total: 271
- Postal code: 2340
- Area code: 07712

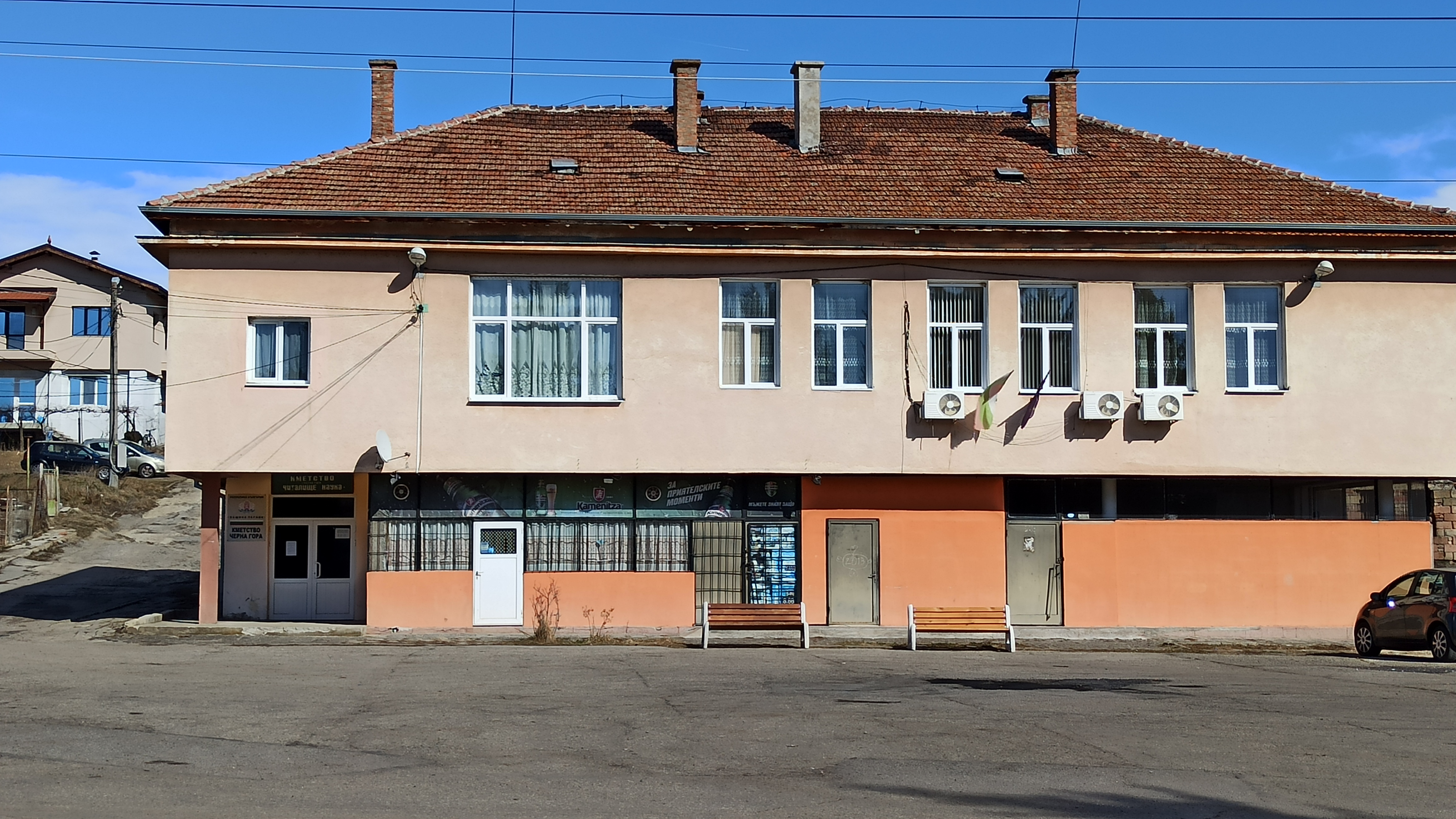
Town hall and community center of Cerna Gora

Cerna Gora is a village in Southern Bulgaria, in Pernik Municipality, Pernik Province. Аccording to the 2020 Bulgarian census, Bogdanovdol has a population of 271 people with a permanent address registration in the settlement.

== Geography and Culture ==
Bogdanovdol village is located in Southern Bulgaria. The climate of the village is continental. It lies on the borders of the Balkan Mountains.

The village is 12 kilometers west of Pernik, and 2 kilometers from Batanovtsi. The capital of Bulgaria, Sofia, is 39 kilometers northeast. It carries the same name as the mountain it lies in the summit of – Cerna Gora.

Nearby are the two tallest peaks of the mountain: Tumba (1158) and Vetrushka (1129).

== History and Infrastructure ==
The village was first created after Cerna Gora was separated from the town of Batanovtsi in the year 1991.

There is a community hall and a library in the village, alongside a grocery store and a café. The closest doctor, pharmacy, and school are located in Batanovtsi.

== Ethnicity ==
According to the Bulgarian census in 2011.

	Number	Percentage(in %)
Total	302	100.00
Bulgarians	295	97.68
Turks	0	0
Romani	0	0
Others	0	0
Do not define themselves	0	0
Unanswered	7	0.02
