= Lyulin =

Lyulin (Bulgarian: Люлин) may refer to:

- Lyulin Mountain, in western Bulgaria, after which most others are named
- Lyulin (municipality), municipality of Sofia
- Lyulin Metro Station, a Sofia Metro station.
- Lyulin motorway, motorway linking Sofia and Pernik
- Lyulin, Yambol Province, village in Yambol Province
- Lyulin, Pernik Province, village in Pernik Province
- Lyulin Peak, peak on Livingston Island, Antarctica

== See also ==
- Liulin (disambiguation)
