= Zidartsi =

- Village
- Zidartsi
- Location within Bulgaria
- Coordinates: 42.647792°N 22.956652°E
- Country: Bulgaria
- Province: Pernik Province
- Municipality: Pernik Municipality

Government
  - Mayor: Margarita Dimitrova

Area
  - Total: 3.694 km^{2} (1.426 sq mi)
- Elevation: 738 m (2,421 ft)

Population
  - Total: 87
- Postal code: 2358
- Area code: 07719

Zidartsi is a village in Southern Bulgaria. The village is located in Pernik Municipality, Pernik Province. Аccording to the numbers provided by the 2020 Bulgarian census, Zidartsi currently has a population of 87 people with a permanent address registration in the settlement.

== Geography ==
Zidartsi village is in Pernik municipality and lies 6 kilometers from the town Batanovtsi and 6 kilometers from the larger village Yardzhilovtsi. The village is located in the geographical area Graovo.

The first written record of the village dates back to 1606 in Ottoman records. The village was built over the remains of an abandoned Ottoman farm. According to these records in 1878 the village consisted of 7 houses.

Currently it is divided into 3 small neighborhoods, upper neighborhood (24 houses), Middle (7 houses), and lower (15 houses).

== Infrastructure ==
There is a supermarket in the village, while the nearest medical help is located at the nearest municipality. There is a new temple "Vsi Sveti" and a football club alongside a stadium.

The community hall and library "Vasil Levski" was built in 1975.

== Ethnicity ==
According to the Bulgarian population census in 2011.

	Number	Percentage(in %)
Total	80	100.00
Bulgarians	80	100
Turks	0	0
Romani	0	0
Others	0	0
Do not define themselves	0	0
Unanswered	0	0
