= Rasnik =

- Village
- Rasnik
- Location within Bulgaria
- Coordinates: 42.7203969°N 23.001607°E
- Country: Bulgaria
- Province: Pernik Province
- Municipality: Pernik Municipality

Government
  - Mayor: Valeriya Luybchova

Area
  - Total: 21.013 km^{2} (8.113 sq mi)
- Elevation: 782 m (2,566 ft)

Population
  - Total: 399
- Postal code: 2357
- Area code: 07714

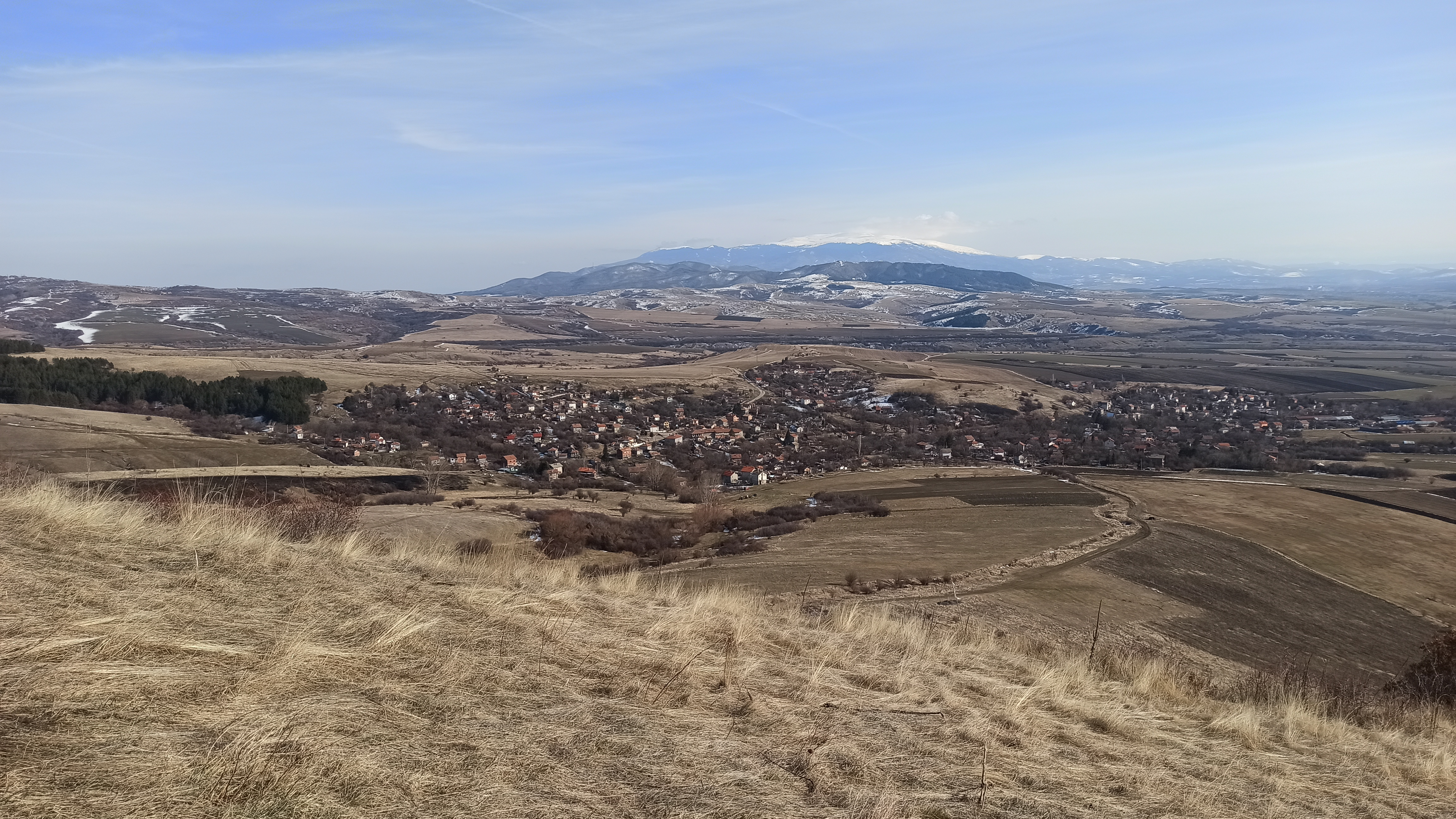
Rasnik in 2022

Rasnik is a village in southern Bulgaria, in Pernik Municipality, Pernik Province. Аccording to the 2020 Bulgarian census, Rasnik has a population of 399 people with a permanent address registration in the settlement.

== Geography ==
Rasnik village is in Municipality Pernik, 15 kilometers west of Pernik and 40 kilometers from Sofia, the capital of Bulgaria. The neighboring villages are Meshtitsa and Viskyar.

Rasnik village lies between the plain Bazglav and Viskyar mountain, at an average elevation of 782 meters.

== History ==
Near the village, the remains of an ancient settlement have been found. The first written data confirming the existence of Rasnik dates back to the 16th century.

There are remains of an ancient Roman road near the village. According to local non-confirmed legends, the village was first established in 1306. It used to be in another area but later moved to its current location.

The name Rasnik stems from the fact that once in the area of the village the verdure was thriving. Rasnik translates into growth from Bulgarian language.

== Ethnicity ==
According to the Bulgarian population census in 2011.

	Number	Percentage(in %)
Total	399	100.00
Bulgarians	394	99
Turks	0	0
Romani	0	0
Others	0	0
Do not define themselves	0	0
Unanswered	5	1
