= Golemo Buchino =

Golemo Bucino
- Village
- Golemo Bucino
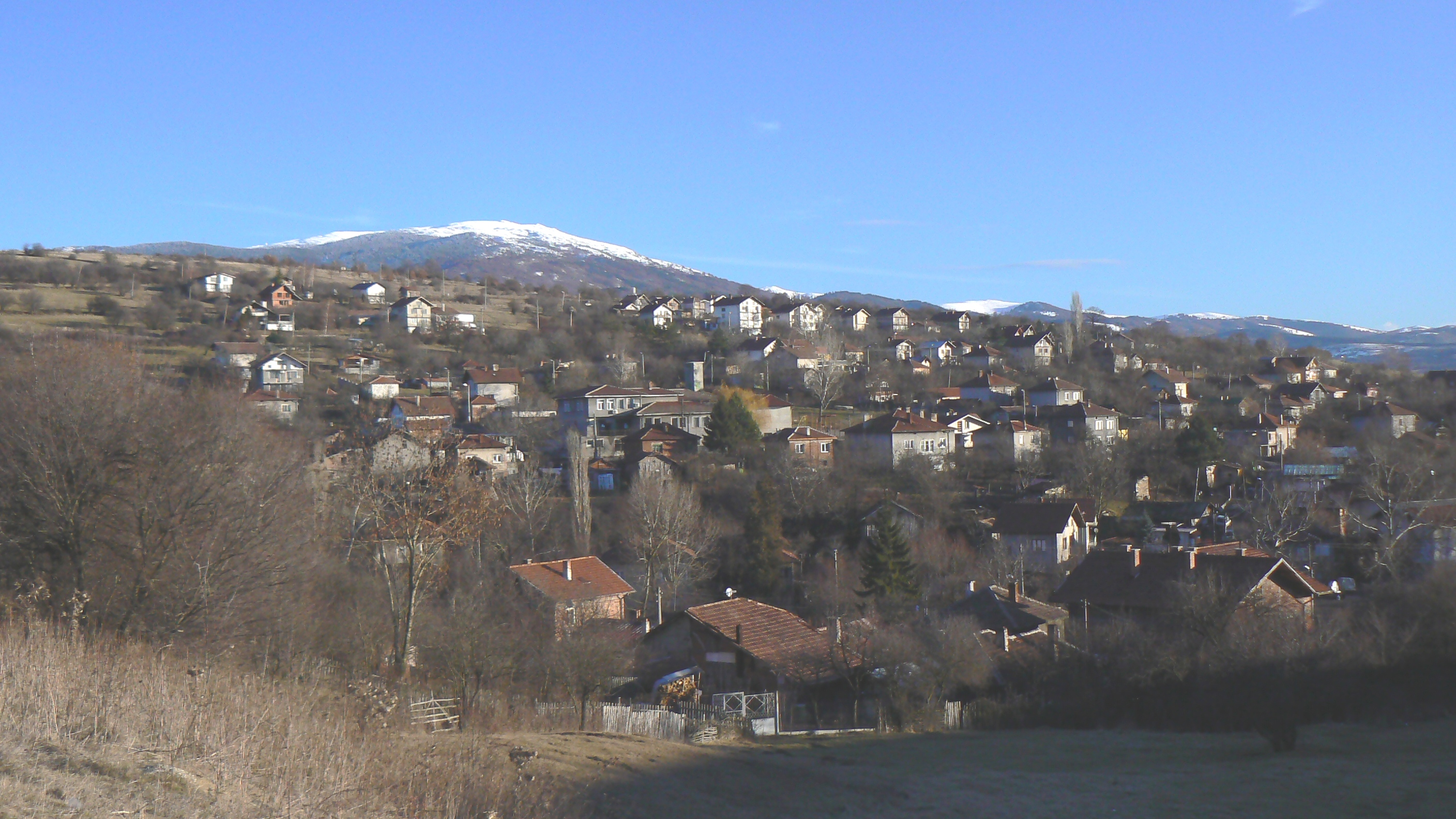
- Skyline of Golemo Bucino village and Vitosha mountain

- Location within Bulgaria
- Coordinates: 42.632791°N 23.12003°E
- Country: Bulgaria
- Province: Pernik Province
- Municipality: Pernik Municipality

Government
  - Mayor: Alexander Alexandrov

Area
  - Total: 17.974 km^{2} (6.940 sq mi)
- Elevation: 778 m (2,552 ft)

Population
  - Total: 660
- Postal code: 2348

Golemo Bucino is a village in Southern Bulgaria, in Pernik Municipality, Pernik Province. Аccording to the 2020 Bulgarian census, Golemo Buchino has a population of around 800 people with a permanent address registration in the settlement.

== Geography ==
Golemo Bucino is at the foot of Lyulin Mountain. Highway Trakia passes close to the village. It is 18 kilometers from Sofia.

The air is clean mainly due to a mountain air current passing through the village.

== Culture and Infrastructure ==
There is a monastery 1 kilometer from the village. The Golemobucinski monastery "Vaznesenie Gospodne" dates back to the 18th century. It was partly renovated in the 19th century.

=== Buildings ===
- The community hall and library "Lyulinski Izgrev 1903" was built in 1903
- The church "Sveti Duh" was built in 2006 with donations from the villagers

== Ethnicity ==
According to the Bulgarian population census in 2011.

	Number	Percentage(in %)
Total	726	100.00
Bulgarians	586	81
Turks	90	12
Romani	11	2
Others	0	0
Do not define themselves	0	0
Unanswered	34	5
