= Viskear =

- Village
- Viskear
- Location within Bulgaria
- Coordinates: 42.761111°N 22.944167°E
- Country: Bulgaria
- Province: Pernik Province
- Municipality: Pernik Municipality

Government
  - Mayor: Ivaylo Yordanov

Area
  - Total: 10.907 km^{2} (4.211 sq mi)
- Elevation: 784 m (2,572 ft)

Population
  - Total: 89
- Postal code: 2358
- Area code: 07714

Viskear is a village in Southern Bulgariam in Pernik Municipality, Pernik Province. Аccording to the 2020 Bulgarian census, Viskear has a population of 89 people with a permanent address registration in the settlement.

== Geography ==
Viskear village is on the border between Sofia and Pernik municipalities, and lies in the foot of Viskear mountain.

The mountain is low with the highest peak Mechi Kamak (1077m).

Viskear village is 15 kilometers northwest of Pernik and 9 kilometers southeast of Breznik. Moreover, it is 10 kilometers northwest of Rasnik, while the capital Sofia lies 45 kilometers to the east.

The village is at a high elevation with an average of 784 meters above sea level.

The climate above 800 meters in the village is mountain climate, while below 800 meters is continental.

== Others ==
There are 28 historical Thracian mounds near the village, which during 2006 Simeon Sakskoburgotski ordered it to become the site of a quarry and be destroyed. The local city council ruled against it and a massive outbreak took place. In the end, the municipality managed to preserve the historical mounts of national significance.

== Ethnicity ==
According to the Bulgarian population census in 2011.

	Number	Percentage(in %)
Total	102	100.00
Bulgarians	98	96
Turks	0	0
Romani	0	0
Others	0	0
Do not define themselves	0	0
Unanswered	4	4
