= Vitanovtsi =

- Village
- Vitanovtsi
- Location within Bulgaria
- Coordinates: 42.647982°N 22.979896°E
- Country: Bulgaria
- Province: Pernik Province
- Municipality: Pernik Municipality

Government
  - Mayor: Radostina Maksimova

Area
  - Total: 7.336 km^{2} (2.832 sq mi)
- Elevation: 692 m (2,270 ft)

Population
  - Total: 268
- Postal code: 2354
- Area code: 07719

Vitanovtsi is a village in Southern Bulgaria. The village is located in Pernik Municipality, Pernik Province. Аccording to the numbers provided by the 2020 Bulgarian census, Vitanovtsi currently has a population of 268 people with a permanent address registration in the settlement.

== Geography ==
Vitanovtsi village is located in Pernik Municipality, and lies 8 kilometers northwest of Pernik, and 37 kilometers west of Sofia. The climate is continental with soft winter and cool summer. The average elevation of the village is 692 meters.

There are three dams near the village – Meshtitsa, Yardzhilovtsi, and Slakovtsi, respectively 5 kilometers and 9 kilometers away from Vitanovtsi.

== Infrastructure ==
There is a supermarket in the village, while the nearest medical help is located at the nearest municipality. There is a new temple "Vsi Sveti" and a football club alongside a stadium.

- "Vsi Svetii" Church was built in 2007 on the parcel of the previous school.
- The community hall and library "Otets Paisii" was built in 1928.

== Ethnicity ==
According to the Bulgarian population census in 2011.

| | Number | Percentage(in %) |
| Total | 269 | 100.00 |
| Bulgarians | 269 | 100 |
| Turks | 0 | 0 |
| Romani | 0 | 0 |
| Others | 0 | 0 |
| Do not define themselves | 0 | 0 |
| Unanswered | 0 | 0 |
