= Studena, Pernik Province =

Studena
- Village
- Studena
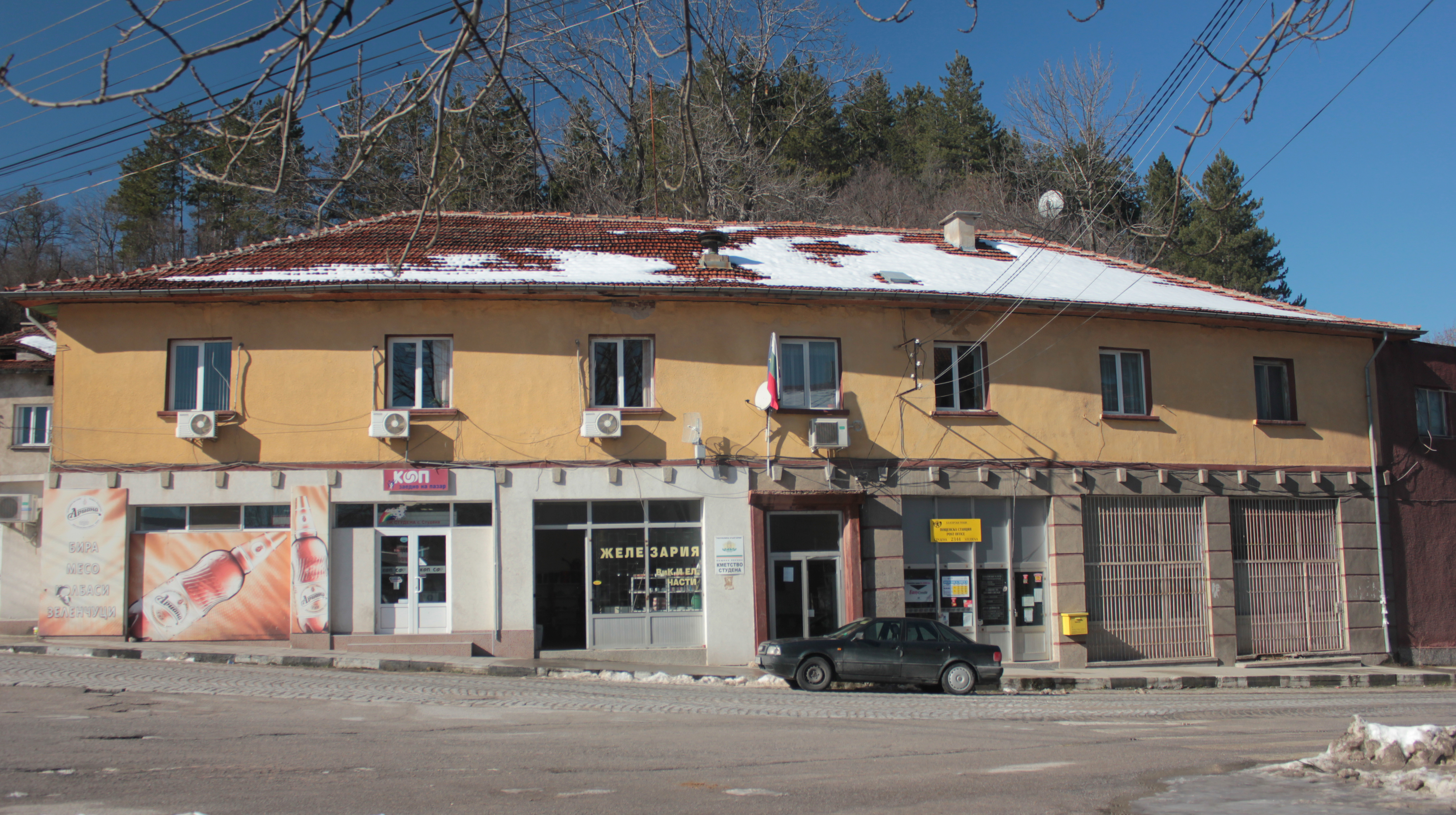
- Studena village's Hall

- Location within Bulgaria
- Coordinates: 42°32′31″N 23°07′24″E
- Country: Bulgaria
- Province: Pernik Province
- Municipality: Pernik Municipality

Government
  - Mayor: Kiril Kirov

Area
  - Total: 74.794 km^{2} (28.878 sq mi)
- Elevation: 789 m (2,589 ft)

Population
  - Total: 1,740
- Postal code: 2344
- Area code: 07715

Studena is a village in Southern Bulgaria, in Pernik Municipality, Pernik Province. Аccording to the 2020 Bulgarian census, Studena has a population of 1740 people with a permanent address registration in the settlement.

== Geography ==
Studena village is located in Municipality Pernik, 15 kilometers away west from Pernik and 25 kilometers away from Sofia, the capital of Bulgaria. It is located near the southern hills of Vitosha mountain and borders Golo Bardo. There is a nearby water dam next to the village, bearing the same name Dam Studena.

The climate is humid continental (Köppen climate classification Dfb), featuring a warm summer and a winter below freezing.

The name of the village stems from a story, according to which a Bulgarian freedom fighter along with his troops held the Byzantine empire army for one hundred days at the location before they overtook Sofia. From that, sto dena, which means one hundred days transitioned roughly into Studena.

== History ==
The initial name of the village was Istudene and can be found in Ottoman text dating back to the 15th century. The village's festive day is "Arhangelovden" and has been honored each year after the local church had been built.

There is a church "Sveti Georgi" dating back to the 15th century that was renovated and can be visited in the village.

== Ethnicity ==
According to the Bulgarian population census in 2011.

	Number	Percentage(in %)
Total	1819	100.00
Bulgarians	1748	96
Turks	0	0
Romani	0	0
Others	0	0
Do not define themselves	0	0
Unanswered	70	4
