= Meshtitsa =

- Village
- Meshtitsa
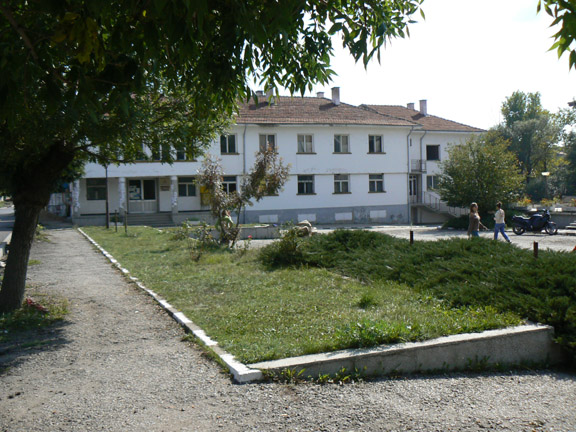
- Meshtitsa village's square

- Location within Bulgaria
- Coordinates: 42.666786°N 23.000364°E
- Country: Bulgaria
- Province: Pernik Province
- Municipality: Pernik Municipality

Government
  - Mayor: Deyan Stanimirov

Area
  - Total: 20.13 km^{2} (7.77 sq mi)
- Elevation: 695 m (2,280 ft)

Population
  - Total: 35,748
- Postal code: 2353
- Area code: 07714

Meshtitsa is a village in southern Bulgaria. The village is located in Pernik Municipality, Pernik Province. Аccording to the numbers provided by the 2020 Bulgarian census, Ciuipetlovo currently has a population of 1003 people with a permanent address registration in the settlement.

== Geography ==
Meshtitsa is 32 kilometers from the capital of Bulgaria, Sofia, and 7 kilometers from Pernik. The river Konska passes near the village. The terrain near the village is suitable for agricultural development. The village lies at an average elevation of 695 meters.

== Culture and Infrastructure ==
Every year a "Surva" festival is held on 13 January in Meshtitsa village. It includes people dressing up with masks and folklore clothing to scare evil spirits away from the village as per tradition.

The people participating in the festival craft their own costumes and masks from animal horns and leather. Occasionally bird feathers are used to decorate the clothing.

=== Buildings and infrastructure ===
- Community hall and library "P. K. Yavorov" was built in 1928.
- There is a kindergarten in the village.

== Ethnicity ==
According to the Bulgarian population census in 2011.

	Number	Percentage(in %)
Total	35873	100.00
Bulgarians	35854	98
Turks	0	0
Romani	6	0
Others	0	0
Do not define themselves	0	0
Unanswered	12	2
