= Kralev =

Kralev (Bulgarian: Кралев) may refer to:

== People ==
- Krasen Kralev (born 1967), Bulgarian politician and businessman
- Nicholas Kralev (born 1974), American journalist
- Plamen Kralev (born 1973), Bulgarian racing driver

== Places ==
- Kralev Dol, a village in Pernik province, Bulgaria
- Kralev Dvor, a peak in Pirin Mountains, Bulgaria
