= Pernik Municipality =

- Municipality
- Flag Coat of arms

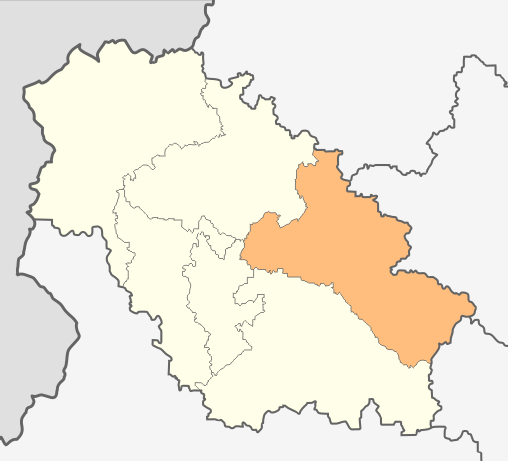
- Location of Pernik Municipality in Pernik Province

- Location of Pernik Municipality in Bulgaria
- Coordinates: 42°36′00″N 23°01′59″E
- Country: Bulgaria
- Province: Pernik Province
- Capital: Pernik

Area
  - Total: 477.4 km^{2} (184.3 sq mi)
- Elevation: 717 m (2,352 ft)

Population (2011)
  - Total: 97,181
  - Density: 203.6/km^{2} (527.2/sq mi)

Pernik Municipality (Bulgarian: Община Перник) is a municipality in the Pernik Province of Bulgaria.

== Demography ==
Ethnic composition of Pernik Municipality
1. Bulgarians (91.4%)
2. Gypsies/Romani (1.83%)
3. No identification (6.36%)
4. Other (0.65%)

At the 2011 census, the population of Pernik was 97,181. Most of the inhabitants were Bulgarians (91.4%) with a minority of Gypsies/Romani (1.83%). 6.36% of the population's ethnicity was unknown.

== Villages ==
In addition to the capital town of Pernik, the municipality consists of one more town and 22 villages.

- Batanovtsi (town)
- Bogdanovdol
- Bosnek
- Cerna Gora
- Chuypetlovo
- Divotino
- Dragichevo
- Golemo Bucino
- Yardzhilovtsi
- Kladnitsa
- Kralev Dol
- Leskovets
- Lyulin
- Meshtitsa
- Planintsa
- Radui
- Rasnik
- Rudartsi
- Selishten Dol
- Studena
- Viskear
- Vitanovtsi
- Zidartsi
