= Cerna Gora =

Cerna Gora may refer to:

- Cerna Gora, Pernik Province
- Černá Hora (Blansko District)

== See also ==
- Cerna (disambiguation)
- Černá
- Montenegro, "Crna Gora"
