= Radui =

- Village
- Radui
- Location within Bulgaria
- Coordinates: 42.730652°N 23.024826°E
- Country: Bulgaria
- Province: Pernik Province
- Municipality: Pernik Municipality

Government
  - Mayor: Venetka Vasileva

Area
  - Total: 14.445 km^{2} (5.577 sq mi)
- Elevation: 771 m (2,530 ft)

Population
  - Total: 61
- Postal code: 2359
- Area code: 07714

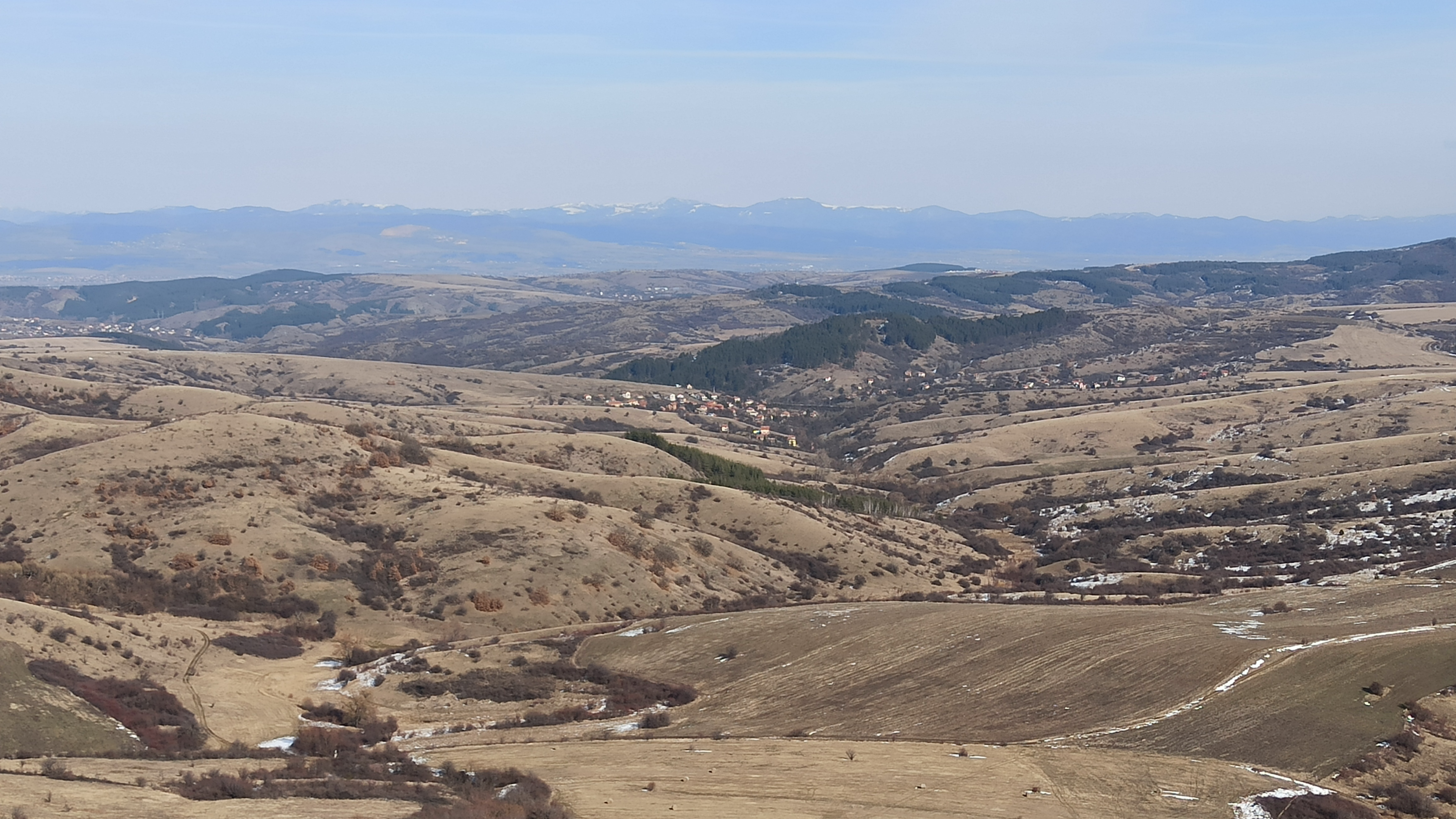
View of Radui

Radui is a village in Southern Bulgaria. The village is in Pernik Municipality, Pernik Province. Аccording to the 2020 Bulgarian census, Radui currently has a population of 61 people with a permanent address registration in the settlement.

== Geography ==
Radui village is in Western Bulgaria in Municipality Pernik, 20 kilometers from Pernik. The village lies at the foot of Viskyar mountain and borders Lyulin Mountain. The average elevation of the village is 771 meters.

Two kilometers west of the village, the remains of an ancient fortress have been discovered, signifying that the area had previously been occupied before the Middle Ages.

The first written proof of the village's existence dates back to 1452.

Radui village is a protected geographical bird area. It lies in a continental climate area, while only the part of the village above 750 meters elevation, is specified as mountain climate.

== History ==
According to the Ottoman texts, the village was moved twice due to Bulgarians running from Ottoman rule. It has been relocated by 2–3 kilometers from its previous location.

Legends say that the name of the village stems from three brothers looking for a place to live. One of the villagers found the place and exclaimed for everyone to rejoice, hence the name "Radui" which means joy in the Bulgarian language.

== Ethnicity ==
According to the Bulgarian census in 2011.

	Number	Percentage(in %)
Total	51	100.00
Bulgarians	31	61
Turks	0	0
Romani	0	0
Others	0	0
Do not define themselves	0	0
Unanswered	0	0
