= Bankya =

Bankya Банкя
- Town
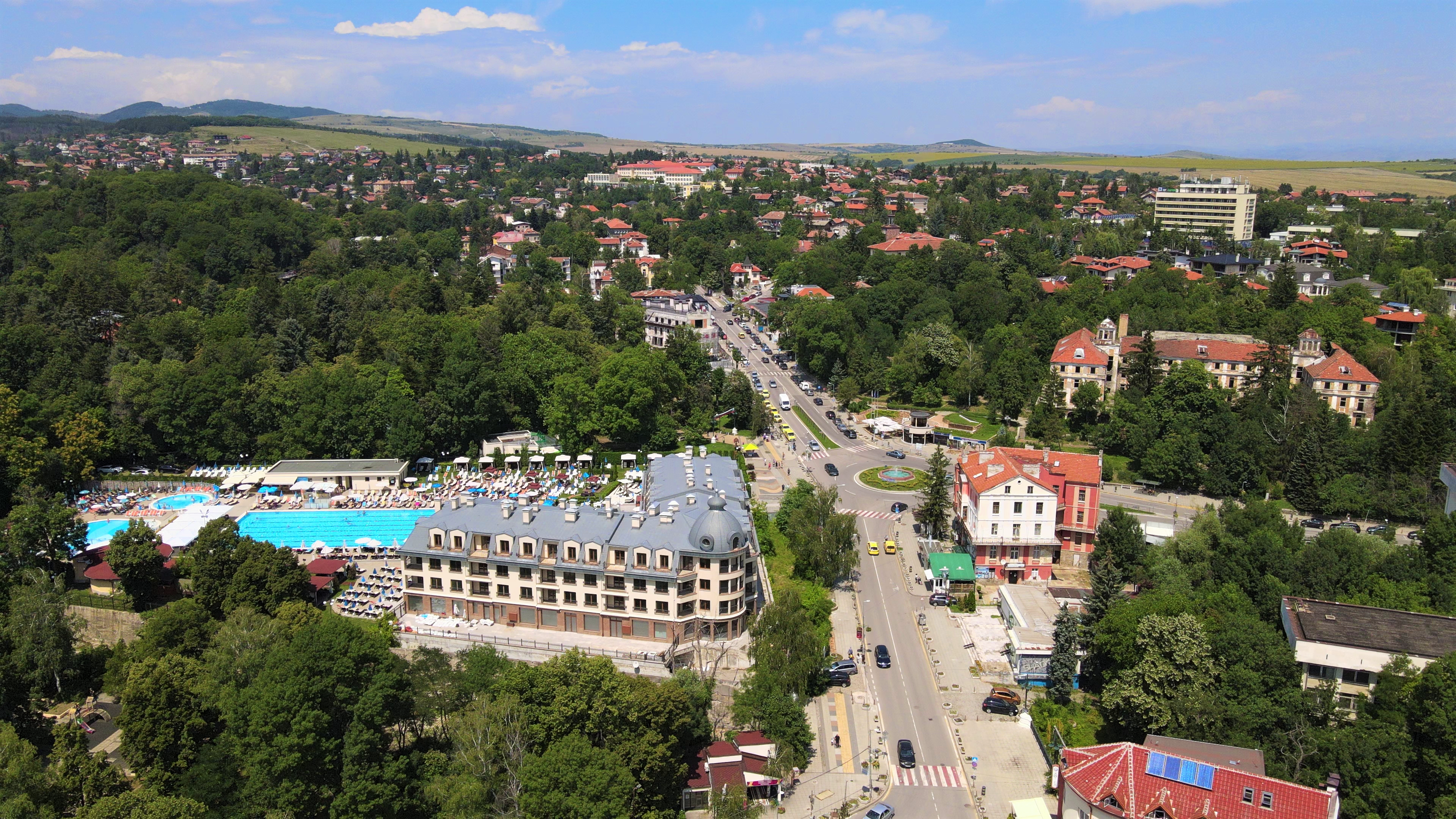
- Bankya center
- Interactive map of Bankya
- Location of Bankya
- Coordinates: 42°42′N 23°8′E
- Country: Bulgaria
- Province (Oblast): Sofia City

Government
  - Mayor: Rangel Markov

Area
  - Total: 33 km^{2} (13 sq mi)
- Elevation: 695 m (2,280 ft)

Population (2021)
  - Total: 10,244
  - Density: 310/km^{2} (800/sq mi)
- Time zone: UTC+2 (EET)
  - Summer (DST): UTC+3 (EEST)
- Postal Code: 1320
- Area code: 02997

Bankya (Bulgarian: Банкя [ˈbaŋkʲɐ]) is a small town located on the outskirts of Sofia in western Bulgaria. It is administratively part of Greater Sofia.

The district is famous for the mineral springs and baths that have been used for medicinal purposes for hundreds of years. In 1969 the village of Bankya was proclaimed a town, and in 1979 it became part of Sofia, the capital of Bulgaria.

Bankya is 17 km west of capital Sofia. It is situated at the foot of Lyulin Mountain at an average elevation of around 630–750 meters. The first people to populate the region of Bankya were Thracian tribes, over 2,500 years ago. Archaeological excavations near the quarter of Ivanyane have unearthed remains of Ancient Roman buildings, walls and sewers, and bronze bracelets from the 4th–5th century. Bankya's economy depends mainly on tourism and balneological treatment.

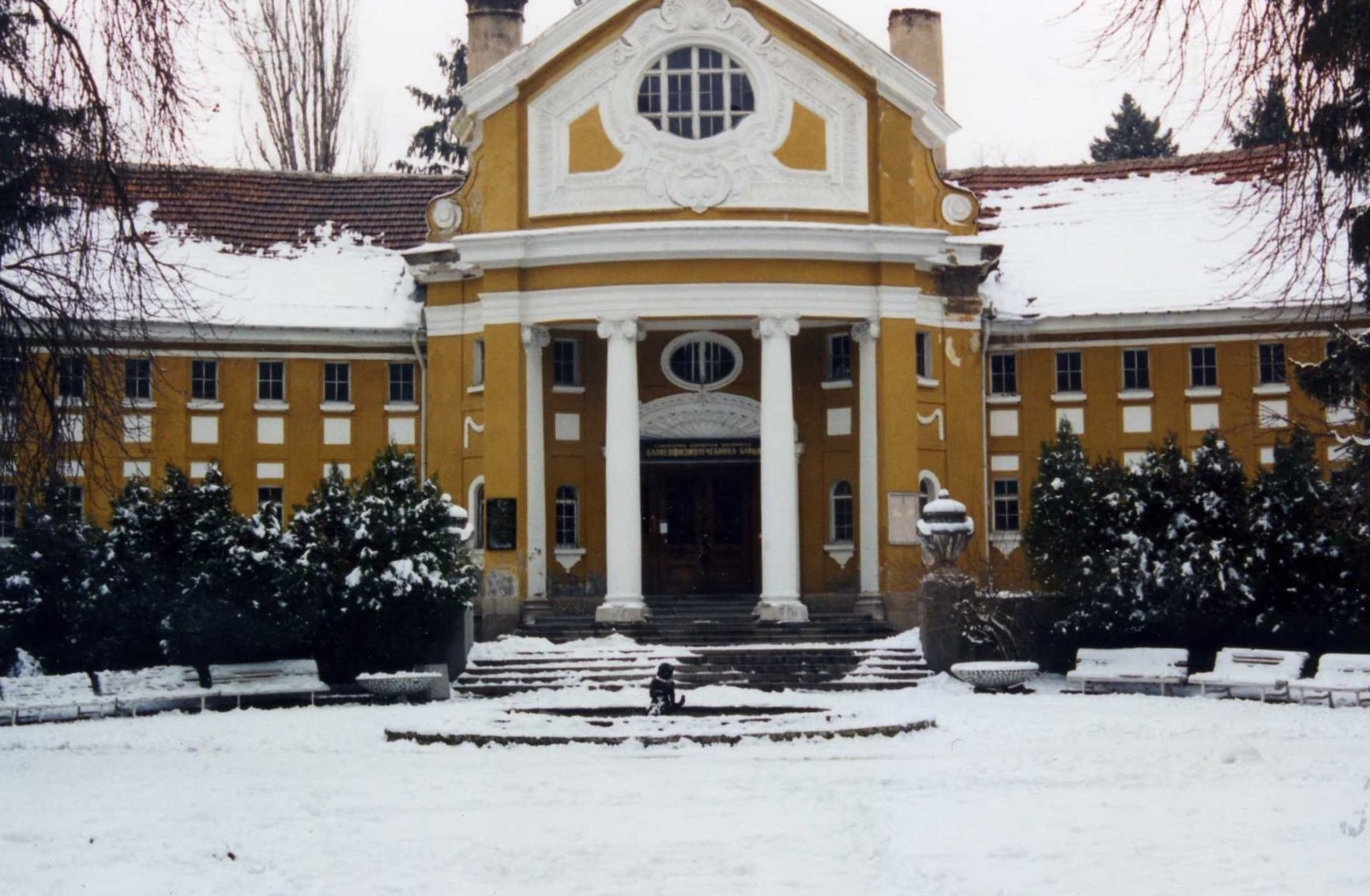
The Mineral Baths in Bankya

Bankya was first mentioned as Banka in the 15th century. The former villages of Verdikal, Gradoman and Mihaylovo are part of the town itself, while Ivanyane and Klisura are part of the municipality. Bankya's name stems from the common noun bankya, "hot spring", a diminutive of banya ("baths").

Krisi is the birthplace of the founder of GERB – Boyko Borisov, former prime minister of Bulgaria.

== Demographics ==
Historical population
Year	Pop.	±%
1975	8,285	—
1985	7,648	−7.7%
1992	7,557	−1.2%
2001	8,458	+11.9%
2011	11,089	+31.1%
2021	10,244	−7.6%
Source: pop-stat.mashke.org

== Places of interest ==
- "Vazov's Oak", Ivan Vazov's favourite resting place.
- The Church of Martyrs Quiricus and Julietta, built in 1932 and inaugurated by bishop Stephen from Sofia.
- The Mineral Baths in Bankya, built in 1907 – 1910 to the design of Munich architect Carl Hocheder.

== Honour ==
Bankya Peak on Graham Land in Antarctica is named after the town.
