= Lyulin, Pernik Province =

Lyulin
- Village
- Lyulin
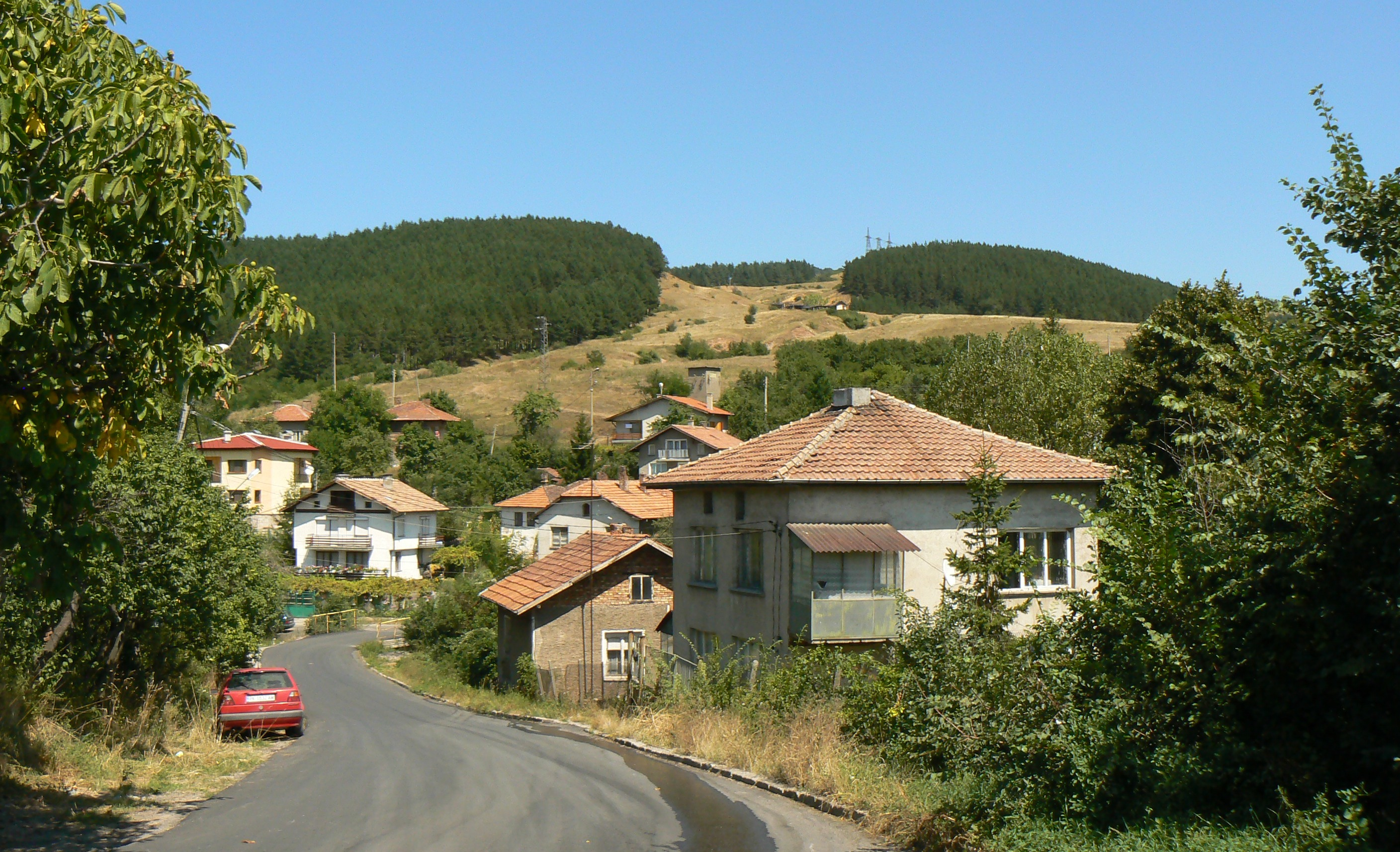
- Lyulin village view

- Location within Bulgaria
- Coordinates: 42.647908°N 23.084585°E
- Country: Bulgaria
- Province: Pernik Province
- Municipality: Pernik Municipality

Government
  - Mayor: Ilcho Evgeniev

Area
  - Total: 22.191 km^{2} (8.568 sq mi)
- Elevation: 843 m (2,766 ft)

Population
  - Total: 748
- Postal code: 2352
- Area code: 07717

Lyulin is a village in Southern Bulgaria. The village is located in Pernik Municipality, Pernik Province. Аccording to the numbers provided by the 2020 Bulgarian census, Ciuipetlovo currently has a population of 748 people with a permanent address registration in the settlement.

== Geography ==
Lyulin is located in a mountain area in the foot of the southwestern hills of Lyulin mountain. The village has a continental climate, which makes it possible to grow a variety of crops. The village is suitable for animal husbandry.

The highest peak in Lyulin mountain Dupevitsa (1256 m.) is close to the village. Lyulin mountain connects with Vitosha mountain through a plain.

== Culture and infrastructure ==
Lyulin village has a good infrastructure with many public transportation lines passing through, mainly toward Knyazhevo, Vladaya, Bankya, and Pernik.

=== Buildings and infrastructure ===
- Horse base, stables, and riding facilities, horse riding club “Kibela”
- A new church was built in 2010, as a donation from Bozhidar Dimitrov
- Hristo Botev community hall and library

== Ethnicity ==
According to the Bulgarian population census in 2011.

	Number	Percentage(in %)
Total	849	100.00
Bulgarians	822	97
Turks	0	0
Romani	0	0
Others	0	0
Do not define themselves	0	0
Unanswered	26	3
