= Divotino =

Divotino Дивотино
- Village
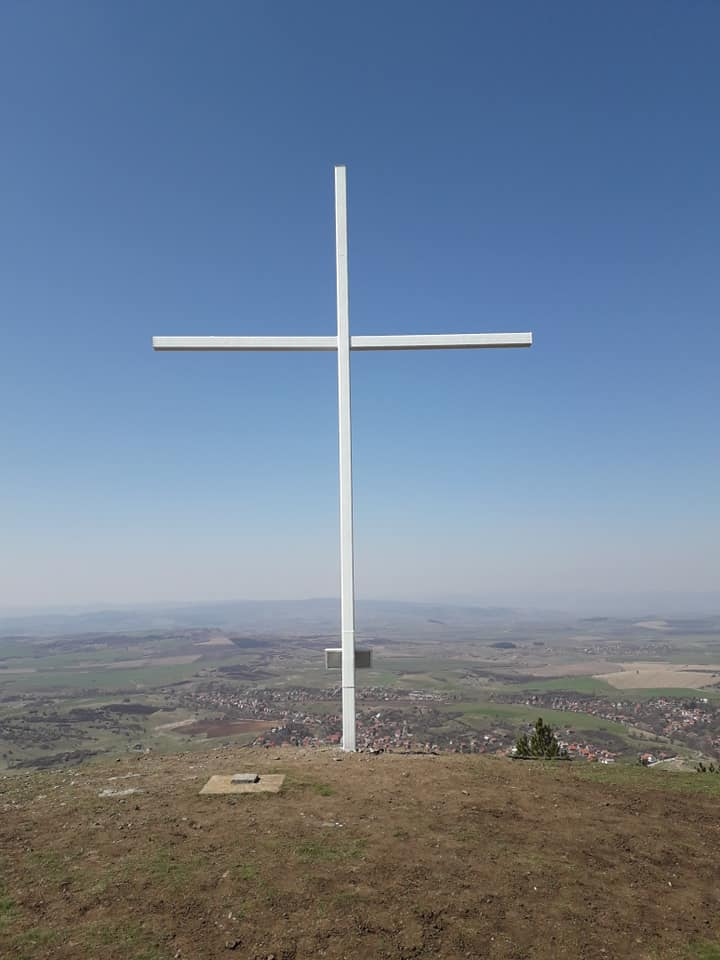

- Location of Planinitsa
- Coordinates: 42°39′19″N 23°02′58″E
- Country: Bulgaria
- Province (Oblast): Pernik
- Municipality (Obshtina): Pernik
- First mentioned: 1576

Government
  - Mayor: Rumen Sergiev

Area
  - Land: 26.631 km^{2} (10.282 sq mi)
- Elevation: 841 m (2,759 ft)

Population (2020)
  - Total: 1,725
- Time zone: UTC+2 (EET)
  - Summer (DST): UTC+3 (EEST)
- Postal Code: 2350
- License plate: PK

Divotino (Bulgarian: Дивотино) is a village in western Bulgaria, located in Pernik Province, Pernik Municipality.

== Geography ==
Divotino is a village in Bulgaria located 4 km north of Pernik, at the foot of Lyulin mountain.

== History ==
The village of Divotino is an old, medieval settlement, inscribed in the lists of the Djelepkeshans from 1576 under the name Дивотине (Divotine), to the Grahova nahia of the Kaaza Sofia. The village is first mentioned in Ottoman registers from the 15th century. Remains of the primitive municipal system (Neolithic, Paleolithic) have been found in its territory. The Liberation of Bulgaria passed almost silently for the inhabitants of the village of Divotino: about fifteen Russian officers descended from Lyulin, but as they did not find Turkish inhabitants in the village, they continued to Pernik and Radomir.

== Religion ==
Orthodox Christians have always been the predominant religious group in the village, even during the Ottoman rule. There is a church in the village, with Divotin Monastery nearby.

== Notable people ==
- Stojan Popov (1865 – 1939), child writer

== Honour ==
Divotino Point on Robert Island in the South Shetland Islands, Antarctica is named after Divotino.
