= Bogdanovdol =

- Village
- Bogdanovdol
- Location within Bulgaria
- Coordinates: 42.612448°N 22.958737°E
- Country: Bulgaria
- Province: Pernik Province
- Municipality: Pernik Municipality

Government
  - Mayor: Ventzislava Kirilova

Area
  - Total: 9.975 km^{2} (3.851 sq mi)
- Elevation: 700 m (2,300 ft)

Population
  - Total: 569
- Postal code: 2341
- Area code: 07712

Bogdanovdol is a village in Southern Bulgaria, in Pernik Municipality, Pernik Province. Аccording to the 2020 Bulgarian census, Bogdanovdol has a population of 569 people with a permanent address registration in the settlement.

== Geography ==
Bogdanovdol village is in Southern Bulgaria. The major part of the village's eastern area is occupied by agricultural lands. Near the southern part of the land area of the village, the main road between Breznik and Tran passes. There is also a river that passes through the territory – Konska Reka.

The elevation in the village varies between 600 and 900 meters with an average of 700 meters. The climate of the village is continental. It lies on the borders of the Balkan Mountains.

There is a developed vegetable production, and fruit growing in the village.

== Culture ==
The village's first mention dates back to the Middle Ages. The name of the village originates from the legend that the first person who settled in the area bore the name of Bogdan, thus Bogdanovdol.

== Ethnicity ==
According to the Bulgarian population census in 2011.

	Number	Percentage(in %)
Total	486	100.00
Bulgarians	481	98.97
Turks	5	1
Romani	0	0
Others	0	0
Do not define themselves	4	0.8
Unanswered	1	0.02
