= Planinitsa, Pernik Oblast =

Planinitsa Планиница
- Village
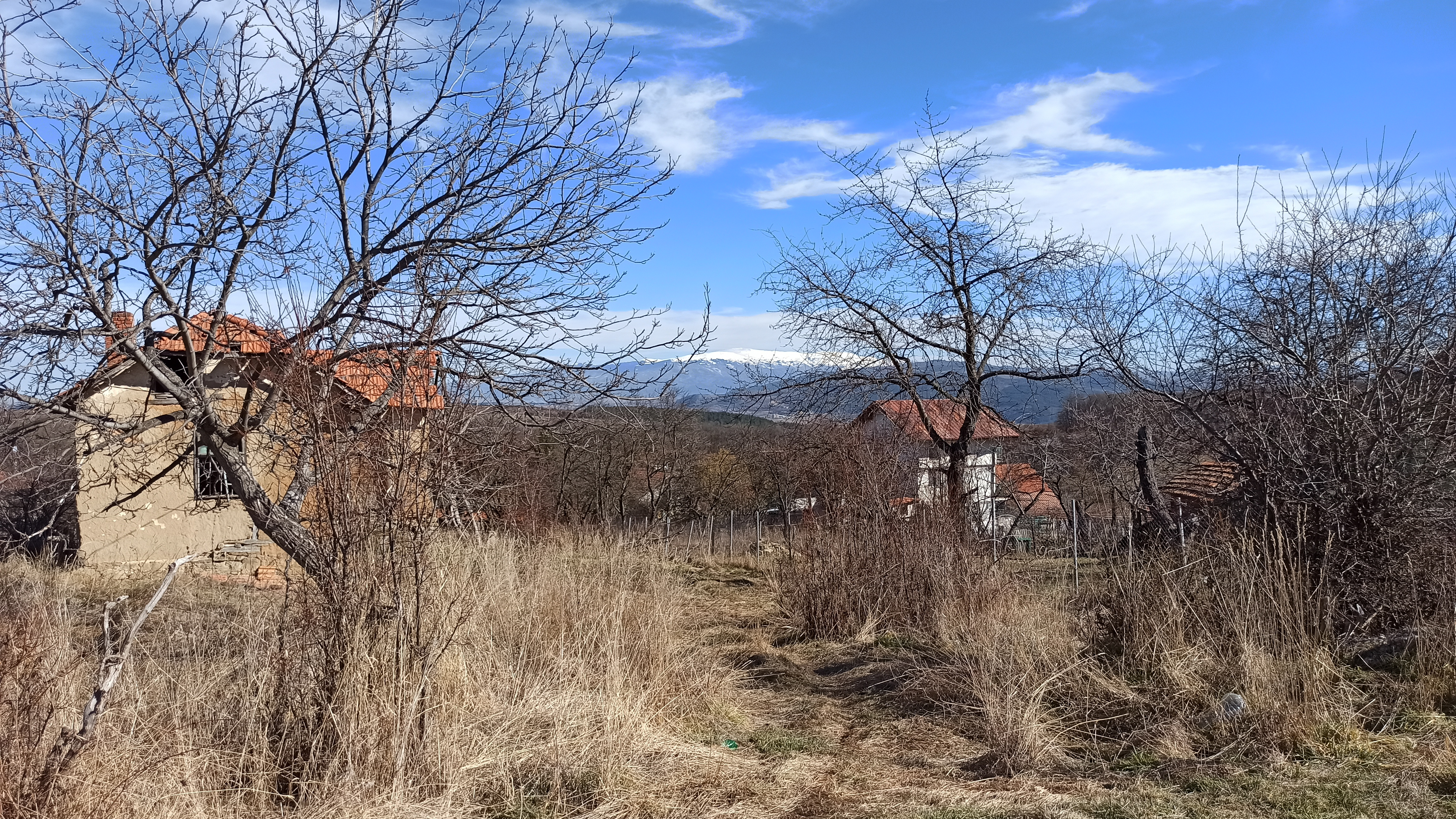

- Location of Planinitsa
- Coordinates: 42°35′57″N 22°52′39″E
- Country: Bulgaria
- Province (Oblast): Pernik
- Municipality (Obshtina): Pernik
- First mentioned: 1448

Government
  - Mayor: Rumen Ivanov

Area
  - Land: 3.719 km^{2} (1.436 sq mi)
- Elevation: 894 m (2,933 ft)

Population (2024)
  - Total: 24
- Time zone: UTC+2 (EET)
  - Summer (DST): UTC+3 (EEST)
- Postal Code: 2340
- License plate: PK

Planinitsa (Bulgarian: Планиница, also transliterated Planinica) is a village in western Bulgaria. Its located in Pernik Province, Pernik Municipality.

== Geography and climate ==
Planinitsa is in a mountainous region, 45 km southwest of Sofia and 12 km west of Pernik.

The climate is humid continental with cool summer and average temperatures of 22 °C and soft and snowy winter with average temperatures of 1 °C.

== Events ==
Every first Sunday of July the village celebrates the traditional day of the village.

== Name ==
The name derives from the Bulgarian word Planina, which means mountain + the Slavic suffix -itsa.

The village was recorded in historical records in 1448 as Planintsi.

== Landmarks ==
Late antique and medieval fortress in Gradishte, 1.16 km west of the village of Planinitsa, on the eastern slope of Cherna Gora. The fortress was built in late antiquity on an area of about 3 acres. In the past, part of the fortress walls and the separate rooms to them were preserved. It also existed in the early Middle Ages.

== Political situation ==
The village shares a mayor with the neighbouring village of Leskovets, due to the small size of the village.

== Notable people ==
- Vergil Vaklinov (1931 – 1953), Border Guard
- Alexander Alexandrov (1991 – ), GERB
- Alexander Planinski (1879 - 1969), Writer
