= Kralev Dol =

- Village
- Kralev Dol
- Location within Bulgaria
- Coordinates: 42.566667°N 23.083333°E
- Country: Bulgaria
- Province: Pernik Province
- Municipality: Pernik Municipality

Government
  - Mayor: Plamen Georgiev

Area
  - Total: 14.618 km^{2} (5.644 sq mi)
- Elevation: 796 m (2,612 ft)

Population
  - Total: 688
- Postal code: 2349
- Area code: 076

Kralev Dol is a village in Southern Bulgaria. The village is located in Pernik Municipality, Pernik Province. Аccording to the numbers provided by the 2020 Bulgarian census, Ciuipetlovo currently has a population of 688 people with a permanent address registration in the settlement.

== Geography ==
Kralev Dol is located in the Southwest part of Bulgaria, in Pernik Municipality. The village borders river Struma, and lies in the foot of Golo Bardo mountain.

Kralev Dol village is located 12 kilometers away from Pernik and 25 kilometers away from the Capital of Bulgaria, Sofia.

Highway Struma passes 1.5 kilometers away from the village. The village belongs to the geographical area Graovo.

== Culture and Infrastructure ==
The name of the village stems from the Bulgarian hero Krali Marko. According to the legends, he passed through the village and left a mark of his giant foot in the hills above. The footprint in the rock has become a tourist attraction. It is a natural formation.

=== Buildings and infrastructure ===
- The villagers go to the Elementary School "Kiril i Metodii" in Pernik with organized public transport.
- Community hall and library "Paisiy Hilendarski" was built in 1927.
- The Church was built in 1864 and renovated in 2015 with the name of "Sv Paisiy Hilendarski"

== Ethnicity ==
According to the Bulgarian population census in 2011.

	Number	Percentage(in %)
Total	619	100.00
Bulgarians	192	31
Turks	0	0
Romani	0	0
Others	0	0
Do not define themselves	0	0
Unanswered	426	69
