= Dragichevo =

- Village
- Dragichevo
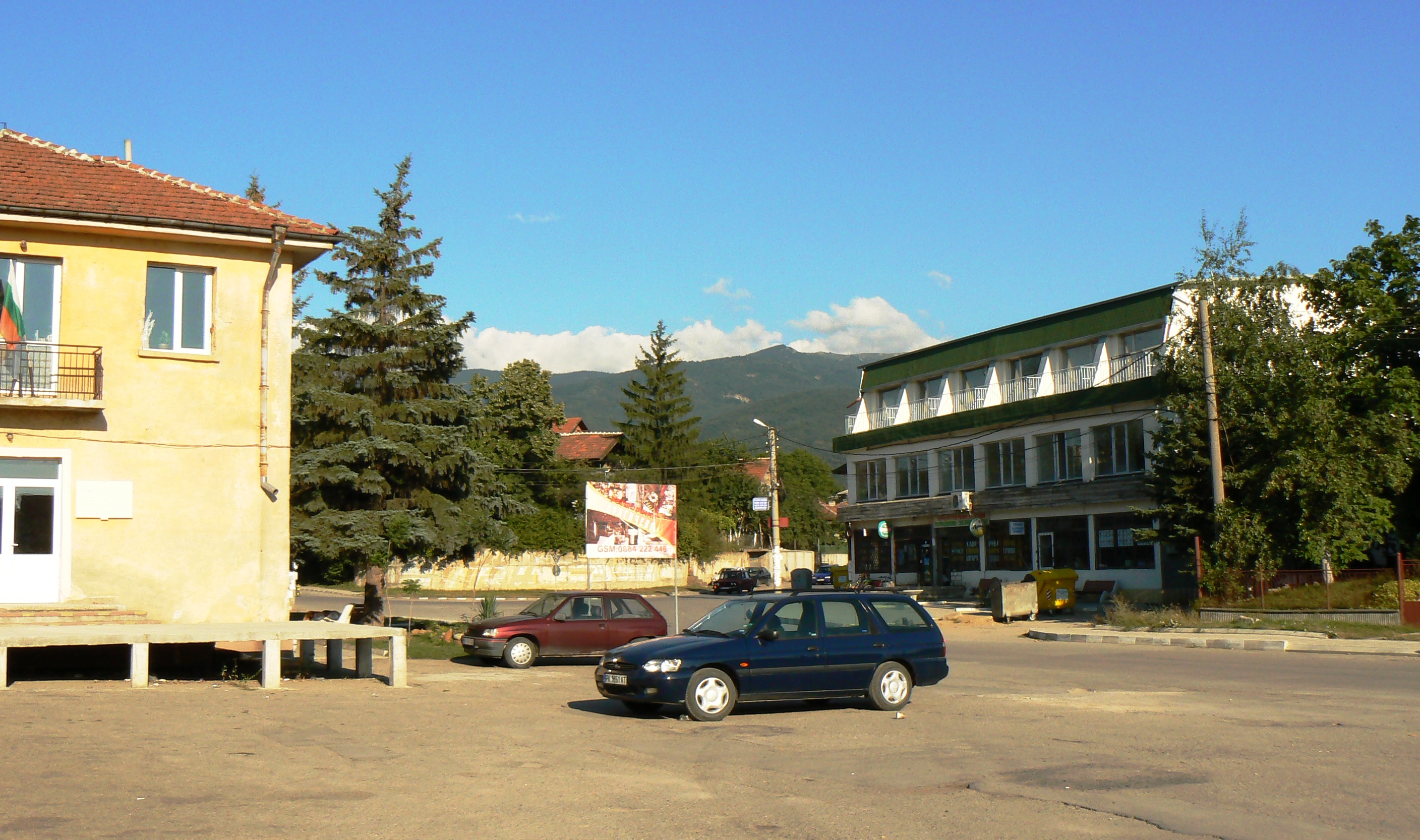
- Dragichevo Village's square

- Location within Bulgaria
- Coordinates: 42.604264°N 23.13908°E
- Country: Bulgaria
- Province: Pernik Province
- Municipality: Pernik Municipality

Government
  - Mayor: Victor Victorov

Area
  - Total: 20.448 km^{2} (7.895 sq mi)
- Elevation: 751 m (2,464 ft)

Population
  - Total: 2,149
- Postal code: 2351
- Area code: 07718

Dragichevo is a village in Southern Bulgaria, in Pernik Municipality, Pernik Province. Аccording to the 2020 Bulgarian census, Dragichevo has a population of 2149 people with a permanent address registration in the settlement.

== Geography and culture ==
Dragichevo is at the foot of Lyulin mountain, at an elevation of 740 meters. There are four quarters in the village: Kalinitsa, Rekata, Garata, and Rudarska.

== History ==
The first mention of Dragichevo village dates back to 1715. There are records of a village called Dragishchuva at its location from 1420. Afterwards, the name changes to Dragidzhuva in 1576 and to Dragichevo in 1728.

=== Buildings and infrastructure ===
The infrastructure of the village is very well developed as many of the people settled there live and work in Sofia and Pernik. There is public transport, although the village is polluted due to it.

Buildings

- The church "Uspenie Bogorodichno" was built in 1862
- The local school dates back to 1895.
- The local community hall and library was built in 1922.

== Ethnicity ==
According to the Bulgarian population census in 2011.

	Number	Percentage(in %)
Total	2121	100.00
Bulgarians	2020	95
Turks	0	0
Romani	27	1.2
Others	4	0.1
Do not define themselves	0	0
Unanswered	67	3
