= Forced labour camps in the People's Republic of Bulgaria =

As in other Eastern Bloc states, the communist People's Republic of Bulgaria operated a network of forced labour camps between 1944 and 1989, with particular intensity until 1962. Tens of thousands of prisoners were sent to these institutions, often without trial.

== Background ==
The Red Army entered Bulgaria in September 1944 and immediately, partisans exacted reprisals. Tens of thousands were executed, including active fascists and members of the political police, but also people who were simply of the non-Communist intelligentsia, members of the professional and bourgeois classes. Merely displeasing a Communist cadre could lead to execution. These massacres were actively encouraged by Georgi Dimitrov, who sent a telegram from Moscow a week after the Soviets' arrival in Sofia calling for the "torching of all signs of Bulgarian jingoism, nationalism, or anti-Communism". On 20 September, the Central Committee called for "anti-Communist resistance" and "counterrevolutionaries" to be exterminated.

A People's Tribunal was created in October 1944. This special court pronounced 12,000 death sentences, with over 2,700 eventually being executed. (In contrast, in 1941–1944, the years of active Communist resistance, 357 people were executed for all crimes.) In early 1945, a government decree allowed for the creation of Work Education Centers (TVO in Bulgarian). These were in fact concentration camps. The decision was approved by all parties in the Fatherland Front, including those whose members soon found themselves in the centers. One category of inmates included pimps, blackmailers, beggars and idlers, while the other comprised all those judged as political threats to the state's stability and security. The power to execute this decree fell to the Office of State Security within the Ministry of the Interior. Over the next decade, a series of laws and decrees strengthened the state police's powers.

Not all people the regime found undesirable were put in forced labour camps. Deportation – forced resettlement in distant provincial areas – was another method employed. Between 1948 and 1953 some 25,000 were deported.

== Development ==
=== 1945–1949 ===
Forced labour camps operated at numerous sites across Bulgaria. The camps were set up near dams under construction, coal mines, and in certain agricultural areas. Some of the most infamous were Bobov Dol, Bogdanov Dol, Rositsa, Kutsian, Bosna, Nozharevo and Chernevo.

=== 1949–1953 ===
Political prisoners from other camps were gathered and regrouped in the Belene labour camp, located on Persin (Belene), an island in the Danube near Romania.

=== 1954–1956 ===
Deportations to the camps fell dramatically, perhaps ceasing altogether. However, Belene remained in operation.

=== 1956–1959 ===
A number of new inmates arrived at Belene after the Hungarian Revolution of 1956 and a crime wave in Sofia early in 1958. Among the figures held at Belene during this period included Konstantin Muraviev, the last Prime Minister of Bulgaria to hold office before the Fatherland Front coup of 9 September 1944.

=== 1959–1962 ===
A prisoners' hunger strike forced the closure of Belene in 1959. Those not freed (some documents indicate 166 in number) were transferred to a new camp at Lovech that bordered a rock quarry. Several thousand eventually joined this original group. In September 1961, around a hundred female prisoners were sent to a neighbouring camp in Skravena. That November, conditions noticeably improved at Lovech. In spring 1962, the Politburo created a commission, led by Boris Velchev, to inspect Lovech, which was closed in April as a result of his delegation's visit.

At Lovech and Skravena, 149 inmates died from abuse during this period.

Lovech, a city in north-central Bulgaria, lies at the edge of the Balkan Mountains. The last and harshest of the major Communist labour camps was set up near an abandoned rock quarry outside the city. Until 1959, the camps had been spread across Bulgaria, but most were closed following Chervenkov's fall and the inmates transferred to Lovech. The Ministry of the Interior, not the regional authorities, had direct control over the camp. Most Bulgarians were unaware of its existence, but it had a reputation among those who had incurred the state's displeasure as a place from where one might never emerge alive.

=== 1962–1989 ===
The intensity of state repression varied during these years. A Politburo decision in 1962 said that an individual could be imprisoned and assigned to forced labour without a court trial. Repression in this period was of an administrative rather than political nature, targeting those accused of "social parasitism" or "loose morals", often with information given by "people's organisations" such as the Fatherland Front's neighbourhood sections. In the 1980s, numerous Turkish Bulgarians were sent to Belene.

== Hierarchy ==
During the Lovech/Skravena period (1959–1962), Bulgarian state repression in the form of the camps happened along the following tiers (though the list of political and bureaucratic actors is not comprehensive):

- Todor Zhivkov was the Party leader and head of state, assisted by a series of prime ministers, including Anton Yugov, former interior minister.
- The Interior Ministry was under their orders. Georgi Tsankov was its head and Mincho Minchev was attorney general, required to sign all internment orders.
- Next was Mircho Spasov, vice-minister of the interior and in charge of the camps. At his side was Colonel Delcho Chakurov, director of the Office of Internment and Deportation.
- Colonel Ivan Trichkov, who had previously run Belene, was head of the Lovech camp from 1959 to 1961. Major Petur Gogov succeeded him and served from 1961 to 1962. Major Tsviatko Goranov oversaw the work details, while Lieutenant Nikolas Gazdov represented the Bureau of State Security. All these officers had had prior experience serving in concentration camps.
- The camp commanders were assisted by a group of low-ranking officers, non-commissioned officers, adjutants, and brigade chiefs, the last being recruited from among the criminals sent to the camp.

== Magnitude ==
In 1990, the Bulgarian Communist Party set up an inquiry commission into the camps. It found that between 1944 and 1962 there were approximately 100 forced labour camps in a country of 8 million inhabitants. Between 1944 and 1953, some 12,000 men and women passed through these camps, with an additional 5,000 between 1956 and 1962. According to one witness, Belene alone held 7,000 in 1952. Another estimates a total of 186,000 prisoners during this period. Definitive figures remain elusive.

== See also ==
- Tsvetana Jermanova, a survivor of the camps

== Bibliography ==
- Todorov, Tzvetan (1999). Voices from the Gulag: Life and Death in Communist Bulgaria. Robert Zaretsky (trans.). University Park, PA: Penn State Press. pp. 38–42.
