= Liulin (disambiguation) =

Liulin primarily refers to Liulin County (柳林县), Shanxi, China.

Liulin (柳林) may also refer to:

== Towns ==
- Liulin, Hui County, Gansu
- Liulin, Jonê County, Gansu
- Liulin, Hebei, in Neiqiu County
- Liulin, Zhengzhou, in Jinshui District, Zhengzhou, Henan
- Liulin, Sui County (柳林镇), in Sui County, Suizhou, Hubei
- Liulin, Chenggu County, Shaanxi
- Liulin, Fengxiang County, Shaanxi
- Liulin, Tongchuan, in Yaozhou District, Tongchuan, Shaanxi
- Liulin, Baota District, in Yan'an, Shaanxi
- Liulin, Liaocheng, in Guan County, Shandong
- Liulin, Juye County, Shandong
- Liulin, Shanxi, seat of Liulin County
- Liulin, Sichuan, in Bazhou District, Bazhong

== Townships ==
- Liulin Township, Henan, in Shihe District, Xinyang
- Liulin Township, Huangmei County, Hubei
- Liulin Township, Zhushan County, Hubei

== Other ==
- Liulin, Bofan, a village in Bofan, Anlu, Xiaogan, Hubei
- Liulin station, a metro station in the city of Zhengzhou in China

== See also ==
- Lyulin (disambiguation)
