= Rudartsi =

- Village
- Rudartsi
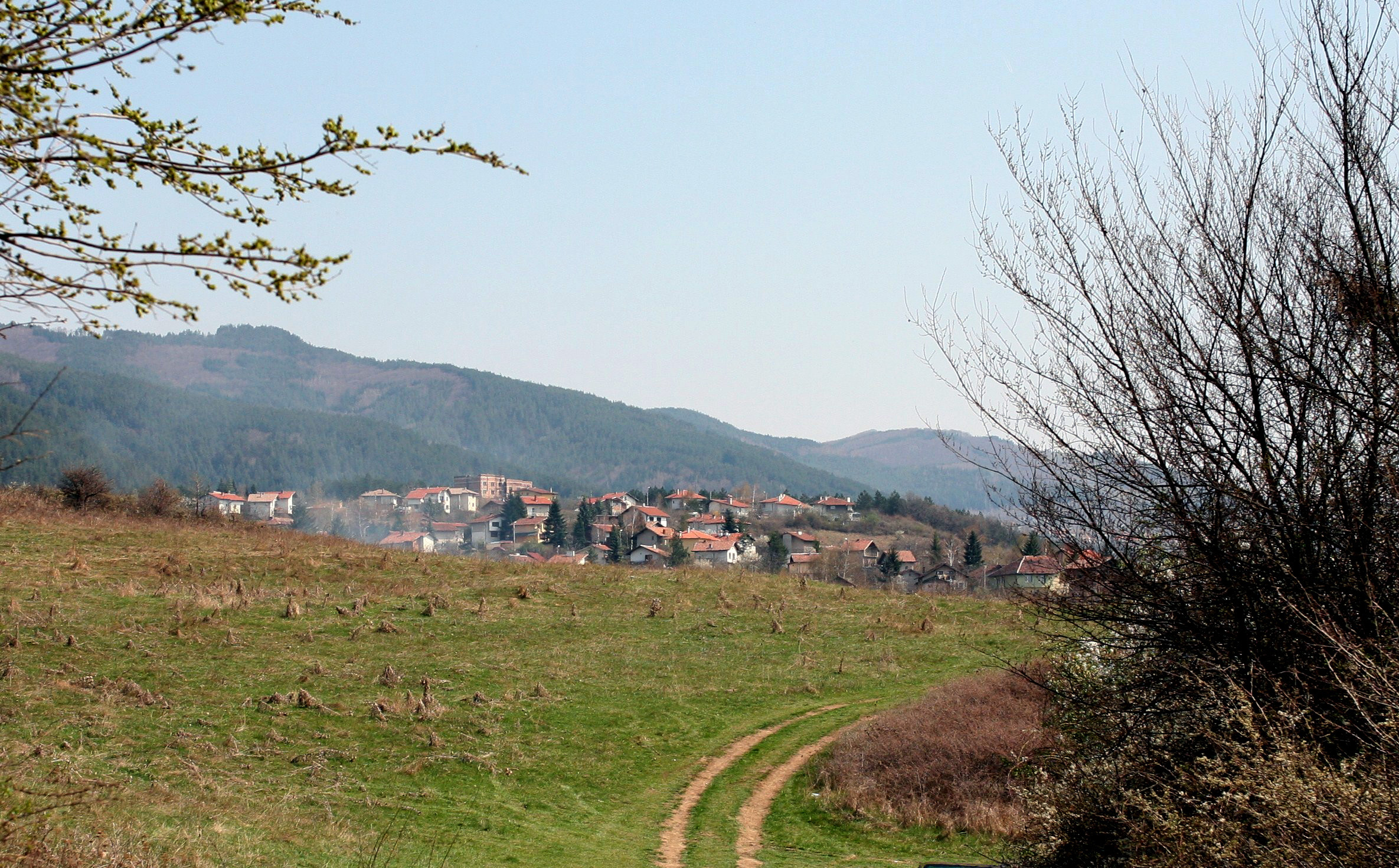
- View towards Rudartsi Village

- Location within Bulgaria
- Coordinates: 42.580857°N 23.167722°E
- Country: Bulgaria
- Province: Pernik Province
- Municipality: Pernik Municipality

Government
  - Mayor: Pantalei Yankov

Area
  - Total: 8,466 km^{2} (3,269 sq mi)
- Elevation: 786 m (2,579 ft)

Population
  - Total: 1,528
- Postal code: 2343
- Area code: 07713

Rudartsi is a village in Southern Bulgaria. The village is located in Pernik Municipality, Pernik Province. Аccording to the numbers provided by the 2020 Bulgarian census, Rudartsi currently has a population of 1528 people with a permanent address registration in the settlement.

== Geography ==
Rudartsi village is located in Pernik Municipality, and lies on the western hills of Vitosha mountain, at an average elevation of 786 meters. Until the year 1960, the village existed only as a neighborhood of a nearby village.

Rudartsi village is 18 kilometers from Sofia and 14 kilometers from Pernik.

== Infrastructure ==
The village has good infrastructure, a school, a library, and public transport to Pernik and Sofia. There is a mineral swimming pool in the village alongside mineral springs. There are 10 cafes and restaurant establishments.

- There is an elementary school in the village – "Sv. Kliment Ohridski"
- The community hall and library "Vasil Levski" was built in 1968.

== Ethnicity ==
According to the Bulgarian population census in 2011.

	Number	Percentage(in %)
Total	1362	100.00
Bulgarians	1277	93
Turks	0	0
Romani	23	2
Others	5	1
Do not define themselves	7	1
Unanswered	50	3
