= Bankya Mineral Baths =

Coordinates: 42.7067701°N 23.1442857°E

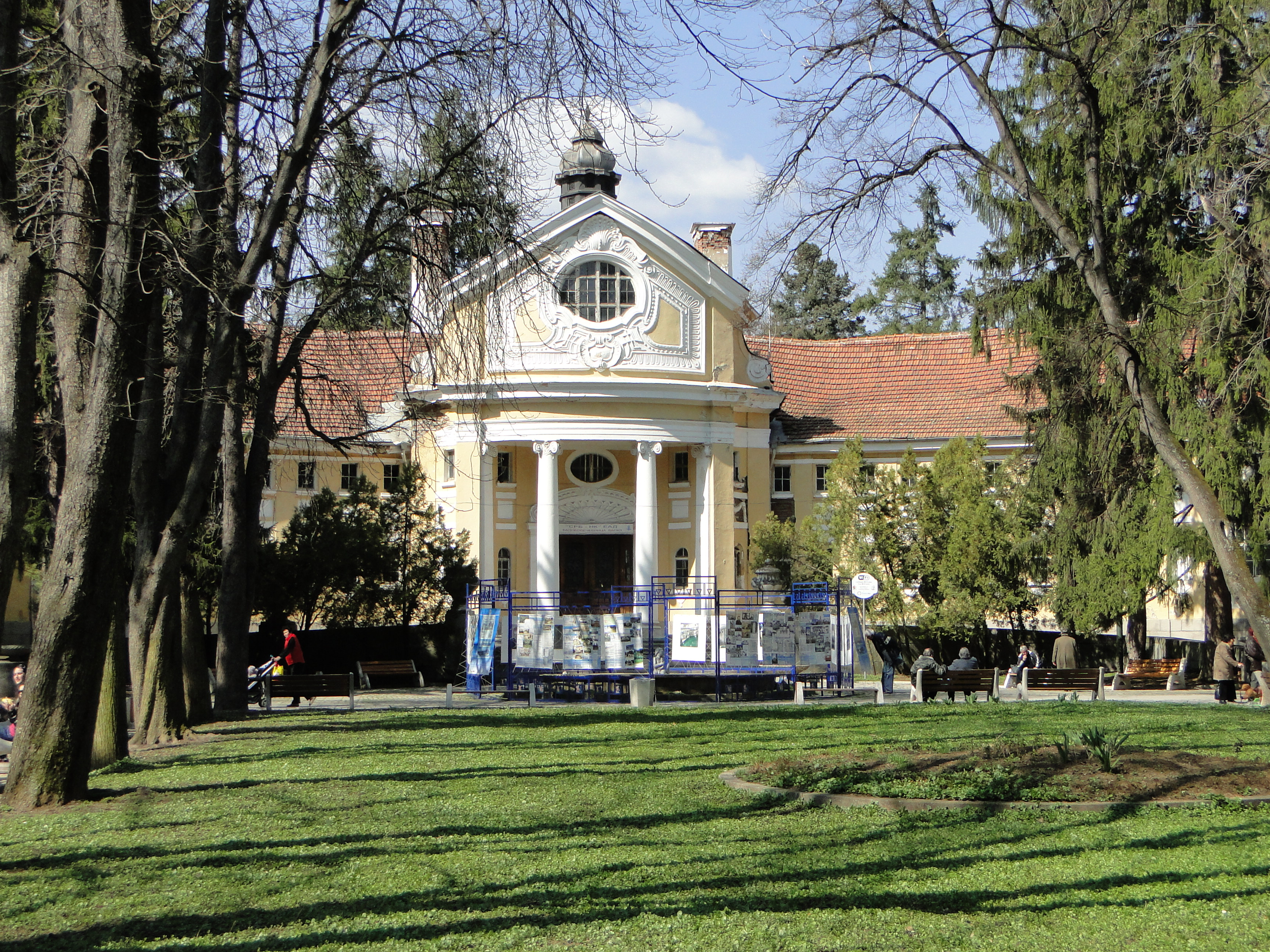
The Bankya Mineral Baths pre-renovation

The Bankya Mineral Baths (Bulgarian: Минерална баня „Банкя“, Mineralna banya „Bankya“), also known as the Great Baths and the Royal Baths, is a medicinal bath in the spa resort town of Bankya on the outskirts of Sofia, Bulgaria. The facility was designed by Bavarian architect prof. Carl Hocheder as the first modern spa facility in Bulgaria. Construction started in 1907 and the baths were opened to the public on 24 May 1911. The building was fully renovated starting in 2018 and reopened in October 2022.
