= Kladnitsa =

- Village
- Kladnitsa
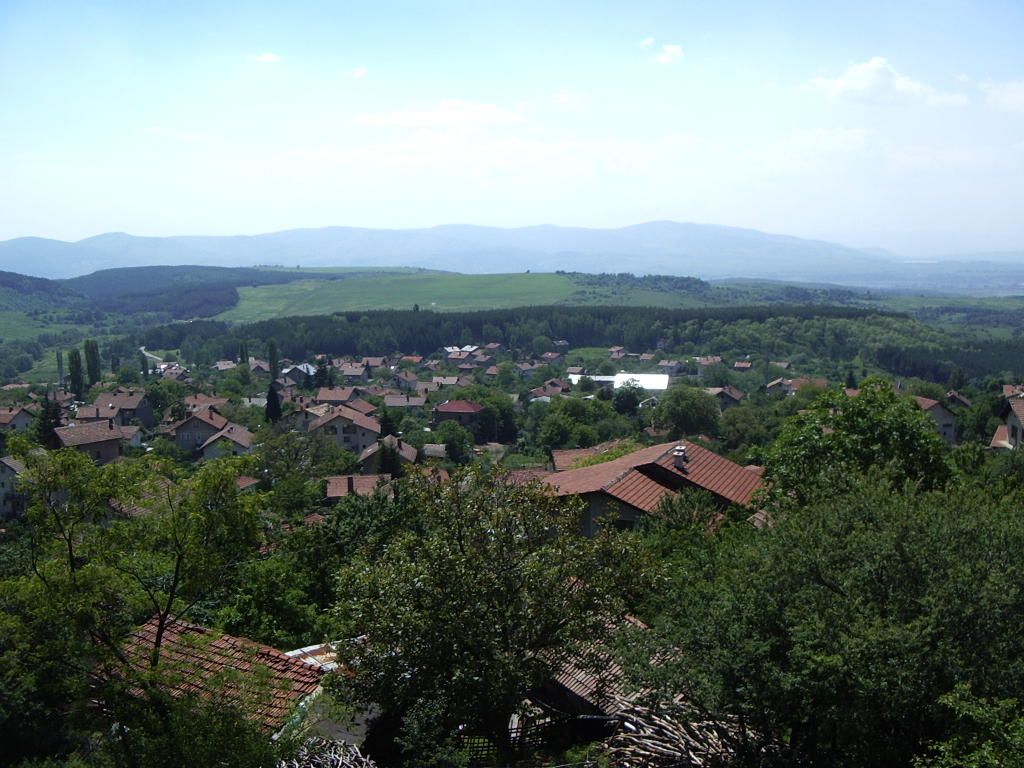
- Kladnitsa Village view

- Location within Bulgaria
- Coordinates: 42.568002°N 23.179621°E
- Country: Bulgaria
- Province: Pernik Province
- Municipality: Pernik Municipality

Government
  - Mayor: Vasil Mirchev

Area
  - Total: 15.414 km^{2} (5.951 sq mi)
- Elevation: 999 m (3,278 ft)

Population
  - Total: 1,277
- Postal code: 2347
- Area code: 07711

Kladnitsa is a village in Southern Bulgaria. The village is located in Pernik Municipality, Pernik Province. Аccording to the numbers provided by the 2020 Bulgarian census, Kladnica currently has a population of 1277 people with a permanent address registration in the settlement.

== Geography ==
Kladnitsa village is located in the Southern parts of Vitosha mountain. Some mountain routes leading to Cherni Vrah, the highest peak in the mountain pass through the village, making it an attractive tourist destination.

Dam Studena is 4 kilometers from the village.

It is one of the oldest villages in the mountain. It is located at an average elevation of 999 meters. The village is located 22 kilometers away from the capital Sofia, and 16 kilometers away from Pernik.

=== Buildings ===
- There is an elementary school "Kliment Ohridski" in the village.
- The community hall and library "Probuda" was built in 1937.

=== Mountain routes ===
Many of the mountain routes from the capital Sofia in the Vitosha mountain pass through Kladnitsa village.

Two of them start from Boyana District, pass through the village, and head for Cherni Vrah. There is the Kladnishka river, which passes near the village, which also makes it an attractive place for hiking.

== Ethnicity ==
According to the Bulgarian population census in 2011.

	Number	Percentage(in %)
Total	1202	100.00
Bulgarians	1030	86
Turks	0	0
Romani	0	0
Others	4	0.3
Do not define themselves	3	0.2
Unanswered	163	13
