= Leskovets, Pernik Province =

Leskovets Лесковец
- Village
- Location of Leskovets
- Coordinates: 42°35′32″N 22°54′50″E
- Country: Bulgaria
- Province (Oblast): Pernik
- Municipality (Obshtina): Pernik
- First mentioned: 1576

Government
  - Mayor: Rumen Ivanov

Area
  - Land: 13,884 km^{2} (5,361 sq mi)
- Elevation: 730 m (2,400 ft)

Population (2020)
  - Total: 81
- Time zone: UTC+2 (EET)
  - Summer (DST): UTC+3 (EEST)
- Postal Code: 2342
- License plate: PK

Leskovets (Bulgarian: Лесковец, also transliterated Leskovec) is a village in western Bulgaria. Its located in Pernik Province, Pernik Municipality.

== Geography ==
The village of Leskovets is located in a mountainous region. Its located 2.5 km west of Batanovtsi.

== Cultural and natural landmarks ==
Below the village there is a dam called Bushlyak, above the village is the Kavatsite dam, and even higher is the Lobosh dam.

In the village there is a ZOO - Alis.

== Name ==
The name derives from Leska, which means Hazel in Bulgarian + the Slavic suffix -ets.

== Political situation ==
The village shares a mayor with the neighbouring village of Planinitsa.
