= Yardzhilovtsi =

Village in Bulgaria

Coordinates: 42°37′58″N 22°56′27″E

- Village
- Yardzhilovtsi
- Location within Bulgaria
- Country: Bulgaria
- Province: Pernik Province
- Municipality: Pernik Municipality

Government
  - Mayor: Rositsa Lazarova

Area
  - Total: 16.143 km^{2} (6.233 sq mi)
- Elevation: 699 m (2,293 ft)

Population
  - Total: 927
- Postal code: 2355

Yardzhilovtsi (Bulgarian: Ярджиловци) is the largest village in Pernik Municipality of Bulgaria. It is situated on the road from Pernik to Trun and 40 km east of the Serbian border. The world weightlifting champion Yoto Yotov is a native of the village.

The village's carnival troop, the survashkari, perform in an international festival of "parade games" held in Pernik.
