= Lyulin Mountain =

Mountain range in Bulgaria

Lyulin
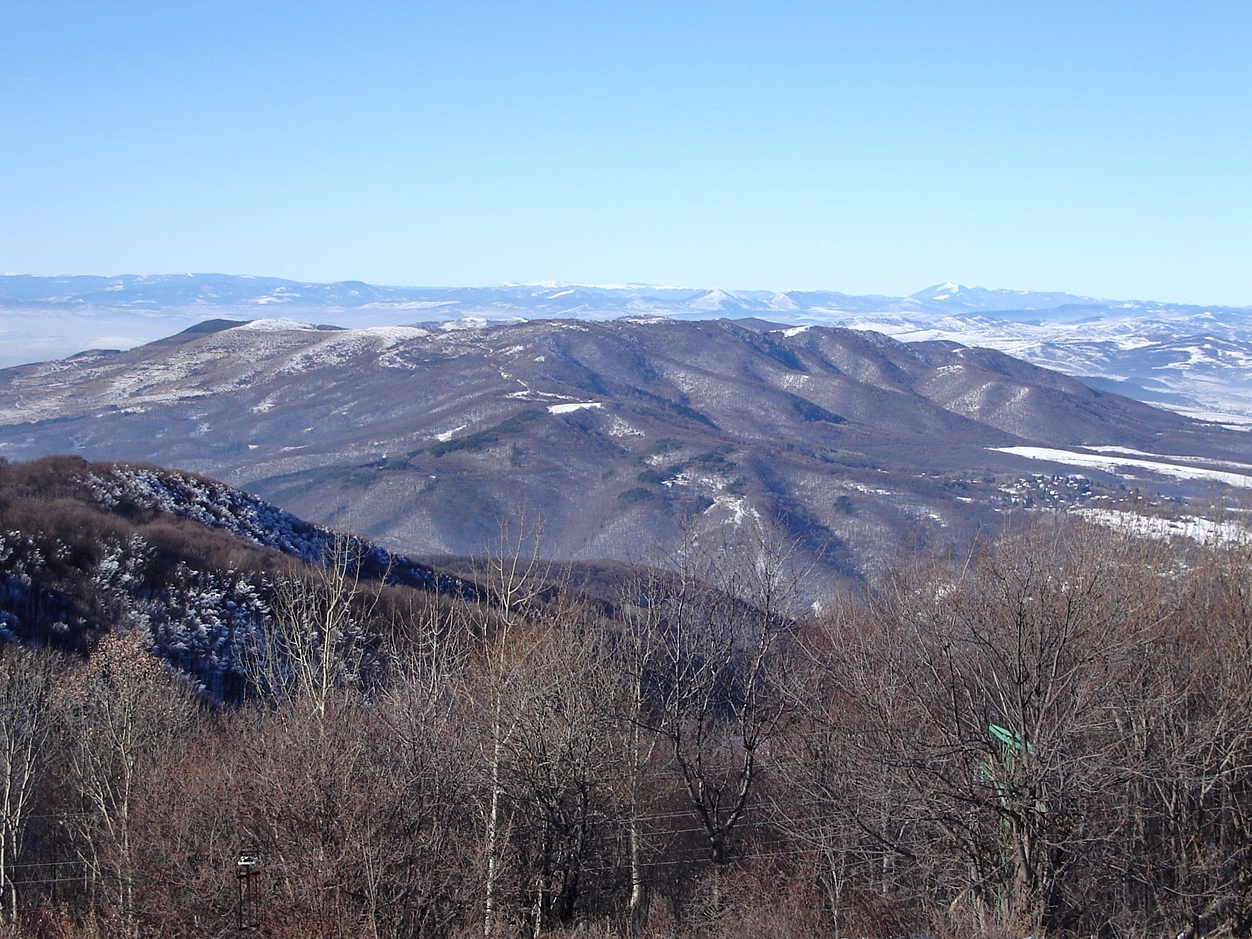
- Lyulin seen from Vitosha

Highest point
- Elevation: 1,256 m (4,121 ft)
- Coordinates: 42°39′N 23°9′E

Naming
- Native name: Люлин (Bulgarian)

Geography
- Location within Bulgaria
- Location: Bulgaria

Lyulin (Bulgarian: Люлин) is a mountain range in western Bulgaria with an altitude of 1,256 meters above sea level. It is part of the Srednogorie mountain system that from west to east includes the mountain ranges of Greben, Zavalska Planina, Viskyar, Lyulin, Vitosha, Plana and Sredna Gora. Lyulin Peak on Livingston Island in the South Shetland Islands, Antarctica is named after it.

== Geography ==
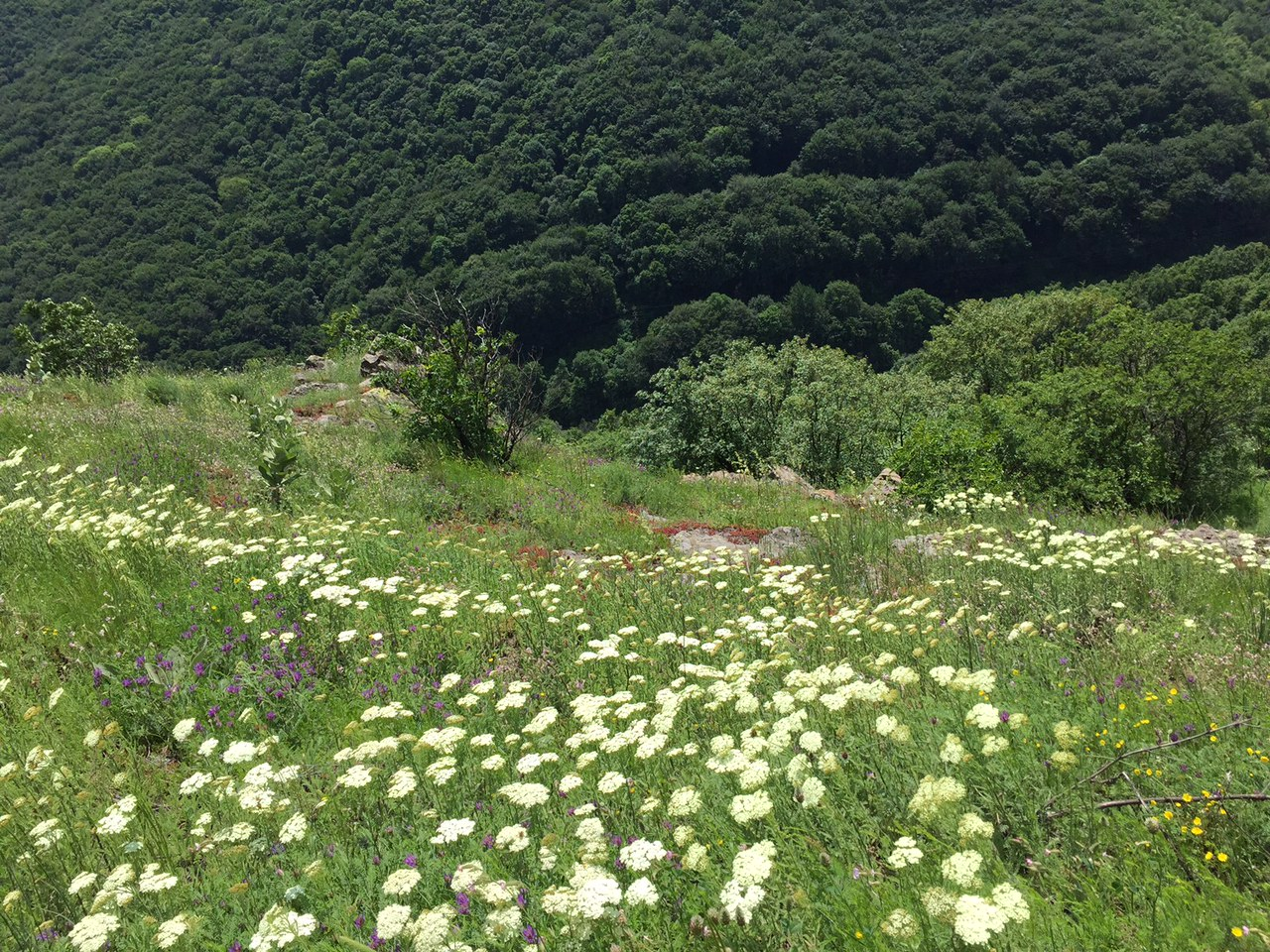
Forest and meadow of Achillea millefolium in Lyulin

Lyulin is situated between the Sofia Valley to the northeast, the Breznik Valley to the west, and the Pernik Valley to the southwest. To the northwest the Raduy Saddle (830 m) links it with Viskyar and to the southeast the Vladaya Pass links it to Vitosha. Its length in northwest–southeast direction is about 20 km; the width is 12–13 km.

The main ridge of the mountain range is flat and rises to some 1,100–1,200 m asl with several rounded summits protruding from its crest. The highest one is Dupevitsa (1,256 m), situated in its southeasternmost part. The northeastern slopes facing the Sofia Valley are steeper, while those to the southwest towards the Pernik Valley are oblique. The Buchin Pass south of the town of Bankya divides Lyulin in two — a larger lower northwestern section and a smaller higher southeastern part.

Lyulin is built up of limestones, tuffs, tuffites and andesites. The main watershed divide of the Balkan Peninsula, separating the Black Sea drainage basin to the north and the Aegean Sea one to the south, runs along the mountain range. The southwestern slopes are drained by several small rights tributaries of the Struma; the northeastern area is drained by left tributaries of the Iskar. The predominant soils are cinnamon and brown forest soils. Lyulin is covered with deciduous forests and pastures to the southeast and is mostly deforested to the northwest.

== Settlements and transport ==
There are two cities and ten villages along the foothills of Lyulin. On its northeastern slopes facing the Sofia Valley are situated several neighbourhoods of the national capital Sofia — Suhodol, Gorna Banya and Knyazhevo. On the northern slopes are the town of Bankya and the villages of Ivanyane, Klisura, Mala Rakovitsa and Malo Buchino. To the northwest is Radui and to the southeast is Vladaya. On the southwestern slopes are located Golemo Buchino, Divotino, Dragichevo and Lyulin. There are two monasteries.

Lyulin is traversed by several important transport routes. A section of the Struma motorway (A3) linking Sofia with southwestern Bulgaria and Greece runs through the Buchin Pass; that section was originally designated as a separate motorway named after the mountain range, before it was merged with the Struma motorway in 2018. A 14.7 km stretch of the first class I-6 road Gyueshevo–Sofia–Karlovo–Burgas traverses the southeastern foothills via the Vladaya Pass between Marchaevo and Knyazhevo. Lyulin is also crossed by a 14 km section of the third class III-602 road Pernik–Bankya–Sofia between Divotino and Bankya. The two passes that separate Lyulin from the neighbouring Viskyar and Vitosha are traversed by two railway lines, No. 5 Sofia–Blagoevgrad–Kulata via Vladaya Pass and No. 6 Voluyak–Pernik–Kyustendil–Gyueshevo via the Raduy Pass. Part of Lyulin is also accessible via bus lines of the Sofia Public Transport.

== Gallery ==
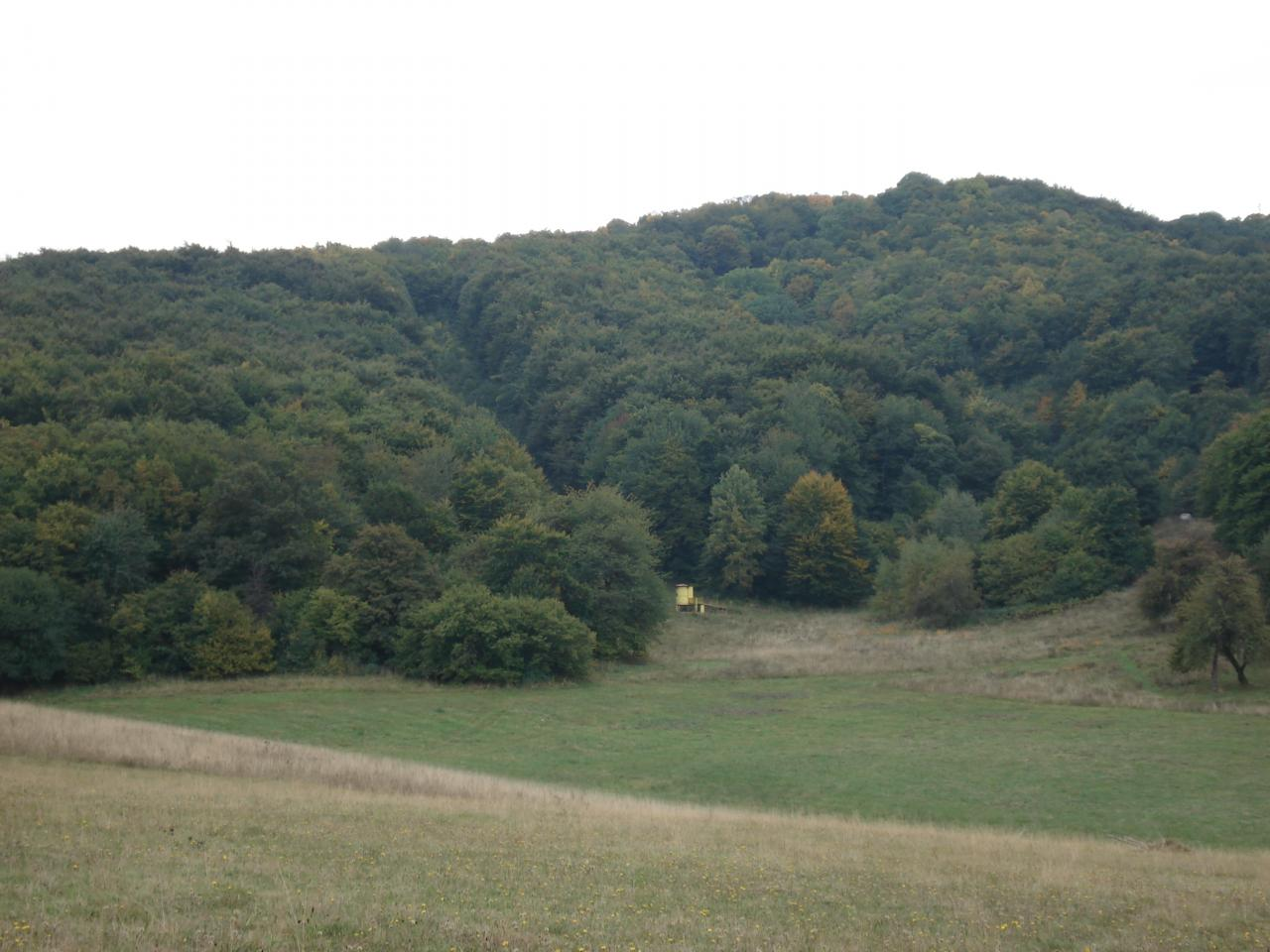
Forest and meadows in Lyulin

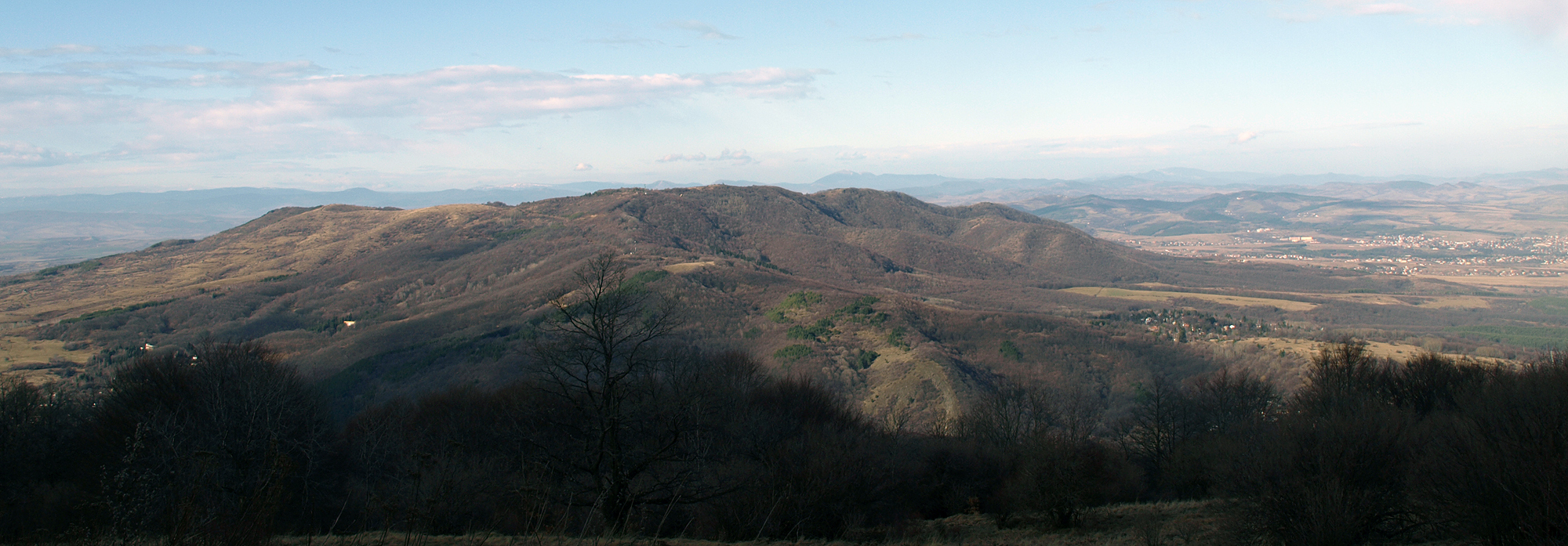
Panoramic view from Vitosha

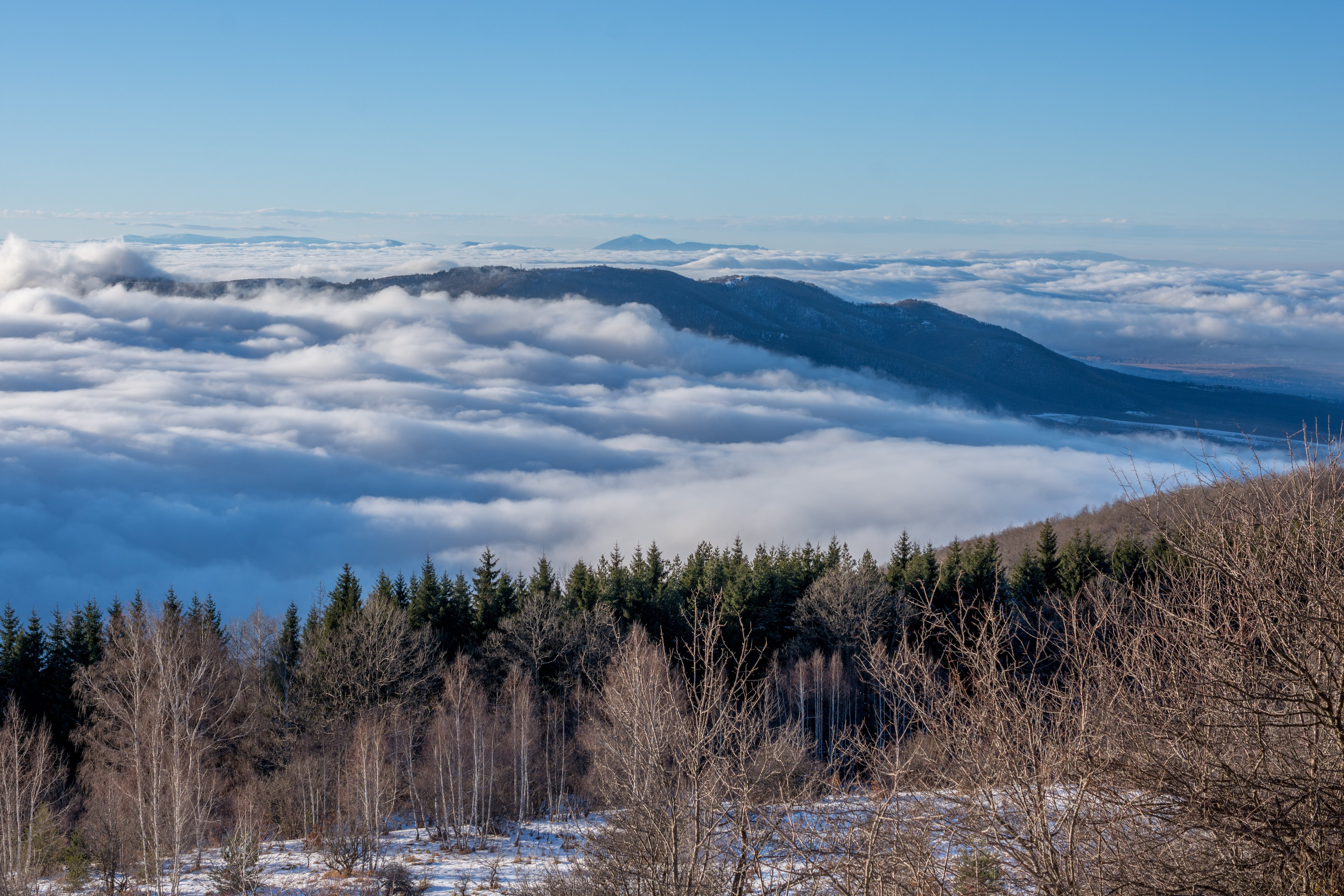
Lyulin seen from Vitosha

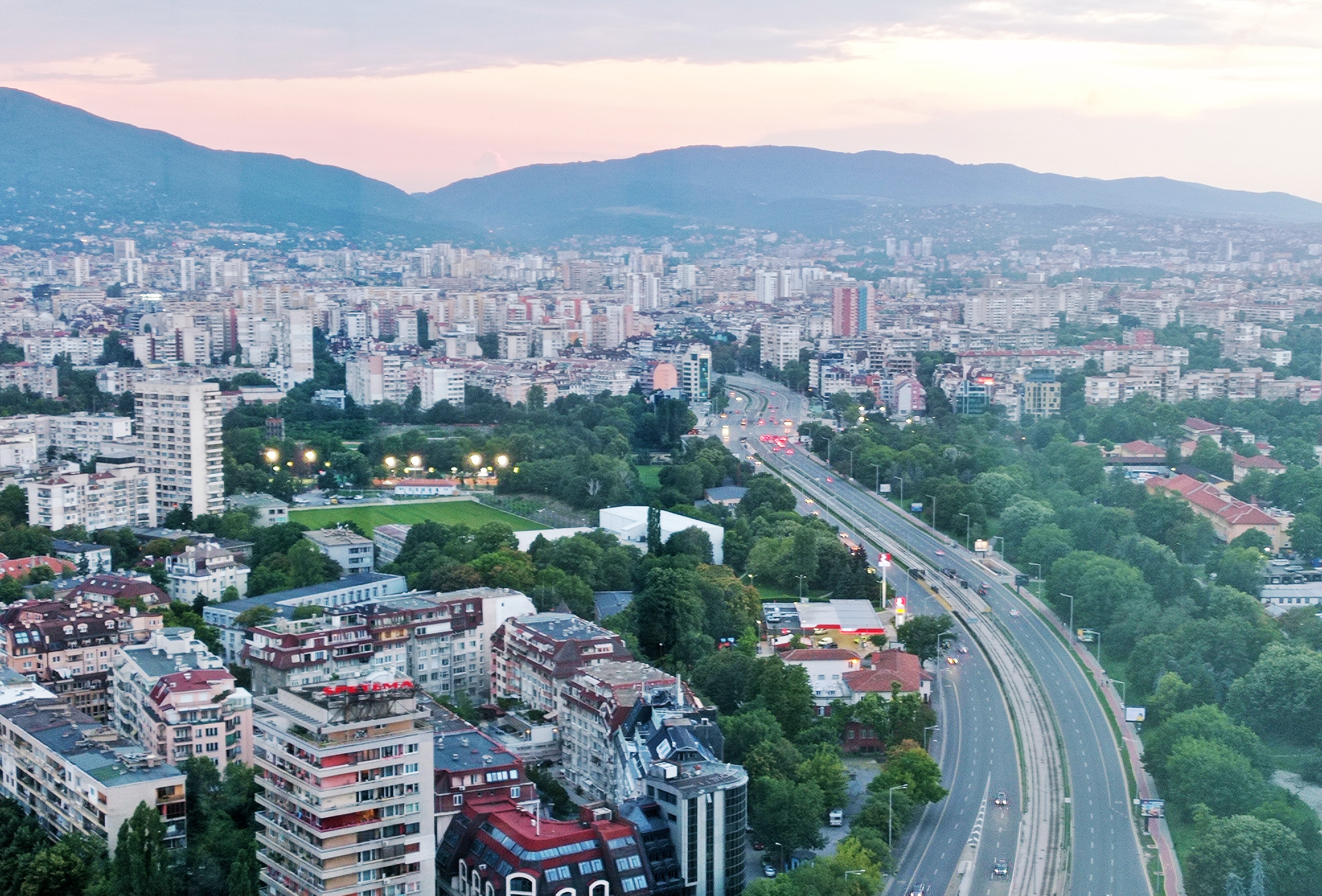
Lyulin seen from Sofia
