= Batanovtsi =

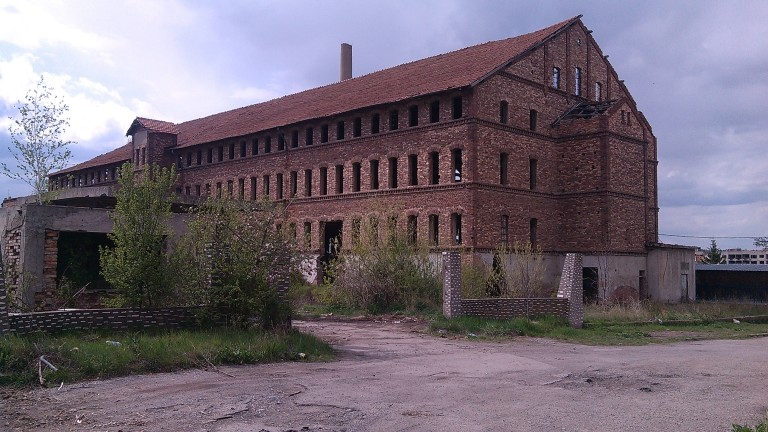
- Factory in Batanovtsi

- Location of Batanovtsi
- Coordinates: 42°36′N 22°57′E
- Country: Bulgaria
- Provinces (Oblast): Pernik

Government
  - Mayor: Radoslav Petrov
- Elevation: 660 m (2,170 ft)

Population (2020)
  - Total: 2,101
- Time zone: UTC+2 (EET)
  - Summer (DST): UTC+3 (EEST)
- Postal Code: 2340
- Area code: 07712

Batanovtsi (Bulgarian: Батановци, pronounced [ˈbatɐnoft͡si]) is a town in western Bulgaria. It is located in Pernik Province and is close to the towns of Radomir and Pernik.

== Geography ==
Its located between the towns of Pernik and Radomir. In the land of the town of Batanovtsi is the village of Cherna gora, which has no land of its own.

== History ==
The town's name was first attested in a 1564 Bulgarian text: ВИШЄ СЄЛА БАТЄНОВЦИ БЛИЗЬ РЄЦЄ СТРОУМЄ, and several other sources from the 1560s. It is derived from the personal name Batan, probably of Pecheneg or Cuman origin. From 1950 to 1992 it was known as Temelkovo. It was proclaimed a town in 1974.

== Religion ==
Eastern orthodoxy

== Notable people ==
- Asen Daskalov (1899 – 1925), revolutionary
