= Southern Bulgaria =

Southern region of Bulgaria

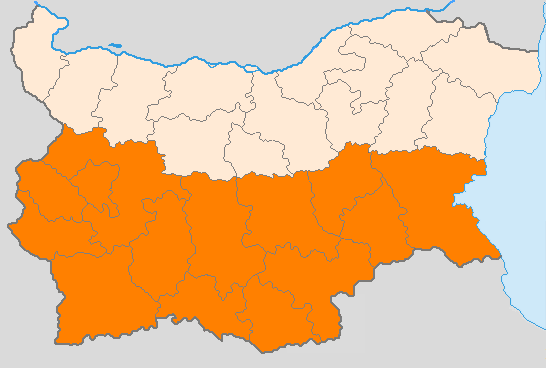
Southern Bulgaria (orange)

Southern Bulgaria (Bulgarian: Южна България, Yuzhna Balgariya) is the southern half of the territory of Bulgaria, located to the south of the main ridge of the Balkan Mountains which conventionally separates the country into a northern and a southern part. Besides the Balkan Mountains, Southern Bulgaria borders Serbia to the west, North Macedonia to the southwest, Greece to the south, Turkey to the southeast and the Bulgarian Black Sea Coast to the east.

Geographically, the terrain in Southern Bulgaria is much more varied than that of the north, with the Upper Thracian Plain stretching in the east, while the south and west are dominated by some of Bulgaria's highest mountains such as Rila, Pirin and the Rhodopes, as well as smaller and/or lower mountains and valleys in the west, such as Vitosha, Belasitsa, Osogovo, the Sofia Valley, the Sub-Balkan valleys and the Kraishte region. Southern Bulgaria covers an area of 62,414 square kilometres and has a population of 5,085,872 as of 2009 (63% of Bulgaria's entire population), with a population density of 81.5 people per km^{2}. The three largest cities are the national capital Sofia, the largest city in Thrace, Plovdiv, and the major Black Sea port of Burgas.

Administratively, Southern Bulgaria includes the following 14 Bulgarian provinces:

- Blagoevgrad Province
- Burgas Province
- Haskovo Province
- Kardzhali Province
- Kyustendil Province
- Pazardzhik Province
- Pernik Province
- Plovdiv Province
- Sliven Province
- Smolyan Province
- Sofia City Province
- Sofia Province
- Stara Zagora Province
- Yambol Province

Historically, Southern Bulgaria covers the historical regions of Thrace and Macedonia (Pirin Macedonia). The Bulgarian South also has a number of often unclearly defined or overlapping sub-regions, particularly in the west and southwest, such as Chech, Shop region, Kraishte, Burel, Visok, Zabardie, Znepole, Graovo, Osogoviya, Piyanets, Podgorie, Razlog, Rupchos, Tamrash, etc. Southern Bulgaria is also conventionally divided into Southwestern, Central Southern and Southeastern Bulgaria, with slightly varying borders.

In Antiquity, the Jireček Line divided Latin (in the north) and Ancient Greek (in the south) language influence in the Balkans, with Northern Bulgaria to the north of it and Southern Bulgaria to the south. Much later, after the Liberation of Bulgaria in 1878, all of Northern Bulgaria and the region of Sofia became the Principality of Bulgaria while most of the rest of Southern Bulgaria was part of Eastern Rumelia until the Bulgarian unification in 1885. Pirin Macedonia became part of Bulgaria after the Treaty of Bucharest of 1913, and the only Bulgarian gains by the otherwise catastrophic post-World War I Treaty of Neuilly-sur-Seine of 1919 were two small strips of land in southern Sakar.

== Gallery ==
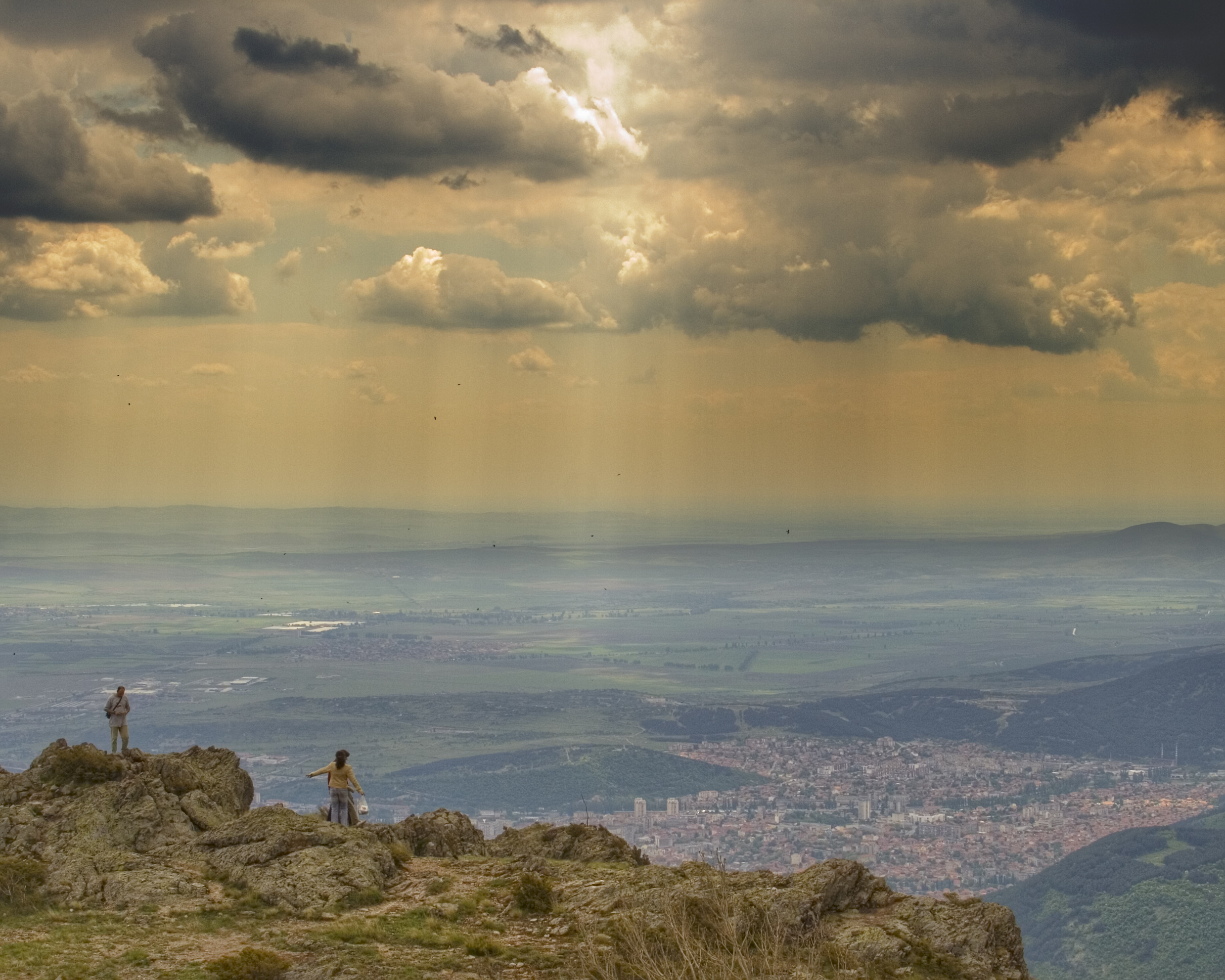
Overview of the Upper Thracian Plain

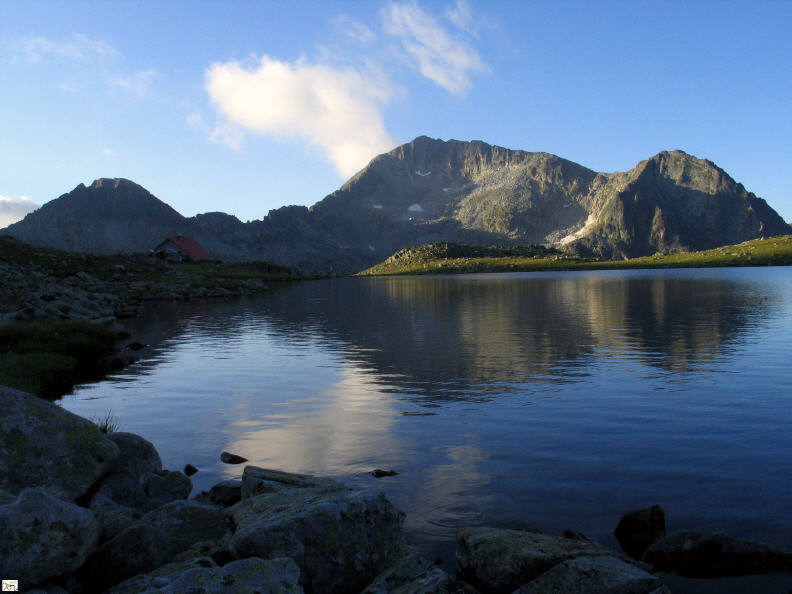
Kamenitsa Peak in Pirin

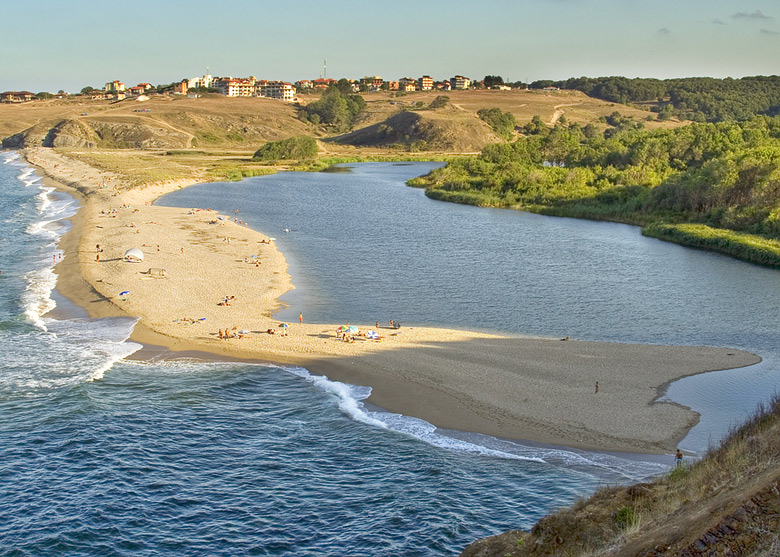
The southeastern Bulgarian Black Sea Coast

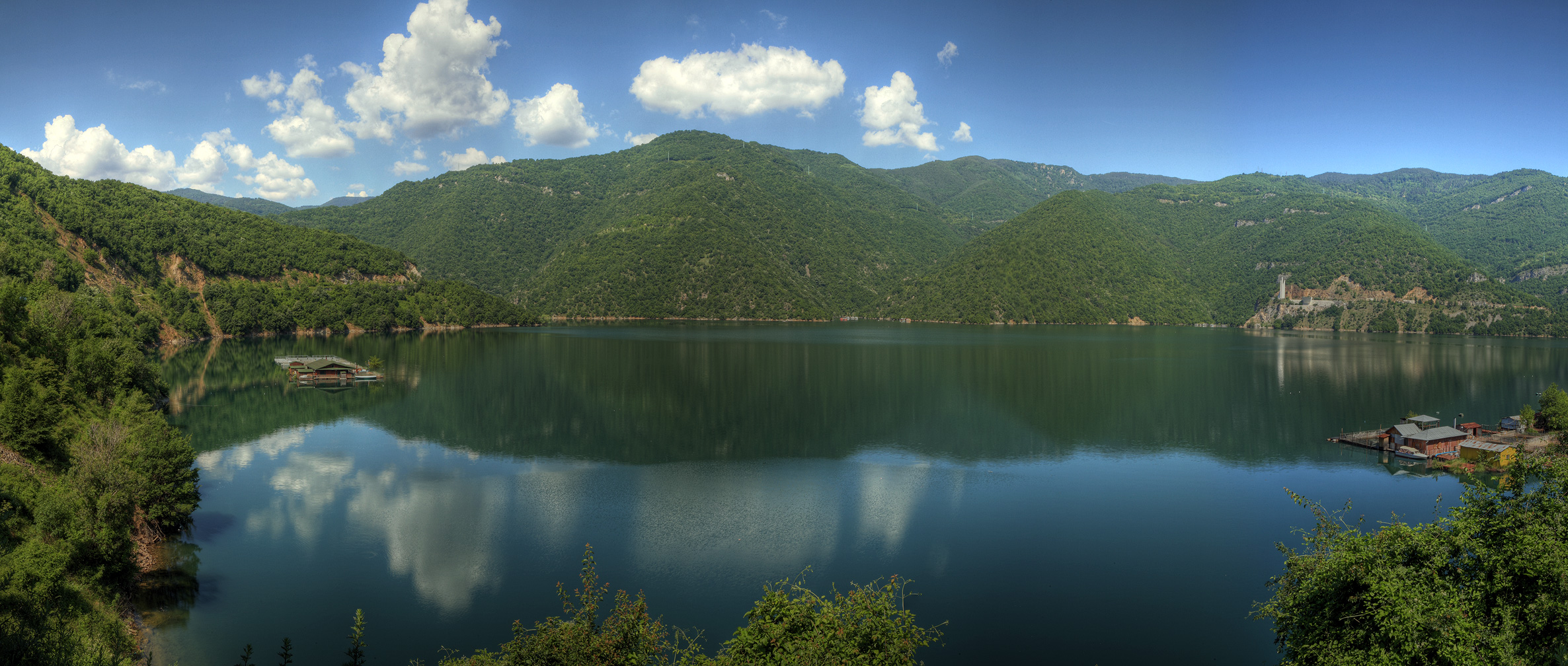
Vacha Dam in the Rhodopes

== See also ==
- Northern Bulgaria
