= Siege of Přibyslav =

- Part of the Hussite Wars
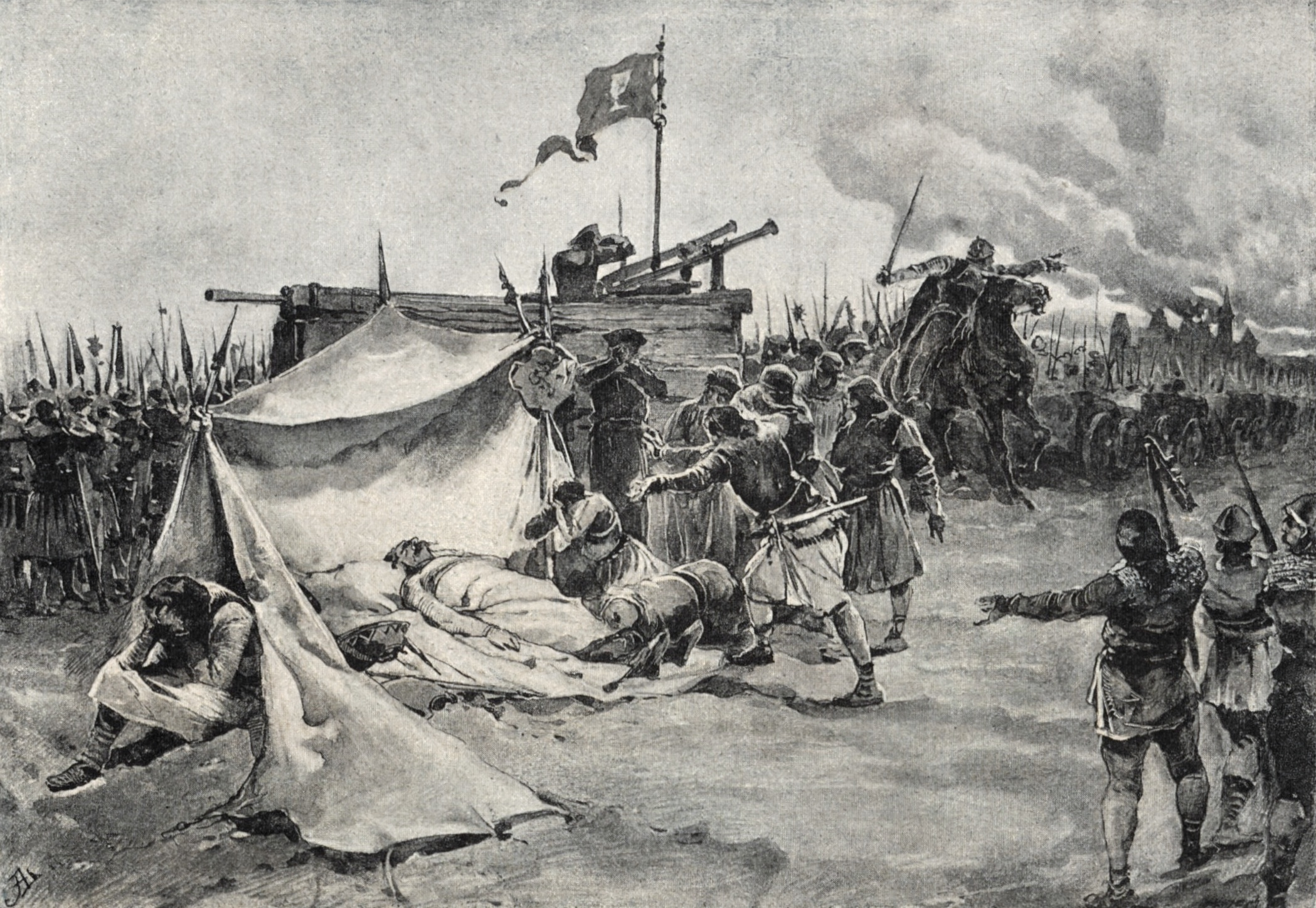
- The death of Jan Žižka, illustration by Adolf Liebscher
Date	October 1424
Location	Přibyslav, Kingdom of Bohemia
Result	Hussite victory

Belligerents
Hussites	Catholic defenders of Přibyslav

Commanders and leaders
Jan Žižka # Kuneš of Bělovice	Unknown

Strength
Unknown	Unknown

Casualties and losses
Unknown	Unknown, 60 burned to death

The Siege of Přibyslav took place in October 1424 during the Hussite Wars. Hussite forces led by Jan Žižka laid a siege on Přibyslav during their expedition in Moravia. The engagement is notable as Žižka died of an illness on 11 October 1424 while the siege was underway. Following his death, the Hussite forces continued the operation and captured the castle, which was subsequently burned and destroyed.

== Background ==
In 1424, the Hussite movement was divided by internal conflicts between different factions. Jan Žižka, who had established a military centre in eastern Bohemia, became involved in a conflict with the Prague Hussites and other groups. Following his victory at the Battle of Malešov on 7 June 1424, negotiations between the Hussite factions eventually resulted in an agreement to cooperate against their common enemies.

In the autumn of 1424, a Hussite army set out on an expedition towards Moravia, where forces loyal to Sigismund and his son-in-law Albert of Austria were operating.

During the expedition, Žižka turned towards Přibyslav. The castle and town belonged to Čeněk of Ronov. According to historians, Žižka sought to punish him for involvement in the persecution of Hussites during the earlier stages of the wars.

== Siege ==
The Hussite forces arrived in the area on 6 October 1424. On 7 October, they captured nearby Ronov Castle and began besieging Přibyslav which repelled the first attack. The town and its castle were defended by supporters of the Catholic nobility. Žižka himself set up a camp on what is known today as Žižkovo Pole.

On 11 October 1424, Jan Žižka died during the siege. The Old Czech Annals state that he became seriously ill with a condition described as hlíza (a swelling or abscess). According to František Josef Čečetka, Kuneš of Bělovice assumed leadership of the Hussite forces after Žižka's death.

Before his death, Žižka ordered his men to capture Přibyslav. Several days after his death, his men attacked Přibyslav and captured it. According to the chronicle, approximately sixty defenders were burned to death, and the castle was subsequently burned and destroyed.

== Aftermath ==
The capture of Přibyslav marked the end of the siege. The destruction of the castle contributed to the decline of its importance as a military stronghold. The town was also severely damaged during the Hussite attack.

Following Žižka's death, his followers became known as the Orphans (Sirotci), reflecting their loss of their commander, whom they regarded as a father figure. The Hussite movement continued to operate under new military leaders in the following years.

Žižka's body was initially buried in Hradec Králové and was later transferred to Čáslav.

== Death of Jan Žižka ==
The exact cause of Žižka's death remains uncertain. The contemporary chronicles describe his illness as being accompanied by swellings, which has traditionally been interpreted as a possible reference to the plague. However, the available historical evidence does not allow his exact cause of death to be established conclusively. Some historians and medical researchers have suggested that Žižka may have died from sepsis caused by a severe bacterial infection. The precise diagnosis remains disputed.

According to chronicler Piccolomini, Žižka's dying wish was to have his skin used to make drums so that he might continue to lead his troops even after death. Žižka was so highly regarded that when he died, his soldiers called themselves Sirotci ("the Orphans") because they felt as if they had lost their father. His enemies said that "The one whom no mortal hand could destroy was extinguished by the finger of God."

He was interred in the church of Saints Peter & Paul in Čáslav.
