= Battle of Kůzová =

- Part of the Hussite Wars
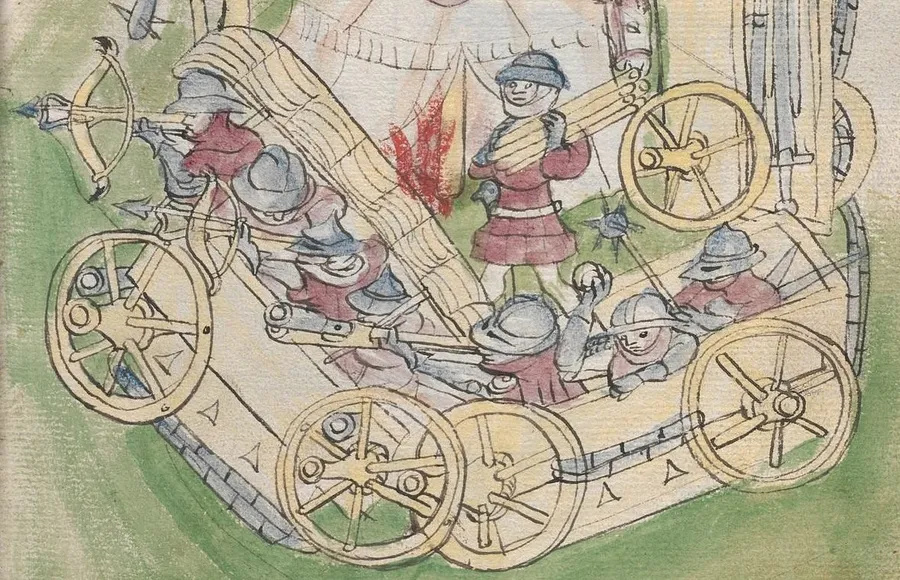
- Hussite Wagon fort
Date	c. 17 May 1424
Location	Near Kůzová, Bohemia
Result	Orderly Hussite withdrawal without a major field battle

Belligerents
Orebites (the union of Jan Žižka)	Pilsen Landfriede

Commanders and leaders
Jan Žižka; Jan Hvězda of Vícemilice	Vilém Švihovský of Rýzmburk; Hanuš of Kolowrat

Strength
Approximately 7,000 infantry 500 cavalry 300 war wagons	8,000–10,000 men

Casualties and losses
Unknown	Unknown

The Battle of Kůzová was a minor military engagement, or series of skirmishes, between the combined forces of the Eastern Bohemian Hussite Union under the command of the blind hetman Jan Žižka and the army of the Pilsen Landfriede during the Hussite Wars. It took place around 17 May 1424, near the village of Kůzová, close to Kralovice in northwestern Bohemia, between the Second and Third Crusades against the Hussites.

The fighting occurred during Žižka's withdrawal following an unsuccessful siege of Pilsen. The Hussites constructed defensive earthworks at their positions, and although skirmishes took place, no major field battle was fought. Žižka's army subsequently withdrew in good order towards Žatec, which was under Hussite control.

== Background ==
In July 1423, the Taborite hetman Jan Žižka took control of Hradec Králové, which belonged to the urban alliance led by Prague. He took advantage of the absence of the Prague army, which was campaigning in Moravia. Following the army's hurried return from the margraviate, the forces of the two Hussite factions fought at the Battle of Strauchův dvůr on 4 August, in which Žižka's troops were victorious.

The blind hetman subsequently began forming a new military alliance based on four towns: Hradec Králové, Jaroměř, Dvůr Králové nad Labem and Čáslav, together with a small permanent field army. In mid-October of the same year, representatives of the Bohemian capital summoned members of the moderate Utraquist and Catholic nobility to Prague for the so-called St. Gall's Assembly. Although the resolution adopted at the meeting did not explicitly name anyone, it was evidently directed primarily against Žižka.

Žižka continued his struggle against his domestic opponents. At the beginning of 1424, he defeated an army led by Půta III of Častolovice and Jan Městecký of Opočno at the Battle of Skalice, near the village of the same name close to Jaroměř. After 5 March, he marched into the regions around Jičín and Nový Bydžov. At the beginning of May, he organised a major expedition into the region around Pilsen.

== Course of the engagement ==
The events are described in the records of the Cistercian monk Johann Georg Vogt (1669–1730) of Plasy Abbey. The engagement is not directly mentioned in other chronicles, and some of the information provided by Vogt may be distorted.

Žižka's army, reportedly consisting of 500 cavalrymen, 7,000 infantrymen and 300 war wagons, first advanced towards Pilsen, an important Catholic stronghold in Bohemia, which it besieged briefly but unsuccessfully.

In response, the Pilsen Landfriede began assembling its forces. This alliance of Catholic nobles organised the local defence of extensive territories in western, southwestern and northwestern Bohemia. Its members included Hanuš of Kolowrat, Hanovec of Švamberk, Hynek Krušina of Švamberk, Vilém Švihovský of Rýzmburk, Burian Calta, Kalhot of Rabštejn and soldiers from the garrison of Pilsen.

After receiving reports that the Landfriede was gathering a force that may have numbered as many as 10,000 men, Žižka decided to withdraw northeast towards Žatec, a stronghold of the radical Hussites. Around the middle of May, the army of the Pilsen Landfriede approached the Orebite forces from the north, near the villages of Kůzová and Zdeslav.

Žižka wished to avoid an open battle. The Hussites therefore constructed earthworks from soil and stones at their positions, probably reinforced by a wagon fort. These defences prevented the effective deployment of the enemy's heavy cavalry.

Neither army was willing to launch a direct assault from its unfavourable position. Consequently, only limited skirmishes took place around 17 May. Shortly afterwards, Žižka's army succeeded in withdrawing in good order to Žatec.

As a consequence of the military operations in the region, the villages of Kůzová, Smrk, Lhota, Zdeslav and Drahouš were burned, as were Plaveč farmstead and the fortresses of Smrk and Hluboká. Kůzová remained abandoned for several centuries and was resettled only after the Thirty Years' War, in the second half of the seventeenth century.

No precise reports of the number of casualties have survived, although it can be assumed that both sides suffered some losses during the skirmishes.

== Aftermath ==
Contemporary sources provide no further direct information about Žižka's activities immediately after the engagement. He is mentioned again towards the end of May, when a section of the St Gall's coalition marched against him. Žižka's forces defeated this army at the Battle of Malešov, near Kutná Hora.

In September, Žižka marched with his army towards Prague, where a reconciliation between the Hussite factions was achieved. Immediately afterwards, accompanied by his closest companion Jan Hvězda of Vícemilice, he set out on a campaign in Moravia. On 11 October 1424, he died during the siege of Přibyslav.

In honour of their deceased leader, his soldiers subsequently adopted the name Orphans.

The Hussite defensive earthworks have survived in the landscape and can still be found in fields and woodland south of the road from Kůzová towards the settlement of Strachovice.

== See also ==
- Hussite Wars
- Orebites
