= Battle of Žlutice =

- Part of the Hussite Wars
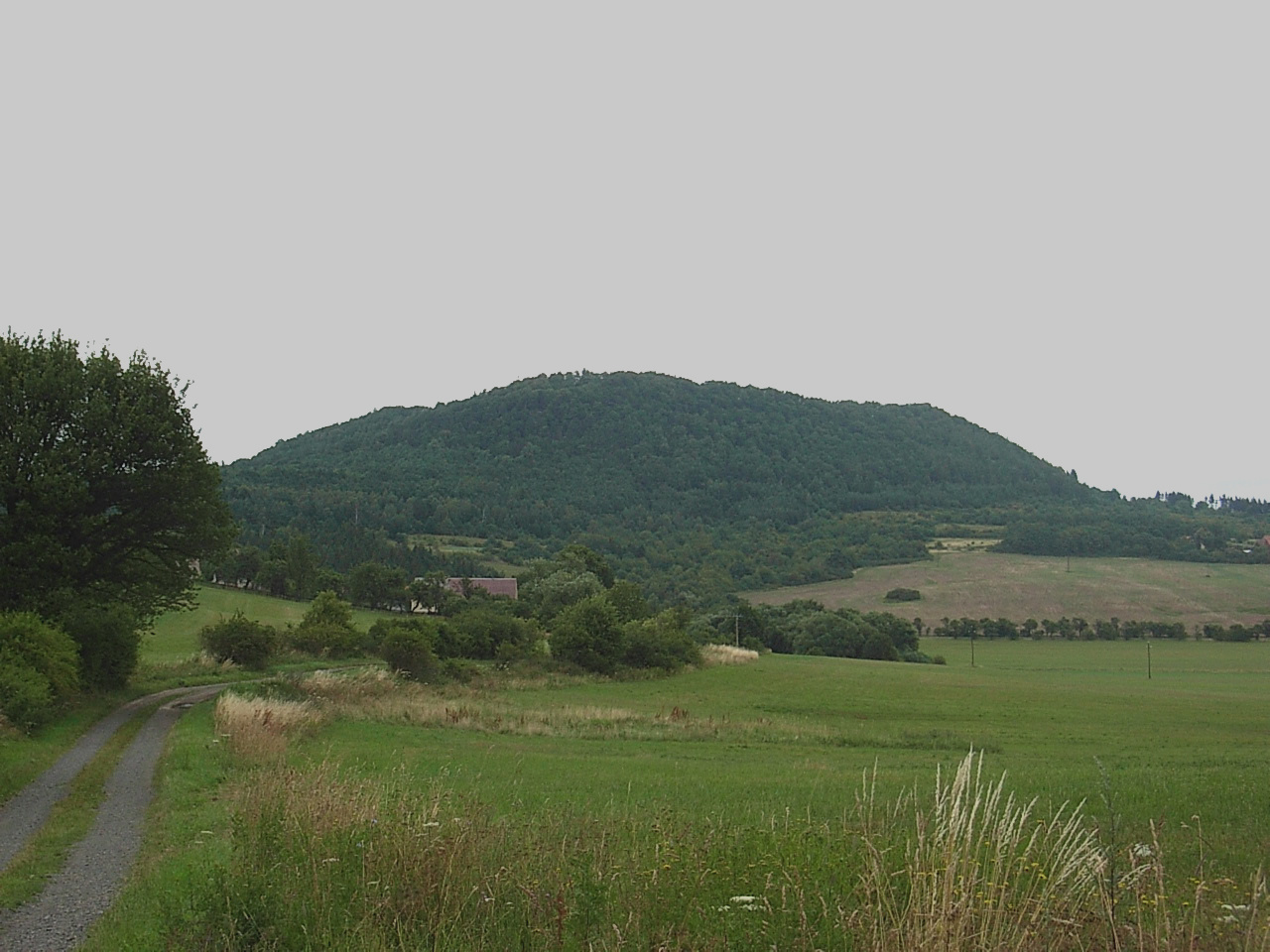
- Look at Vladař hill
Date	Second half of November 1421
Location	Vladař, near Žlutice, Bohemia
Result	Hussite tactical success; Žižka broke through the encirclement and withdrew to Žatec

Belligerents
Taborites; Forces from Žatec	Pilsen Landfriede; Czech Catholic nobility

Commanders and leaders
Jan Žižka	Henry of Plauen

Strength
1,400 infantry 400 cavalry	Unknown

Casualties and losses
Unknown	Unknown

The Battle of Žlutice probably took place in the second half of November 1421 on Vladař, a hill approximately 5 km southeast of the town of Žlutice in Bohemia. The Hussites, commanded by the blind military leader Jan Žižka, defended themselves for three days against a numerically superior force consisting of troops of the Pilsen Landfriede and soldiers commanded by the Saxon nobleman Henry of Plauen, lord of Kynžvart. On the third day, owing to a shortage of supplies, the Hussites broke through the encirclement and withdrew to Žatec.

== Prelude ==
There is little historical evidence concerning the military activities of the blind Hussite commander Jan Žižka during the autumn of 1421. His letter to the inhabitants of Domažlice is dated 12 September and, if the date is correct, suggests that he was organising new forces to fight against the troops of the Second Crusade against the Hussites. However, the Hussite Chronicle by the writer Lawrence of Březová mentions Žižka only towards the end of the month, when he relieved Lomnice from a siege, burned several fortresses on the left bank of the Vltava and captured Soběslav, where he burned the Rosenberg castle and damaged the walls of the town and its church.

On 14 October, Žižka attacked the fortress of Ostrov on the Nežárka, which had been taken over by the Adamites in late summer. After a fierce battle, he captured approximately forty men and women, whom he subsequently had burned to death.

A few days later, Žižka turned his attention to Krasíkov Castle, which had been besieged by troops of the Pilsen Landfriede. The fortress had formerly belonged to Bohuslav of Švamberk, the former commander of the Pilsen Landfriede, who was then serving as an ally of Žižka's army. (Note: After the capture of Krasíkov, Bohuslav of Švamberk was imprisoned by the Hussites at Příběnice Castle, where he became acquainted with Hussite theology and converted to it. During the operations around Krasíkov, he opposed his own brother, who was serving in the Catholic army.)

The attempt to relieve the fortress failed because a detachment commanded by Henry of Plauen arrived to reinforce the besiegers. The Hussites managed only to deliver supplies to the defenders before withdrawing. After this setback, Žižka retreated towards Klatovy, which he left around 10 November at the head of 1,500 infantrymen and 400 mounted fighters. The surviving sources indicate that the campaign into the Pilsen region encountered strong resistance from an enemy that had prepared for the Hussite advance.

== Battle ==
=== Contemporary accounts ===
The most important written source concerning the events of late November 1421 is the Hussite Chronicle, written by Lawrence of Březová, a master of the arts faculty at the University of Prague and a direct contemporary of the Hussite Wars.

Lawrence describes the events as follows:

But when the aforementioned lord of Plauen arrived with several hundred horsemen, Žižka hurried with his band towards Žatec. The enemy, namely the army of Pilsen together with the lord of Plauen, constantly pursued him, and on the march they frequently engaged in skirmishes.

When Žižka and his men reached a place near Žlutice, at a mountain called Vladař, he ascended it with his wagons and horsemen, surrounded himself and his men with the wagons, and, having prepared his artillery, defended himself against the enemy, although he and his men suffered from the inclement weather, frost, violent winds and hunger. For three days they defended themselves courageously, and the enemy was unable to gain free access to the mountain. After three days, because of the hunger suffered by both men and horses, they descended from the mountain and forcefully made their way towards Žatec. The inhabitants of Žatec came out to meet them and escorted them into their town.

— Lawrence of Březová

The battle is also mentioned in a short biography of Jan Žižka written by an unknown author, probably during the reign of King George of Poděbrady. The work is known as the Chronicle of the Very Fine Life of Jan Žižka, Servant of King Wenceslaus (Kronika velmi pěkná o Janu Žižkovi čeledínu krále Václava).

The account states:

Then Žižka, recovered from his illness but blind in both eyes, marched into the Pilsen region. The Czechs and Germans gathered against him. There Žižka fought at Planá. When his situation became very difficult, he withdrew several miles, fully armed. There he freed himself from his enemies and went with his army to a very high mountain. Many men fell on both sides.

— Chronicle of the Very Fine Life of Jan Žižka

A monument commemorating the battle stands below Vladař.

=== Probable course of the battle ===
According to these accounts, the first major engagement between the two sides probably took place at Planá. It is not known which side emerged victorious. After the fighting, however, the Taborite forces set out towards Žatec, one of the principal Hussite strongholds.

During frequent skirmishes with their pursuers, the Hussites passed through Bezdružice and Nečtiny and eventually sought refuge on Vladař, approximately 5 km southeast of Žlutice. Since the written sources do not establish the duration of the army's march, it is impossible to determine whether Žižka deliberately chose the hill as a suitable place for a night's rest or whether the main enemy force caught up with him there.

On the slopes or summit of the conical basalt hill, the Hussites constructed a wagon fort and successfully repelled enemy attacks for three days.

Lawrence of Březová's description makes clear that the Hussites suffered from severe weather conditions. The same conditions, however, also affected their opponents. For the Hussites, the shortage of provisions was a more serious problem than the violent winds and frost. By the third day, their situation had probably become critical, prompting the blind commander to launch a counterattack intended to break through the encirclement and continue towards Žatec.

It is likely that preparations for this successful operation, as well as the fighting itself, took place after sunset, since darkness would have offered the Hussites the best opportunity to surprise their opponents and achieve the greatest possible advantage.

== Aftermath ==
It is impossible to determine with certainty why the Catholic nobles did not continue their pursuit of the Hussites. One likely explanation is that they were exhausted after three days of fighting in difficult conditions. They may also have received information about a detachment sent from Žatec to assist the Hussites.

Accompanied by the inhabitants of Žatec, the Taborites reached the town, where Žižka was already awaiting a request from Prague to join a campaign against the forces of the Second Crusade against the Hussites, which were preparing to cross the border between Moravia and Bohemia.
