= Szalonna =

Szalonna can refer to:

- Szalonna (bacon), Hungarian bacon usually cooked on a stick over a campfire
- Szalonna (town), in Hungary
