= Peace of Špitál Field =

The Peace of Špitál Field, also known as the Treaty of Libeň, was a diplomatic agreement concluded on 14 September 1424 outside the walls of the New Town of Prague. It brought a temporary end to internal hostilities between two major factions of the Hussite movement: the Prague Hussites and Prince Sigismund Korybut on one side, and Jan Žižka and his followers on the other.

== Background ==
The Hussites, organised into several military and political unions, were still able to cooperate effectively in early 1423, when they jointly won the Battle of Hořice. However, after Žižka left the Táborite Union, his new East Bohemian grouping soon came into conflict with the Prague Hussites, who were supported by the Lithuanian-born prince Sigismund Korybut.

After Žižka seized control of Hradec Králové, despite being completely blind, he also took control of Dvůr Králové nad Labem, Jaroměř and Čáslav, towns associated with the Prague Union. He then defeated Prague Union forces at the Battle of Strauchův dvůr. In response, moderate Utraquists and the Prague Hussites formed an alliance with Catholics, known as the St. Gall's Coalition. The coalition fought several battles against Žižka's forces and ultimately suffered a severe defeat at the Battle of Malešov on 7 June 1424.

After this victory, Žižka's army moved into northeastern Bohemia. According to the *Chronicle of an Old Prague Collegiate*, Žižka burned numerous villages and small towns and had monks burned at the monastery in Turnov. However, he probably intended to avoid attacking larger fortified settlements and instead gather forces for a campaign against Prague.

In the first half of September, Žižka approached the capital with Hussite contingents from Žatec, Louny, Klatovy and other towns. His army encamped in the area of Libeň, while Prince Korybut was in Prague. The Prague Hussites had little interest in an open conflict with Žižka. Reports also describe opposition within the besieging army to an attack on the capital of the kingdom, defended by fellow Hussites and former comrades-in-arms.

== Conclusion of the peace ==
The Peace of Špitál Field is one of the few surviving records of the final phase of Žižka's military and political activity on the domestic front. Several sources report that on Wednesday, 14 September 1424, the feast of the Holy Cross, a delegation representing the Prague Hussites and Sigismund Korybut left Prague. It was led by the priest Jan Rokycana.

The delegation met Žižka and his followers on Špitálské pole, an area outside the eastern gates of the New Town of Prague, in the vicinity of what later became Karlín. Rokycana apparently acted as an ecclesiastical mediator and helped negotiate a reconciliation between the two rival Hussite factions. The sources do not mention a written treaty, suggesting that the agreement may have been concluded orally.

On this occasion, Žižka reportedly referred to the recent peace agreement at Konopiště Castle, saying: “This peace will last as long as the agreement concluded at Konopiště.” To commemorate the agreement, the two sides piled up a mound of stones near the Church of St Ambrose in the New Town, on the site of what later became Republic Square.

The *Chronicle of an Old Prague Collegiate* states that the reconciliation was made on the basis of 14,000 *kopa* of small groschen and that a large pile of stones was assembled on Špitálské pole to commemorate it.

Enea Silvio Piccolomini is the only source to report that, just before fighting was about to begin, the priest Jan Rokycana left Prague with the consent of the townspeople and went to Žižka's camp, where he persuaded him to make peace with the city. Piccolomini is also the source for the reported opposition to an attack on Prague within Žižka's army.

== Consequences ==
The meeting was followed by further agreements concluded at Zdice, which partially resolved the disputes. The Prague and Žižka factions subsequently campaigned together against Catholic forces in Moravia.

However, after Žižka's death on 11 October 1424 near Přibyslav, the agreements made at Zdice were soon broken. A period of renewed fighting between the Hussite factions followed, particularly between the Prague Hussites and the Orebite grouping, which became known as the Orphans. The Táborites often joined the Orphans. In 1425, another Hussite union, based around Žatec and Louny, emerged under the leadership of Jakoubek of Vřesovice.

Disputes between the various factions continued until the end of the Hussite Wars and were among the factors contributing to the decisive Battle of Lipany in 1434.

== Commemoration ==
Historians of the Hussite period in the 19th century increasingly regarded the peace at Špitálské pole as one of the major diplomatic events of the Hussite era. The meeting subsequently became the subject of paintings and illustrations by several Czech artists.

Two murals in Karlín commemorate the event, as the district occupies part of the area once known as Špitálské pole. One is visible on the façade of the eastern wing of the primary and nursery school on Lyčkovo Square and dates from 1904 to 1906. The other, by Cyril Chramosta, is inside the Karlín Synagogue. It was created in 1953, when the building was converted into a prayer hall for the Czechoslovak Hussite Church.
