= Siege of Jihlava =

Siege of Jihlava (1423)
- Part of the Hussite Wars
| Date | Mid-September 1423 |
| Location | Jihlava, Moravia |
| Result | Peace treaty between Hussites and Catholic Jihlava |

Belligerents
| Orebites (Hussite Union led by Jan Žižka) | Forces loyal to Sigismund of Luxembourg and Albert II of Habsburg |

Commanders and leaders
| Jan Žižka; Jan Hvězda of Vícemilice | Unknown |

The Siege of Jihlava lasted several days in mid-September 1423, during the Hussite Wars. The town's garrison, loyal to the Holy Roman Emperor and King of Bohemia Sigismund of Luxembourg and the Margrave of Moravia Albert II of Habsburg, successfully defended Jihlava against the army of the East Bohemian Hussite Union, commanded by the blind military leader Jan Žižka and the union's senior commander Jan Hvězda of Vícemilice. The operation was part of the Hussite campaign into Moravia and included a counterttack by the defenders against the besieging army.

== Background ==
In the spring of 1423, Jan Žižka broke with the Táborite Union and began building a new Hussite organisation in eastern Bohemia, sometimes referred to as the Lesser Tábor. The original East Bohemian Hussites, known as the Orebites and led by the priest Ambrož of Hradec Králové, gradually came under his authority. After being established in Německý Brod on 8 March 1423, the union initially relied mainly on former members of the Táborite field army and on Orebite and Táborite nobles.

The growing power of the blind commander alarmed the Bohemian nobility. On 20 April 1423, Žižka defeated their army at the Battle of Hořice. He subsequently defeated his former ally Diviš Bořek of Miletínek at the Battle of Strauchův dvůr, the first battle between opposing Hussite armies, and captured Hradec Králové. By the end of the summer, he had reached an agreement with the Prague Union and began preparing a campaign into Moravia. Because of Žižka's advanced blindness, one of his closest commanders was the military leader Jan Hvězda of Vícemilice.

== Course of the siege ==
The expedition is mentioned in several later texts known as the Old Czech Annals (Staré letopisy české). Žižka's army probably set out from eastern Bohemia in early September, shortly after occupying Čáslav and Kutná Hora. The campaign was apparently directed primarily against Catholic towns in the Bohemian-Moravian Highlands and the estates of the moderate Utraquist nobleman Menhart II of Hradec in southeastern Bohemia.

At the time, Jihlava was a strategically important fortified town on one of the principal routes between Bohemia and Moravia. It remained loyal to King Sigismund and Margrave Albert. Hussitism had relatively little support in the town, which had a large German-speaking population. Jihlava had also received Catholic refugees expelled from towns controlled by the Hussites, including Čáslav and Kutná Hora.

Žižka's army arrived near Jihlava around the middle of September and took up positions outside its fortifications. During the short siege, the defenders launched an attack against the besiegers. Brief contemporary accounts report that the Hussites repelled the attack and that Žižka pursued the defenders as far as the town ditch.

Some sources state that the defenders inflicted significant losses on Žižka's forces and negotiations followed, resulting in an agreement that neither side would attack the other and that the Hussite army would withdraw from the town. According to accounts of the campaign, between 19 and 21 September Žižka's army proceeded to besiege Telč.

== Aftermath ==
The failure to capture well-fortified Jihlava apparently did not significantly disrupt Žižka's campaign in Moravia and may not have been its principal strategic objective. The siege of Telč was probably commanded independently by Jan Hvězda, while Žižka is said to have moved with part of the army towards Pelhřimov.

Hvězda raided several villages and attacked a number of castles on Menhart's estates before being defeated by Menhart on 17 November in the Battle of Horní Dubenky, near Janštejn Castle. Hvězda then withdrew to rejoin Žižka's forces.

There are few surviving records of Žižka and his brotherhood's activities during the final quarter of 1423. One surviving document is a letter sent by the people of Hradec Králové at the end of November, warning him about a potential assassin.

The Old Czech Annals later describe a campaign by Žižka into Hungary, in the territory of present-day Slovakia. However, leading historians of the Hussite period date the composition of this account to after 1525. They generally consider the episode either legendary or a confused account of a campaign by the Orphans in 1431.
