= Battle of Mladá Vožice =

1420 battle of the Hussite Wars

- Part of the Hussite Wars
- Image from the battle of Mladá Vožice, Tkaldeček in the middle (novel Jan Žižkal, 1925)
Date	5 April 1420
Location	Mladá Vožice, Bohemia
Result	Hussite victory

Belligerents
Taborites	Royalist forces

Commanders and leaders
Jan Žižka	Mikeš Divůček of Jemniště

Strength
3 000 – 4 000 men (according to Žižka's digital museum)	2 000 – 3 000 men (according to Žižka's digital museum); 1,000–2,000 (according to contemporary and later accounts)

Casualties and losses
Unknown	Heavy; many captured or killed

The Battle of Mladá Vožice was fought on 5 April 1420 during the Hussite Wars, near the town of Mladá Vožice in southern Bohemia. A Hussite force led by the military commander Jan Žižka launched a surprise attack on royalist troops commanded by the Kutná Hora mintmaster Mikeš Divůček of Jemniště. The attackers captured or killed many of the defenders and seized a large number of horses and weapons.

The victory helped remove an immediate military threat to the emerging Hussite community at Tábor. The captured horses and equipment also contributed to the development of the Hussites' military forces.

== Prelude ==
In early 1420, royalist forces and supporters of the Pilsen regional alliance besieged Pilsen, where a group of Hussites had taken refuge after refusing to accept the truce concluded between the Utraquists and Catholics in Prague on 18 November 1419. After approximately three months of fighting, the Hussites' position became increasingly difficult. They eventually accepted an arrangement negotiated by representatives of Prague that was intended to guarantee them safe passage out of the city.

Around 23 March 1420, approximately 400 Hussites, including women and children, left Pilsen and headed towards the newly established Hussite settlement at Tábor. The royalist side failed to honour the agreement. Two days later, the departing group was attacked near Sudoměř by a force consisting of the Knights Hospitaller from Strakonice and Catholic nobles, including the troops associated with Mikeš Divůček of Jemniště and Peter of Sternberg.

The royalist force was defeated at Sudoměř, where the difficult terrain prevented it from fully exploiting its numerical and equipment advantages. However, the royalists captured approximately 30 Hussites, who were taken to Kutná Hora. The surviving Hussites subsequently reached Tábor, probably around 29 March. Shortly after their arrival, the community appointed four military commanders, including Jan Žižka, who appears to have assumed the leading military role.

Following the Hussite victory at Sudoměř, royalist troops began gathering at Mladá Vožice, approximately 20 kilometres from Tábor. The castle there was held by Catholic supporters of King Sigismund of Luxembourg and served as a forward base for royalist operations. Žižka therefore organised an attack on the settlement below the castle to neutralise the immediate threat to Tábor.

== Battle ==
The Hussite attack took place during the night of 4–5 April 1420, Good Friday. According to the historical accounts, the Taborite forces moved against Mladá Vožice and launched their assault around dawn. The settlement was surrounded by a wooden enclosure, which the attackers breached before setting fire to the town.

The Hussites caught many of the royalist soldiers by surprise. Numerous defenders were killed or captured, while others managed to escape to the castle. The attackers seized substantial booty, particularly horses, as well as weapons and armour. They did not attempt to capture the castle itself, instead returning to Tábor with their prisoners and spoils.

The battle is described in several historical sources. One of the principal accounts comes from the Hussite chronicler Lawrence of Březová, who recorded the capture of royalist mercenaries, the destruction of the settlement and the seizure of horses. According to his account, the prisoners taken at Mladá Vožice were subsequently exchanged for Hussites captured at Sudoměř and held in Kutná Hora.

A similar account appears in the Old Czech Annals (Staré letopisy české), which associates the attack with Žižka and describes the capture of horses, weapons and armour. The annals also connect the spoils with the formation of a Hussite cavalry force.

The Italian humanist Aeneas Silvius Piccolomini, writing later in the fifteenth century, also described Žižka's attack on a royalist force stationed at Vožice. His account gives a figure of approximately 1,000 mounted men under the royalist commander. Other accounts give different figures, and the exact strength of the opposing forces remains uncertain.

== Aftermath ==
The victory at Mladá Vožice reduced the immediate threat posed to the emerging Hussite community at Tábor and strengthened the position of the Taborites in southern Bohemia. The captured horses and military equipment were particularly valuable because they enabled Žižka to equip additional fighters and develop a cavalry force.

Nevertheless, the royalist threat to Tábor did not disappear, and the Hussites continued to face opposition from neighbouring Catholic nobles and ecclesiastical authorities. On 7 April, two days after the battle, Hussite forces attacked a fortress at Sedlec, approximately eight kilometres from Tábor, captured it and killed its owner, Oldřich of Ústí.
