= Siege of Prachatice (1420) =

- Part of the Hussite Wars
- Hussites attack Prachatice
Date	25 April and 12 November 1420
Location	Prachatice, Bohemia
Result	Hussite victory; capture of the town

Belligerents
Taborites	Catholic defenders of Prachatice

Commanders and leaders
Jan Žižka (probably, in April); Jan Žižka (November)	Unknown

Casualties and losses
Unknown	More than 200 inhabitants killed after the second capture, according to contemporary accounts

The Capture of Prachatice by the Hussites refers to two military operations during the Hussite Wars in 1420. The town of Prachatice, an important centre on the Golden Trail, was captured by Hussite forces in April and again in November. Following the second capture, many Catholic male inhabitants were killed or burned to death.

== Prachatice before the Hussite Wars ==
From the mid-14th century, Prachatice developed as an important trading town on a branch of the Golden Trail, along which salt was transported from Passau into Bohemia. The town's privileges were confirmed by John of Luxembourg. By the beginning of the Hussite Wars, Prachatice was fortified and had a predominantly German-speaking population.

== The two captures ==
=== First siege ===
On 25 April 1420, Hussite forces, probably commanded by Jan Žižka, approached Prachatice after capturing Vodňany. The town surrendered. Catholic burghers fled, and the Hussites partially demolished the fortifications before withdrawing.

After the Hussite army left, Catholic inhabitants returned and persecuted local supporters of communion under both kinds. Two or three were reportedly burned to death.

=== Second siege ===
On 12 November 1420, Žižka returned to Prachatice. The defenders rejected his offer of surrender under guarantees that their lives and property would be spared. The Taborites stormed the town and captured it. According to the contemporary chronicler Lawrence of Březová, approximately 135 people were killed in the streets and another 85 were burned in the sacristy of the Church of St James.

Women and children were expelled from the town, while Utraquist inhabitants returned. Žižka ordered improvements to the town's defences and appointed Chval Řepický of Machovice and Jeník of Mečkov as captains. Prachatice became part of a chain of Hussite towns in southwestern Bohemia, alongside Vodňany, Klatovy, Sušice and Písek.

== After the Hussite Wars ==
In 1436, after the acceptance of the Compacts of Basel, Prachatice recognised Sigismund of Luxembourg as king. It briefly became a royal town, and Sigismund confirmed its former privileges, particularly those relating to the salt trade.

== Account by Lawrence of Březová ==
The contemporary chronicler Lawrence of Březová described both the persecution of Utraquists after the first siege and the violence following the second capture. His account is the principal narrative source for the events.

Historians have assessed the account differently. František Palacký and Josef Pekař accepted it, while Petr Čornej has questioned whether the reported dialogue between Žižka and the defenders was recorded accurately, since the chronicler was not an eyewitness. Čornej nevertheless considers the general course of events plausible within the practices of medieval warfare. Estimates of the dead vary among historical accounts.
