= Battle of Nekmíř =

1419 battle of the Hussite Wars

Coordinates: 49°51′29″N 13°15′48″E

- Part of the Hussite Wars
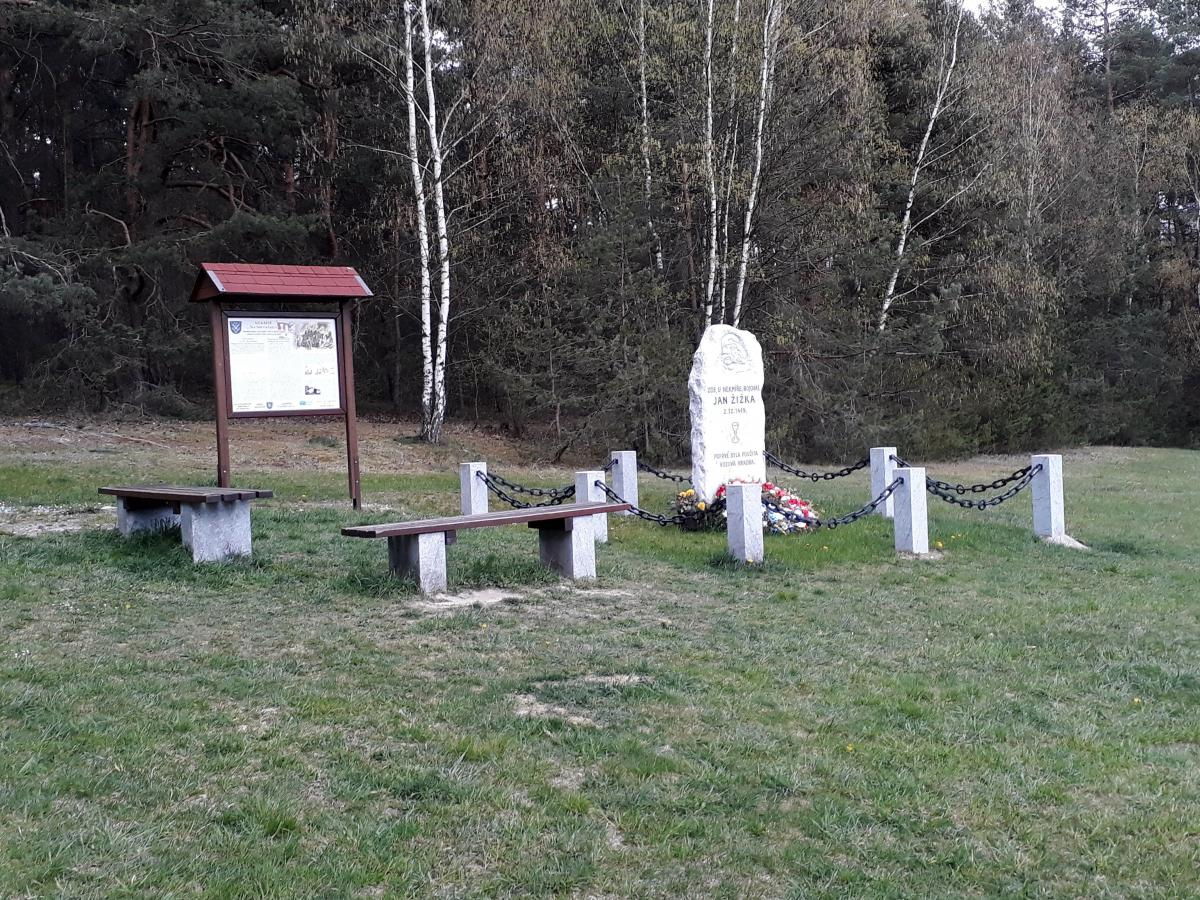
- Memorial in Nekmíř to the battle
Date	December 1419
Location	Nekmíř, north of Pilsen
Result	Hussite victory

Belligerents
Hussites	Landfrieden of Pilsen

Commanders and leaders
Jan Žižka	Bohuslav of Schwanberg

Strength
400 infantry 7 war wagons	2,000 cavalry and infantry

Casualties and losses
Unknown	Heavy

The Battle of Nekmíř was one of several raids carried out by the Bohemian Royalist forces, commanded by Bohuslav of Schwanberg, against Jan Žižka's Hussite troops.

The raid caught some Hussite forces besieging the fortress of Nekmíř.

The Hussite force was able to break through Bohuslav's lines by using artillery (hand guns) mounted on wagons, and effect a retreat. This skirmish was the first documented use of the wagon fort during the Hussite Wars.

The results of this conflict were important in demonstrating Jan Žižka's military competence in the minds of the Hussites. The Prague Hussites would later call for Žižka's assistance in defending their town against the crusading Imperial Army, despite having spurned him by acquiescing to the Royalists' demands after the initial Royalist-Hussite conflict in Prague.
