= Szalonna (village) =

- Location of Szalonna
- Coordinates: 48.45093°N 20.74045°E
- Country: Hungary
- County: Borsod-Abaúj-Zemplén

Area
  - Total: 20.08 km^{2} (7.75 sq mi)

Population (2004)
  - Total: 1,057
  - Density: 52.63/km^{2} (136.3/sq mi)
- Time zone: UTC+1 (CET)
  - Summer (DST): UTC+2 (CEST)
- Postal code: 3754
- Area code: 48

Szalonna is a village in Borsod-Abaúj-Zemplén county, Hungary.

In the village the church is an example of Romanesque architecture. It consists of two parts. The older is the rotunda on the east side of the recent building, which is younger, but of Árpád age - the village Romanesque church with murals. The rotunda has several relatives of this type in the Carpathian Basin: Herencsény, Bagod-Szentpál, Hidegség. A group of such extended rotunda old churches have a specific characteristic: the six folded inner structure of Karcsa, Gerény and Kiszombor.

In Szalonna there was a small Jewish community and a Jewish cemetery still exists there.

== Etymology ==
The name probably comes from Slavic Slověna (Slověn: Slav, maybe a personal name, see also Slověnice). Slověna > Solona > Salona. 1249 Zolouna, Zolovna.

== Bibliography ==
- Gerevich T.: Magyarország románkori emlékei. (Die romanische Denkmäler Ungarns.) Egyetemi nyomda. Budapest, 1938. 843 p. --- 32–33. p., LXXXVI. tábla bal alsó kép.
- Gervers-Molnár V.: A középkori Magyarország rotundái. (Romanesque Round Churches of Medieval Hungary.) (Mûvészettörténeti Füzetek, 4.) Akadémiai Kiadó. Budapest, 1972.
- Gerő, L. (1984): Magyar műemléki ABC. (Hungarian Architectural Heritage ABC.) Budapest
- Henszlmann, I. (1876): Magyarország ó-keresztyén, román és átmeneti stylü mű-emlékeinek rövid ismertetése, (Old-Christian, Romanesque and Transitional Style Architecture in Hungary). Királyi Magyar Egyetemi Nyomda, Budapest

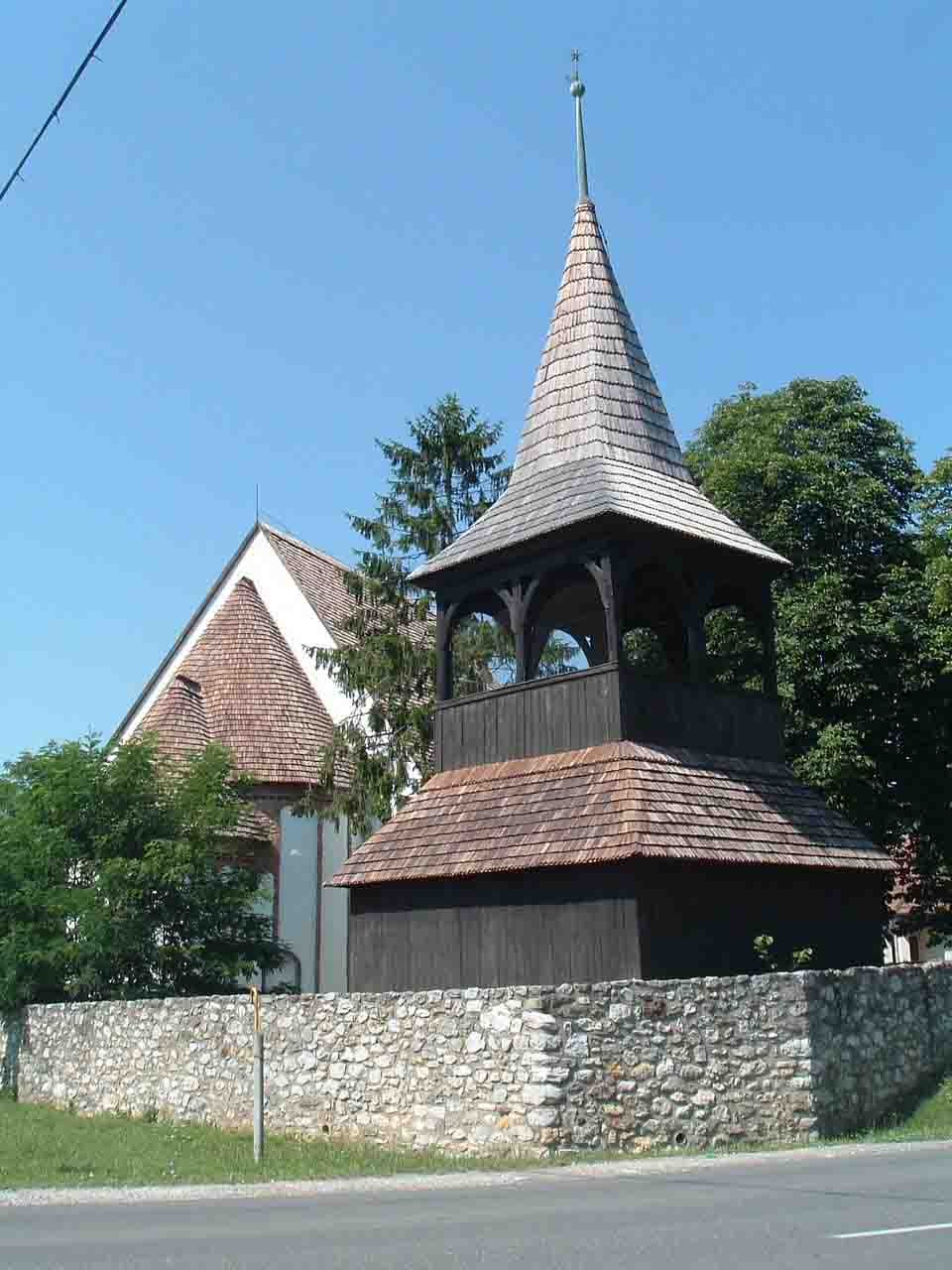
The Reformed church
