= Battle of Německý Brod =

Battle in the Hussite Wars

Coordinates: 49°44′23″N 15°28′52″E

- Part of the Second anti-Hussite crusade, Hussite Wars
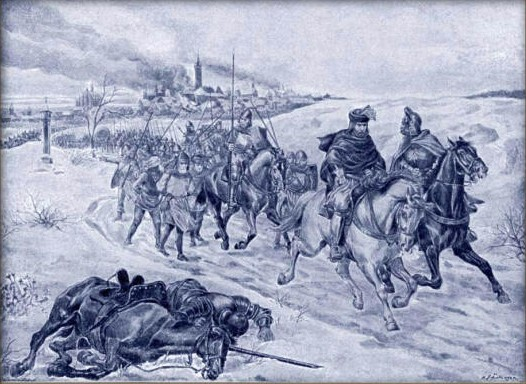
Date	10 January 1422
Location	Německý Brod, Bohemia
Result	Hussite victory

Belligerents
Hussite coalition: Praguers; Taborites; Orebites; Bohemian Hussite nobility	Crusade: Kingdom of Hungary; Holy Roman Empire; Duchy of Austria; Margraviate of Moravia; Bohemian Catholic nobility; Silesia; Německý Brod (garrison, civilians)

Commanders and leaders
Jan Žižka	Filippo Scolari

Strength
Unknown	Unknown

Casualties and losses
Unknown	At least 548

The Battle of Německý Brod (also Battle of Deutschbrod) took place on 10 January 1422, at Německý Brod in Bohemia, during the Hussite Wars. Led by Jan Žižka, the Hussites besieged the army of Royalist crusaders. The Roman Catholic crusaders were no match for the Hussites and Německý Brod was quickly taken and sacked. More than 500 mercenaries (548 according to the chronicles) drowned as they fled across the frozen Sázava River. During Žižka's dealings with the crusaders, part of his troops invaded Německý Brod, burned down almost the entire town and killed about 1,000–2,000 inhabitants, which was the majority of the population at the time.
