= Defeat of Adamites =

Defeat of the Adamites
- Part of the Hussite Wars
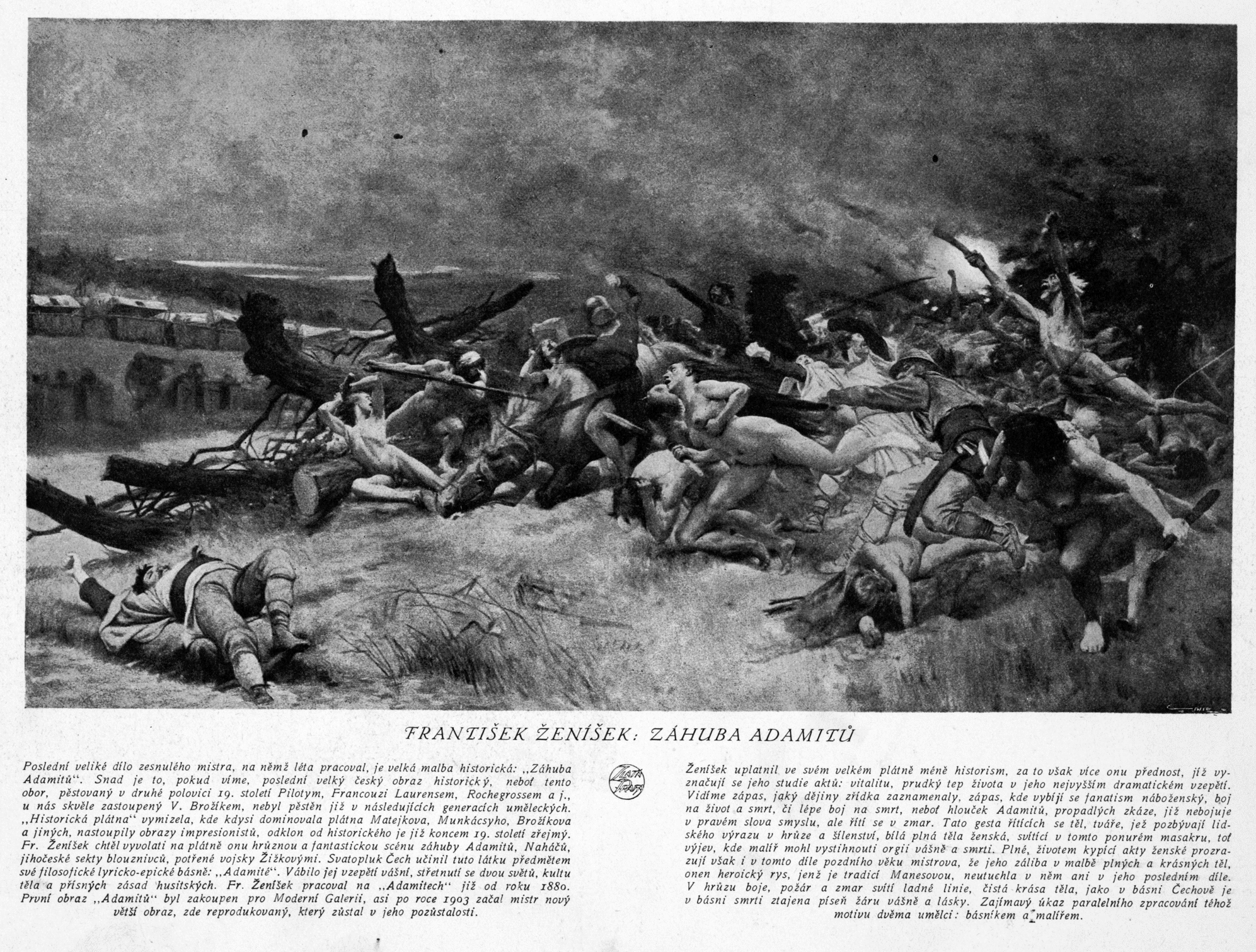
- Downfall of Adamits by František Ženíšek
Date	October 1421
Location	Ostrov na Hamru, near Veselí nad Lužnicí, Bohemia
Result	Hussite victory

Belligerents
Hussites	Adamites

Commanders and leaders
Jan Žižka	Adam Rohan

Strength
Unknown	Unknown

Casualties and losses
Unknown	Up to 40 captured, most of whom were executed

The defeat of the Adamites on Ostrov na Hamru was an engagement between Hussite forces and the radical religious group known as the Adamites, which took place in October 1421.

The Adamites were a radical offshoot of the Picards within the Hussite community of Tábor. In January 1421, a group of Picards led by Martin Húska left Tábor for Příběnice. Under the leadership of the priest Petr Kániš, the group became increasingly radicalised, adopting chiliastic beliefs and reportedly engaging in sexual orgies. At the turn of March and April 1421, the Taborite community dispersed them and drove them out of Příběnice. The group subsequently established a makeshift camp in the wooded hills on the right bank of the Lužnice River.

Jan Žižka attacked them in April 1421. Many fled, but approximately fifty were captured, including Petr Kániš. They were taken to the village of Klokoty and burned at the stake.

Žižka intervened against the remaining Adamites again during a campaign against Soběslav. In 1421, Hussite forces under his command moved against the survivors, who had gathered on an island in the Nežárka River between Veselí nad Lužnicí and Stráž nad Nežárkou. From there, the Adamites launched raids into the surrounding countryside, burning, among other places, Kardašova Řečice.

The final engagement with the Hussites took place in October 1421. Although the Adamites put up a determined defence, they were defeated. Forty of them were captured and killed by the sword or fire on 21 October 1421.

Žižka reportedly had the captured Adamites burned, sparing only one man so that he could testify to the Taborite priests about the group's practices. Žižka subsequently sent the so-called Adamite Articles to Prague to inform the city's priests about their beliefs and alleged activities.

In October 2021, an event commemorating the 600th anniversary of the defeat of the Adamites was held in the municipality of Val, at Ostrov na Hamru. A memorial to the fallen Adamites was unveiled on the occasion.
