= Čeněk of Wartenberg =

Czech nobleman (d. 1425)

Čeněk z Vartemberka
- Born: c. 1379
- Died: 17 September 1425 Veliš Castle, Crown of Bohemia
- Allegiance: Utraquist (1419–20, 1421, 1425); Royalist (1421–24)
- Rank: Highest Burgrave of Bohemia
- Conflicts: Vyšehrad – Vítkov Hill – Hořice

Čeněk of Wartenberg (Czech: Čeněk z Vartemberka; German: Vinzenz von Wartenberg; c. 1379 – 17 September 1425) was a commander of the Royalist Bohemian forces at the start of the Hussite Wars. Up until the first half of 1420 he was a commander of the Utraquist League, a moderate fraction of the Hussite movement. As a result of severe atrocities committed by Taborites, members of the more radical part of this movement, he returned to the royalist/Catholic side.
