= Battle of Skalice =

- Part of the Hussite Wars
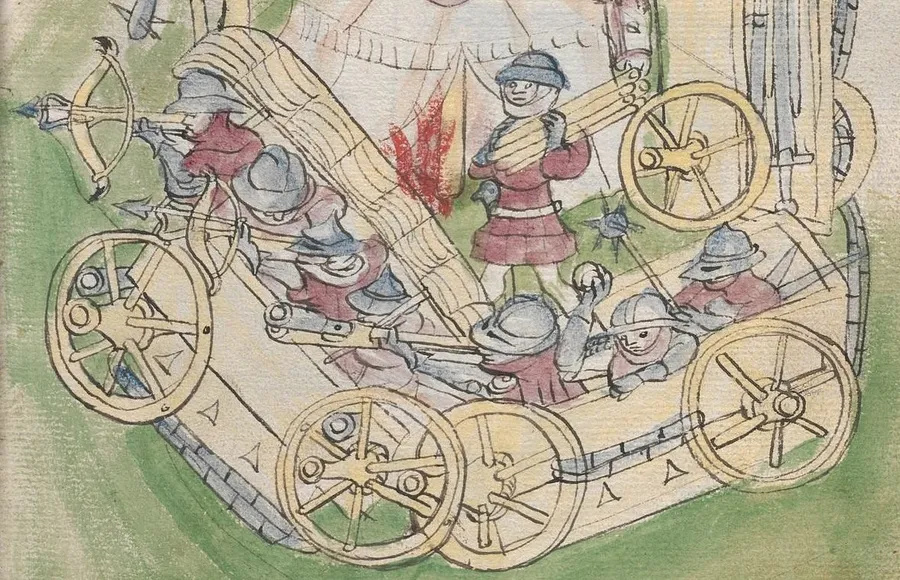
- Hussite Wagon fort
Date	6 January 1424
Location	Near Česká Skalice, Kingdom of Bohemia
Result	Orebite victory

Belligerents
Orebites	Eastern Bohemian Catholic nobility

Commanders and leaders
Jan Žižka; Jan Hvězda of Vícemilice	Půta III of Častolovice; Jan Městecký of Opočno; Hynek Červenohorský of Dubá; Arnošt of Černčice

Strength
2,500-3,000 men, including war wagons	5,000 men

Casualties and losses
Unknown	Unknown; some captured

The Battle of Skalice, also known as the Battle of Česká Skalice, was fought on 6 January 1424 between the forces of the Eastern Bohemian Hussite Union, commanded by the blind military leader Jan Žižka, and an army of Eastern Bohemian Catholic nobles led by Půta III of Častolovice and Jan Městecký of Opočno. The battle took place during the Hussite Wars, between the Second and Third Crusades against the Hussites.

The exact location of the engagement is unknown, but it probably took place near the fortress of Velká Skalice, between the present-day town of Česká Skalice and the village of Zlíč in eastern Bohemia. The battle ended in a Hussite victory. It was one of the last field battles fought by Žižka before his death ten months later.

== Background ==
In July 1423, the Taborite commander Jan Žižka captured Hradec Králové, which belonged to the urban union led by Prague. He took advantage of the absence of the Prague army, which was then campaigning in Moravia. After the army's hurried return from the margraviate, the forces of the two Hussite factions engaged in the Battle of Strauchův dvůr on 4 August, where Žižka's troops emerged victorious.

The blind commander subsequently began organising a new military union in eastern Bohemia. It was based on four towns—Hradec Králové, Jaroměř, Dvůr Králové nad Labem and Čáslav—as well as a permanent field army.

In mid-October of the same year, representatives of the Bohemian capital summoned members of the moderate Utraquist and Catholic nobility to Prague for the so-called Saint Gall's Assembly. Although the resolution adopted at the meeting did not name anyone explicitly, it was evidently directed primarily against Žižka.

Žižka continued to fight his internal enemies and decided to lead a military campaign in northeastern Bohemia. His principal targets were Catholic nobles known as the Opočno faction. According to a letter from Ambrož of Hradec Králové, they were preparing an assassination attempt against Žižka.

== Course of the battle ==
Very few contemporary chronicle accounts of the battle have survived. The engagement is mentioned only briefly in the Old Czech Annals, and historians have therefore had to reconstruct its course and location from limited evidence.

Žižka's army, estimated to have numbered several thousand men and equipped, among other things, with war wagons, advanced from Hradec Králové through Jaroměř. It probably followed the relatively accessible terrain along the Elbe, before continuing upstream along the Úpa. Opposing it was a coalition of Catholic nobles led by Půta of Častolovice, Jan Městecký of Opočno, Hynek Červenohorský of Dubá and Arnošt of Černčice. Their forces advanced from the north through the Úpa valley and probably intended to attack Žižka while he was on the march.

Žižka withdrew to a hill near the fortress of Velká Skalice, which belonged to the Utraquist nobleman Viktorín Boček of Kunštát, as did the nearby settlement of Skalice. The fortress and settlement could have served as a supporting base for the Hussites. The Catholic lords' attack was unsuccessful. Žižka's army apparently launched a counterattack and forced the Catholic forces to run.

An alternative theory places Žižka's camp shortly before 6 January on a hill in the area where the centre of present-day Česká Skalice was later established. The hill subsequently became known as Žižka's Hill. According to this interpretation, Žižka moved north from there and encountered the Catholic army in the area of Dubno Forest.

The blind Žižka probably directed the battle with the assistance of Jan Hvězda of Vícemilice, who had become one of his closest companions towards the end of his military career. The Catholics were defeated and withdrew to territory under their control, farther away from Hradec Králové.

No precise figures for the number of combatants or fatalities have survived. Nevertheless, the Catholic side probably suffered greater losses during the engagement. The Old Czech Annals mention that some members of the noble army were captured.

== Aftermath ==
The Hussite victory was followed by several months of raids, looting and the burning of settlements in eastern Bohemia.

On 5 March, Žižka attempted to subdue the town of Hostinné, but his assault on the town's walls failed, and he abandoned further operations against it.

Several days later, Žižka captured the fortress of Mlázovice, where he killed Jan Černín. According to the historical account, Černín had personally killed Matěj Lupák at the Battle of Týnec, a close associate of the priest Ambrož of Hradec Králové. Žižka subsequently advanced against Smidary, captured the settlement and burned it.

He then moved into the regions around Jičín and Nový Bydžov. At the beginning of May, he organised a major expedition into the Pilsen Region.

Žižka fought his last battle in May 1424 at the Battle of Malešov, near Kutná Hora, where his army again emerged victorious.

In September, he marched with his army towards Prague, where a reconciliation between the Hussite factions was achieved. Immediately afterwards, he set out on a campaign in Moravia accompanied by his closest associate, Jan Hvězda of Vícemilice. On 11 October 1424, Žižka died during the siege of Přibyslav.
