= Battle of Nebovidy =

Battle in the Hussite Wars

Coordinates: 49°59′23″N 15°13′29″E

- Part of the Second anti-Hussite crusade, Hussite Wars
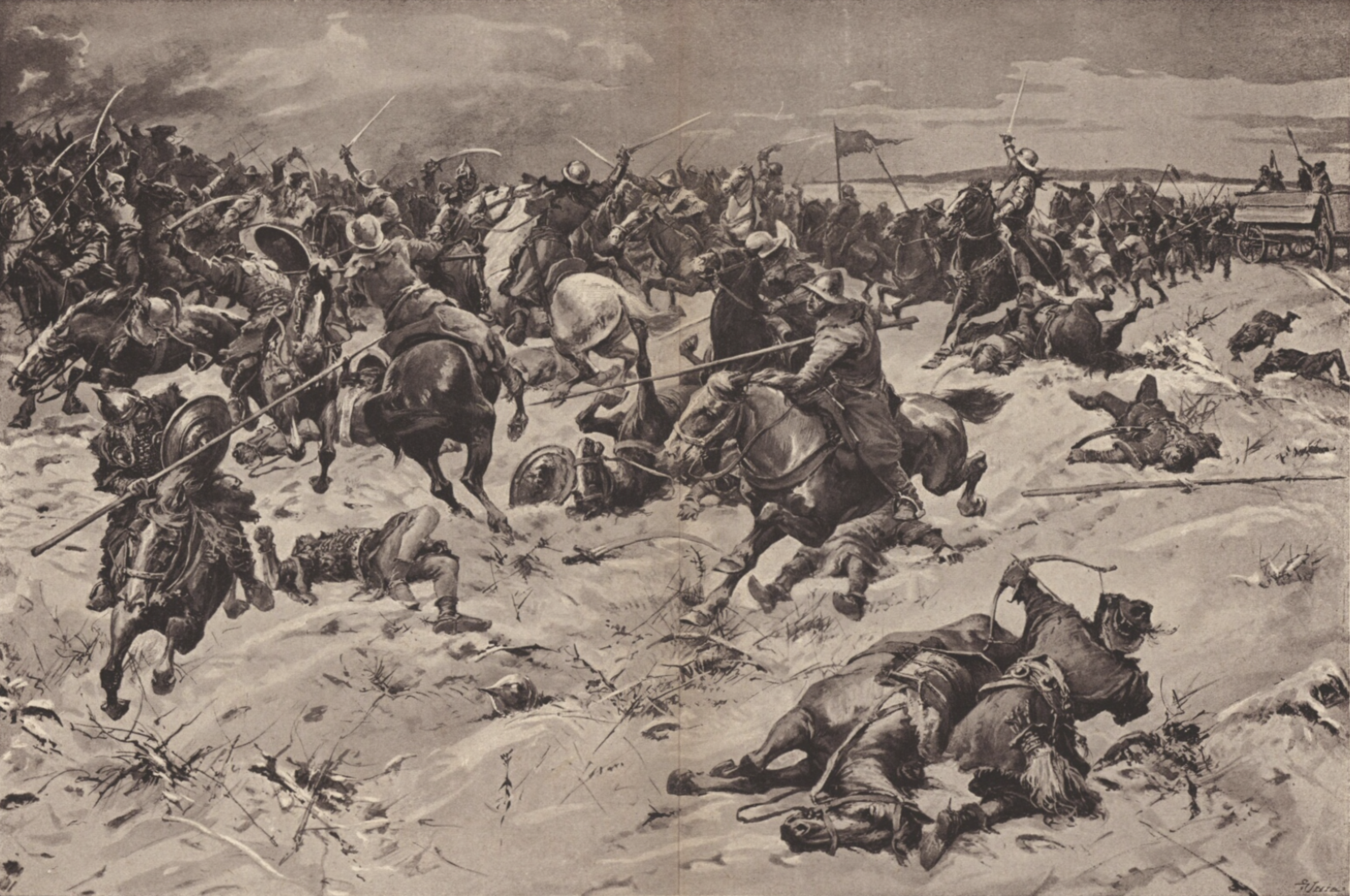
- Illustration of the Battle of Nebovid from F. J. Čečerka's historical novel Jan Žižka of Trocnov (Věnceslav Černý, 1925)
Date	6 January 1422
Location	Nebovidy, Bohemia
Result	Hussite victory

Belligerents
Crusade along with Catholic loyalists: Kingdom of Hungary; Holy Roman Empire; Kingdom of Germany; Duchy of Austria; Silesian duchies; Margraviate of Moravia; Bohemian Catholic nobility	Hussite coalition: Praguers; Taborites; Orebites; Bohemian Hussite nobility

Commanders and leaders
King Sigismund; Pippo Spano	Jan Žižka

Strength
50,000–92,000: 80,000 Hungarians; 12,000 Austrians	12,000–18,000

Casualties and losses
Unknown, more than Hussites	Unknown, less than Catholics

The Battle of Nebovidy was fought on 6 January 1422 between the Holy Roman Empire and the Hussites, during the second crusade against the Hussites. The Hussites were led by Jan Žižka, while the Imperial forces were led by King Sigismund. The Hussite army surprised a several thousand strong Hungarian force, part of the Sigismund-led army, resting near the village of Nebovidy (in central Bohemia, near Kolin). The Hungarians had no time to mobilize and regroup and the Hussites were victorious. This was the final battle of a larger conflict – the battle of Kutna Hora.
