= The Hussites =

- Husiti
- Directed by: Pavel Koutský
- Screenplay by: Pavel Koutský; Martin Čáp; Martin Jaroš
- Story by: Martin Čáp; Martin Jaroš
- Produced by: Tomáš Rychecký
- Starring: Viktor Preiss; Jiří Lábus; Oldřich Kaiser; Otakar Brousek ml. Jan Přeučil; Václav Postránecký; Martha Issová; Bára Hrzánová; Valérie Zawadská; Jan Schmid
- Narrated by: Marek Eben
- Cinematography: Milan Rychecký
- Distributed by: CinemArt
- Release date: 7 November 2013 (Czech Republic)
- Running time: 85 minutes
- Country: Czech Republic
- Language: Czech
- Budget: 20 million CZK
- Box office: 1,597,591 CZK

The Hussites is a 2013 Czech animated historical comedy film directed by Pavel Koutský. It follows two fictional characters, Záboj and Mlhoš, who are hired by Čeněk of Vartenberk and become involved in events surrounding Jan Hus and the Hussite movement, influencing the course of historical events.

The characters are voiced by Jiří Lábus, Oldřich Kaiser, Viktor Preiss, Martha Issová, Jan Přeučil and Marek Eben.

A mobile game based on the film was also released. The film was seen by 20,618 viewers in Czech cinemas in 2013.

In 2014, Hussites was selected as one of ten films competing at the Anifilm festival.

== Plot ==
Set in 1415, the film follows two unlikely companions, the peasant Záboj and the impoverished nobleman Mlhoš, who become involved in the political and religious conflicts surrounding Jan Hus and the Hussite movement. After meeting in Prague, they are hired by Čeněk of Vartenberk to become Hus's media advisers and accompany him to the Council of Constance, where he is arrested. The pair subsequently rescue Hus from execution and return to Bohemia. Bohemians read about Hus' execution and chase the duo through the town before throwing several nobles of a window.

Záboj a nd Mlhoš receive an elixir of combativeness. Under its influence Záboj assumes the identity of the one-eyed military commander Jan Žižka, while helping the Hussites defeat their enemies using unconventional tactics and inventions. Mlhoš on the other hand invents hussite flag. They both become involved in several famous battles, including those at Sudoměř and Vítkov. Eventually Záboj becomes tired of being Žižka and thus they announce Žižka's demise. Prokop the Great becomes the new hussite leader. Záboj and Mlhoš receive letter from Hus and together with Anna set out to find thim while being pursued by Čeněk and Mlhoš's domineering wife Fuchsie. Their journey ends in a fantastical encounter in which Hus establishes a settlement later known as Houston, before the Hussites eventually travel to the Moon.

== Cast ==
- Jiří Lábus as peasant Záboj
- Oldřich Kaiser as knight Mlhoš
- Viktor Preiss as Jan Hus
- Martha Issová as Anna
- Jan Přeučil as Sigismund, Holy Roman Emperor
- Otakar Brousek ml. as Wenceslaus IV of Bohemia
- Václav Postránecký as Čeněk of Vartemberk
- Bára Hrzánová as Fuchsie, Mlhoš' wife
- Valérie Zawadská as Sophia of Bavaria
- Jan Schmid as inventor Leonardo

== Production ==
The film's working title was Hus i ti Husiti (Hus and those Hussites). Its production took seven years and its budget exceeded CZK 20 million.

== Reception ==
The film received mixed-to-negative reviews from Czech critics.

František Fuka rated the film 3 out of 10. He criticised its animation, technical execution, sound design and screenplay, while noting that some of its more absurd jokes were inventive.

Mirka Spáčilová of iDNES.cz rated the film 4 out of 10.
