= Jan Žižka =

Czech military commander (1360–1424)

- Jan Žižka z Trocnova a Kalicha
- Portrait of Jan Žižka by Adolf Liebscher
- Born: c. 1360; Trocnov, Bohemia
- Died: 11 October 1424 (aged 63–64); Žižkovo Pole near Přibyslav, Bohemia
- Burial place: Cathedral of the Holy Spirit
- Military career
- Allegiance: Taborites (1419–1423); Orebites (1423–1424)
- Service years: c. 1378–1424
- Rank: Chamberlain to Queen Sofia of Bavaria
- Nicknames: John the One-eyed; Žižka of the Chalice
- Conflicts: Polish–Lithuanian–Teutonic War: Battle of Grunwald; Hussite Wars: Battle of Nekmíř; Battle of Sudoměř; Battle of Vítkov Hill; Battle of Vyšehrad; Battle of Kutná Hora; Battle of Nebovidy; Battle of Německý Brod; Battle of Hořice; Battle of Malešov
- Awards: A castle near Litoměřice. He gave the biblical name of Chalice (Kalich in Czech) to this new possession

Jan Žižka z Trocnova a Kalicha (English: John Zizka of Trocnov and the Chalice; c. 1360 – 11 October 1424) was a Czech military leader and knight who was a contemporary and follower of Jan Hus, and a prominent Radical Hussite who led the Taborite faction during the Hussite Wars. Renowned for his exceptional military skill, Žižka is celebrated as a Czech national hero. Žižka led the Hussite forces in battles against three crusades and remained undefeated throughout his military career.

Žižka was born in the village of Trocnov, located in the Kingdom of Bohemia, into a family of lower Czech nobility. According to Piccolomini's Historia Bohemica, he maintained connections within the royal court during his youth and later held the office of Chamberlain to Queen Sofia of Bavaria. He fought in the Battle of Grunwald (15 July 1410), where he defended Radzyń against the Teutonic Order. Later, he played a prominent role in the civil wars in Bohemia. He led the Hussites during the first important clashes of the conflict in the Battle of Sudoměř (1420) and in the Battle of Vítkov Hill (1420). In the Battle of Kutná Hora (1421) he defeated the army of the Holy Roman Empire and the Hungarian Kingdom. The effectiveness of his field artillery against the royal cavalry in this battle made it a successful element of Hussite armies.

Žižka's tactics were unorthodox and innovative, and they are today considered examples of early modern guerrilla and asymmetric warfare. In addition to training and equipping his army according to their abilities, he used armored wagons, known as wagon forts, fitted with small cannons and hand cannons, anticipating the tank of five hundred years later. He exploited terrain to a greater extent than was conventional for his time, using terrain reconnaissance, knowledge, and manipulation to aid his guerilla tactics and defensive maneuvers at the time when cavalry charges and open field skirmishes were standard practice. His troops were reportedly highly disciplined and loyal, having been recruited from nobility, militias and peasantry alike. His tactics necessitated rapid training for new recruits to face highly trained and armored opponents repeatedly, who usually outnumbered his own troops. According to later writers, Žižka rarely committed his forces to battle unless he had first ensured a strong tactical advantage—often through ambushes, disruption of enemy movements, or use of fortified terrain—greatly increasing the odds of victory despite being outnumbered. For those reasons, Žižka is often regarded as one of the greatest military commanders of all time and his tactics are today studied in military academies worldwide.

A monument was erected on the Vítkov Hill in Prague to honor Jan Žižka and his victory on this hill in 1420. It is the third-largest bronze equestrian statue in the world.

== Early life ==
Jan Žižka was born in one of two Meierhofs of the village Trocnov (nowadays part of Borovany). An old legend says that he was born in the forest under an oak growing just next to the fields and little ponds belonging to the Meierhof. Žižka's family belonged to the lower Czech gentry (zemané) but did not own much estate. Little is known of the rest of the family. Jan Žižka had several siblings but the only names known to historians are brother Jaroslav and sister Anežka. The family had a crayfish in their coat of arms.

The date of Žižka's birth is not known. A document dated 3 April 1378 mentions Johannes dictus Zizka de Trocnov (Jan called Zizka of Trocnov) as a witness on a marriage contract. On the basis of this document, it is assumed that Žižka must have been of legal age at this time and was born around 1360. Nevertheless, there is no direct evidence whether Jan Žižka listed on this document was identical with the Hussite general. For example, Czech historian Tomek and his followers supposed it could have been the military leader's father. They argued that if Žižka were adult in 1378, he would be too old to become such an able commander after 1419. Others, such as Šmahel, admitted that even such an age might not have prevented him from successful leadership. Furthermore, historian Petr Čornej notes that "Žižka" was not a family name but a specific nickname that is not attested in any other member of Žižka's family.

In the years 1378–1384, Žižka's name appears on several property documents, which indicate that he was struggling with long-term financial problems. In 1381, Žižka is attested in Prague, in connection with the settlement of the inheritance on the Trocnov estate. It is unclear how to connect this stay with Piccolomini's later report that young Žížka received an education at the Prague royal court. A 1384 document also mentions some Kateřina, a wife of Johannes dictus Zizka. This document states that Žižka sold the field he had once acquired from Kateřina as a dowry. After this date, Žižka's name disappears from historical documents for 20 years and it is generally assumed that he became a mercenary soldier.

== Žižka as an outlaw ==
Although some of the south Bohemian nobility led by Henry III of Rosenberg took part in various revolts against king Wenceslaus IV of Bohemia at the turn of the 14th and 15th century (the king was even held captive in the Rosenberg castles of Příběnice and Český Krumlov for a short time), there is no evidence of Žižka's participation in these conflicts. It is supposed that in the early years of the 15th century Jan Žižka already controlled his family property. However, the family probably got into financial problems and started selling parts of their estate. Some sources suggest that Žižka's father took the place of the royal gamekeeper before he died in 1407 near Plzeň and Žižka himself might have been taken into the royal service, too, but the evidence is not clear enough.

However, beginning in 1406, Žižka starts appearing in the black book (acta negra maleficorum) of the Rosenberg estate as an accused bandit. Unfortunately the reasons of this charge are not known, but the fact that he declared open hostility to Henry of Rosenberg and also to the city of Budějovice and their allies suggests that he was trying to fight some injustice against his house and to enforce some of his rights in this way. Šmahel assigns the boom of south-Bohemian banditry in that time to the continual growth of the estates of the rich house of Rosenberg (and of the church estates) and simultaneous indebtedness and pauperization of the lower gentry together with the thirst for land among their subjects, which resulted in social tension in the area. These circumstances may have eventually forced Žižka to leave his residence in Trocnov. Historian Tomek also speculated that he might have been forcibly deprived of his small hereditary property, which was not uncommon in that time. As a result, he started leading the life of an outlaw, partly supported by the local nobleman Valkoun.

In any case, violence broke out and Žižka tried to harm his enemies on any possible occasion using as his allies, also local bandits, led by Matěj Vůdce (Matthew the Leader) who were seeking only financial profit. The group camped in various places, including a farm in the village of Sedlo (nowadays part of Číměř), a mill not far from Lomnice nad Lužnicí, at a house of an unknown woman in Hlavatce or simply in the woods. During that period, robbery, holding people for ransom, and attacking small towns were the main source of the group's income. They used it to pay their living expenses (including paying temporary hosts) and to pay spies. Žižka took part in these raids and at least one murder: a man belonging to the cohort of Henry of Rosenberg. Žižka and the bandits were also in touch with some more powerful enemies of Henry of Rosenberg. For example, in 1408 Žižka took part in preparations for conquering the castle Hus near Prachatice (whose burgrave was Mikuláš of Hus who later became one of first commandants in Žižka's army in the beginning of the Hussite Wars). He also negotiated with Aleš of Bítov to secure Jan's help attempting to conquer the towns of Nové Hrady and Třeboň. Another nobleman asking Jan's help was Erhart of Kunštát who wanted to capture the stronghold of Slověnice.

Some of Žižka's companions were eventually captured, tortured, and executed, including Matěj Vůdce. Žižka's situation changed on 25 of April 1409 when King Wenceslas agreed that his conflict with the city of Budějovice should be finished and on 27 June he pardoned him (calling him "faithful and beloved") by a special letter. At the same time he ordered the city council of Budějovice to do so too. This suggests that the king admitted that Žižka was at least partly justified in the conflict.

== Grunwald (1410) ==
According to the Polish chronicler Jan Długosz, in the following year (1410) Žižka served as a mercenary during the Polish–Lithuanian–Teutonic War. It is assumed that he was on the winning Polish-Lithuanian side of the Battle of Grunwald, also called the 1st Battle of Tannenberg, one of the largest battles in Medieval Europe. It was fought on 15 July 1410, and the alliance of the Kingdom of Poland and the Grand Duchy of Lithuania, led respectively by King of Poland Jogaila (Władysław II Jagiełło) and Grand Duke Vytautas (Witold), decisively defeated the Teutonic Knights, led by Grand Master Ulrich von Jungingen. Długosz reports that after the battle, Žižka was serving in the garrison of the town of Radzyń.

== A stay in Prague ==
The place of Žižka's activity in the years 1411–1419 is not entirely certain. According to a later report by Lukáš Pražský (from 1527), Žižka entered the service of Sophia of Bavaria, the wife of Wenceslas IV, as her chamberlain, and he accompanied her when she was attending the preachings of Jan Hus. Given that Hus went to the South Bohemian exile in 1413, this report must relate to the years 1411–1412. According to the Hussite historian Vavřinec z Březové (Vavřinec of Březová), who knew Žižka personally and referred to the events of 1419, the future Hussite leader then served as a familiaris regis Bohemiae (literally "a family member of the Bohemian king", i.e. a king's courtier). This is confirmed by later chronicles from the 16th century, which specifically highlight the exceptional position that Žižka had among the servants of Wenceslas IV. It is possible that Žižka took part in the unsuccessful war of the Polish king against the Teutonic Knights in 1414, but concrete evidence is lacking. However, it is interesting that just one month after the end of this war campaign, on 7 November 1414, a house in Na Příkopě street in Prague was bought by the one-eyed royal "doorman" Janek (Janek portulanus regius). Czech historiography generally accepts that this "doorman" was identical with Žižka. On 27 May 1416, the "doorman" Janek sells this house and buys another, smaller one in the Old Town.

== Rise to prominence ==
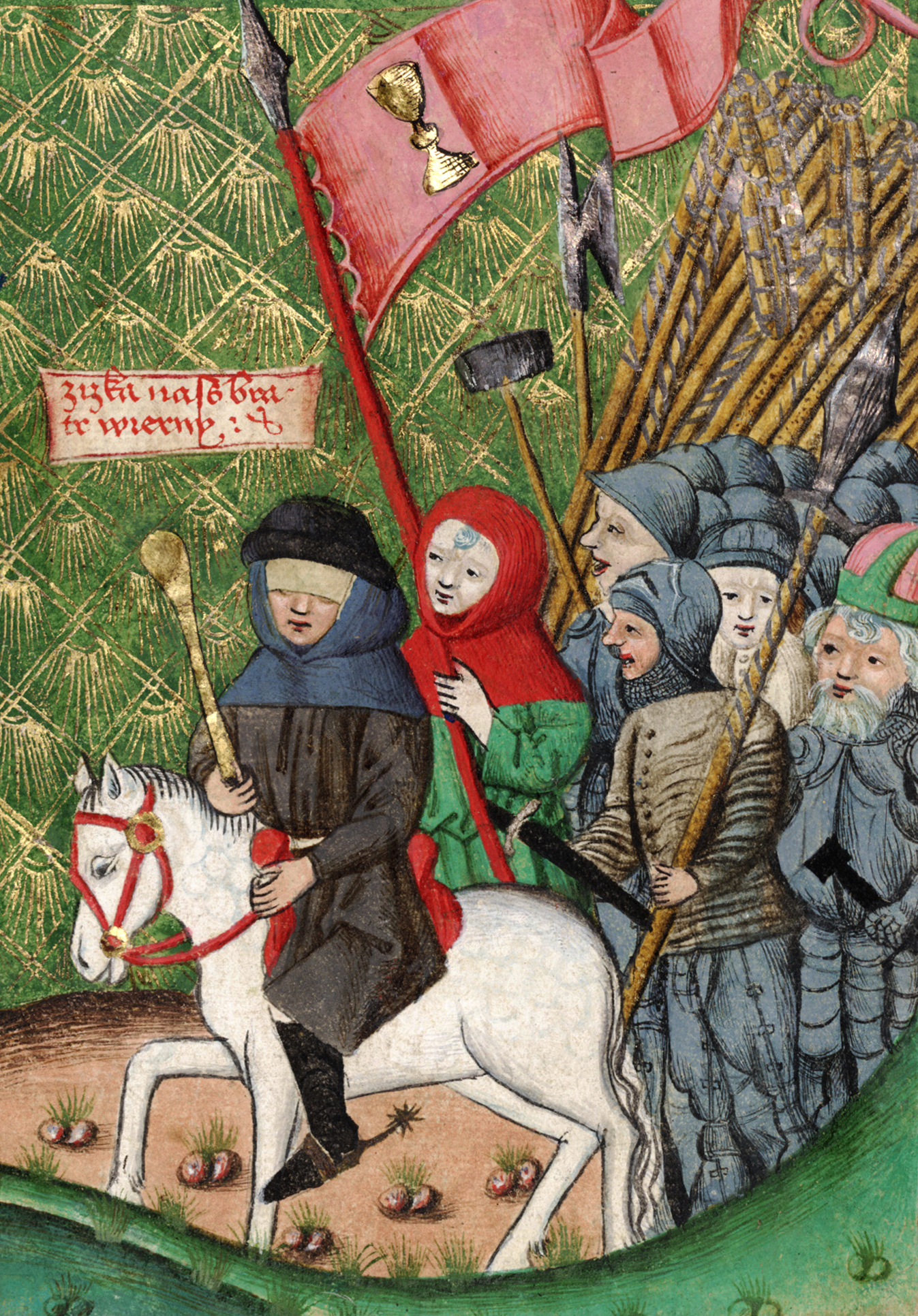
Jan Žižka leading his troops (illumination from the late 1400s)

Jan Žižka made his first significant mark in history on 30 July 1419 in Prague, when he joined a Hussite procession led by the priest Jan Želivský. The crowd gathered in front of the New Town hall and demanded the release of several Hussites held in prison. When these demands were rejected by the councilors, the crowd stormed the town hall and threw the councilors out of the windows. This so-called First Defenestration of Prague is regarded as the beginning of the Hussite revolution. Wenceslaus IV died 17 days after hearing about these events, likely from a heart attack. The Hussites subsequently seized the city and expelled all their opponents.

On 13 November 1419 a temporary armistice was concluded between the partisans of King Sigismund (the last Emperor of the House of Luxemburg) and the citizens of Prague. Žižka disapproved of this compromise and left Prague for Plzeň, one of the richest cities of the kingdom, with his followers, but soon left that city. On 25 March 1420 he defeated the partisans of Sigismund at Sudoměř, the first pitched battle of the Hussite wars. He later arrived at Tábor, the then-recently established stronghold of the Hussite movement. The ecclesiastical organization of Tabor had a somewhat puritanical character with a very strict military discipline being instituted though the government was established on a thoroughly democratic basis. Žižka took a large part in the organization of the new military community and became one of the four captains of the people (hejtman) who were at its head.

=== Wagenburg tactics ===
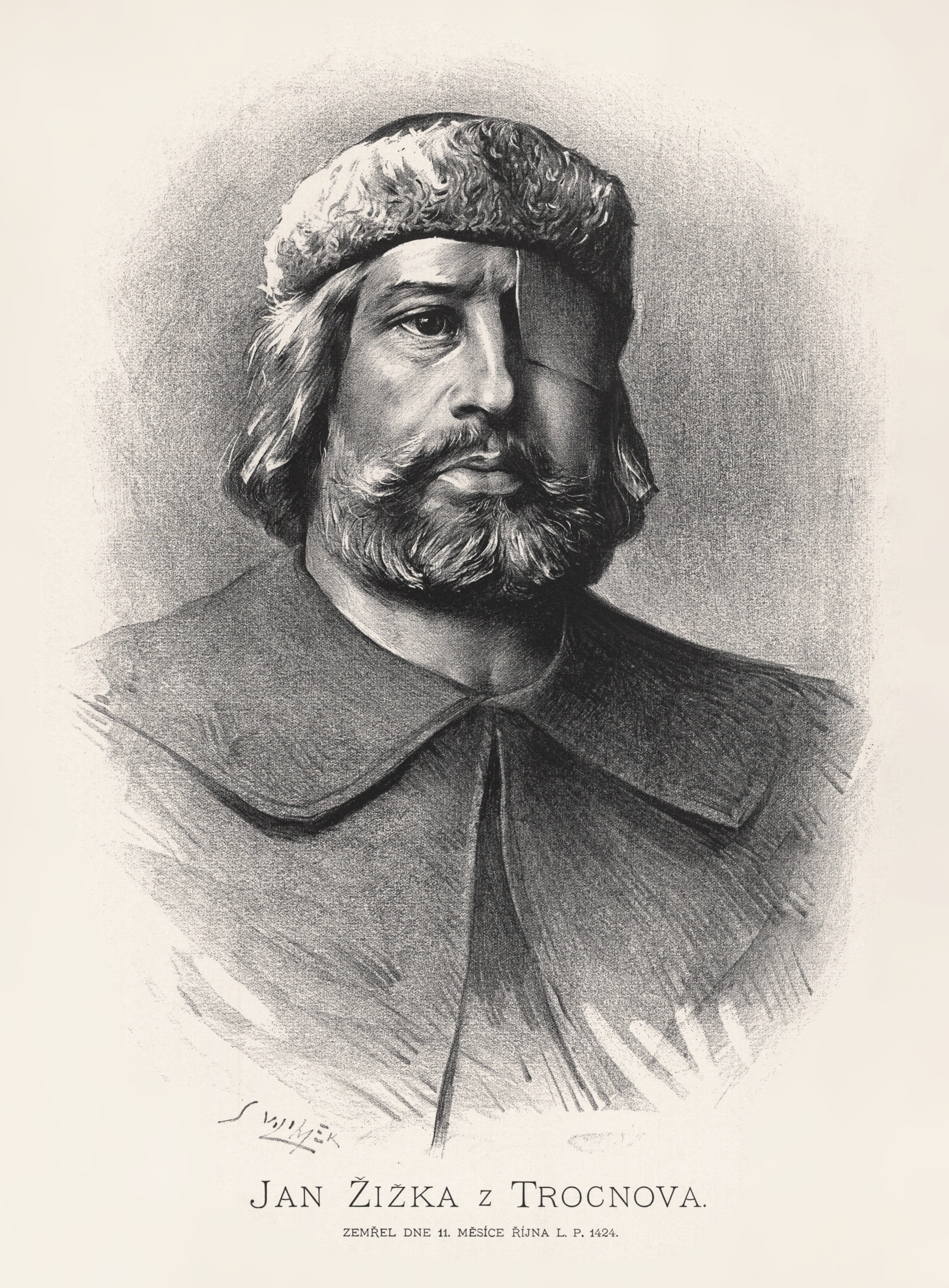
Jan Žižka z Trocnova, fictional portrait by Jan Vilímek

Žižka helped develop tactics of using wagon forts, called vozová hradba in Czech or Wagenburg by the Germans, as mobile fortifications. When the Hussite army faced a numerically superior opponent they prepared carts for the battle by forming them into squares or circles. The carts were joined wheel to wheel by chains and positioned aslant, with their corners attached to each other, so that horses could be harnessed to them quickly, if necessary. In front of this wall of carts a ditch was dug by camp followers. The crew of each cart consisted of 16–22 soldiers: 4–8 crossbowmen, 2 handgunners, 6–8 soldiers equipped with pikes or flails (the flail was the Hussite "national weapon"), 2 shield carriers and 2 drivers.

The Hussites' battle consisted of two stages, the first defensive, the second an offensive counterattack. In the first stage the army placed the carts near the enemy army and by means of artillery fire provoked the enemy into battle. The artillery would usually inflict heavy casualties at close range.

In order to avoid more losses, the enemy knights finally attacked. Then the infantry hidden behind the carts used firearms and crossbows to ward off the attack, weakening the enemy. The shooters aimed first at the horses, depriving the cavalry of its main advantage. Many of the knights died as their horses were shot and they fell.

As soon as the enemy's morale was lowered, the second stage, an offensive counterattack, began. The infantry and the cavalry burst out from behind the carts, striking violently at the enemy, mostly from the flanks. While fighting on the flanks and being shelled from the carts the enemy was not able to put up much resistance. They were forced to withdraw, leaving behind dismounted knights in heavy armor who were unable to escape the battlefield. The enemy armies suffered heavy losses and the Hussites soon had the reputation of not taking captives.

=== Gunpowder weapons ===
The Hussite wars also marked the earliest successful use of pistols on the battlefield and Žižka was an innovator in the use of gunpowder. He was the first European commander to maneuver on the field with cannon of medium caliber mounted on carts in between the wagons. The Czechs called the handgun a píšťala, and anti-infantry field guns houfnice, from which the English words "pistol" and "howitzer" have been derived. The Germans had just started corning gunpowder, making it suitable for use in smaller, tactical weapons. A handgunner on an open field armed with only a single-shot weapon and without a bayonette was no match for a charging knight on a horse; however, from behind a castle wall, or from within the enclosure of the wagenburg, massed and disciplined gunmen could use the handgun to its greatest potential. From his experiences at the Battle of Grunwald, Žižka knew exactly how his enemies would attack, and he found new ways to defeat forces numerically superior to his own.

== Hussite Crusades ==
The Hussite Wars were fought to win recognition of faith of the Hussites, the initial stages of the Protestant Reformation, and though predominantly a religious movement, it was also propelled by social issues and strengthened Czech national awareness. The Catholic Church deemed Hus's teachings heretical. He was excommunicated in 1411, condemned by the Council of Constance, and burned at the stake in 1415. The wars proper began in July 1419, with the First Defenestration of Prague, when protesting Hussites threw the town councillors and the judge out the windows of the New Town Hall. It has been reputed that King Wenceslaus IV was so stunned by the defenestration that he died from the shock shortly afterward on 16 August 1419. This led to the armed conflict in which Žižka was to earn his fame.

=== The first anti-Hussite crusade ===
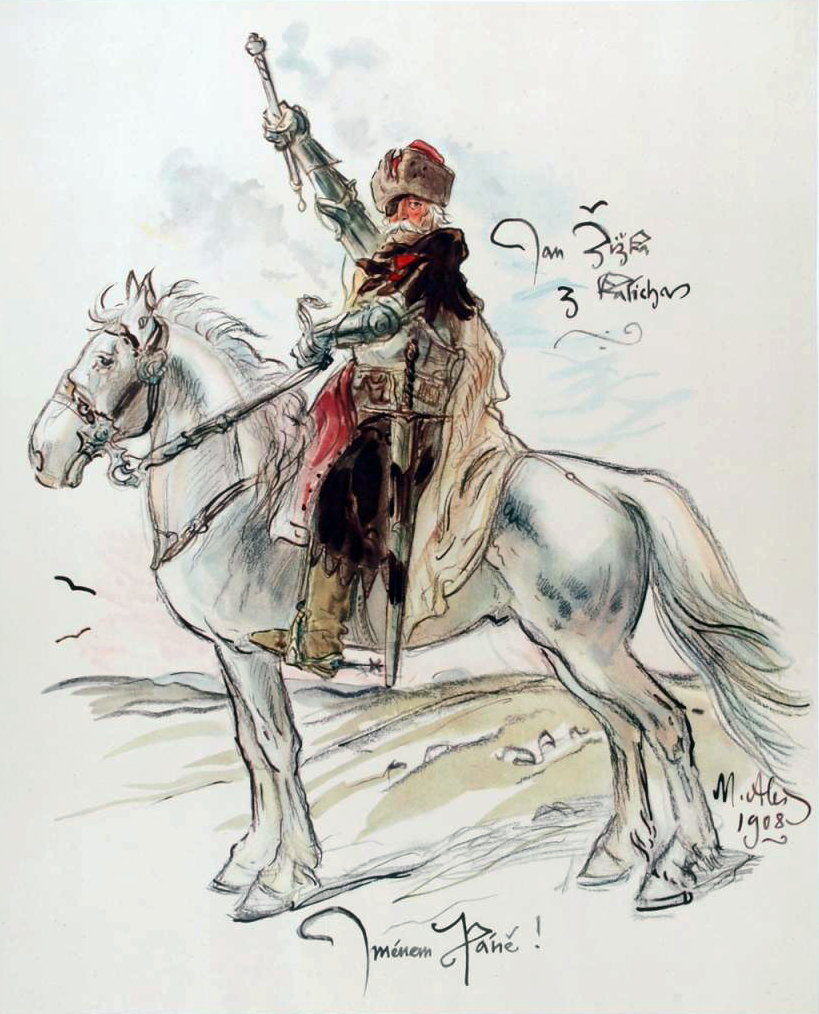
A painting by Mikoláš Aleš showing Jan Žižka as Hussite general

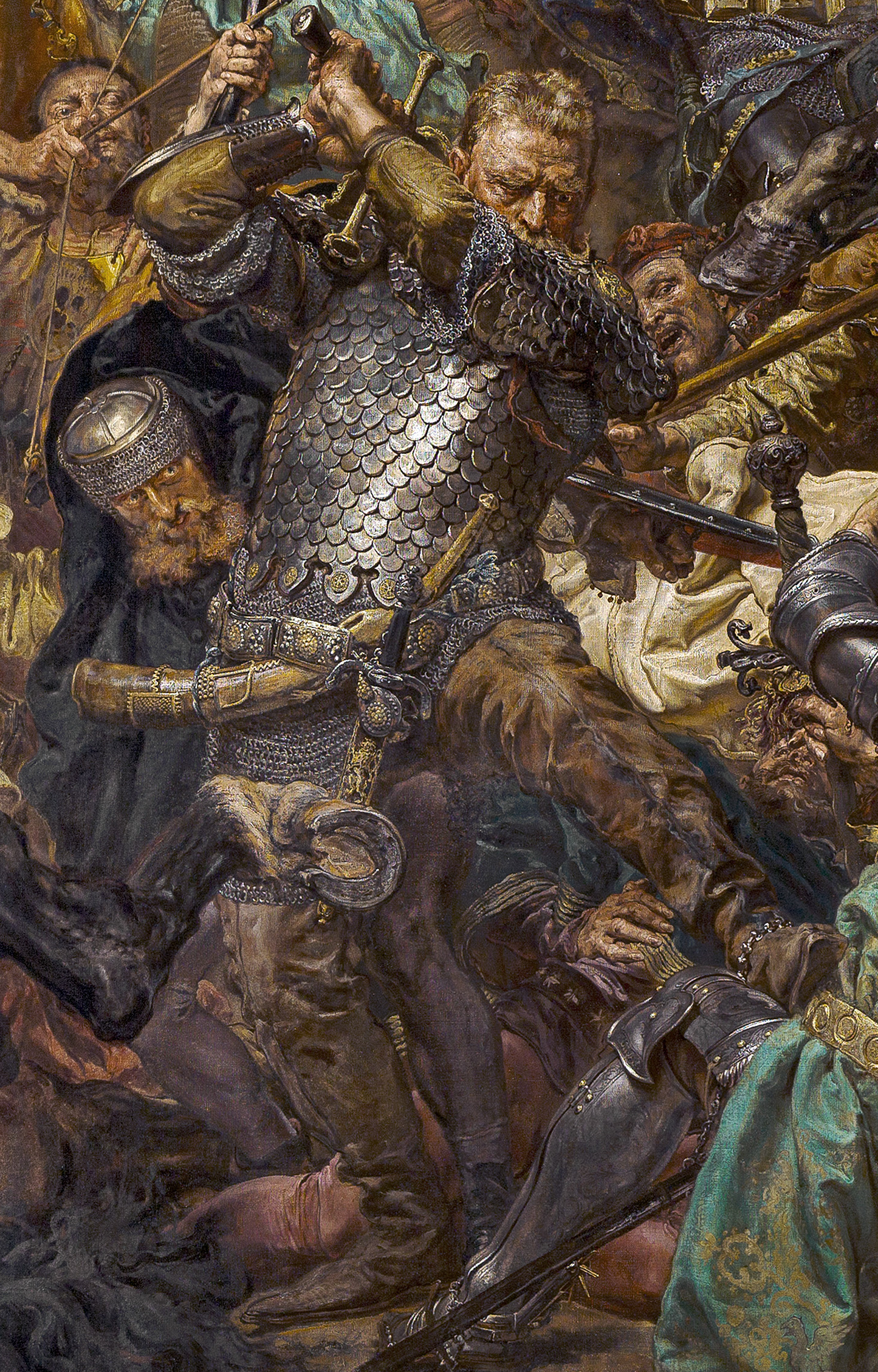
Jan Žižka in a detail of Jan Matejko's allegorical Battle of Grunwald

King Sigismund was king of Hungary but only the titular king of Bohemia. Sigismund had acquired a claim on the Bohemian crown, though it was then in question (and remained so until much later) whether Bohemia was a hereditary or an elective monarchy, especially as the line through which Sigismund claimed the throne had accepted that the Kingdom of Bohemia was an elective monarchy elected by the nobles, and thus the regent of the kingdom (Čeněk of Wartenberg) also explicitly stated that Sigismund had not been elected as reason for Sigismund's claim to not be accepted. A firm adherent of the Church of Rome, Sigismund was successful in obtaining aid from Pope Martin V, who issued a bull on 17 March 1420 which proclaimed a crusade "for the destruction of the John Wycliffe, Hussites and all other heretics in Bohemia". Sigismund and many German princes arrived before the walls of Prague on 30 June at the head of a vast army of crusaders from all parts of Europe, largely consisting of adventurers attracted by the possibility of pillage. They immediately began a siege of the city and Žižka was compelled to defend the Kingdom. He was a pragmatist in developing his military strategy. His army consisted of farmers and peasants, lacking both the funds and equipment to be classic soldiers with sword, horse and armor, so Žižka used their farmers' skills to boost their military efficiency. He adapted tools of agriculture into tools of war. The agricultural flail was transformed into the flail.

Menaced by Sigismund, the citizens of Prague entreated the Taborites for assistance. Led by Žižka and their other captains, the Taborites set out to take part in the defence of the capital. At Prague, Žižka and his men took up a strong position on the hill just outside the city known as the Vítkov, now in Žižkov, a district of Prague named after the battle in his honour. On 14 July the armies of Sigismund made a general attack. A strong German Crusader-led force assaulted the position on the Vítkov, the stronghold that secured the Hussite communications with the open country. Thanks to Žižka's personal leadership, the attack was thrown back and the forces of Sigismund abandoned the siege. On August 22 the Taborites left Prague and returned to Tábor. Though Sigismund had retired from Prague, the castles of Vyšehrad and Hradčany remained in possession of his troops. The citizens of Prague laid siege to the Vyšehrad (see Battle of Vyšehrad), and towards the end of October the garrison was on the point of capitulating through famine. Sigismund attempted to relieve the fortress, but was decisively defeated by the Hussites on November 1 near the village of Pankrác. The castles of Vyšehrad and Hradčany now capitulated, and shortly afterwards almost all Bohemia fell into the hands of the Hussites.

Žižka now engaged in constant warfare with the partisans of Sigismund, particularly with the powerful Romanist, Oldřich II of Rožmberk. Through this struggle, the Hussites obtained possession of the greater part of Bohemia from Sigismund. It was proposed to elect the Grand Duke of Lithuania Vytautas to the throne. However, the estates of Bohemia and Moravia met at Čáslav on 1 June 1421 and decided to appoint a provisional government, consisting of twenty members chosen from all the political and religious parties of the country. Žižka, who took part in the deliberations at Čáslav, was elected as one of the two representatives of Tábor.

Žižka summarily suppressed some disturbances on the part of a fanatical sect called the Adamites. He then continued his campaigns against the Romanists and the adherents of Sigismund, and having captured and rebuilt a small castle near Litoměřice (Leitmeritz), he retained possession of it, the only reward for his great services that he ever received or claimed. According to the Hussite custom he gave the Biblical name of Chalice (Kalich in Czech) to this new possession, and henceforth adopted the signature of Žižka of the Chalice. Jan Žižka did not capture any more properties for himself during the Hussite Wars. This fact was unusual for the time and distinguished Žižka from his contemporaries.

Later that year he was severely wounded while besieging the Rabí Castle, and lost the use of his remaining eye. Though now totally blind, he continued to command the armies of Tábor.

=== The second anti-Hussite crusade ===
At the end of 1421, Sigismund again attempted to subdue Bohemia and gained possession of the important town of Kutná Hora. The mainly German citizens of the city killed a few of the Hussites in the town and closed the city to Žižka, whose armies were camped outside the city walls. Sigismund's armies arrived and surrounded the Hussites. Žižka was at the head of the united armies of Tábor and Prague and though trapped managed to execute what some historians call the first mobile artillery manoeuver in history. Žižka broke through the enemy lines and retreated to Kolín, but having received reinforcements he attacked and defeated Sigismund's unsuspecting army at the village of Nebovidy between Kolín and Kutná Hora on 6 January 1422. Sigismund lost 12,000 men and only escaped himself by rapid flight. Sigismund's forces made a last stand at Battle of Německý Brod on 10 January, but the city was stormed by the Czechs, and contrary to Žižka's orders, its defenders were put to the sword.

== Civil war ==
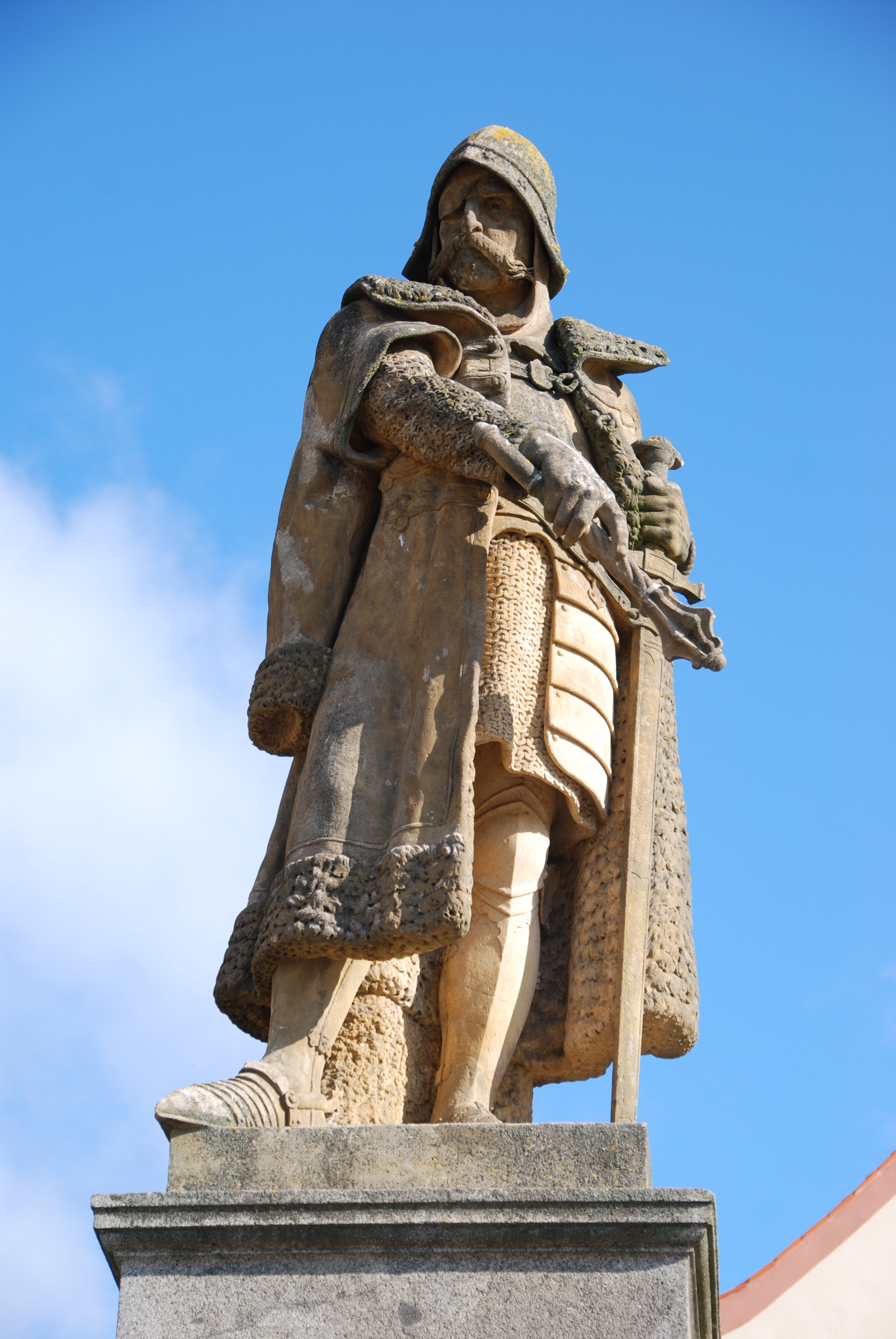
Statue of Žižka in Tábor's town square (Žižka Square), J. Strachovský, 1884

Early in 1423, internal dissent among the Hussites led to civil war. Žižka, as leader of the Taborites, defeated the men of Prague and the Utraquist nobles at Hořice on 20 April. Shortly afterwards came news that a new crusade against Bohemia was being prepared. This induced the Hussites to conclude an armistice at Konopiště on 24 June. As soon as the crusaders had dispersed, internal dissent broke out anew. During his temporary rule over Bohemia, Prince Sigismund Korybut of Lithuania had appointed Bořek, the lord of Miletínek, governor of the city of Hradec Králové. Bořek belonged to a moderate Hussite faction, the Utraquist party. After the departure of Sigismund Korybut, the city of Hradec Králové refused to recognize Bořek as its ruler, due to the democratic party gaining the upper hand. They called Žižka to its aid. He acceded to the demand and defeated the Utraquists under Bořek at the farm of Strachov (in the area of today's Kukleny within Hradec Králové) on 4 August 1423.

Žižka now attempted to invade Hungary, which was under the rule of his old enemy King Sigismund. Though this Hungarian campaign was unsuccessful owing to the great superiority of the Hungarians, it ranks among the greatest military exploits of Žižka, on account of the skill he displayed in retreat. In 1424, civil war having again broken out in Bohemia, Žižka decisively defeated the "Praguers" and Utraquist nobles at the battle of Skalice on 6 January, and at the battle of Malešov on 7 June. In September, he marched on Prague. On the 14th of that month, peace was concluded between the Hussite parties through the influence of John of Rokycany, afterwards Utraquist archbishop of Prague. It was agreed that the now reunited Hussites should attack Moravia, part of which was still held by Sigismund's partisans, and that Žižka should be the leader in this campaign.

However, Žižka died on the Moravian frontier near Přibyslav, during the siege of the castle in Přibyslav in what is today Žižkovo Pole, on 11 October 1424. Traditionally, it was said that he died of the plague; however, modern knowledge of historians excludes this theory. Even the theory of arsenic poisoning was ruled out after examining the skeletal remains. According to historians, the purulent disease carbuncle is considered the most likely cause of death.

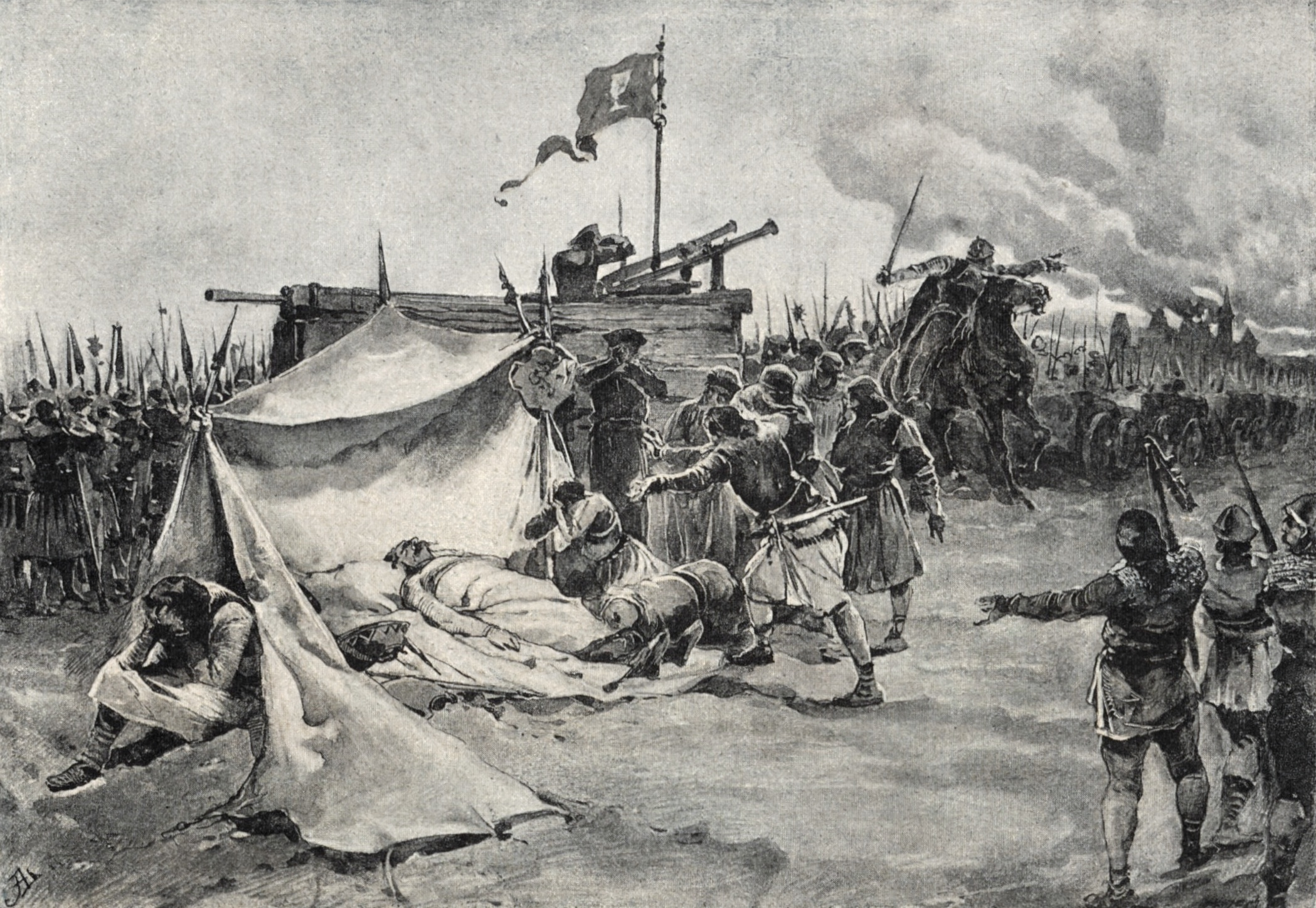
The death of Jan Žižka, illustration by Adolf Liebscher

According to chronicler Piccolomini, Žižka's dying wish was to have his skin used to make drums so that he might continue to lead his troops even after death. Žižka was so highly regarded that when he died, his soldiers called themselves Sirotci ("the Orphans") because they felt as if they had lost their father. His enemies said that "The one whom no mortal hand could destroy was extinguished by the finger of God."

He was interred in the church of Saints Peter & Paul in Caslau, but in 1623 his remains were removed and his grave destroyed by order of the Emperor Ferdinand II.

He was succeeded by Prokop the Great.

== Battle record ==
Key to outcome

Indicates a favorable outcome Indicates an unfavorable outcome Indicates an uncertain or mixed outcome

Summary (incomplete)
Date(s)	Clash(es)	Type(s)	Conflict(s)	Opponent(s)	Location(s)	Outcome(s)	Note(s)
15 July 1410	Battle of Grunwald	Open Battle	Polish–Lithuanian–Teutonic War	Teutonic Order	Western Masuria, Poland	Victory	
25 October 1415	Battle of Agincourt	Open Battle	Hundred Years' War	Kingdom of France	Azincourt, County of Saint-Pol	Victory	Žižka's participation in the battle is not confirmed but according to some sources, Žižka fought on the side of England.
30 July 1419	Defenestration of Prague	Storming of City Council	Hussite Wars	City of Prague	Prague, Bohemia	Victory	
December 1419	Battle of Nekmíř	Skirmish	Hussite Wars	Landfrieden of Pilsen	Nekmíř, north of Pilsen	Victory	First documented use of the wagon fort.
25 March 1420	Battle of Sudoměř	Open Battle	Hussite Wars	Landfrieden of Pilsen	Sudoměř, southern Bohemia	Victory	
5 April 1420	Battle of Mladá Vožice	Open Battle	Hussite Wars	Bohemian Nobility	Mladá Vožice, southern Bohemia	Victory	
April 1420	Siege of Prachatice	Siege	Hussite Wars	Town of Prachatice	Prachatice, southern Bohemia	Victory	
19–20 May 1420	Battle of Poříčí nad Sázavou	Open Battle	Hussite Wars	Bohemian nobility	Poříčí nad Sázavou, Central Bohemia	Victory	
14 July 1420	Battle of Vítkov Hill	Open Battle	Hussite Wars	Crusade	Prague, Bohemia	Victory	
29 August 1420	Conquest of Vodňany	Siege	Hussite Wars	Town of Vodňany	Vodňany, southern Bohemia	Victory	
September 1420	Siege of Lomnice nad Lužnicí	Siege	Hussite Wars	Town of Lomnice nad Lužicí	Lomnice nad Lužicí, southern Bohemia	Victory	
September 1420	Siege of Nová Bystřice	Siege	Hussite Wars	Town of Nová Bystřice	Nová Bystřice, southern Bohemia	Victory	
12 October 1420	Battle of Panský Bor	Open Battle	Hussite Wars	Holy Roman Empire	Malý Bor, western Bohemia	Victory	
November 1420	Siege of Prachatice	Siege	Hussite Wars	Town of Prachatice	Prachatice, southern Bohemia	Victory	
January 1421	Conquest of Kladruby Monastery	Storming of Monastery	Hussite Wars		Kladruby, western Bohemia	Victory	
February–March 1421	Siege of Pilsen	Siege	Hussite Wars	Landfrieden of Pilsen		Armistice	
16–18 March 1421	Conquest of Chomutov	Siege	Hussite Wars			Victory	
1 April 1421	Siege of Beroun	Siege	Hussite Wars			Victory	
May 1421	Siege of Litoměřice	Siege	Hussite Wars	Town of Litoměřice	Litoměřice	Withdrew	Žižka left the town after unsuccessful siege.
July 1421	Siege of Rabí Castle	Siege	Hussite Wars			Victory	Žižka lost eye during the siege.
October 1421	Defeat of Adamites	Skirmish	Hussite Wars	Bohemian Adamites	Hamr, southern Bohemia	Victory	
November 1421	Battle of Žlutice	Open Battle	Hussite Wars	Landfrieden of Pilsen		Victory	Hussites successfully defended the wagon fort for three days and finally broke through the encirclement.
21 December 1421	Battle of Kutná Hora	Open Battle	Hussite Wars	Crusade	Kutná Hora, central Bohemia	Victory	
6 January 1422	Battle of Nebovidy	Open Battle	Hussite Wars	Crusade	Kutná Hora, central Bohemia	Victory	
10 January 1422	Battle of Německý Brod	Open Battle	Hussite Wars	Crusade	Habry, Bohemia	Victory	
April 1422	Siege of Gutštejn	Siege	Hussite Wars			Victory	
27 April 1423	Battle of Hořice	Open Battle	Hussite Wars	Bohemian nobility		Victory	
4 August 1423	Battle of Strauchův Dvůr	Prague Hussites	Hussite Wars	Prague Citizens		Victory	
September 1423	Siege of Jihlava	Siege	Hussite Wars	Holy Roman Empire		Treaty	Successful defense of Jihlava led to a peace agreement with Hussites
17 May 1424	Battle of Kůzová	Skirmish	Hussite Wars	Landfrieden of Pilsen		Victory	No proper battle occurred.
7 June 1424	Battle of Malešov	Open Battle	Hussite Wars	Prague Hussites		Victory	
October 1424	Siege of Přibyslav	Siege	Hussite Wars			Victory	Žižka died during the siege but Přibyslav was captured by his units after his death.

== In popular culture ==
=== Literature ===
Jan Žižka appears in works by Alois Jirásek. Ancient Bohemian Legends has a story called "Jan Žižka" which follows Žižka's life. Žižka appears in 1891 novel Mezi proudy (Between the Currents) and 1893 novel Proti všem (Against All). He is also one of main characters in Jirásek's Hussite Trilogy which includes plays Jan Žižka (1903), Jan Hus (1911) and Jan Roháč (1914).

The legend about how Žižka ordered that his skin should be made into a war drum after his death is important in Gustav Meyrink's 1917 novel Walpurgisnacht.

Žižka appears as one of the main characters in the Armed Garden graphic novella (The Armed Garden and Other Stories) by David B. He is the hero of a novel by George Sand, of a German epic by Meissner, and of a Bohemian tragedy by Alois Jirásek.

Jan Žižka is one of the main characters in the 2013 manga series Dívčí Válka, also known as Otome Sensou (少女战争), both meaning Maidens' War, by Kouichi Ohnishi.

Jan Žižka: život a doba husitského válečníka (Jan Žižka: The Life and Era of the Hussite Warrior) is a book written by Czech historian Petr Čornej and published by Paseka publishing house in 2019 for the 600th anniversary of the beginning of the Hussite Revolution. It has approximately nine hundred pages divided into eight chapters and sixty-three subchapters, which follow the entire life of Jan Žižka from his youth until his death. The book won the 2020 Magnesia Litera award for Book of the Year and also triumphed in the nonfiction category.

=== Films ===
Jan Žižka was a main character in a 1919 film Utrpením ke slávě (Through Suffering to Glory). The film was an attempt to portray the suffering of the Czech people from mythical times to the Battle of White Mountain and World War I. The film is "concluded with an apotheosis of the resurrection of Hus' and Žižka's nation." The film wasn't fully completed and was probably shown only in some country cinemas during the summer of 1919. The film is considered lost. Žižka was portrayed by Richard F. Branald.

Jan Žižka is a central figure of the "Hussite Revolutionary Trilogy" directed by Otakar Vávra. The films starred Zdeněk Štěpánek as Žižka. It consists of Jan Hus, Jan Žižka and Against All.

Jan Žižka appeared in a 1960 Polish film Knights of the Teutonic Order. He is played by Tadeusz Schmidt.

In 1968 Czechoslovak Children film Na Žižkově válečném voze (On Žižka's Battle Waggon), Žižka was played by Ilja Prachař.

The 2013 animated film The Hussites is set during the Hussite wars. The protagonist of the film, Záboj serves as the film's version of Žižka.

Jan Žižka appeared in season 4 and 5 of a Polish television series The Crown of the Kings which ran from 2018 to 2024. He was portrayed by Jacek Łukowski.

A film Jan Žižka (English title Medieval) by director Petr Jákl was released in 2022. It follows Jan Žižka during his youth. It is the most expensive Czech film ever made. Žižka was portrayed by Ben Foster. It was released on Netflix in 2022.

=== Games ===
In the game Age of Empires II: Definitive Edition – Dawn of the Dukes, there is a single player campaign during which player takes role of Jan Žižka.

Age of Empires III features Hussite wagons as a unit used by Germans. Unit infobox directly mentions Žižka with the anglicized version of his name: John Zizka.

Žižka appears in Europa Universalis II as a default general for the Bohemia faction.

Field of Glory II: Medieval features Hussite campaign during which player takes role of Jan Žižka.

Jan Žižka is one of the legendary cavalry commanders in the mobile game Rise of Kingdoms.

Hrot includes a power-up called Calvaria of Čáslav which is a nod to the Calva of Caslav, the top part of a human skull found in Čáslav which is attributed to Jan Žižka.

Jan Žižka is an [Age I] leader in the expansion New Leaders and Wonders released in 2020 to the board game Through the Ages: A New Story of Civilization.

Žižka appears in a DLC for 1428: Shadows over Silesia called Tourney at the Bear Rock which is set in 1409.

Jan Žižka is a prominent character in Kingdom Come: Deliverance II, which is set in 1403. Here Žižka's likeness is modeled after Czech actor Stanislav Majer, with Adrian Bouchet performing the motion capture and voicing him in English and Martin Preiss in the Czech dub. Žižka's appearance in the game was praised with Josh Cotts of Game Rant calling Žižka the game's breakout star.

Jan Žižka can appear as a general in Europa Universalis V during the Hussite Wars event.

Jan Žižka is the main protagonist of the upcoming independent real-time strategy game Songs of the Chalice, which is set in early years of Hussite Wars.

Jan Žižka appears as a non-playable Rider-class Servant in the mobile game Fate/Grand Order (2015).

=== Other ===
Early in 1917, the 3rd Czechoslovak Rifle Regiment of the Czechoslovak legions in Russia was named after "Jan Žižka z Trocnova".

During World War II, a number of military units were named after Jan Žižka. One of them, the 1st Czechoslovak Partisan Brigade of Jan Žižka, was among the first anti-Nazi guerrilla units in occupied Czechoslovakia. A Yugoslav partisan brigade of the same name was formed in western Slavonia on 26 October 1943 and operated in areas inhabited by a large Czech and Slovak minority.

Žižkův vraždící palcát (Žižka's murdering mace) is a metal festival that has been held in Tábor since 1998.

== General and cited sources ==
- Bílek, Jiří (2007), Hádanky naší minulosti 7. Čtyři Janové a bratr Prokop, Euromedia Group Praha. pp. 172–173. ISBN 978-80-242-1952-3. Count Lützow, The Hussite Wars, J. M. Dent & Sons London, E. P. Dutton & Co. New York (1909).
- Čornej, Petr (2019), Jan Žižka. Nakladatelství Paseka. ISBN 978-80-7432-990-6
- Fudge, Thomas A., The Crusade Against Heretics in Bohemia, 1418–1437: Sources and Documents for the Hussite Crusades (Crusade Texts in Translation). Höfler, Konstantin, Geschichtsquellen Böhmens.
- Heymann, Frederick G. (1969), John Zizka & the Hussite Revolution, Russell & Russell New York (1955).
- Šmahel, František, Die Hussitische Revolution I–III, MGH-Schriften. 43/I–III, Hannover (2002).
  - Turnbull, Stephen, The Hussite Wars (1419–36), Osprey Publishing. ISBN 1-84176-665-8.
- Verney, Victor (2009), Warrior of God: Jan Žižka and the Hussite Revolution, Frontline Books London. ISBN 978-1-84832-516-6.
