= Žižkovo Pole =

- Municipality
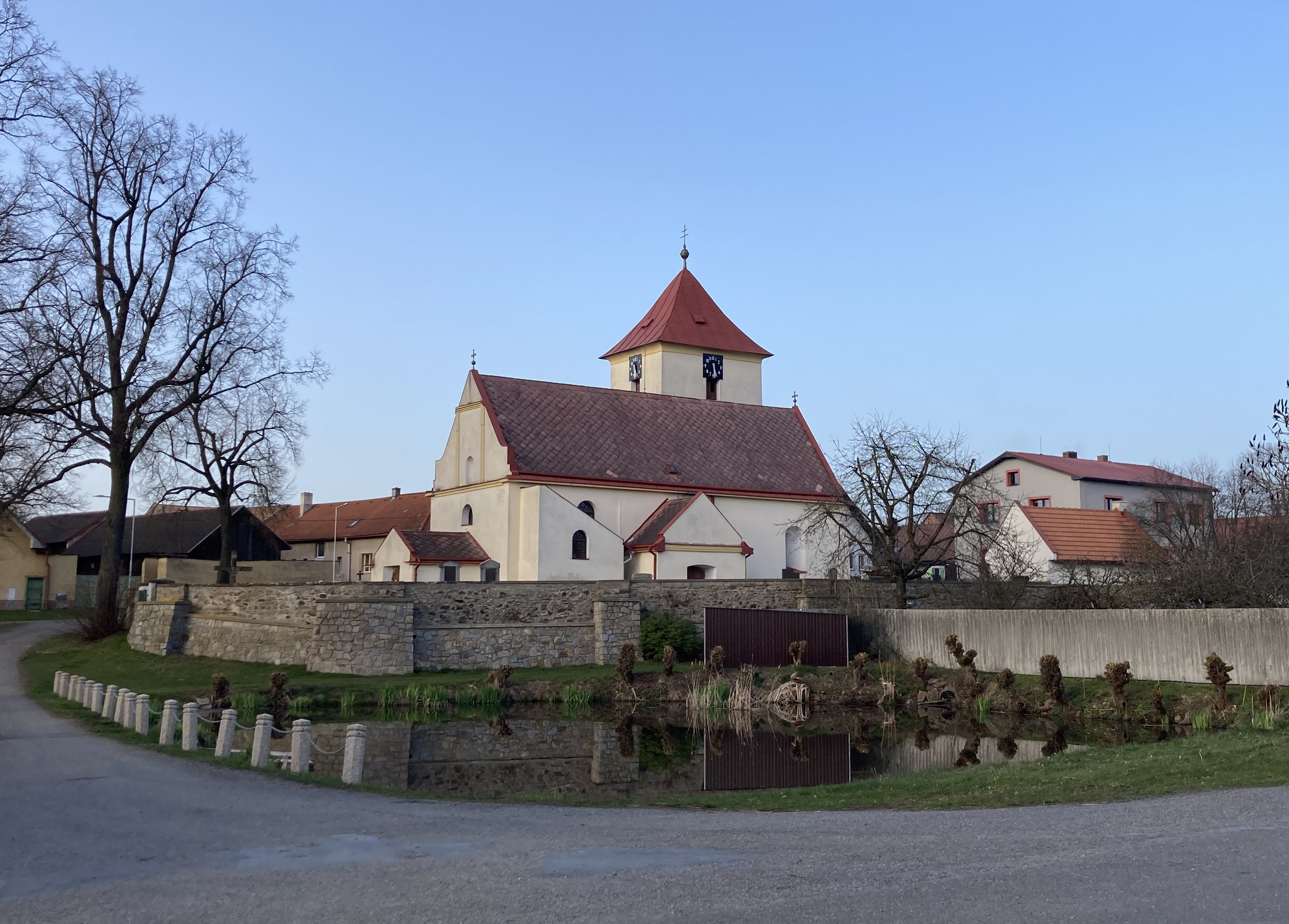
- Church of Saint Michael the Archangel

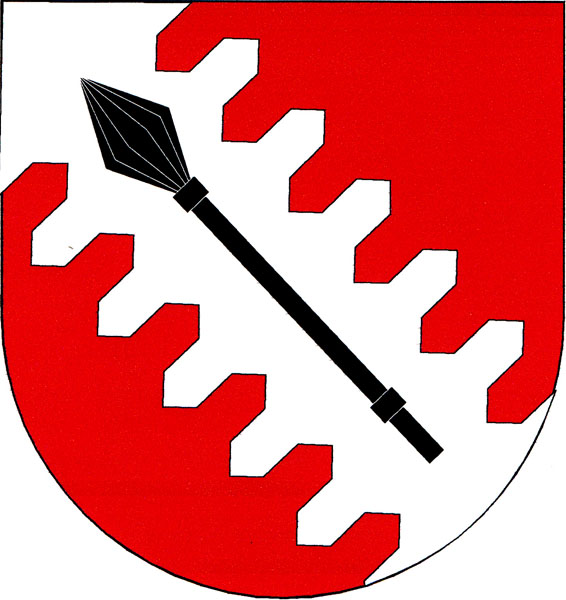
- Flag Coat of arms

- Location in the Czech Republic
- Coordinates: 49°36′38″N 15°44′7″E
- Country: Czech Republic
- Region: Vysočina
- District: Havlíčkův Brod
- First mentioned: 1303

Area
  - Total: 14.32 km^{2} (5.53 sq mi)
- Elevation: 516 m (1,693 ft)

Population (2026-01-01)
  - Total: 404
  - Density: 28.2/km^{2} (73.1/sq mi)
- Time zone: UTC+1 (CET)
  - Summer (DST): UTC+2 (CEST)
- Postal code: 582 22
- Website: www.zizkovopole.cz

Žižkovo Pole is a municipality and village in Havlíčkův Brod District in the Vysočina Region of the Czech Republic. It has about 400 inhabitants.

== Administrative division ==
Žižkovo Pole consists of two municipal parts (in brackets population according to the 2021 census):

- Žižkovo Pole (348)
- Macourov (35)

== Etymology ==
In Czech, the name Žižkovo Pole literally means "Žižka's field".

== Geography ==
Žižkovo Pole is located about 10 kilometres (6 mi) east of Havlíčkův Brod and 25 km (16 mi) northeast of Jihlava. It lies in the Upper Sázava Hills. The highest point is at 568 m (1,864 ft) above sea level.

== History ==
The first written mention of Žižkovo Pole is from 1303. The settlement was probably founded at the end of the 13th century and was mostly populated by miners.

== Demographics ==
Historical population

Year	Pop.	±%
1869	712	—
1880	783	+10.0%
1890	712	−9.1%
1900	696	−2.2%
1910	720	+3.4%

Year	Pop.	±%
1921	735	+2.1%
1930	634	−13.7%
1950	569	−10.3%
1961	496	−12.8%
1970	453	−8.7%

Year	Pop.	±%
1980	405	−10.6%
1991	368	−9.1%
2001	357	−3.0%
2011	341	−4.5%
2021	383	+12.3%

Source: Censuses

== Transport ==
The I/19 road from Havlíčkův Brod to Žďár nad Sázavou runs along the southwestern municipal border.

== Sights ==
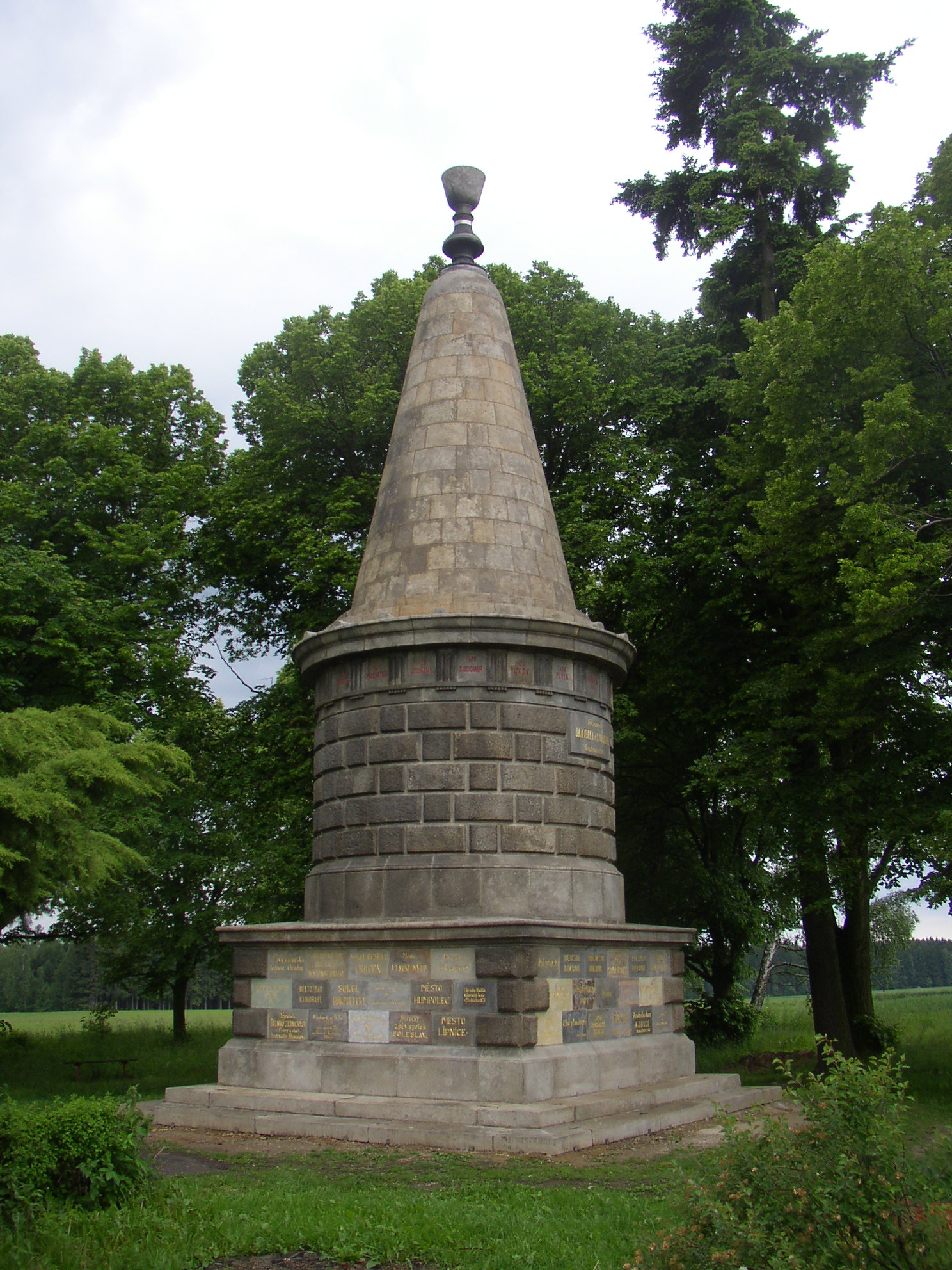
Žižka's Mound

The main landmark of Žižkovo Pole is the Church of Saint Michael the Archangel. It was an early Gothic church, rebuilt in the Baroque style around 1740.

In the southern part of the municipality, between the fields, is Žižka's Mound. It is a 16 m (52 ft) high conical memorial, which is said to be located at the place where Jan Žižka died, although today many experts dispute that this is the exact location. It dates from 1874.
