= Battle of Hořice =

Battle in the Hussite Wars

Coordinates: 50°21′53″N 15°38′40″E

- Part of the Hussite Wars
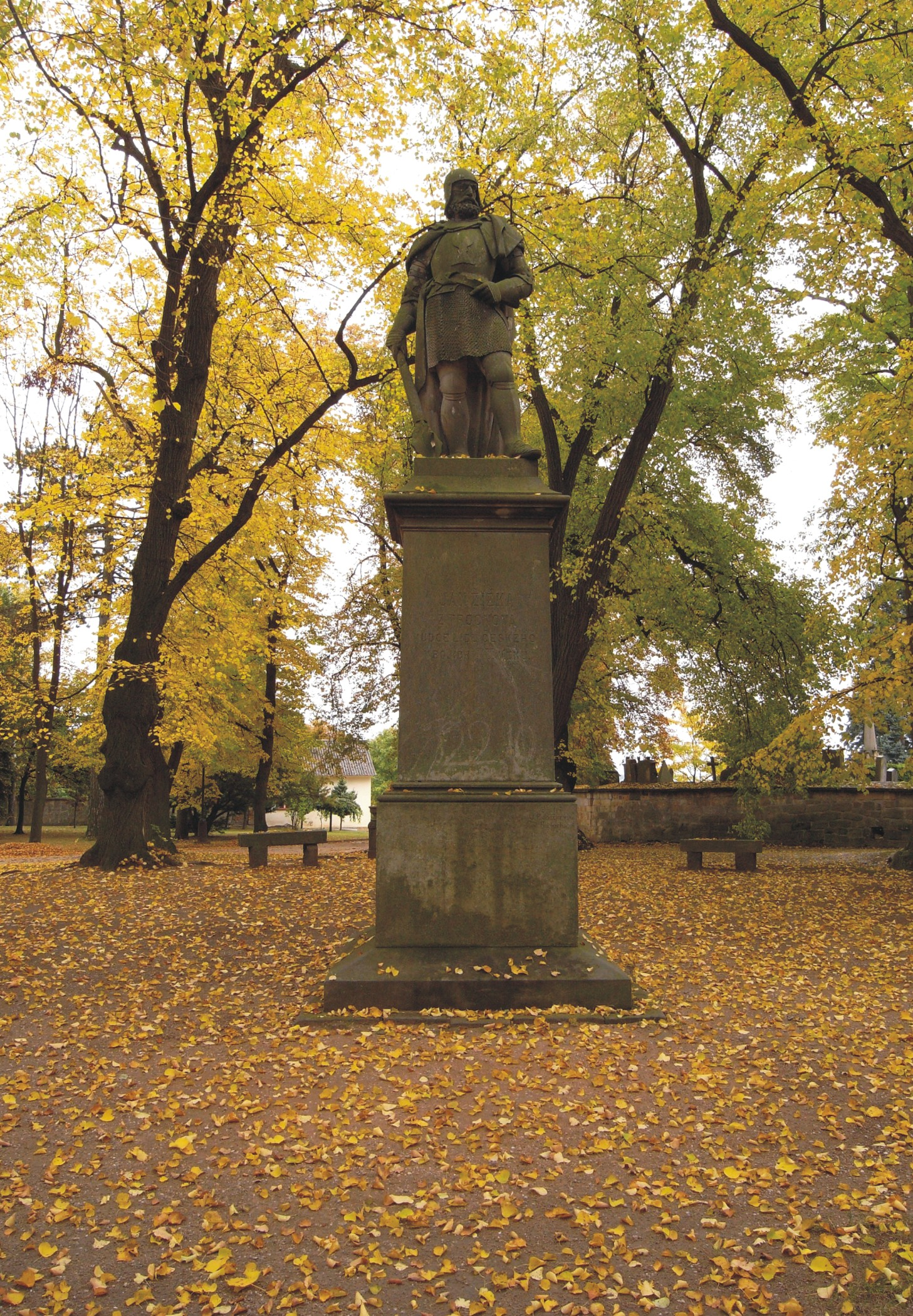
- Memorial to the Battle of Hořice
Date	27 April 1423
Location	Hořice
Result	Decisive Hussite victory

Belligerents
Orebites	Bohemian nobility

Commanders and leaders
Jan Žižka; Diviš Bořek of Miletínek	Čeněk von Wartenberg

Strength
2,700 infantry 300 cavalry 120 War wagons	3,000 cavalry with some wagons and cannon

Casualties and losses
Unknown	Heavy

The Battle of Hořice (German name: Horschitz) was fought on 27 April 1423, between the Orebites faction of the Hussites and Bohemian Catholics. The Hussites were led by Jan Žižka (who was completely blind at the time of the battle), while the Catholics were led by the repeatedly-converting Čeněk of Wartenberg. The battle took place on the Gothard plateau, near Hořice. Thanks to a strategic position, which allowed perfect use of Hussite war wagons and Žižka's tactical skills, the Hussites eventually won the battle.

Hussites took the high ground and built their wagon fort there. The Catholic cavalry could not ride up such a steep hill and was forced to dismount. The cannons owned by the nobles could not fire effectively uphill. These circumstances made it a battle between infantry behind fortifications and heavily armored infantry in the field. Žižka's men held the Wagenburg against repeated attacks by dismounted cavalry. Then, Žižka decided that the time was right to counterattack. With some cavalry, the Hussites charged downhill and swept Catholic forces from the battlefield.
