= Slověnice =

- Municipality
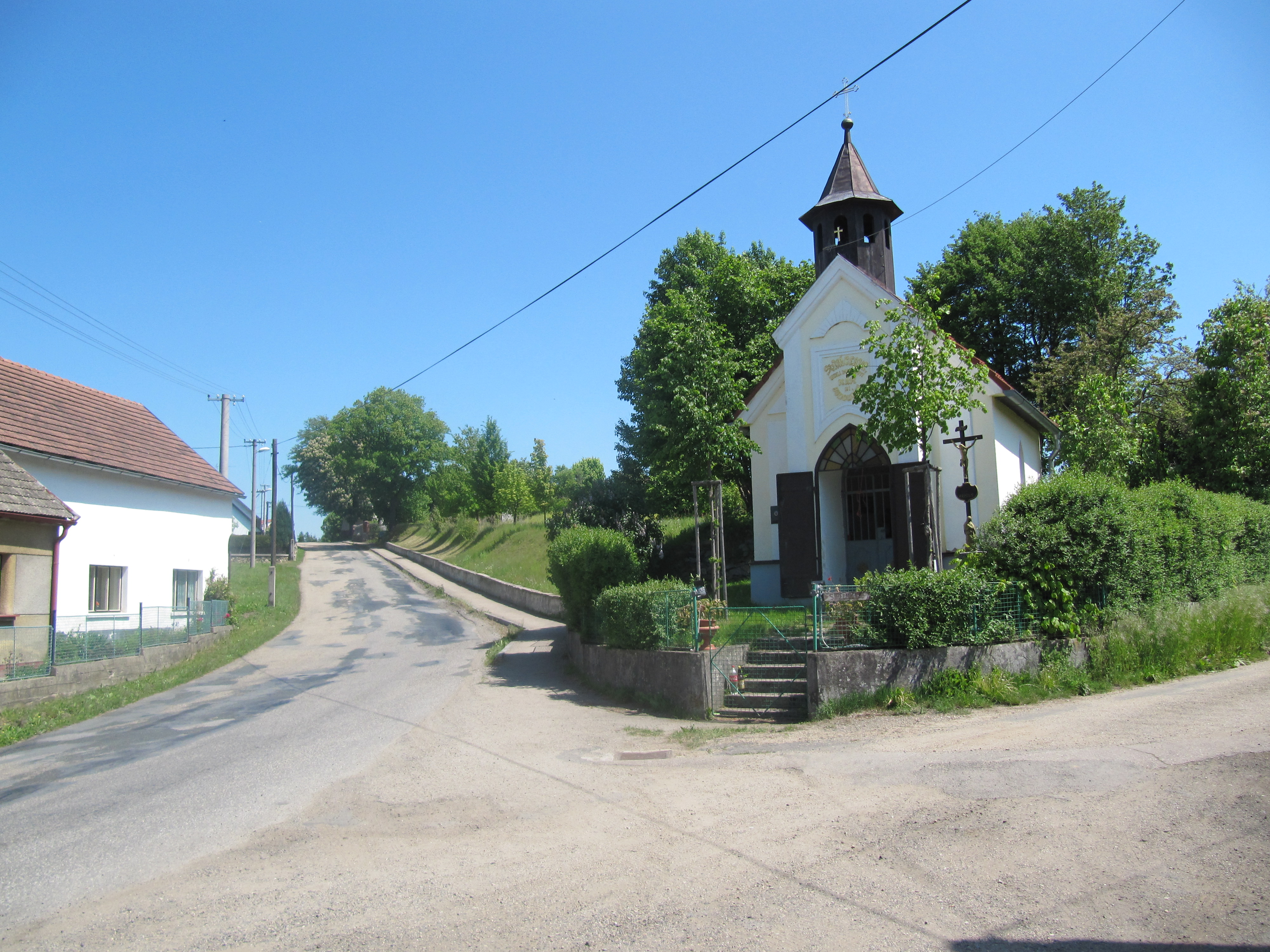
- Chapel of Saint Wenceslaus

- Location in the Czech Republic
- Coordinates: 49°45′26″N 14°53′7″E
- Country: Czech Republic
- Region: Central Bohemian
- District: Benešov
- First mentioned: 1544

Area
  - Total: 2.95 km^{2} (1.14 sq mi)
- Elevation: 368 m (1,207 ft)

Population (2026-01-01)
  - Total: 50
  - Density: 17/km^{2} (44/sq mi)
- Time zone: UTC+1 (CET)
  - Summer (DST): UTC+2 (CEST)
- Postal code: 257 26
- Website: www.slovenice.cz

Slověnice is a municipality and village in Benešov District in the Central Bohemian Region of the Czech Republic. It has about 50 inhabitants.

== Demographics ==
Historical population
Year	Pop.	±%
1869	172	—
1880	188	+9.3%
1890	174	−7.4%
1900	163	−6.3%
1910	139	−14.7%
1921	152	+9.4%
1930	150	−1.3%
1950	92	−38.7%
1961	98	+6.5%
1970	85	−13.3%
1980	59	−30.6%
1991	41	−30.5%
2001	39	−4.9%
2011	47	+20.5%
2021	30	−36.2%
Source: Censuses
