= Lawrence of Březová =

Late medieval poet and historian of the Hussite movement

- Vavřinec z Březové
- Born: Březová
- Died: Prague
- Occupations: Poet and writer
- Writing career
- Pen name: Laurencius de Brzezova, Lawrence of Brezova
- Language: Latin and Czech
- Movement: Hussite movement

Lawrence of Březová (Czech: Vavřinec z Březové; around 1370 – around 1437) was a Czech writer of Hussite period, author of Carmen insignis Corone Bohemie and Historia Hussitica. He wrote in Czech and Latin. He was a historian of the Hussite movement. His works are usually regarded as more or less reliable.

== Life ==
Lawrence was born in Březová, today a part of Úmonín near Kutná Hora. Date of birth, and death are not known exactly (date of birth around 1370, last documented day of his life is 6 July 1437.) He was a lower nobleman. He studied at Prague University where he gained his bachelor's degree in 1389 and master's degree in 1394. In 1391, he was ordained by Pope Boniface IX, at an uncanonical age of twenty, and consequently on 17 May 1391 the Pope assigned him to the parish of Louny.

In the 1390s he started his service at the side of the King Wenceslaus IV of Bohemia (probably until his death in 1419). He was also a supporter of the Hussites. He was an opponent of Sigismund Korybut and therefore forced to leave Prague in 1427. Around that year he translated the Prague-Old Town privilegia, which were abolished in 1434. During the request for the reinstitution of the emperor (1436) these privileges were reinstated thanks to the testimony of Lawrence.

== Work ==
- Carmen insignis Coronae Bohemiae pro tropheo sibi divinitus concesso circa Ryzmberg et Domazlic (Song about the victory in Domažlice), original, a Latin poem about the Battle of Domažlice, which happened on 14 August 1431 and during which a part of participants of the 4th Crusade allegedly fled before they have even the Hussite army.
- Historia Hussitica – Latin chronicle about the Hussite movement, in which the author is writing from the perspective of Prague Hussites. In his writing he was against both the Holy Roman Emperor Sigismund, but also against the radical Hussites. The unfinished chronicle depicts the period between the years 1414 and 1422, with the biggest importance given to the period of 1419 to 1420. This politically and factually comprehensive work is the longest source about the early phase of the Hussite movement and one of the most significant literary works of the Hussite movement.

He also translated Latin works into Czech, with his translations usually deemed of high quality. He translated mostly during the time when he worked in the court, where he, e.g., translated the so-called Travels of Sir John Mandeville. He also translated Somniarium Slaidae (Czech: Snář velmi pěkný). from Latin, which itself was itself a translation of an eight-century Arabic treatise by Muhamed ben Sirin. Authorship of so-called Budyšínský rukopis is wrongly attributed to him.

== Sources ==
- Marcela K. Perett, Preachers, Partisans, and Rebellious Religion, Chapter 7. Writing History to Shape the Future: Historia Hussitica by Lawrence of Březová and Historia Bohemica by Aeneas Silvius Piccolomini, pp. 192–214
- Josephus Emler, Fontes rerum bohemicarum: Prameny dějin českých, Volume 5, Prague, 1893, pp. XX (Introduction), pp. 327–563 (Hussite Chronicle and the Carmen insignis)
- Thiago de Aguiar & Davi da Silva, (2016), A CRÔNICA HUSSITA DE VAVŘINEC Z BŘEZOVÉ E SUA AUTOIMAGEM NACIONALISTA TCHECA. Revista de história. 381–405. 10.11606/issn.2316-9141.rh.2015.115379.

== Studies ==
- Krýchová, Petra, Žena v očích Vavřince z Březové (Woman in eyes Vavřinec z Březové)
- Dana Martínková, Příspěvek k jazykové charakteristice latinských spisů Vavřince z Březové, in Listy filologické / Folia philologica Roč. 105, Čís. 4 (1982), pp. 228–232
