= Libenice =

- Municipality
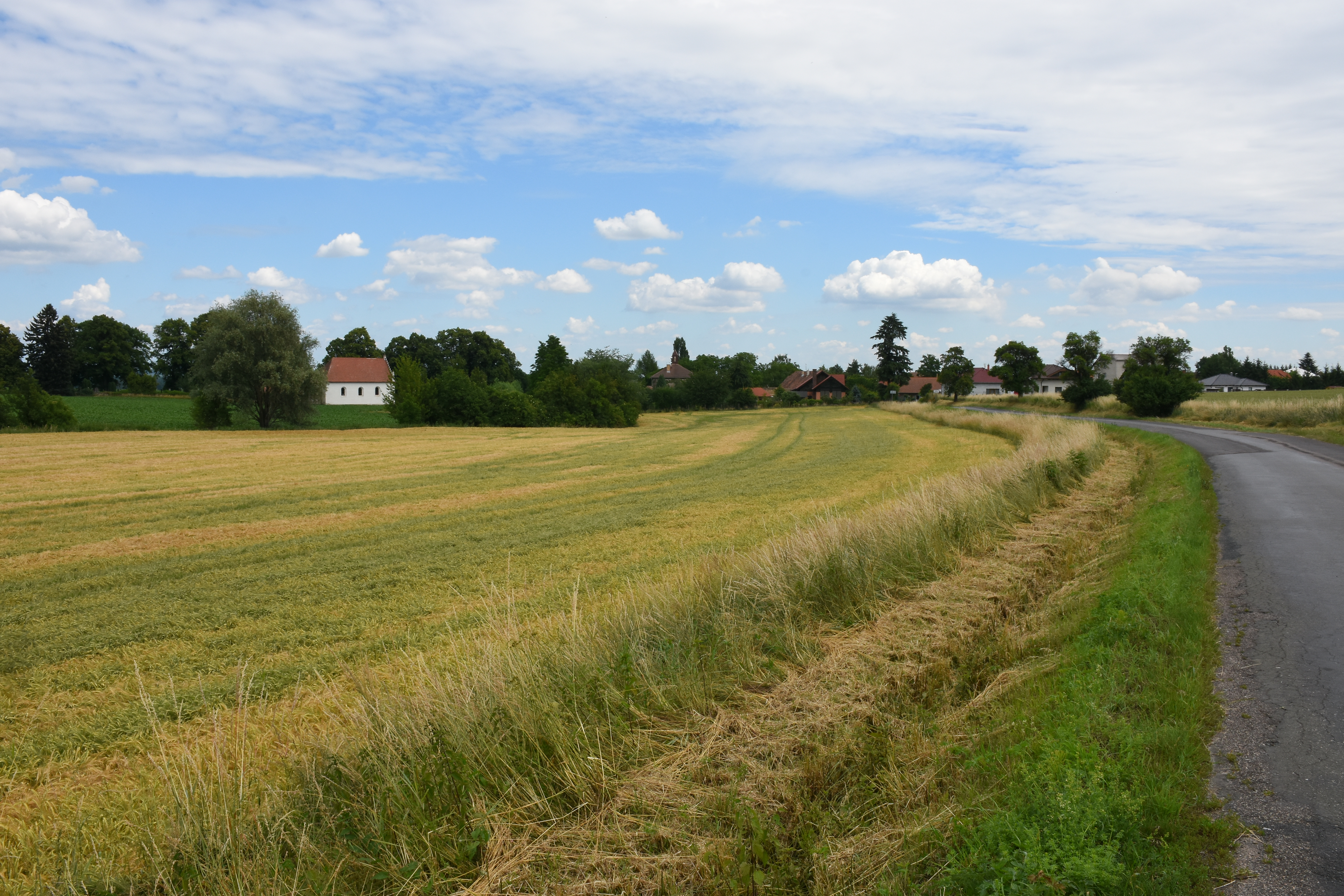
- View from the west

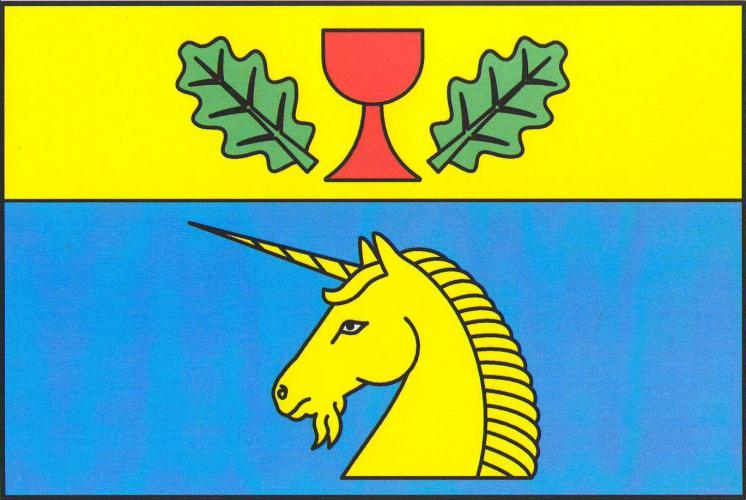
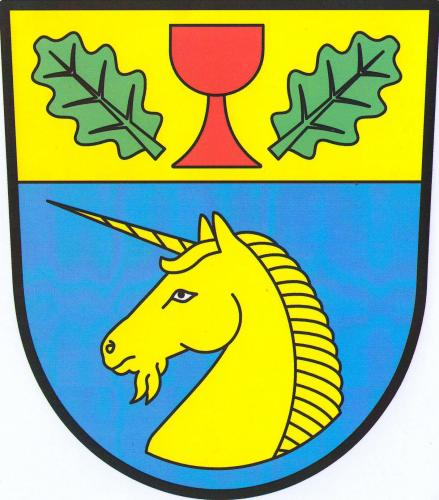
- Flag Coat of arms

- Location in the Czech Republic
- Coordinates: 49°59′4″N 15°15′29″E
- Country: Czech Republic
- Region: Central Bohemian
- District: Kolín
- First mentioned: 1142

Area
  - Total: 4.82 km^{2} (1.86 sq mi)
- Elevation: 221 m (725 ft)

Population (2026-01-01)
  - Total: 323
  - Density: 67.0/km^{2} (174/sq mi)
- Time zone: UTC+1 (CET)
  - Summer (DST): UTC+2 (CEST)
- Postal code: 280 02
- Website: www.libenice.cz

Libenice (German: Libenitz) is a municipality and village in Kolín District in the Central Bohemian Region of the Czech Republic. It has about 300 inhabitants.

== Etymology ==
The initial name of the village was Ljubenice. The name was derived from the personal name Ljuben, who was probably a local nobleman.

== Geography ==
Libenice is located about 5 kilometres (3 mi) southeast of Kolín, 4 km (2 mi) north of Kutná Hora and 51 km (32 mi) east of Prague. It lies in a flat agricultural landscape in the Central Elbe Table. The stream Hořanský potok flows through the municipality.

== History ==
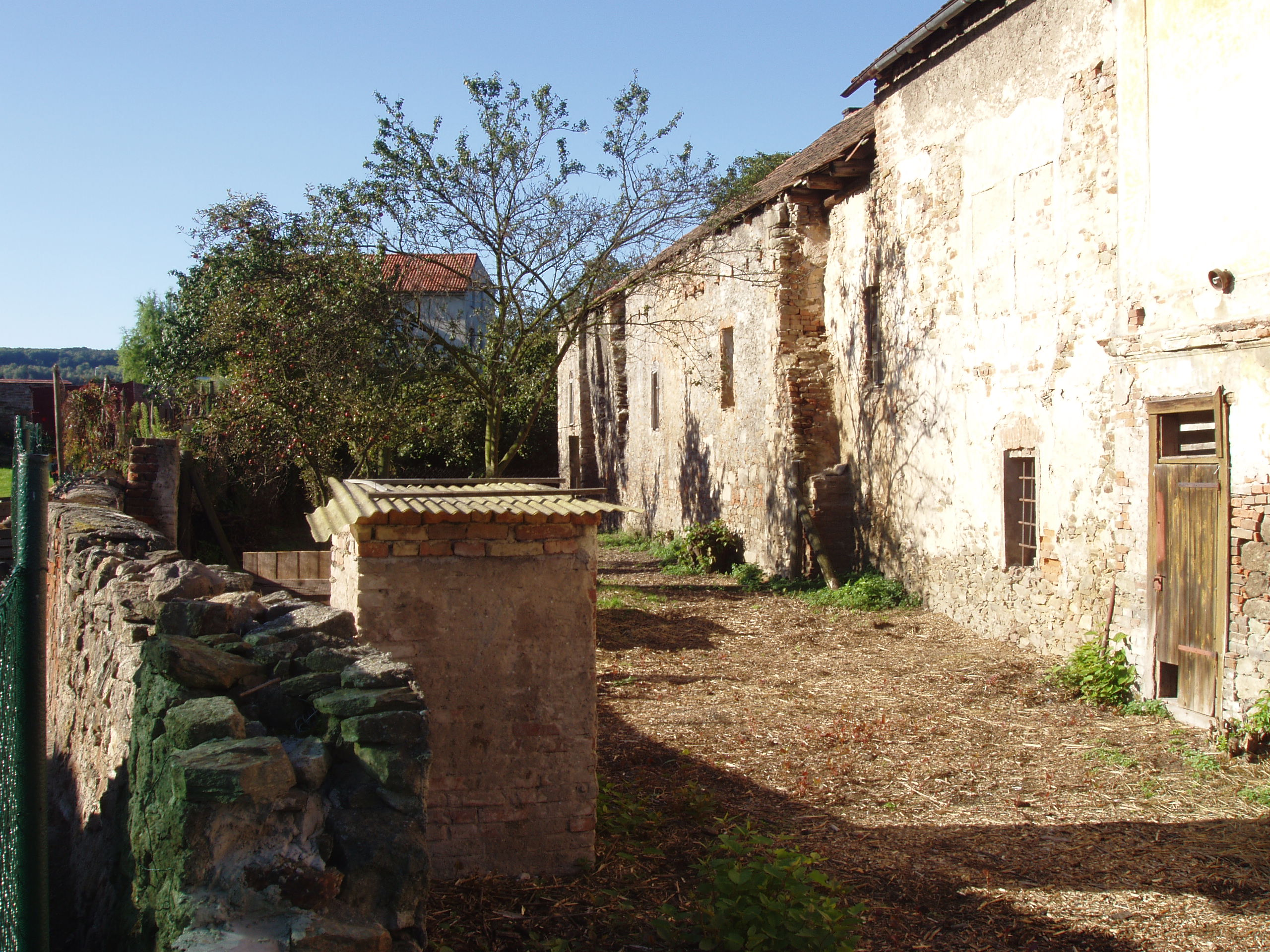
Former fortress

Archaeological finds show that the area was populated by Celts during the Hallstatt and La Tène periods. At the Celtic settlement site between Libenice and Kaňk (a part of Kutná Hora), numerous ceramic finds from the 5th–1st century BC were discovered in 1981. In 1959, an elongated area north of the village was discovered with the grave of a 50-year-old woman buried with plenty of bronze jewelry and a two-metre long stone stele made of yellowish and ocher-coloured mica migmatite with tourmaline, which probably indicates a Celtic sanctuary; recent findings in archaeology tend to point to a rectangular earthwork. In 1993 roughly ten graves from the Celtic period were found near this site by grave robbers.

The first written mention of Libenice is from 1142 as the possession of the Cistercian Sedlec Abbey. In 1396, the monastery sold the Libenice estate to King Wenceslaus IV. The local fortress was built in 1401 at the latest. In 1422, King Sigismund pledged the property to Erkinger of Seinsheim. The subsequent pawn owners of the Libenice estate were Hanuš of Rychnov from 1437, and Hynek and Pavel of Zaloňov from 1440 to 1454.

In 1498 King Vladislaus II mortgaged Libenice to Bohuš Kostka of Postupice, then the village often changed owners, who were mostly lower aristocrats. From 1540 to 1589, it was owned by the Libenický of Vrchoviště family. In 1593, Emperor Rudolf II acquired Libenice and joined it to the Kolín estate. Apart from 1611 to 1616, Libenice remained part of the Kolín estate until the abolition of the patrimonial administration in 1848. In 1778, the Libenice yard was abolished and parceled out.

In 1801, a public school was opened in Libenice. It was closed in 1965. From 1862, there was also a private Protestant school, but it was closed in 1921 due to insufficient number of students.

After the abolition of patrimonial rule, Libenice together with Grunta formed a municipality in the Kolín District. On 1 January 1992, Grunta separated from Libenice and formed an independent municipality.

== Demographics ==
Historical population

| Year | Pop. | ±% |
|---|---|---|
| 1869 | 487 | — |
| 1880 | 524 | +7.6% |
| 1890 | 616 | +17.6% |
| 1900 | 608 | −1.3% |
| 1910 | 582 | −4.3% |

| Year | Pop. | ±% |
|---|---|---|
| 1921 | 539 | −7.4% |
| 1930 | 547 | +1.5% |
| 1950 | 399 | −27.1% |
| 1961 | 374 | −6.3% |
| 1970 | 326 | −12.8% |

| Year | Pop. | ±% |
|---|---|---|
| 1980 | 274 | −16.0% |
| 1991 | 245 | −10.6% |
| 2001 | 260 | +6.1% |
| 2011 | 292 | +12.3% |
| 2021 | 294 | +0.7% |

Source: Censuses

== Transport ==
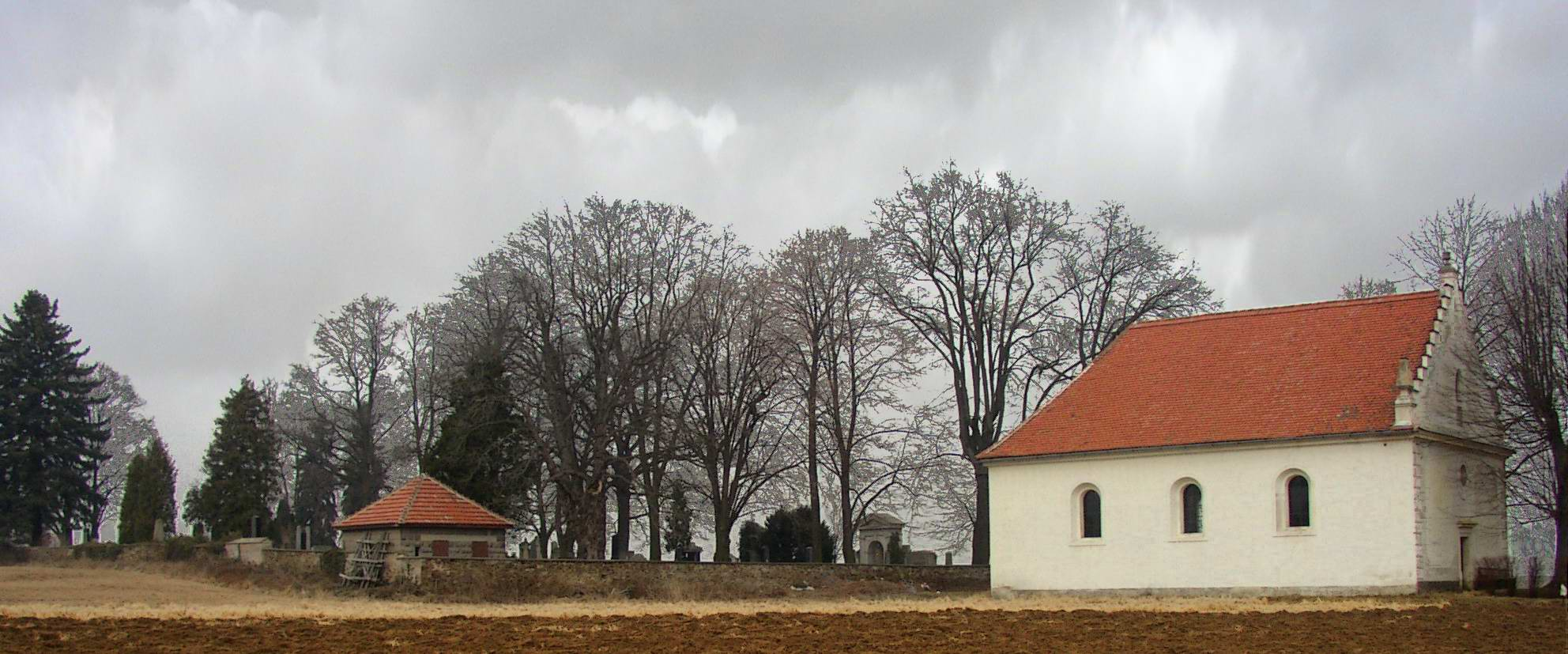
Evangelical church and cemetery

The I/38 road from Kutná Hora to Kolín runs north of the village.

== Sights ==
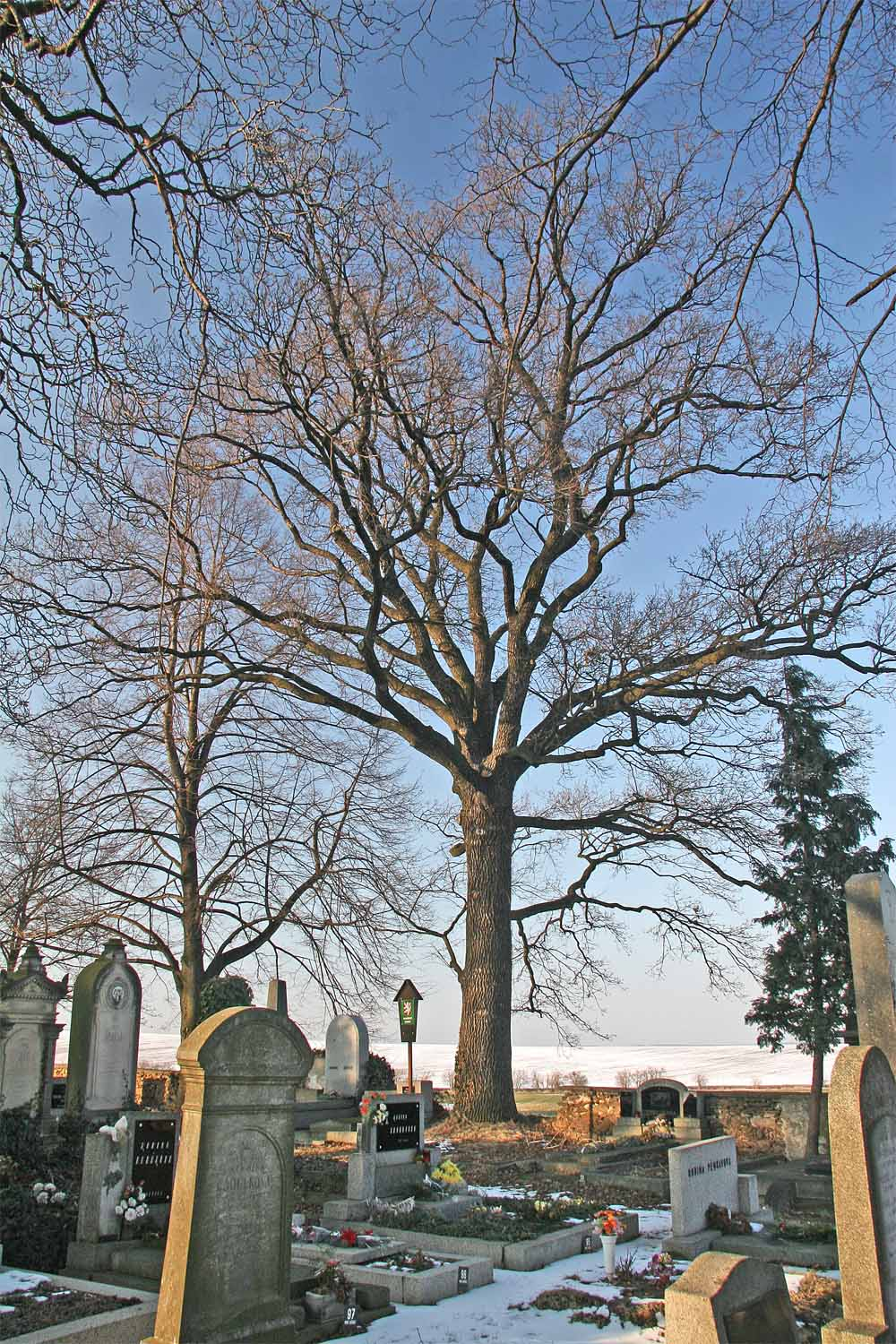
Libenice Oak

The most valuable building is the remnant of a Renaissance fortress. The fortress from the end of the 14th century was rebuilt by Jan Libenický of Vrchoviště in 1574. The fortress burned down in 1643. The three-winged building was then reconstructed and used as an outbuilding.

The Evangelical church was built on the western outskirts in 1826–1827. Near the church is the evangelical cemetery with Libenice Oak. This protected common oak was planted around 1824, is 22 m (72 ft) high and has a trunk circumference of 298 cm (117 in).

There is a menhir in the village common that is a replica of the stele found in the archaeological site. A local artist created it at the end of the 20th century.
