= Bohuslav Bílejovský =

Bohuslav Bílejovský (c. 1480 – 1555) was a Czech Utraquist historian and theologian.

== Biography ==
Bohuslav Bílejovský was born in the village of Malín (today part of Kutná Hora). He was ordained in Italy and served in Mělník, Čáslav, Kutná Hora and Prague. He grew up probably in Kutná Hora, he was consecrated probably in Italy. Afterwards he worked in priestly positions in Kutná Hora, Čáslav, Mělník and from the beginning of the 1530s he is mentioned in Prague, where he even worked for a short time in the lower consistory, then temporarily in Tábor (where he was supposed to counteract the Lutheran influence spread by the priest Martin Hánek from Bethlehem). He lived out his illness with his friend Pavel Bydžovský-Smetana at the rectory of St. Havel.

He was elected to the Consistory in 1534, and died in 1555.

He is the author of Kronyka česká (The Bohemian Chronicle), published in Nuremberg in 1547.
