= Vera Prasilova Scott =

American photographer (1899–1996)

Vera Prasilova Scott (Czech: Věra Prášilová) (March 25, 1899 – January 31, 1996) was a Czech-American photographer and sculptor. Her main work, which consisted of shadowed, gelatin silver photographs of Houstonian upper class society and intellectuals, has been preserved at the Rice University Woodson Research Center, the Museum of Czech Literature, and the Portland Museum of Art.

== Early life ==
Vera was one of seven children born in Kutná Hora, Bohemia in the modern Czech Republic to a professor and a school teacher. In 1910, she was able to enter high school in Prague at Charles University and took an interest in photography and cloth making. At the age of 18, she took an apprenticeship with a well-known Czech photographer Frantisek Drtikol and developed her technique in silver halide and bromide photography. After earning a Journeyman's certificate during her apprenticeship, she continued her academic training at Graphics Art School of Munich in Germany. While in Munich, she met her future husband Dr. Arthur F. Scott, who at the time was conducting postdoctoral research at the Ludwig-Maximilians-Universität München as a Harvard Fellow in Chemistry. She graduated with a master's degree and a first prize award in photography in little over a year and returned to Prague to begin her photography career.

== Photography career ==
For a few months Prasilova worked under Tan Stenc to produce photographs for the Ministry of Education of the newly formed Czech Republic, but in 1924 Dr. Arthur F. Scott returned to the United States as a Reed College faculty member and Vera Prasilova followed him. She settled in New York City where she worked as a still photographer for Famous Players–Lasky, while studying at Columbia University. Vera and Scott later reunited in Portland, Oregon and were married in 1925. It was that same year that Scott received an appointment to the Rice Institute (now Rice University) and the couple relocated to Houston, Texas in 1926.

Once in Houston, Prasilova opened a photography studio on San Jacinto St. and soon became well known for her portraits, whose "highlights and shadows, finished in oil or gum print have the effect of a rich charcoal. Her subjects (were) not posed in a 'look pleasant' stereotype, but their moods are caught and held and veiled just enough to capture their allurement," Much of Prasilova's clientele included faculty of the Rice Institute, locals of social and political stature and their families as well as visiting celebrities, including Bertrand Russell and Maurice Ravel. Several of Prasilova's portraits were included in the Pacific International Salon of Photographic Art, which hung at the Museum of Art, Portland, Oregon and Art Galleries of Oregon at Eugene in the fall of 1930. Her work was also exhibited at the Museum of Fine Arts, Houston in 1931 and 1932. She also showed her work in the "27th Convention" in Schenectady, NY, 1932, where her work received an Award of Merit. In 1989, Prasilova's photographic portraits were included in the exhibition Frantisek Drtikol and His Pupils at the Museum of Czech Literature in Prague, Czechoslovakia. Her work is also in the permanent collections of the Portland Museum of Art, Portland, Oregon and the Museum of Czech Literature in Prague, Czechoslovakia.

== Sculptural career ==
In 1937, the Scotts moved back to Portland, Oregon, where Dr. Arthur F. Scott had accepted a professorship in Chemistry at Reed College. By this time, the Scotts had a family of three girls. Prasilova Scott interrupted her artistic activities to care for her husband and three daughters and to be more involved with the academic and social elements of the city of Portland. While at Reed, Prasilova Scott studied calligraphy with Mr.Lloyd Reynolds and began her career in sculpture. In 1962–64, when Dr. Scott was on sabbatical at the National Science Foundation, Vera studied sculpture at the Corcoran Museum School in Washington D.C., under Hans Warnecke. Upon returning to Portland, she continued her studies in metalwork and jewelry making with Fredric Littman and bronze casting with James L. Hansen at Portland State University. While at Reed, Mrs. Scott started switched to sculpture as her artistic outlet and began to produce works in bronze and wax that reflected her humanitarian response to social, political, and emotional events of the time. In the series Migrations, the scriptures Bangladesh, The Road from Phnom Penh, and Exodus, Mrs. Scott represents "the nameless, faceless families of refugees leaving their homeland." Soon Mrs. Scott's sculptures garnered a similar reputation to her photographs and received commissions from agencies to produce artistic pieces. For instance, the sculpture Exodus was commissioned by the International University of Miami(now Florida International University) to accompany The Jordan Davidson Humanitarian Awards.

== Death ==
Vera Prasilova Scott died on January 31, 1996.
