= Battle of Kutná Hora =

Battle in the Hussite Wars

Coordinates: 49°57′N 15°16′E

- Part of the Second anti-Hussite crusade, Hussite Wars
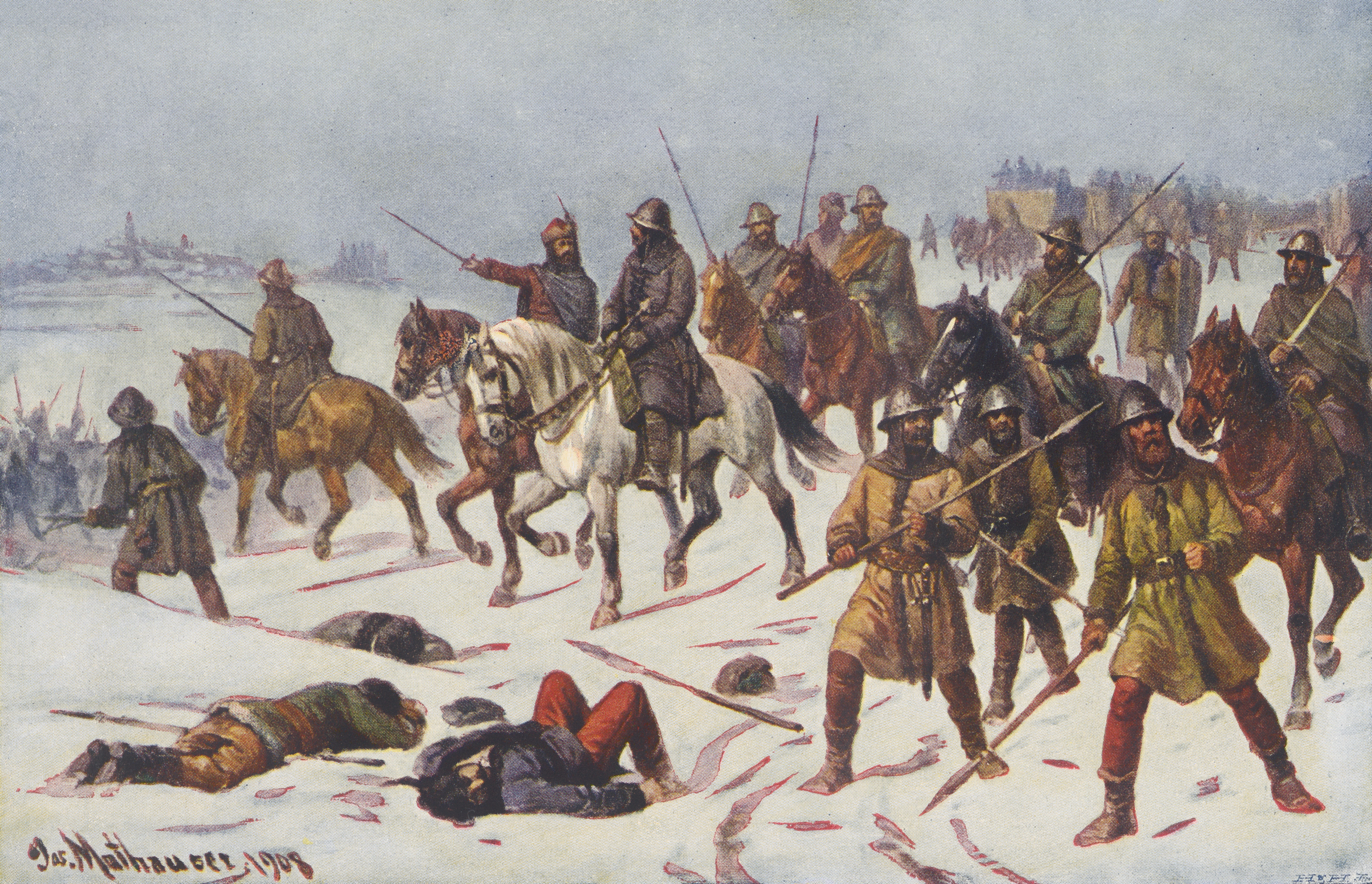
- Josef Mathauser - Jan Žižka in front of Kutná Hora
Date	21 December 1421
Location	Kutná Hora
Result	Hussite victory

Belligerents
Crusade along with Catholic loyalists: Kingdom of Hungary; Holy Roman Empire; Kingdom of Germany; Duchy of Austria; Silesian duchies; Margraviate of Moravia; Bohemian Catholic nobility	Hussite coalition: Praguers; Taborites; Orebites; Bohemian Hussite nobility

Commanders and leaders
King Sigismund; Pippo Spano	Jan Žižka

Strength
50,000–92,000: 80,000 Hungarians; 12,000 Austrians	12,000–18,000

Casualties and losses
2,000–12,000 men	Unknown, less than Catholics

The Battle of Kutná Hora (Kuttenberg) was an early battle and subsequent campaign in the Hussite Wars, fought on 21 December 1421 between German and Hungarian troops of the Holy Roman Empire and the Hussites, an early ecclesiastical reformist group that was founded in what is now the Czech Republic.

In 1419, Pope Martin V declared a crusade against the Hussites. One branch of the Hussites, known as the Taborites, formed a religious-military community at Tábor. Under the leadership of the talented general Jan Žižka, the Taborites adopted the latest weaponry available, including handguns, long, thin cannons, nicknamed "snakes", and war wagons. Their adoption of the latter gave them the ability to fight a flexible and mobile style of warfare. Originally employed as a measure of last resort, its effectiveness against the royal cavalry turned field artillery into firm part of Hussite armies.

== Battle ==
At Kutná Hora in the early winter of 1421, the Taborites were encircled by the superior forces of the Holy Roman Empire under King Sigismund. Even though Sigismund's elite heavy cavalry was kept at bay by Žižka's artillery, the Taborites apparently faced imminent destruction. However, on 21 December, Žižka grouped his war wagons into a column and charged the enemy lines. The battle wagons advanced rapidly, with all of their guns blazing. The column smashed a hole through Sigismund's line, allowing the Taborites to escape the encirclement. Sigismund decided against mounting a pursuit of the Hussites, for he incorrectly believed that they had been utterly defeated.

== Aftermath ==
Žižka, throughout the rest of December, launched numerous counter-offensives and raids on the Germans' lines. He also introduced the use of small firearms for large bodies of infantry, eventually equipping a third of his infantry. His normal tactic was to mount raids that would draw his opponent into attacking his wagon fort, then, at the right moment, sortie out of the fort with his cavalry, bowmen, and pikemen to ravage the enemy forces. His manoeuvres were quite successful, and, as a result, by the end of the month, Sigismund's demoralized army, constantly harried by Žižka's seemingly invincible soldiers, fled Bohemia.
