= Jan Erazim Vocel =

Czech poet, archaeologist, historian and cultural revivalist

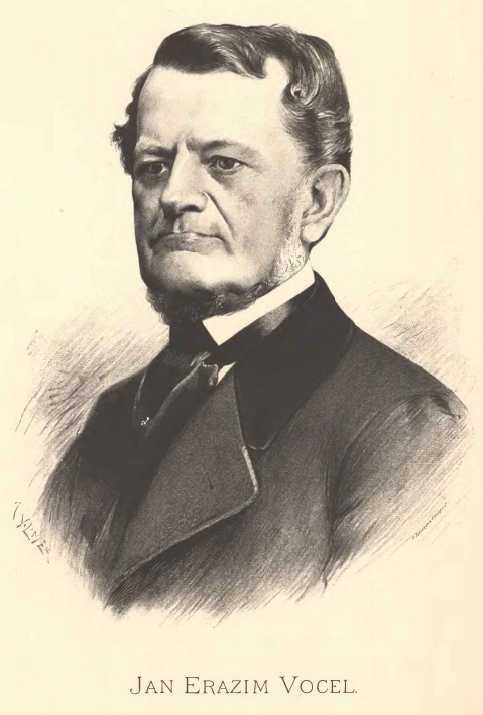
- Photo portrait by Jan Vilímek
- Born: 23 August 1802; Kutná Hora, Bohemia, Habsburg monarchy
- Died: 16 September 1871 (aged 69); Prague, Bohemia, Austria-Hungary
- Education: Charles University; University of Vienna
- Occupations: Poet, archaeologist, historian and cultural revivalist
- Years active: 1820–1871
- Spouse(s): Barbora Jaroslava Vocelová, née Štětková (m. 1843–died 1846); Matylda Vocelová, née Hovorková (m. 1849–his death, 1871)
- Children: Růžena Vocelová (c. 1844–1846); Jaromirz Vocel (*1850); Vojtěch Vocel (*1851); Adalbert Vocel (*1851); Ladislav Vocel (*1854); Ludmila Vocelová (*1860)

Jan Erazim Vocel (23 August 1802 – 16 September 1871) was a Czech poet, archaeologist, historian and cultural revivalist. Though as heir to his father's trade, he was to become a baker, his parents, observing his youthful enthusiasm for Gothic history, eventually heeded his academic calling.

== Early life ==
Vocel was born in Kutná Hora. At the age of 14, he moved to Prague to attend a Piarist college-preparatory high school. Concomitantly, he attended philosophy lectures at Charles University. Already by that time, he had begun writing fiction, of which efforts only two complete works survive—Krvočíše (Bloodshot), a romance about growing grapes in celebration of Charles IV (King of Bohemia and Holy Roman Emperor), and Harp (1875), a tragedy. On graduating, Vocel departed from Prague to Vienna, where he studied philosophy and law. In order to support himself and assist his family, Vocel accepted tutoring appointments in various homes of the ancient Bohemian Czernin family and later of other noble families, e.g., the Harrach family, where he established himself as an abiding mentor to nascent businessman/arts patron Jan Harrach (1828–1909).

On graduating from the University of Vienna, Vocel returned to Prague, where he helped to establish the Archaeological Society in 1843.

== Literature ==
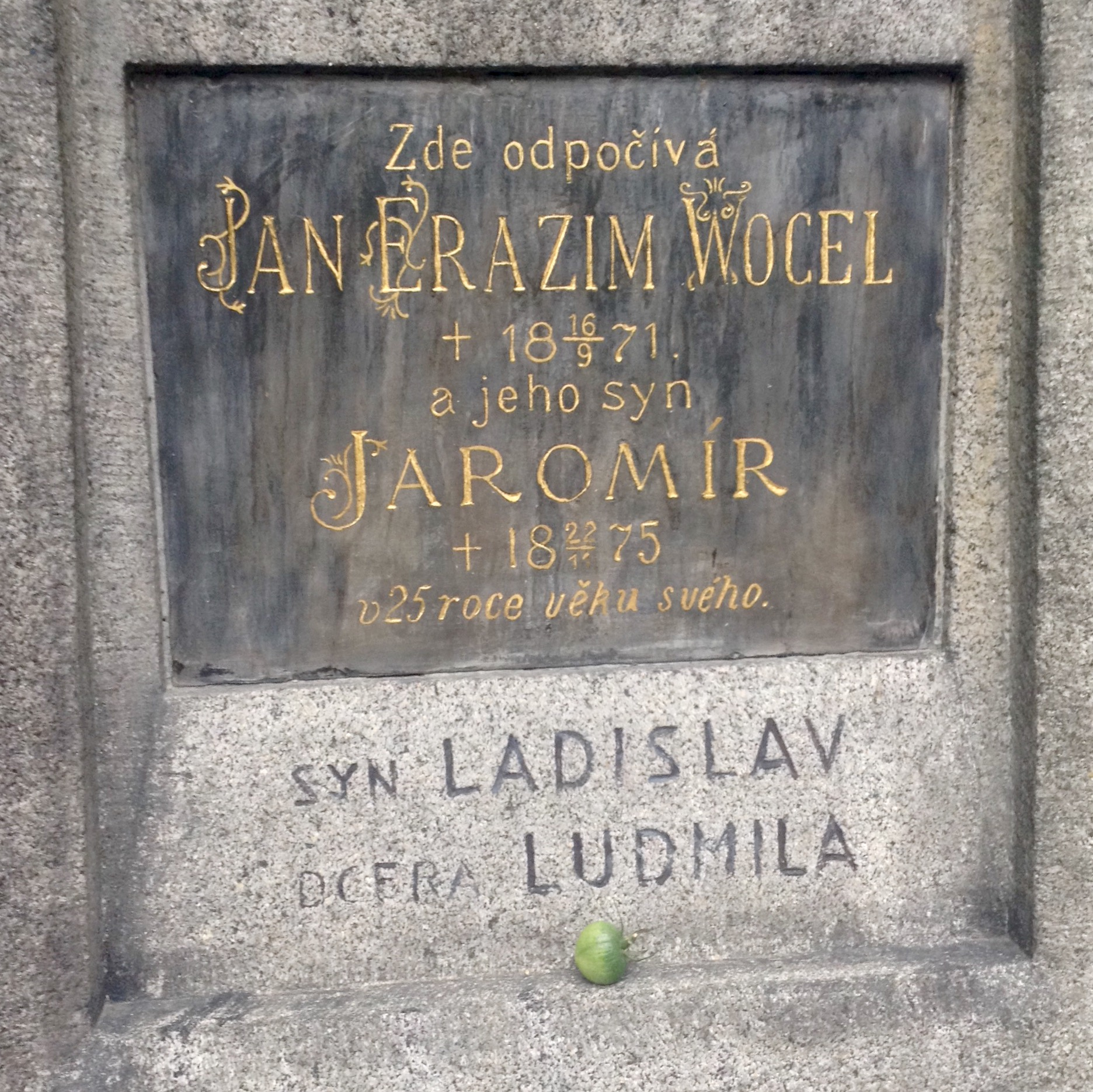
Detail of engraving on memorial stone, Olšany Cemetery, Prague, Czech Republic

Vocel's literary work reflects a pathological interest in medieval history, archaeology and historiography. By and large, his two most significant works are thought to be Poslední Orebit and Přemyslovci.

In 1850, Vocel was appointed associate professor of Archaeology and Art History at Charles University. As an author of numerous articles and scientific papers, he inadvertently introduced what would later become a widely accepted method of chemical analysis to determine the age of bronze objects.

A highlight of his literary career was the two-volume Prehistory of the Czech Lands (1866, '68), in which he posited a sound foundation for archaeology in Czech science. Though beyond its expanded description of his method of chemical analysis, the work did not offer archaeological breakthroughs or newer methods, it has exercised considerable influence abroad.

Together with Czech writer, historian, museum director, patriot and publicist Karel Vladislav Zap (1812–1871), Vocel contributed to the popularity and development of Czech archaeology through their 1854 co-founding of a specialized organ, "Archaeological Monuments" (edited by Zap from 1854 to '66), in which Czech history, from its mythic beginnings to the Hussite movement, was examined and celebrated.

In 1872, the bourgeois Czech writer Jakub Malý, an early devotee of Czech history and literature and promoter of the study of the English language, published the biography Jan Erazim Vocel.

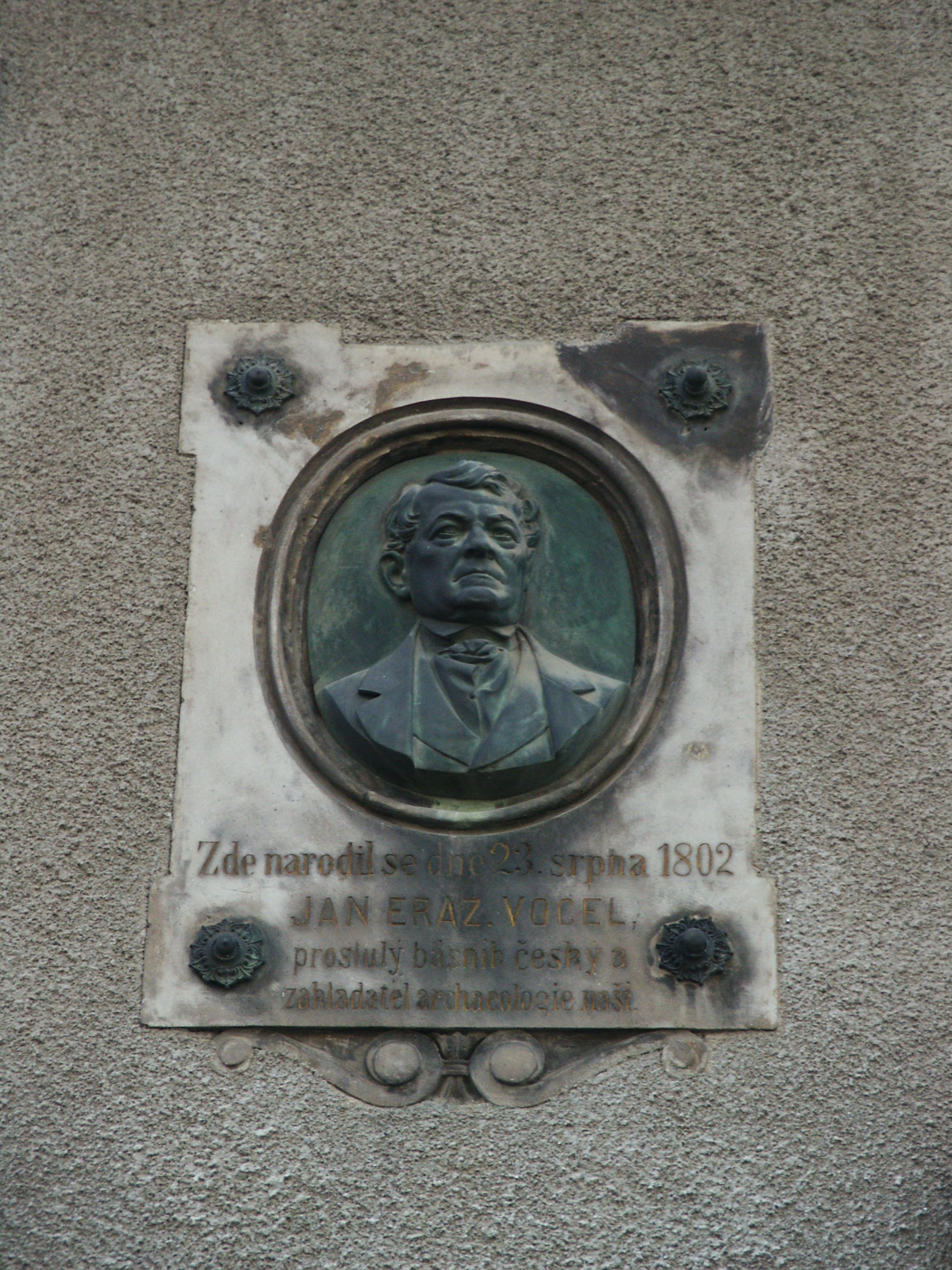
Commemorative plaque in Kutná Hora (Vocelova 349/10)

== Science ==
Vocel inadvertently pioneered a chemical method of determining the age of bronze objects. He published numerous scientific and historical-fiction books, including his two-part treatise Prehistory of the Czech Lands, which laid a foundation for scientific archaeology in the country.

== Legacy ==
Vocel died in Prague. Alongside fellow Kutná Hora natives Karel Havlíček Borovský and Josef Kajetán Tyl, he is regarded as a key figure in the 19th-century Czech National Revival.
