= Kutná Hora =

Town in Central Bohemian Region, Czech Republic

- Town
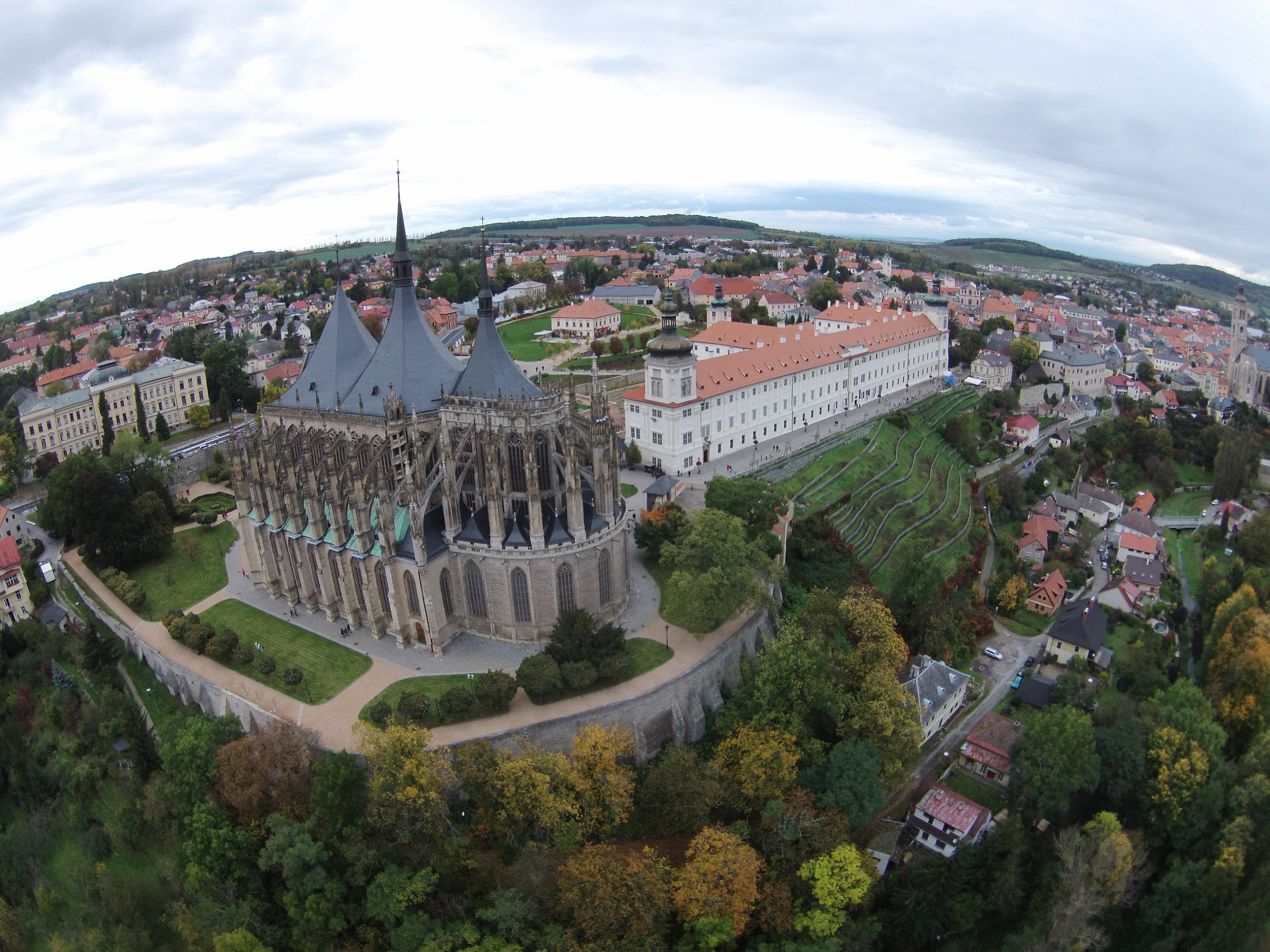
- Aerial view of Kutná Hora with the Church of Saint Barbara and Jesuit College in the front

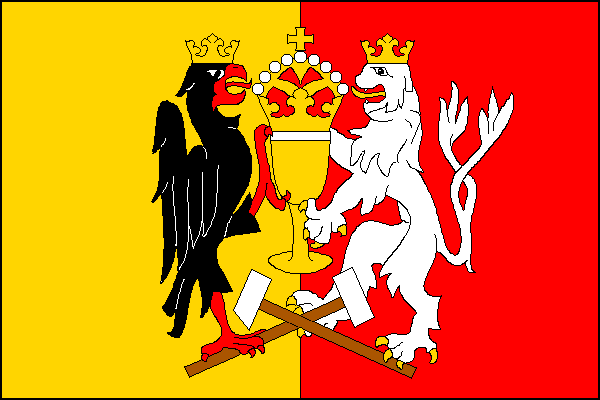
- Flag Coat of arms

- Location in the Czech Republic
- Coordinates: 49°56′54″N 15°16′6″E
- Country: Czech Republic
- Region: Central Bohemian
- District: Kutná Hora
- First mentioned: 1289

Government
  - Mayor: Lukáš Seifert (ODS)

Area
  - Total: 33.07 km^{2} (12.77 sq mi)
- Elevation: 254 m (833 ft)

Population (2026-01-01)
  - Total: 21,787
  - Density: 658.8/km^{2} (1,706/sq mi)
- Time zone: UTC+1 (CET)
  - Summer (DST): UTC+2 (CEST)
- Postal code: 284 01
- Website: www.kutnahora.cz

UNESCO World Heritage Site
- Official name: Historical Town Centre with the Church of St Barbara and the Cathedral of Our Lady at Sedlec
- Criteria: ii, iv
- Reference: 732
- Inscription: 1995 (19th Session)

Kutná Hora (Czech pronunciation: [ˈkutnaː ˈɦora]; German: Kuttenberg) is a town in the Central Bohemian Region of the Czech Republic. It has about 22,000 inhabitants. The town is located on the Vrchlice Stream, on the border between the Central Elbe Table and Upper Sázava Hills.

The history of Kutná Hora is linked to silver mining, which made it a rich and rapidly developing town. The centre of Kutná Hora, including the Sedlec Abbey and the Sedlec Ossuary, was designated a UNESCO World Heritage Site in 1995 because of its outstanding architecture and its influence on subsequent architectural developments in other Central European city centres. The historic town centre is also protected as an urban monument reservation, the fourth largest in the Czech Republic.

The large concentration of monuments and its inclusion on the UNESCO list make Kutná Hora a significant tourist destination. The town's sacral monuments are among the most important and most visited monuments in the Czech Republic. In addition to tourism, the town's economy also includes industry, which is represented by production of tobacco products and the electrical engineering industry.

== Administrative division ==
Kutná Hora consists of 12 municipal parts (in brackets population according to the 2021 census):

- Kutná Hora-Vnitřní Město (2,813)
- Hlouška (5,156)
- Kaňk (813)
- Karlov (653)
- Malín (991)
- Neškaredice (164)
- Perštejnec (52)
- Poličany (187)
- Sedlec (1,138)
- Šipší (4,439)
- Vrchlice (364)
- Žižkov (3,390)

== Etymology ==
The name of the town was derived from the eponymous mountain (hora = 'mountain'). According to legends, the name of the mountain was derived from the monks' cowls (Kutten in German, kutny in Czech). However, it is more likely that it derived from the Middle High German word kutte ('pit'). The name can also be derived from the Czech words kutit ('to work') or kutat ('to mine'), but the Czech origin of the name is less likely.

== Geography ==
Kutná Hora is located about 52 kilometres (32 mi) east of Prague. The eastern part of the municipal territory lies in a flat agricultural landscape in the Central Elbe Table. The western part lies in the Upper Sázava Hills and includes the highest point of Kutná Hora, which is the hill Malý Kuklík at 359 m (1,178 ft) above sea level. The Vrchlice Stream flows through the town.

== History ==
=== Bronze Age and Iron Age ===
Archaeological finds show that the area around the Kaňk hill was populated by Celts during the Hallstatt and La Tène periods. At the Celtic settlement site between Libenice and Kaňk, numerous ceramic finds from the 5th–1st century BC were discovered in 1981. One of the most important finds is a smelting furnace with 10 kilograms (22 lb) of slag from the 2nd–1st century BC with traces of pyrrhotine, chalcopyrite, sphalerite and copper, which also testify to early underground mining in the Kaňk hill.

=== Establishment ===
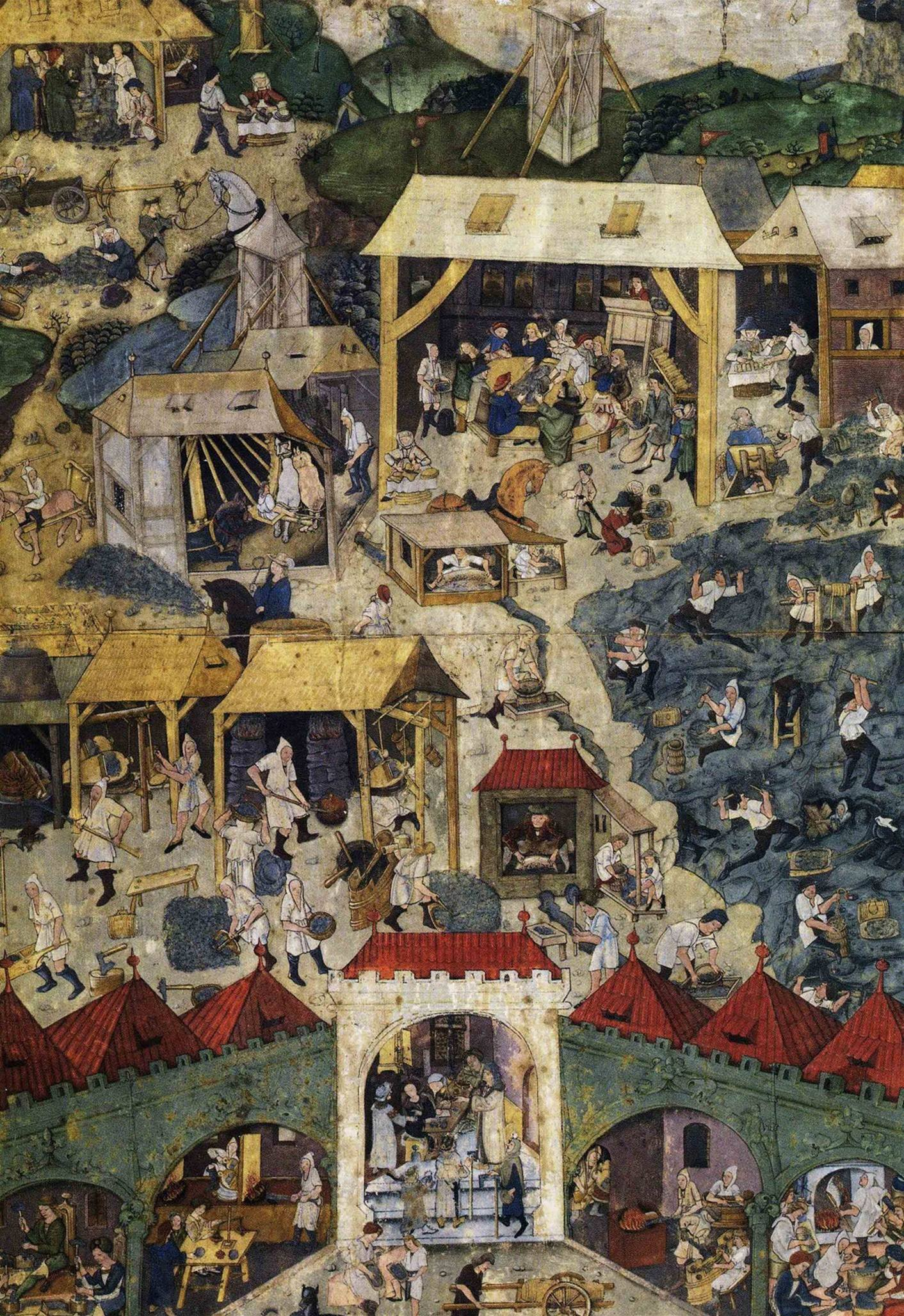
Silver mining and processing in Kutná Hora, 1490s

The earliest traces of silver have been found dating back to the 10th century, when Bohemia already had been in the crossroads of long-distance trade for many centuries. Silver dinars from the period between 985–995 were discovered in the settlement of Malín, which is now a part of Kutná Hora.

In 1142, the Sedlec Abbey, the first Cistercian monastery in Bohemia, was founded in the area of Sedlec by the monks from the Waldsassen Abbey in Bavaria. The abbey's economic problems were solved by the discovery of silver near Sedlec, which attracted new settlers, especially from nearby German-speaking regions. Silver began to be mined in 1260. In the early days of mining, several nameless settlements emerged. The first mention of Kutná Hora (under its Latin name Mons Cuthna) is from 1289.

=== Middle Ages ===
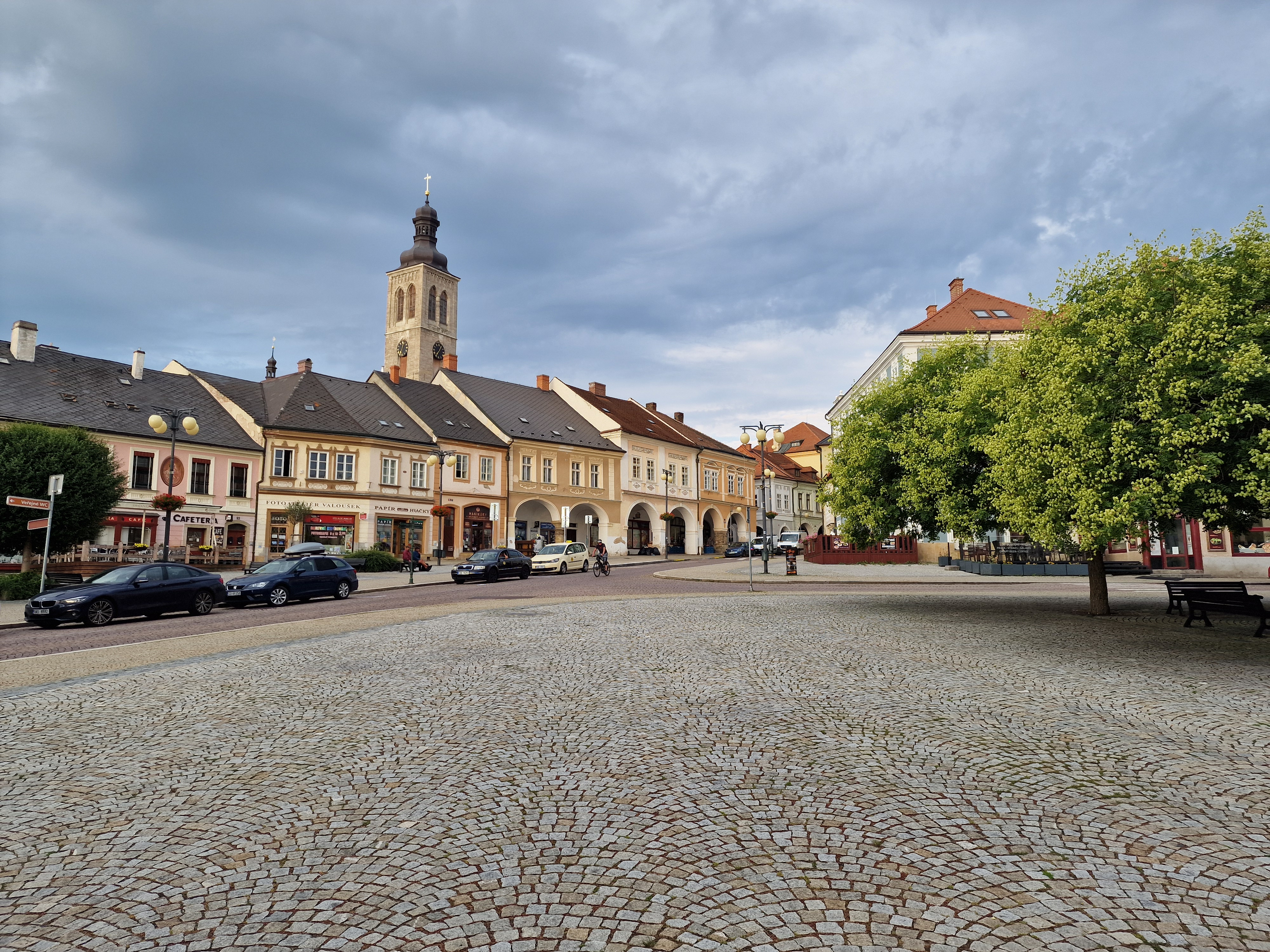
The square Palackého náměstí

In 1300, King Wenceslaus II issued the new royal mining code Ius regale montanorum. This was a legal document that specified all administrative as well as technical terms and conditions necessary for the operation of mines. Shortly after 1300, Kutná Hora became the seat of the central mint of the Czech lands, in which Prague groschen were minted. The town gradually became the second most important town of the Kingdom of Bohemia (after Prague) and its main financial centre.

In December 1402, the town was the target of King Sigismund during his conquest of Kutná Hora after the imprisonment of Wenceslaus IV. It was heavily defended by its residents. After several bloody skirmishes, Sigismund prevailed and forced the defenders to march to Kolín and kneel in subjugation. Although Sigismund was successful in his conquest, his hetman Markvart of Úlice died after being struck by an arrow during the siege of Suchdol castle on 27 December.

On 18 January 1409, King Wenceslaus IV signed the Decree of Kutná Hora in the town, by which the Czech university nation was given three votes in the elections to the faculty of Prague University as against one for the three other nations.

In 1420, Sigismund made the town the base for his unsuccessful attack on the Taborites during the Hussite Wars, leading to the Battle of Kutná Hora. The development of the town was interrupted in 1421, when the Hussites burned down the Sedlec Abbey and captured Kutná Hora. In 1422–1424, part of the German population was expelled and the town was hit by two large fires. Silver mining was restored in 1469. Religious peace of Kutná Hora was concluded in Kutná Hora in 1485.

=== 16th–19th centuries ===
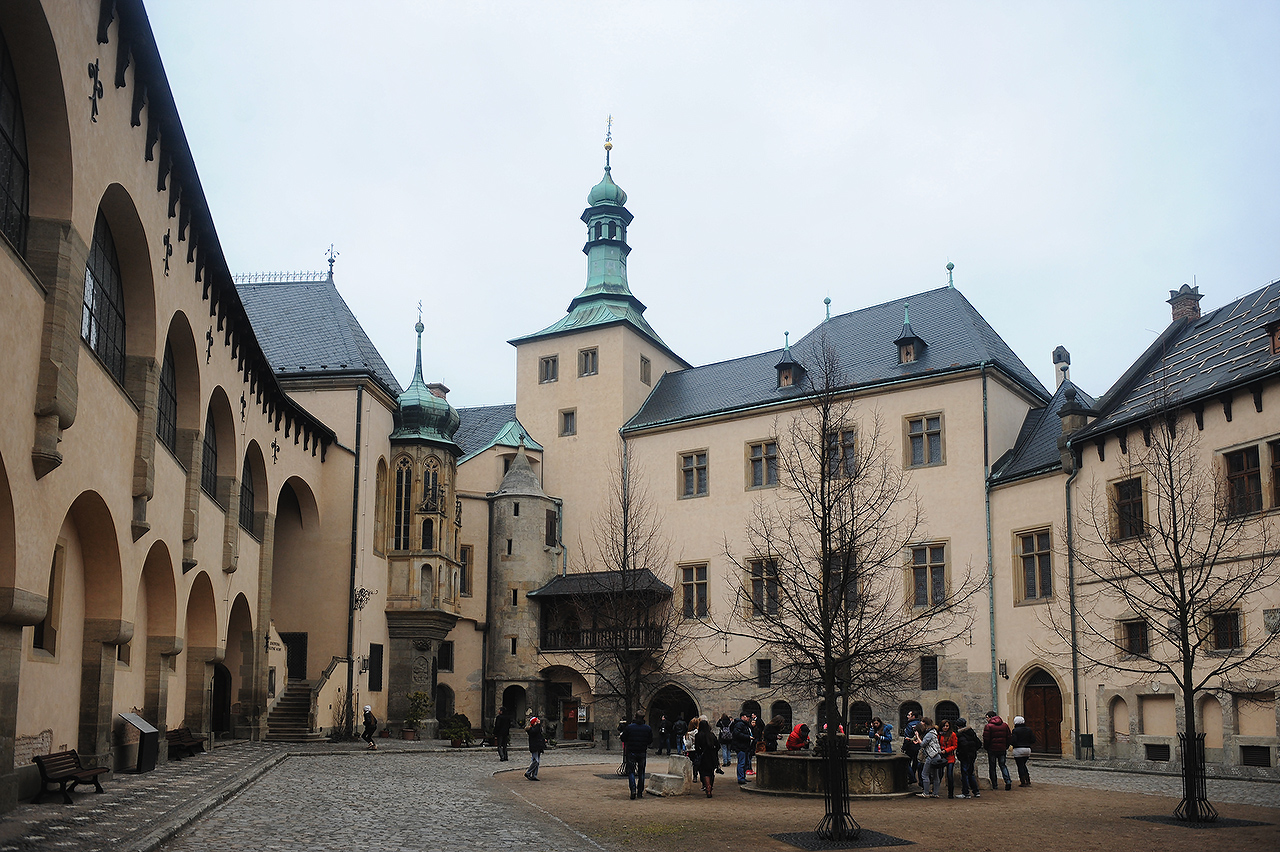
Italian Court, former royal residence and seat of the royal mint

Due to the threat of flooding in the deepest mines and the decreasing potency of silver ore, mining in Kutná Hora was reduced in the 1530s. The most important mining zone was closed in 1543. The production of the Prague groschen terminated in 1547. Despite these events, the remaining activities of the town were sufficient to ensure Kutná Hora's prosperity.

As a result of the Battle of White Mountain, religious freedom began to be violated. In 1626, the Jesuits were invited to Kutná Hora, and they built here a college. The Thirty Years' War caused economic difficulties. Mining was stopped in 1625. Two major raids by the Swedish army in 1639 and 1643 caused extensive damage to the town and a reduction in population. The town's economic recovery occurred at the end of the 1650s with the development of crafts. The town also began to be a centre of education thanks to the Jesuits.

At the beginning of the 18th century, there were attempts to open new silver mines. However, the new silver veins were thin and therefore unprofitable. In 1727, the mint was closed and Kutná Hora definitely ceased to be a mining town. At the beginning of the 19th century, Kutná Hora was still among the larger towns in the Czech lands, but its importance was declining.

=== 20th century ===
Until 1918, the town was the capital of the district of the same name in Austria-Hungary, one of the 94 Bezirkshauptmannschaften in Bohemia. Together with the rest of Bohemia, the town became part of the newly founded Czechoslovakia after World War I and the collapse of Austria-Hungary.

There was a Jewish community in Kutná Hora. In 1939–1945, during the occupation of Czechoslovakia by Nazi Germany, the community was dissolved with mass deportations, many via Theresienstadt Ghetto, and never recovered.

== Demographics ==
Historical population

Year	Pop.	±%
1869	16,565	—
1880	16,799	+1.4%
1890	17,614	+4.9%
1900	19,506	+10.7%
1910	20,362	+4.4%

Year	Pop.	±%
1921	19,112	−6.1%
1930	18,706	−2.1%
1950	15,893	−15.0%
1961	16,835	+5.9%
1970	17,943	+6.6%

Year	Pop.	±%
1980	20,927	+16.6%
1991	21,561	+3.0%
2001	21,453	−0.5%
2011	20,497	−4.5%
2021	20,162	−1.6%

Source: Censuses

== Economy ==
A factory for production of tobacco products was founded in Kutná Hora in 1812 and is located in the premises of the former Cistercian monastery in Sedlec. In 1882, production of cigarettes began. From 1992, the factory is owned by Philip Morris ČR, a subsidiary of Philip Morris International. In Kutná Hora, the company employs more than 800 people.

The largest employer with headquarters in Kutná Hora is Foxconn Technology CZ, a manufacturer of electronic components with more than 1,500 employees.

== Transport ==
The I/2 road from Prague to Pardubice runs through the town.

Kutná Hora is located on the railway lines Prague–Brno and Kutná Hora-Zruč nad Sázavou. The town is served by four stations: Kutná Hora hlavní nádraží, Kutná Hora město, Kutná Hora předměstí and Kutná Hora-Sedlec.

== Sights ==
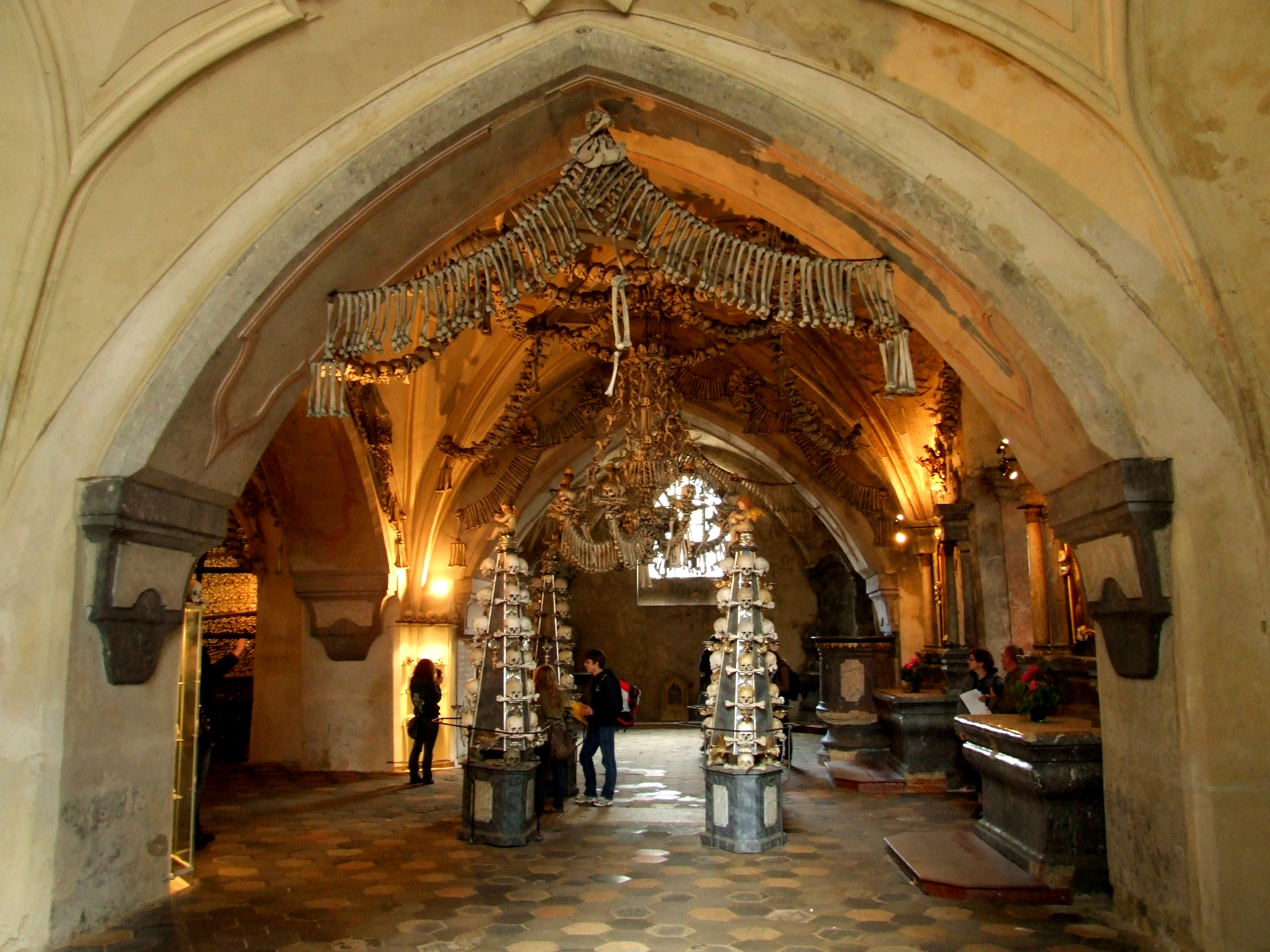
Interior of the Sedlec Ossuary

Since 1961, the historic town centre is protected as an urban monument reservation, the fourth largest in the Czech Republic with an area of 61 ha (150 acres). In 1995, the centre of Kutná Hora, including the Sedlec area, was designated a UNESCO World Heritage Site because of its outstanding architecture and its influence on subsequent architectural developments in other Central European city centres.

The most valuable monuments in the town centre, protected as national cultural monuments, are the Church of Saint Barbara and the Italian Court, but the historic town centre also includes more than 300 other cultural monuments. In 2023, the Sedlec area and the Church of Saint Barbara were visited by 290 and 250 thousand people respectively, making them one of the most important tourist destinations of the region and the 2nd and 3rd most visited sacral monuments in the Czech Republic (after Svatá Hora in Příbram). Since 2026, the Church of the Assumption of Our Lady and Saint John the Baptist in Sedlec and the Sedlec Ossuary have been also protected as national cultural monuments.

=== National cultural monuments in the historic town centre ===
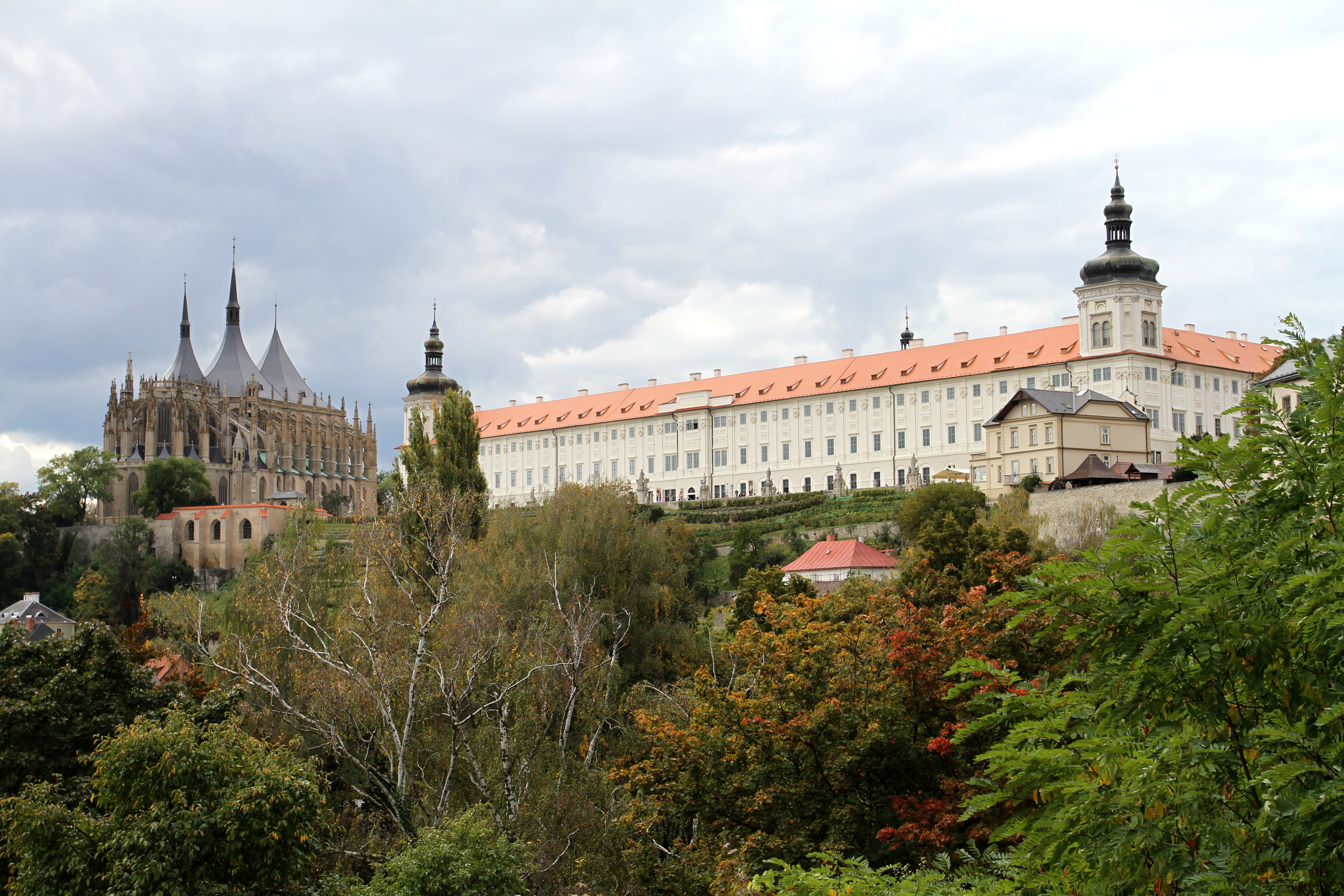
Church of Saint Barbara and Jesuit College

The Italian Court was built in the Gothic style between 1260 and 1300. It is the oldest monument in Kutná Hora. It was originally a part of the town's fortification system. In 1300, it became the seat of the royal mint, which was in operation until 1727. In the 1380s, another building was added, which served as a royal residence. The Italian Court is a complex of several buildings, the youngest of which were built in 1893–1898, when several dilapidated buildings were demolished and replaced under the leadership of the architect Ludvík Lábler, but the most valuable part of the complex was preserved. Of particular value and international distinction is the Chapel of Saints Wenceslaus and Ladislaus from around 1400.

The Church of Saint Barbara is among the main examples of European Gothic architecture. It was built in 1385–1395, on a site that was originally located outside the town walls, when there was already a chapel dedicated to St. Barbara. The cathedral was to represent the wealth of the town and was to compete with the nearby cathedral in Sedlec, as well as St. Vitus Cathedral in Prague. The construction project was created by Peter Parler and the construction was completed by Johann Parler. Architects and builders Master Hanuš, Matěj Rejsek and Benedikt Rejt participated in further construction stages in the 15th century. The purist reconstruction that took place from the 1880s until 1905 and was carried out by Josef Mocker and Ludvík Lábler is also considered valuable. The church complex includes a free-standing Chapel of Corpus Christi, originally a charnel house. It was also built in the Gothic style at the end of the 14th century.

=== Other monuments in the historic town centre ===
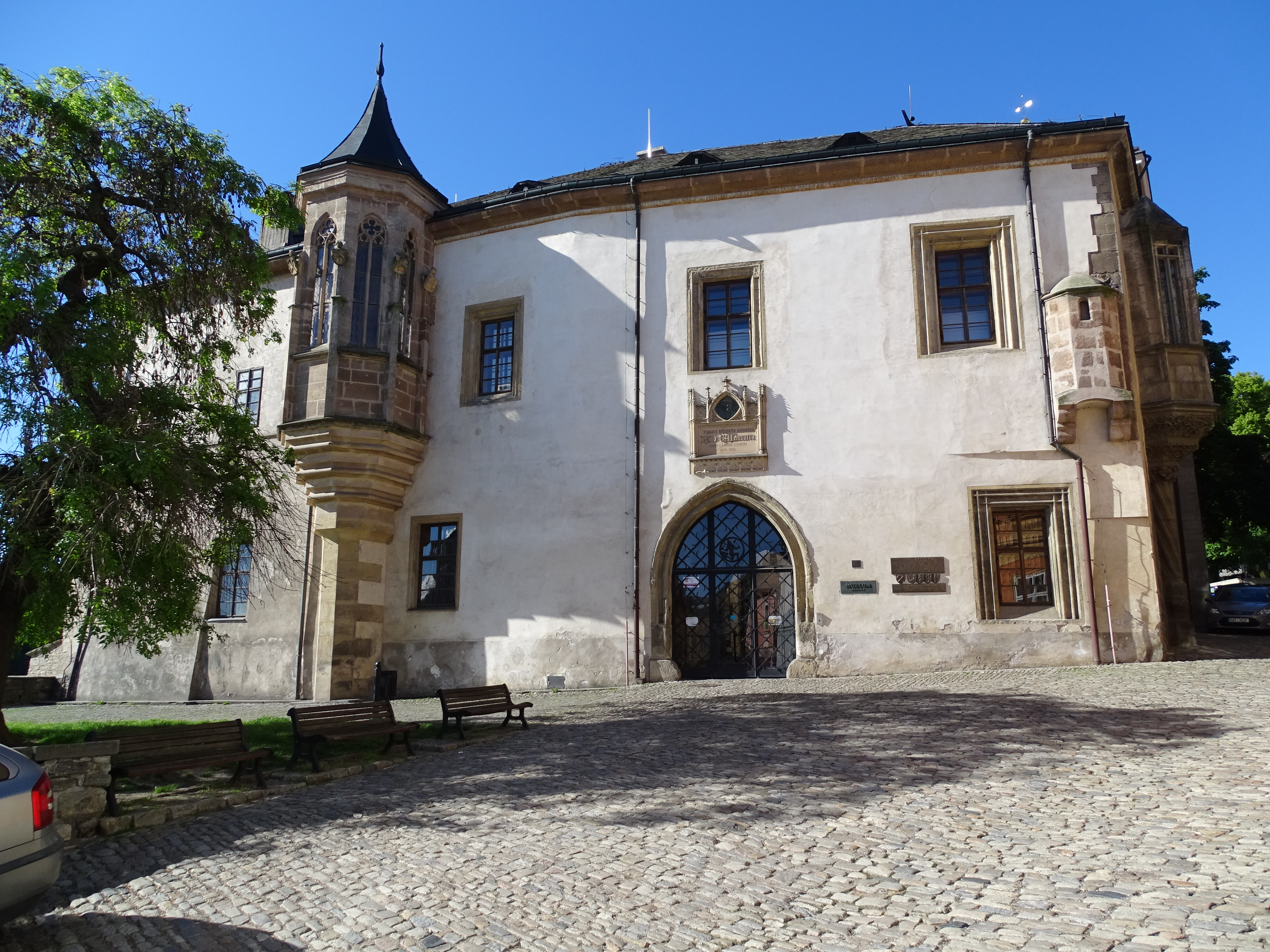
Hrádek – Museum of Silver

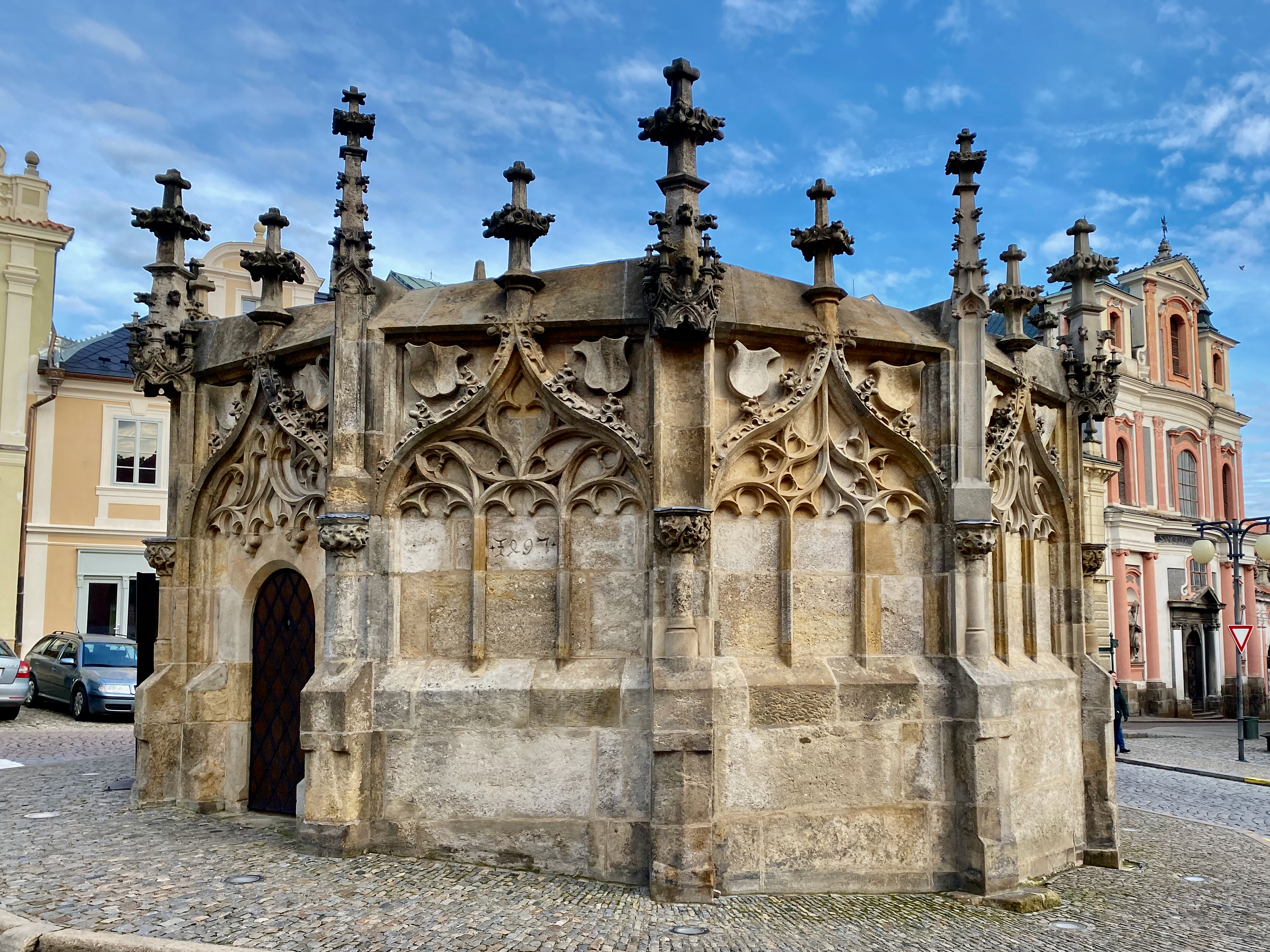
Stone Fountain; Church of Saint John of Nepomuk in the background

Next to the Church of Saint Barbara is the Jesuit College, also an important landmark of the town. It was designed by the architect Giovanni Domenico Orsi and the construction of this early Baroque building started in 1666. After Orsi's death in 1676, the construction was continued by Carlo Lurago. Construction continued throughout the 18th century, but was never completed to the planned extent. An important part of the complex is the promenade to the Church of St. Barbara with sculptural decoration by František Baugut.

The so-called Stone House (Czech: Kamenný dům) is a late Gothic burgher house from the 1480s. Since 1902, it houses the Museum of Silver.

Hrádek was originally a wooden fortress from 1312, rebuilt into a small castle in 1400–1420 and then completely rebuilt into a palace at the turn of the 15th and 16th centuries. A Jesuit seminary was established in its premises in 1686. It was used by the Jesuits until the abolishment of the order in 1773. From 1910, it was owned by the Kutná Hora town. Since 1947, it has been used by the Museum of Silver.

A notable technical monument is a dodecagon-shaped stone fountain, situated on today's square Rejskovo náměstí. It was probably created by Matěj Rejsek and is sometimes called Rejsek's Fountain. From its construction in 1495 until 1663, it served as a drinking water reservoir. It solved the absence of water sources that were disrupted by mining activities. The late Gothic fountain is unique not only in its dimensions, but also in the material used, which was not common in other fountains in the town.

The plague column in Kutná Hora was created by the Jesuit sculptor František Baugut in 1714–1715. It is a sculturally valuable Baroque work, created as a pieta for those who died during the plague epidemic in 1713. The top of the column is decorated by the statue of the Virgin Mary Immaculate. The pedestal is decorated by statues of saints and miners, typical for Kutná Hora.

==== Churches ====
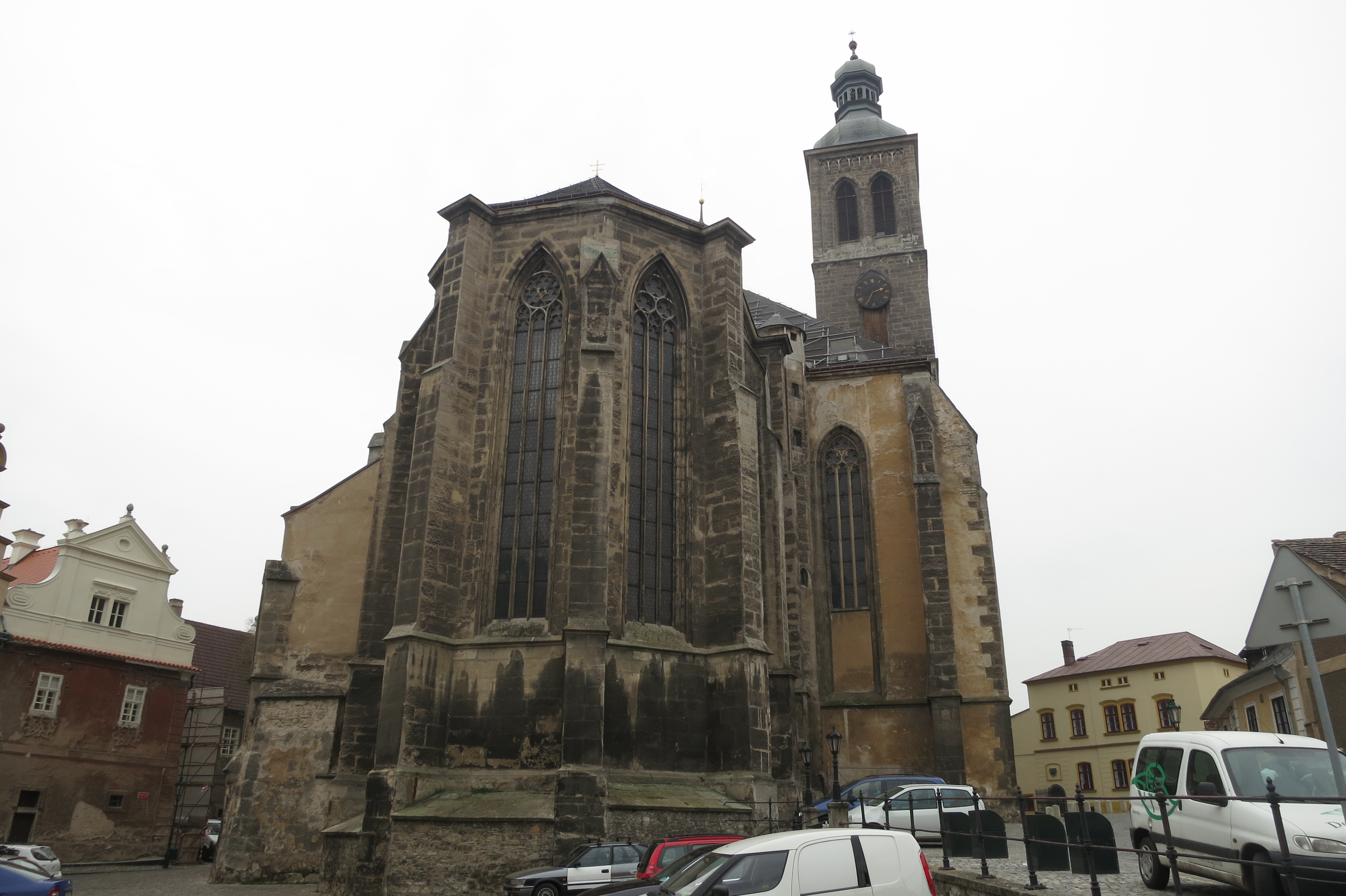
Church of Saint James the Great

A prominent building is the Church of Saint James the Great, located next to the Italian Court. It was built in the Gothic style in 1300–1370 and modified during the reconstructions at the end of the 19th century and in 1941–1946. It is a monumental church with an 80.5 m (264 ft) high tower.

The Church of Saint John of Nepomuk was built in the Baroque style in 1734–1752, on the site of houses that was destroyed by the 1730 fire. It was built according to the design by František Maxmilián Kaňka, but other important artists of the Baroque era also participated in its creation. Today it serves mainly for cultural purposes.

The Church of Our Lady "Na Náměti" is a late Gothic building with neo-Gothic modifications. The oldest part of the church dates from the beginning of the 14th century. The church was damaged by fires in 1770 and 1823, but the late Gothic style still prevails today.

In 1712, the Ursulines arrived to Kutná Hora. The Ursuline Convent was built in the Baroque style in 1738–1743 according to the design by Kilian Ignaz Dientzenhofer, but only three wings were completed. Next to the convent is the neo-Baroque Church of the Sacred Heart, designed by Friedrich Ohmann and built in 1897–1901. Today, part of the convent is used as a school, part is used by the National Heritage Institute, and part has been returned to the order. The cellars are used commercially as wine cellars.

=== Sedlec ===
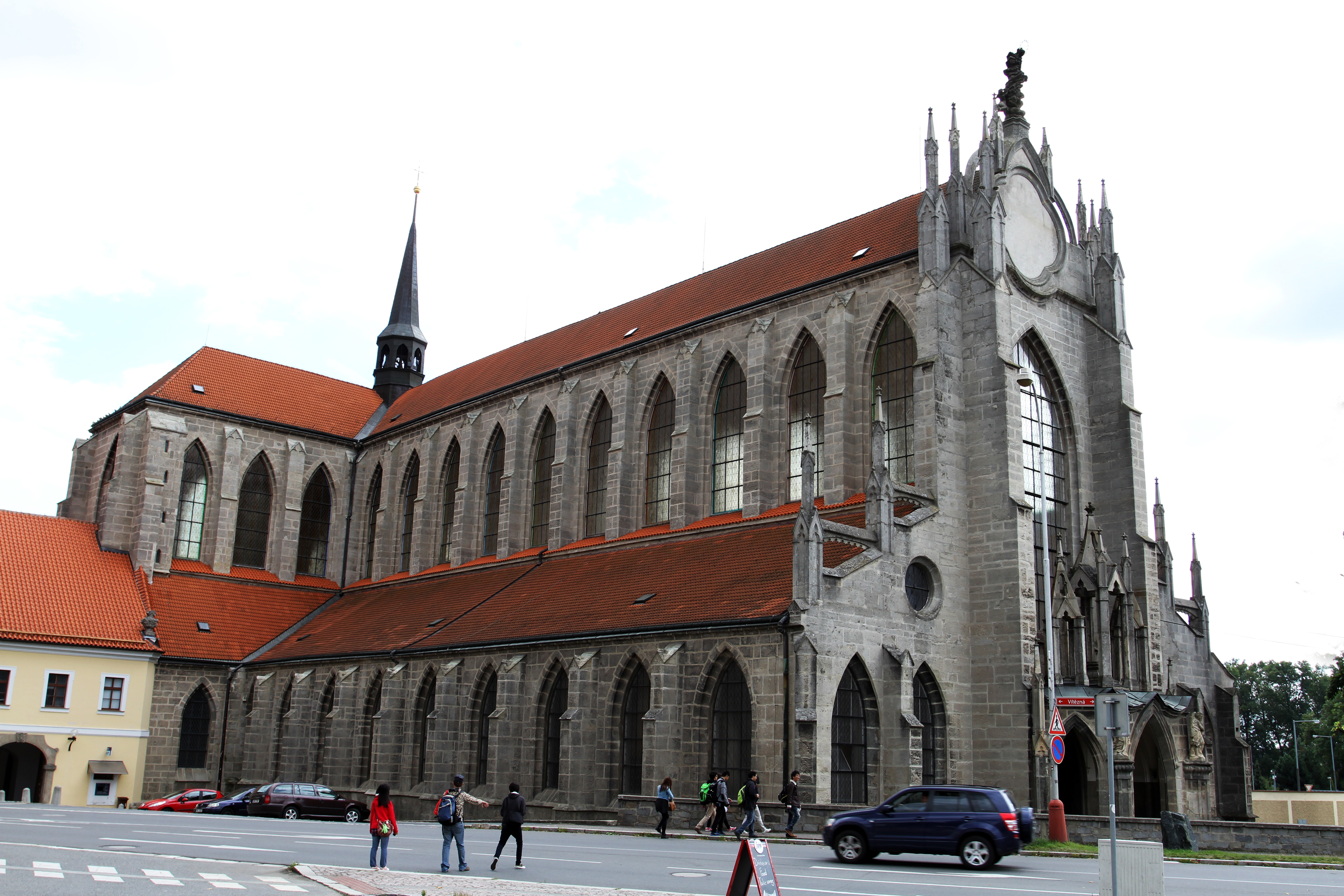
Church of the Assumption of Our Lady and Saint John the Baptist

The Sedlec suburb of Kutná Hora is known for the Sedlec Abbey with the Church of the Assumption of Our Lady and Saint John the Baptist. Founded in 1142, the monastery was founded in 1142, but most of the monastery complex was built in the second half of the 13th century. The large complex had an area of 20 ha (49 acres) at its peak and belonged to the largest and wealthiest monasteries of the Czech lands in the Middle Ages. At the turn of the 17th and 18th centuries, the church acquired a unique Baroque-Gothic form according to the design of the architect Jan Santini Aichel.

Near the abbey is the Church of All Saints, known for the Sedlec Ossuary. The ossuary was a cemetery chapel, built at the end of the 14th century and modified in the Baroque style at the beginning of the 18th century by Jan Santini Aichel. It is estimated that the ossuary is decorated with bones of more than 40,000 skeletons that belonged to those who died from plague epidemics and the Hussite Wars. The unique decoration, the main element of which is a chandelier composed of all the large bones of the human body, was created by the carver František Rint. The cemetery around the church was used in the 13th–16th centuries. Today it is an archaeological site where 30 mass graves have been identified.

=== Malín ===
The village of Malín used to be a site of an early medieval gord. The main landmark of Malín is the Church of Saint Stephen. Originally a Romanesque building, it was rebuilt in the Gothic style in the 14th and 15th centuries. In 1710, it was rebuilt into its current Baroque form. Next to the church is a separate wooden bell tower from the end of the 15th century.

== Notable people ==
- Bohuslav Bílejovský (c. 1480 – 1555), historian and theologian
- Jakob Jakobeus (1591–1645), Slovak writer
- Václav Bernard Ambrosi (1723–1806), painter
- Jan Erazim Vocel (1803–1871), poet, archaeologist and historian
- Josef Kajetán Tyl (1808–1856), dramatist and writer, author of the national anthem
- Antonín Lhota (1812–1905), painter and art teacher
- Felix Jenewein (1857–1905), painter and illustrator
- Gabriela Preissová (1862–1946), writer and playwright
- Emanuel Viktor Voska (1875–1960), intelligence agency officer
- Karel Domin (1882–1953), botanist and politician
- Jaroslav Vojta (1888–1970), actor
- Vera Prasilova Scott (1899–1996), Czech-American photographer and sculptor
- František Zelenka (1904–1944), architect, graphic, stage set and costume designer
- Jiří Orten (1919–1941), poet
- Zbyněk Zbyslav Stránský (1926–2016), museologist
- Radka Denemarková (born 1968), writer and translator
- Alena Polenská (born 1990), ice hockey player

== Twin towns – sister cities ==
Kutná Hora is twinned with:

- Bingen am Rhein, Germany
- Eger, Hungary
- Fidenza, Italy
- Jajce, Bosnia and Herzegovina
- Kamianets-Podilskyi, Ukraine
- Kremnica, Slovakia
- Reims, France
- Ringsted, Denmark
- Stamford, United Kingdom
- Tarnowskie Góry, Poland

== In popular culture ==
A recreation of the town as it existed in 1403 is prominently featured in the Czech role-playing game Kingdom Come: Deliverance II.

== Gallery ==
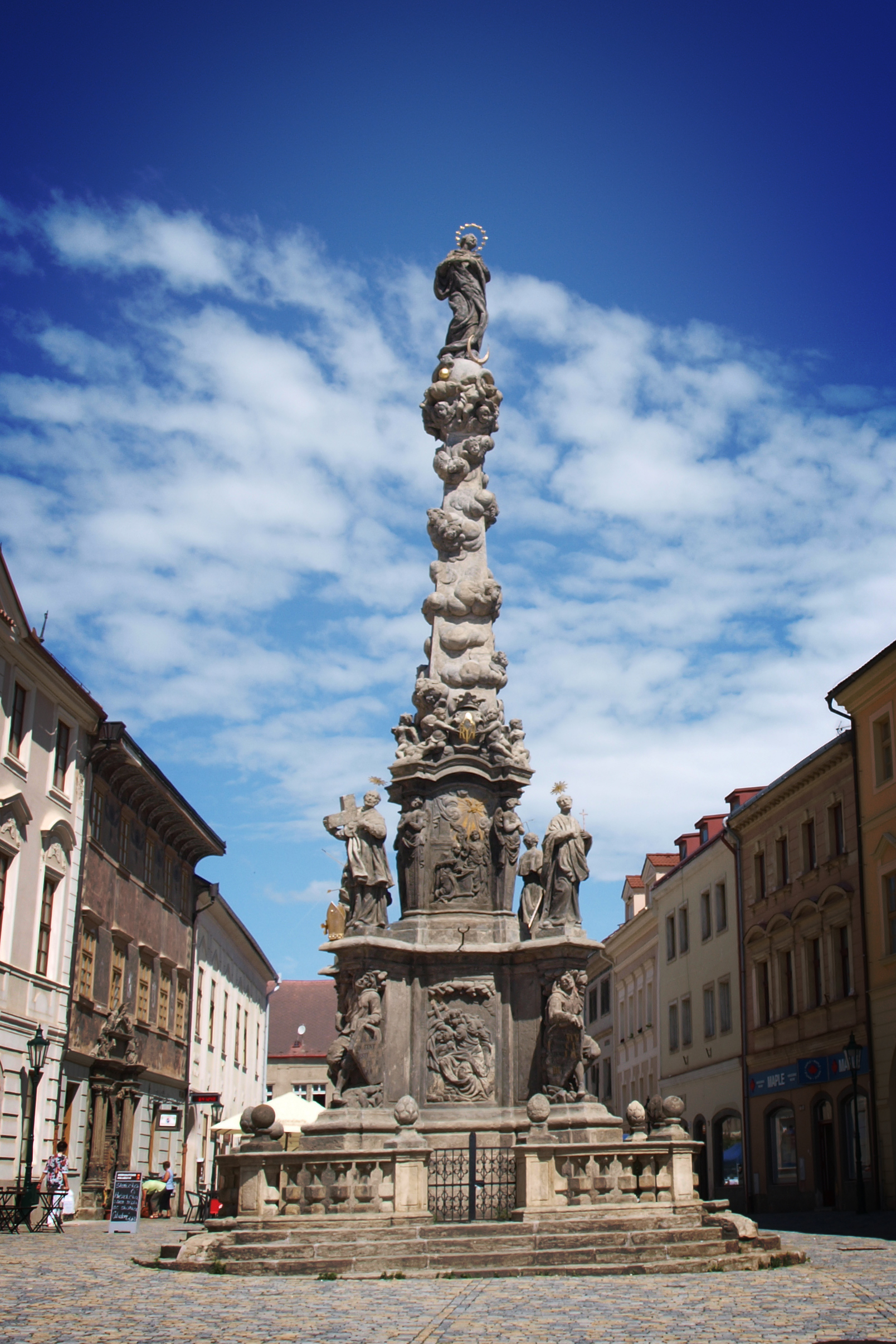
Plague column

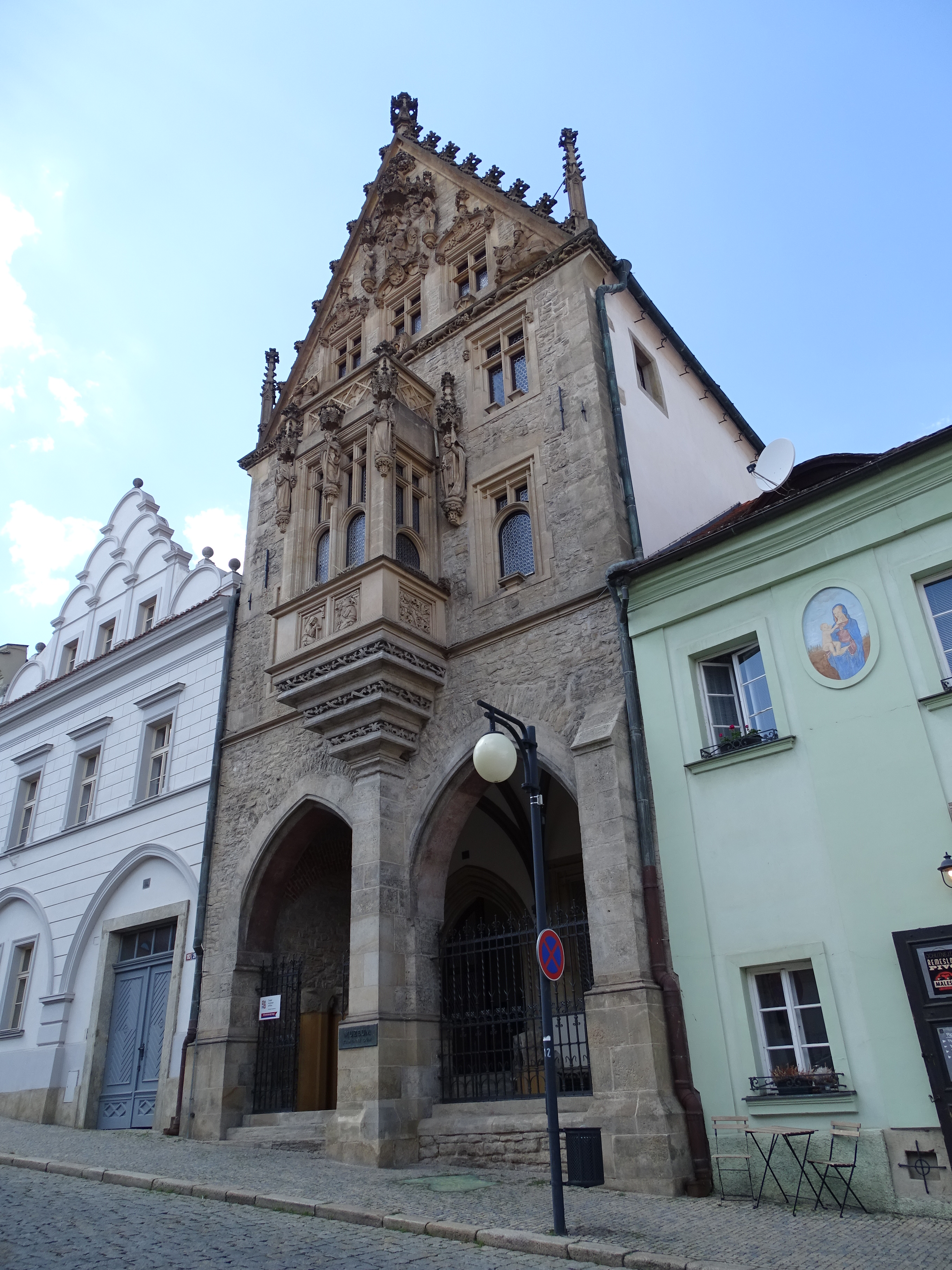
Stone House – Museum of Silver

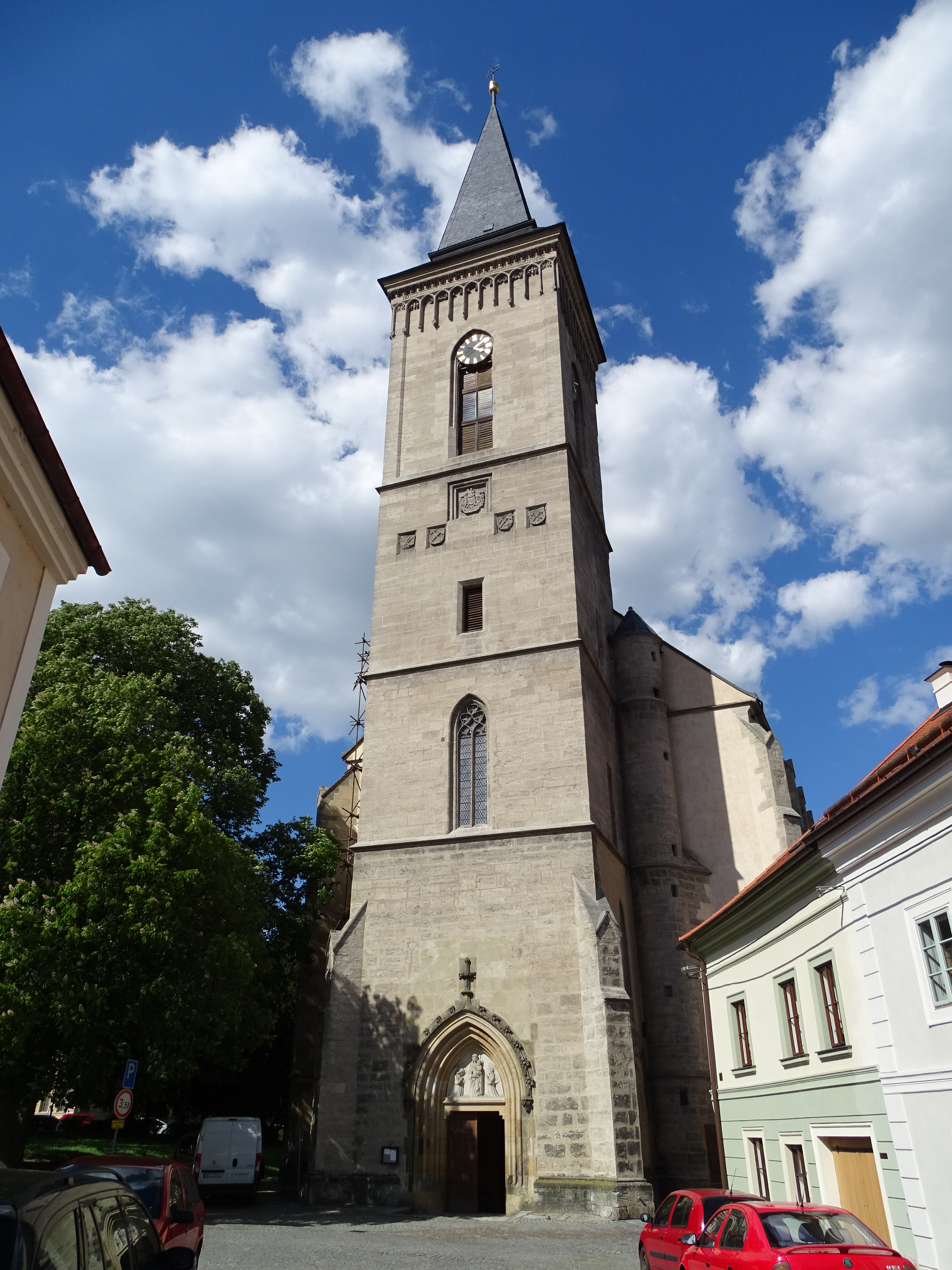
Church of Our Lady "Na Náměti"

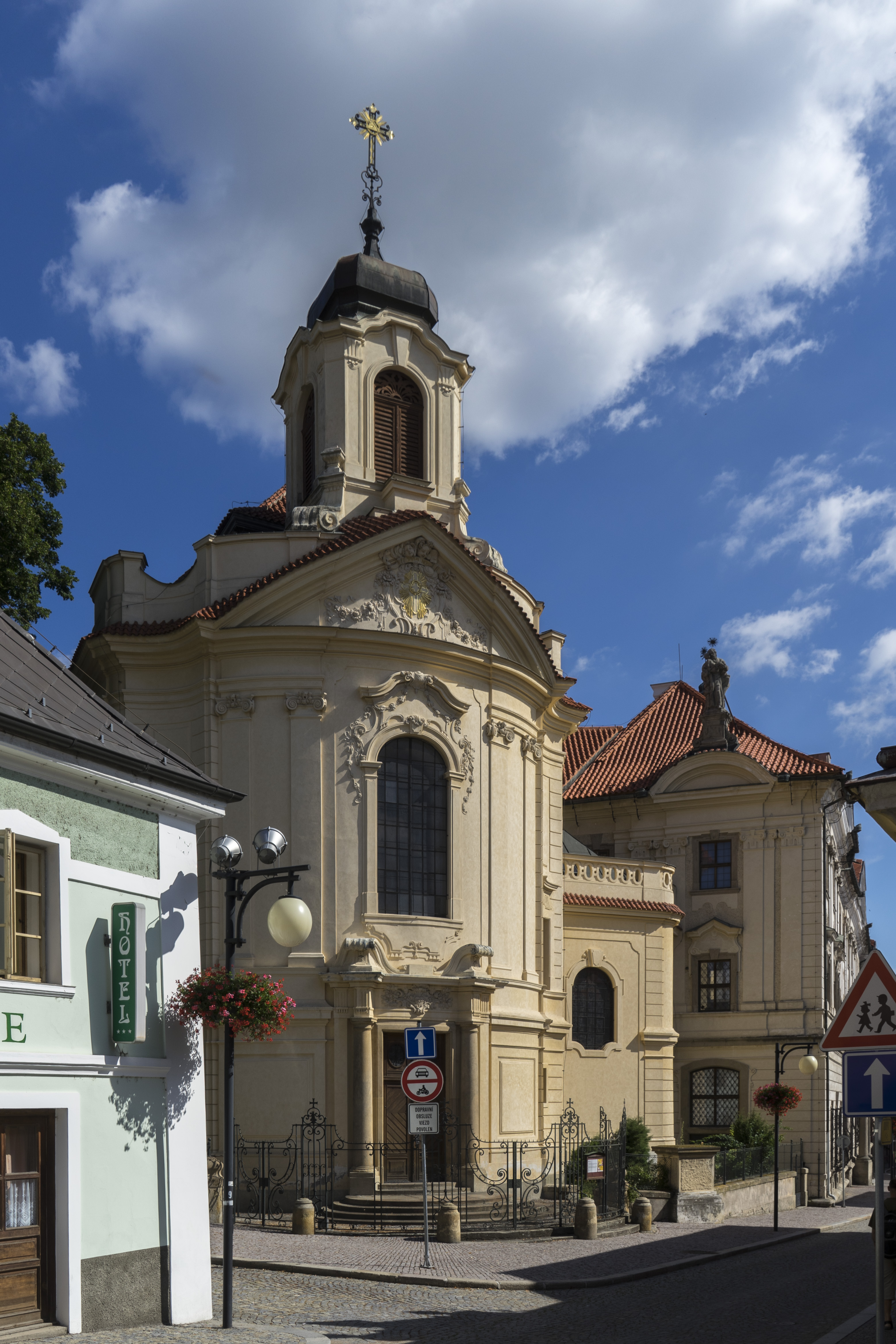
Church of the Sacred Heart

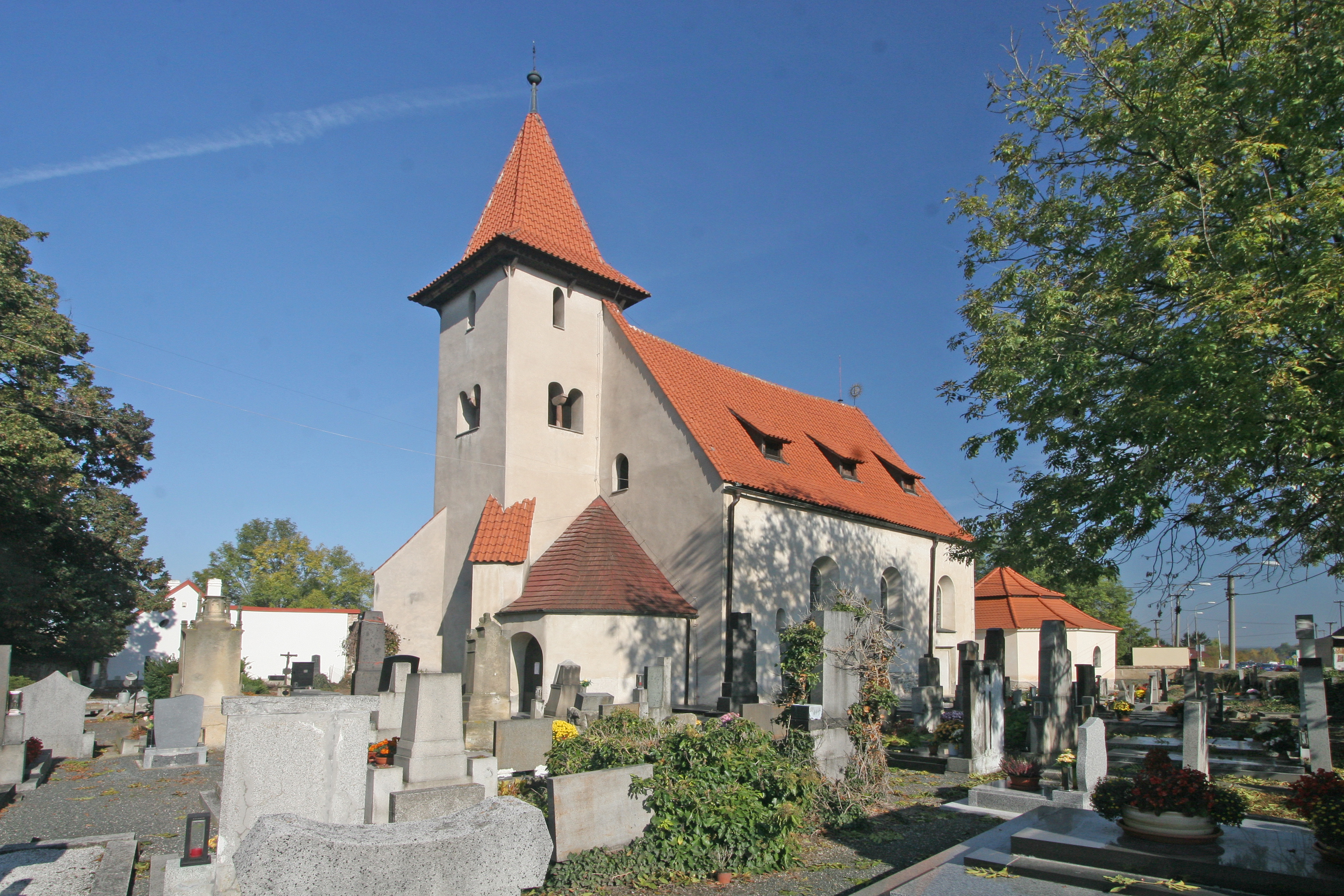
Church of Saint Stephen in Malín

== See also ==
- Jáchymov, another Bohemian silver mining town
