= Emanuel Viktor Voska =

U.S. intelligence agency officer (1875–1960)

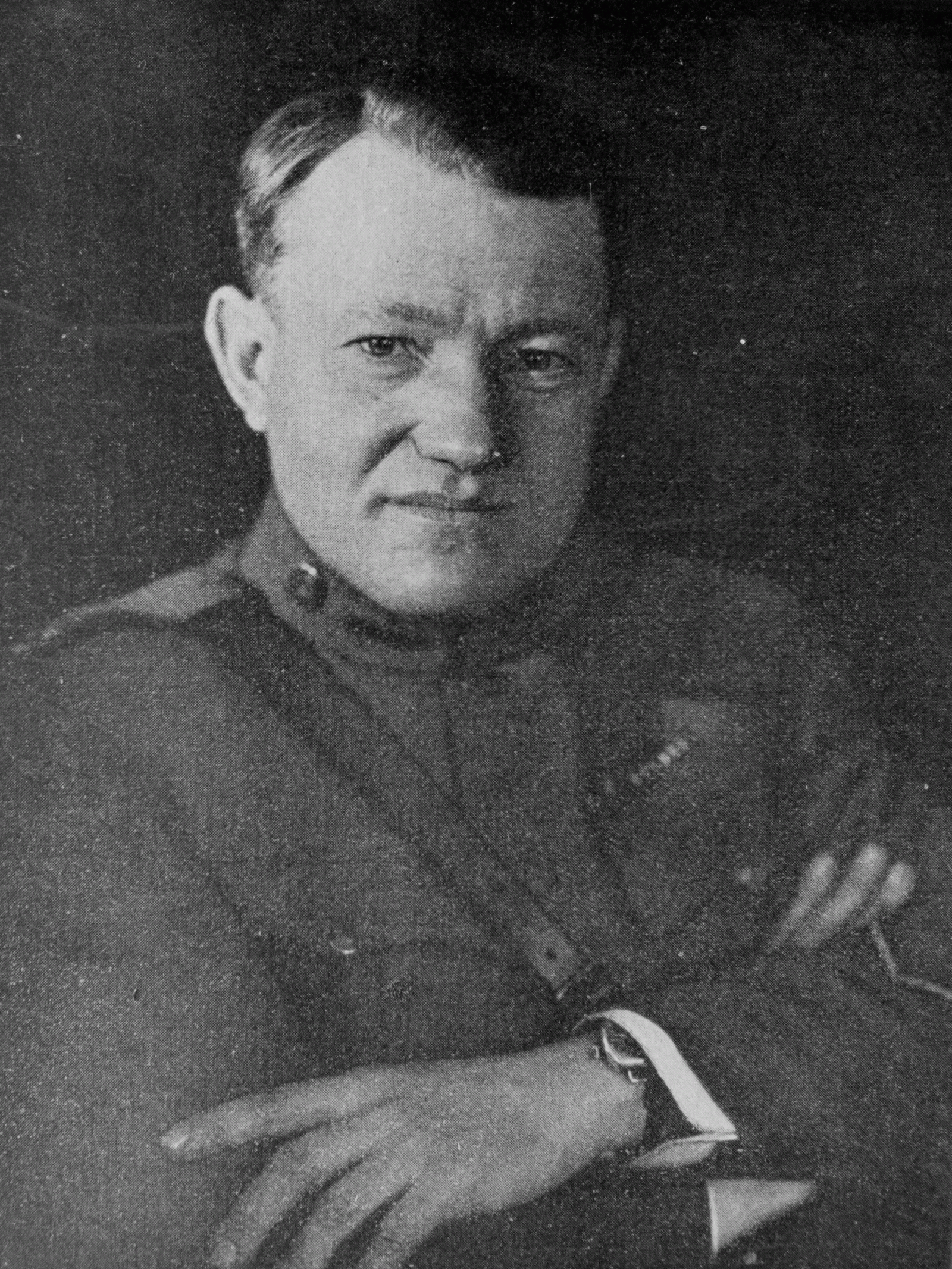
Emanuel Viktor Voska (before 1921)

Emanuel Viktor Voska (1875 in Kutná Hora, Bohemia – April 1, 1960 in Ruzyně prison in Prague, Czechoslovakia) was an U.S. intelligence agency officer in World War I and World War II.

Before and during World War I he worked extensively with Tomáš Garrigue Masaryk (1850–1937), first President of the Czechoslovakia. His intelligence activities are credited with the exposure of the Hindu–German Conspiracy. In 1917, Voska was one of four Czech patriots who traveled to Petrograd with the British author Somerset Maugham, who was then working as a British intelligence agent, on a secret mission with the objectives of propping up the Provisional Government in Russia and preventing them from concluding a unilateral peace treaty with Germany. Voska was also instrumental in preventing the efforts of German agent Franz von Rintelen to restore Victoriano Huerta to the Mexican presidency during World War I.
