= Sedlec Abbey =

- Sedlecký klášter
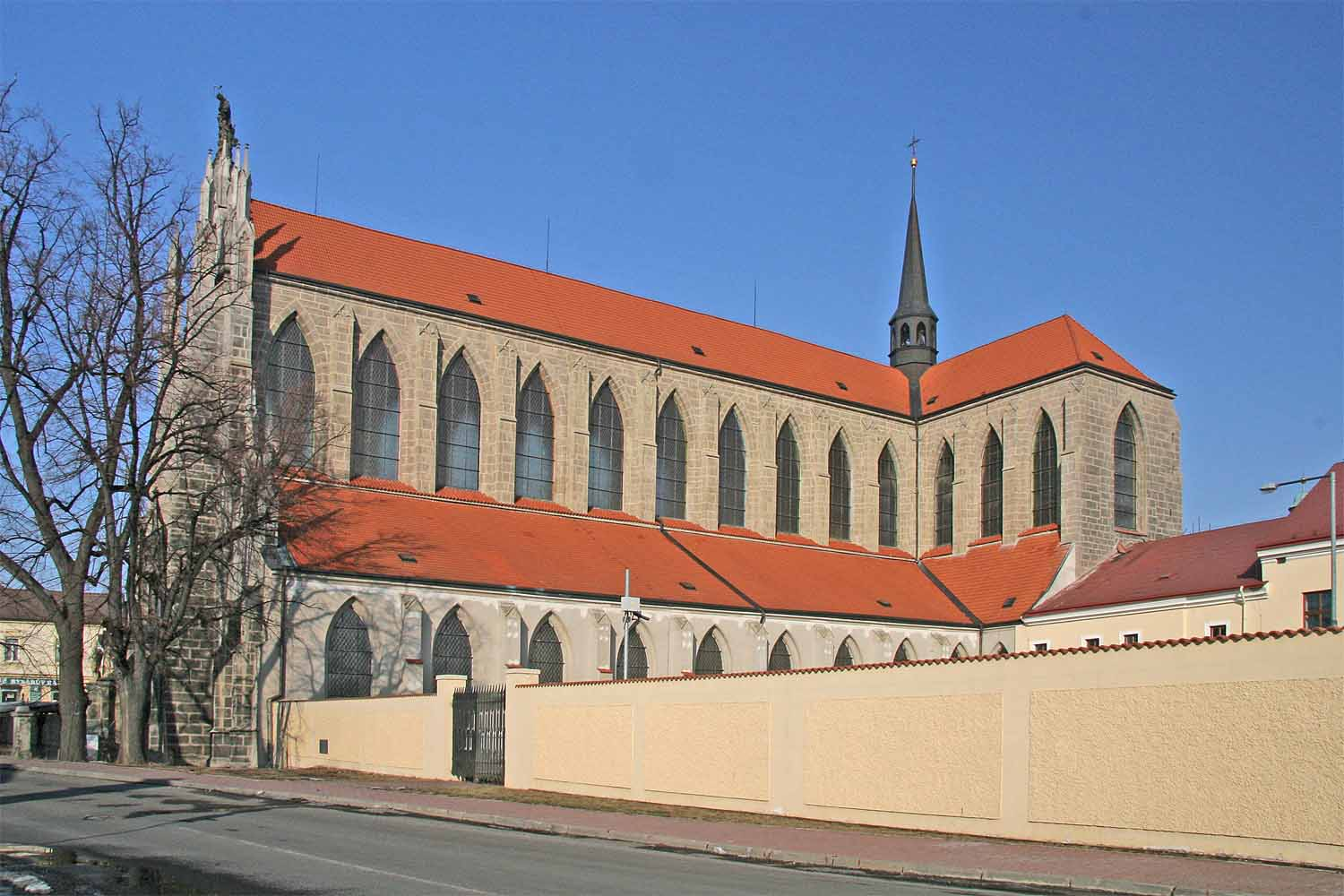
- Abbey church
- Sedlec Abbey
- 49°57′35.43″N 15°17′23.56″E
- Location: Kutná Hora, Czech Republic
- Denomination: Catholic

History
- Status: Former Cistercian monastery

Architecture
- Style: Gothic
- Groundbreaking: 1142

UNESCO World Heritage Site
- Type: Cultural
- Designated: 1995
- Region: Europe and North America

Sedlec Abbey (Czech: Sedlecký klášter) is a former Cistercian monastery in Sedlec, part of Kutná Hora in the Czech Republic. Founded in 1142, it was the first Cistercian foundation in Bohemia. Along with the rest of the Kutná Hora town centre, it was listed as a UNESCO World Heritage Site in 1995, because of its outstanding Baroque architecture. It is well known for housing the Sedlec Ossuary.

== History ==
Sedlec Abbey was founded in 1142 from Waldsassen Abbey in Sedlec as the first Cistercian monastery in Bohemia. The grounds covered by wood and swamp were granted by Miroslav, House of Vartenberk. It flourished under abbot Heinrich Heidenreich, due to silver mining in the region.

The abbey was burnt in April 1421 by Hussites led by Jan Žižka, and many monks were killed. The library had been secured shortly before to the Stift Klosterneuburg in Lower Austria. A few monks returned, but it took until 1620 to revive the monastery. It flourished once more after the Thirty Years' War, when several buildings were erected or remodeled. The abbey was dissolved in 1783.

== Buildings ==
The abbey was originally built in the Romanesque style. It was remodeled in the Gothic style between 1280 and 1320. After their destruction by the Hussites, the buildings were reconstructed at the beginning of the 18th century.

The abbey church was dedicated to the Assumption of Mary and Saint John the Baptist. It was built as a basilica with five naves between 1280 and 1330. Destroyed in 1421, it was rebuilt from 1699 to 1707 after designs by Paul Ignaz Bayer and Jan Santini Aichel. Another restoration, trying to preserve the original appearance, was performed from 1854 to 1857.

The Chapel of All Saints, next to the cemetery, was run from 1389 by a Brotherhood of the Holy Sepulchre. The building, dating from around 1400, was rebuilt several times and remodeled in the Baroque style in 1710 by Santini Aichel. It holds in its basement the Sedlec Ossuary.

== Gallery ==
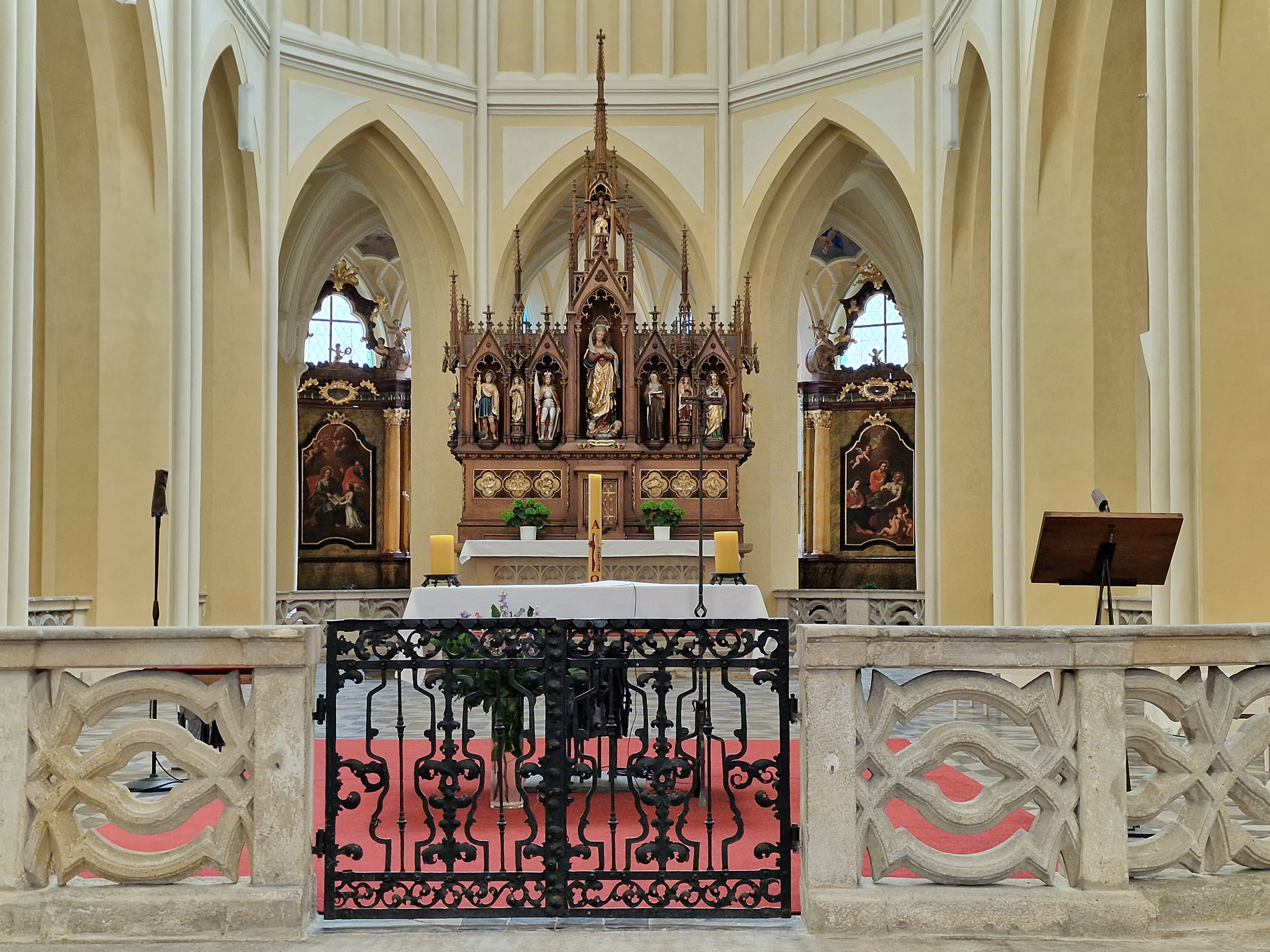
Main altar

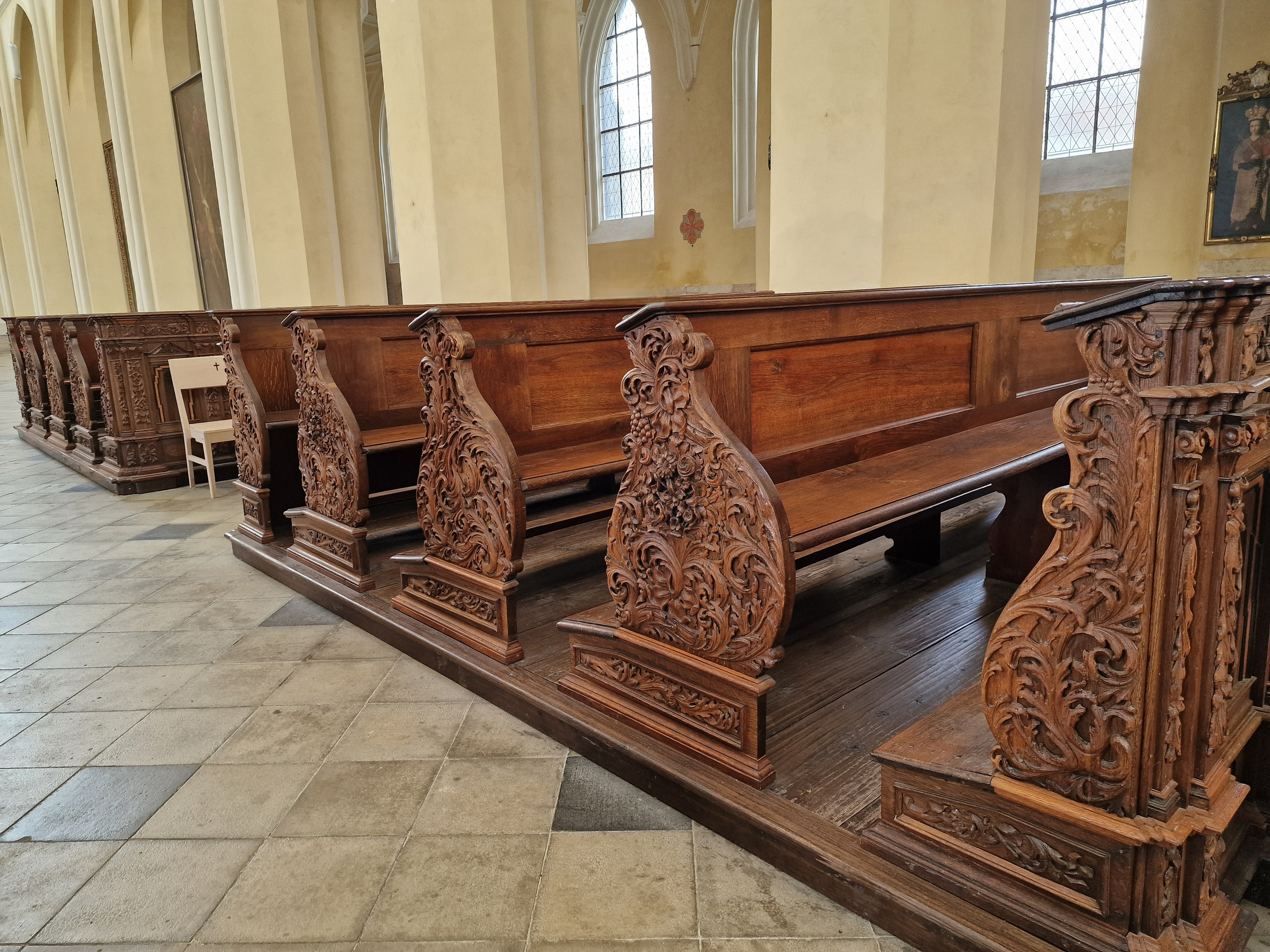
Pews

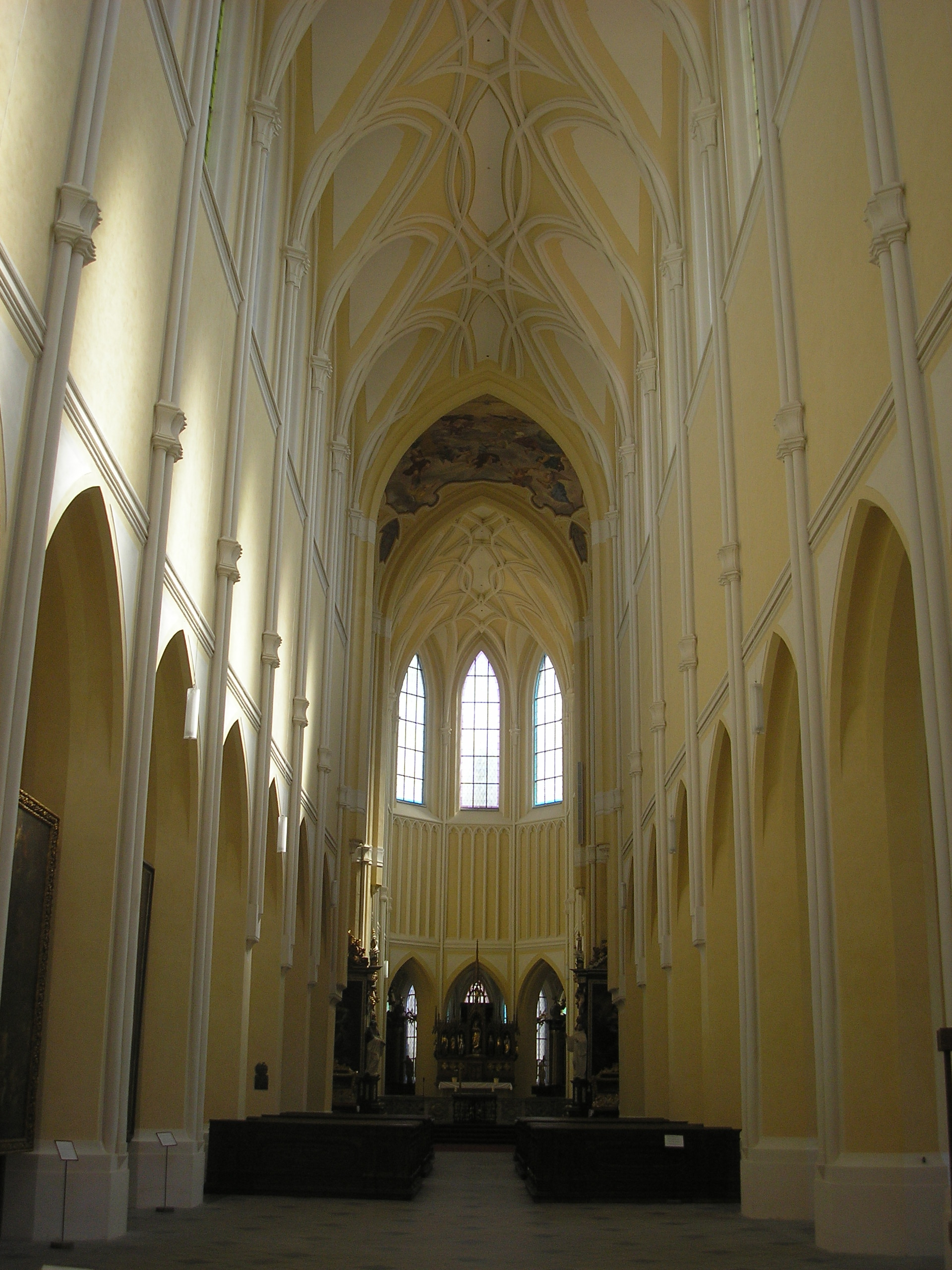
Nave of the abbey church

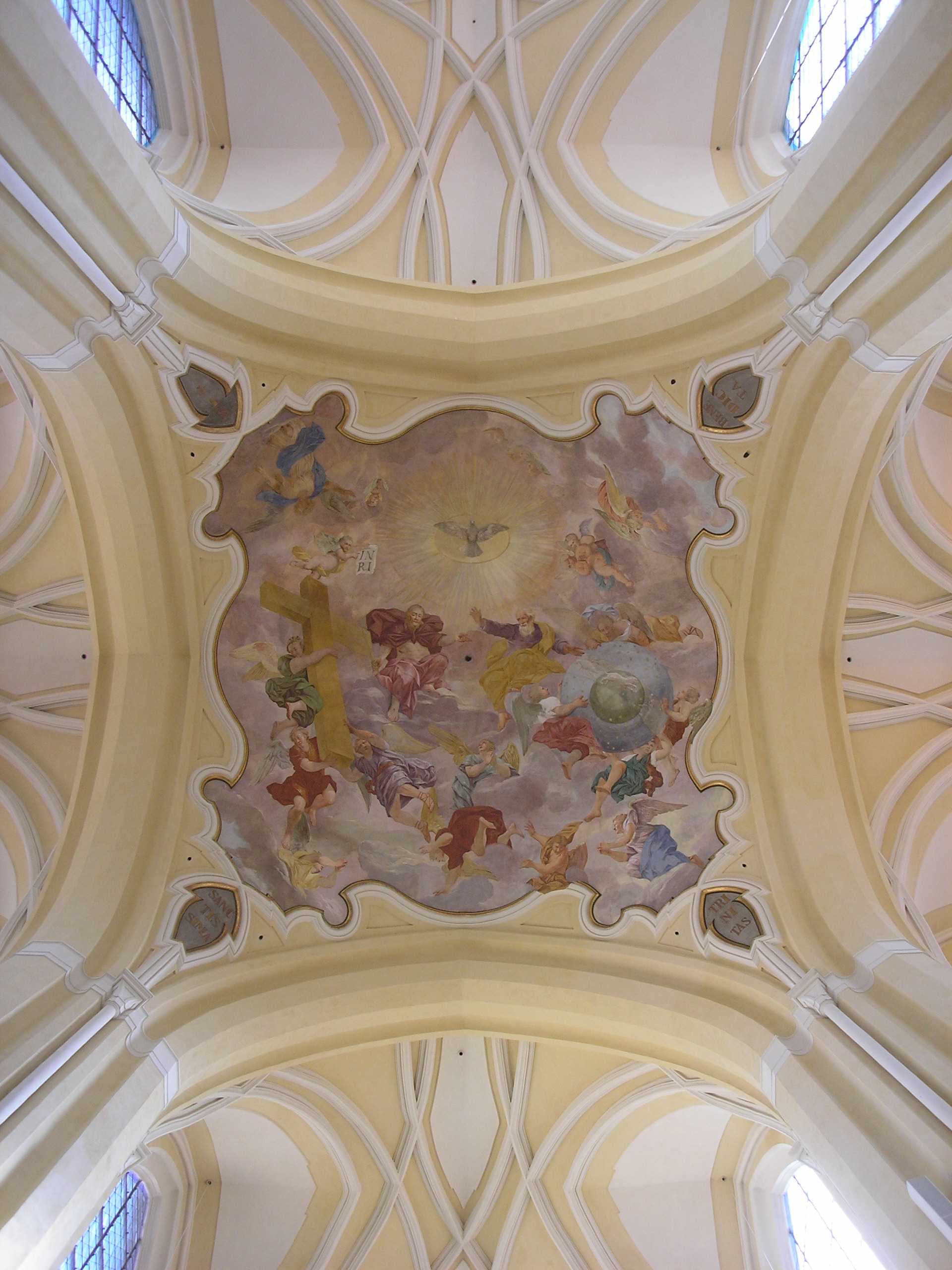
Vault

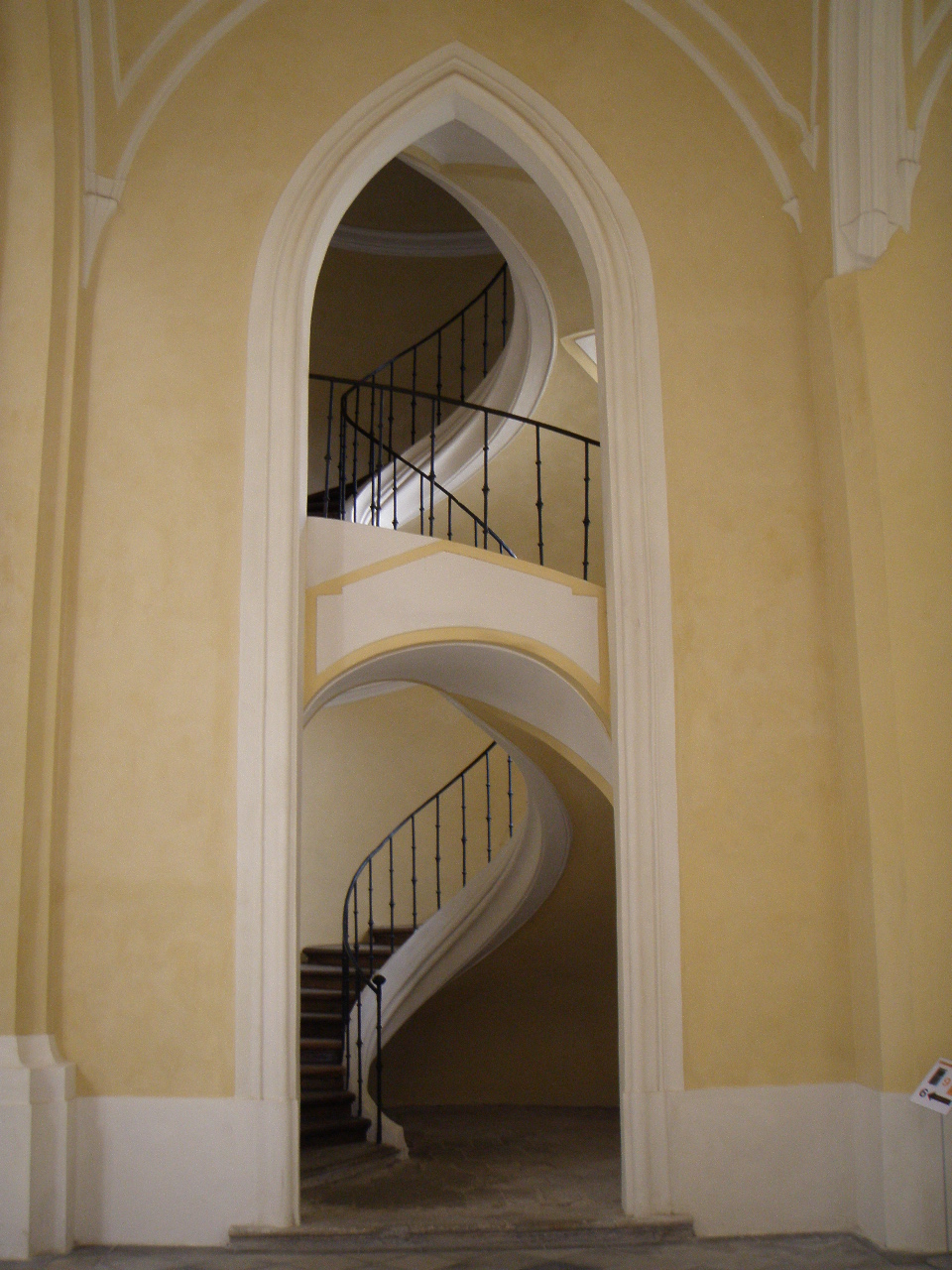
Stairs

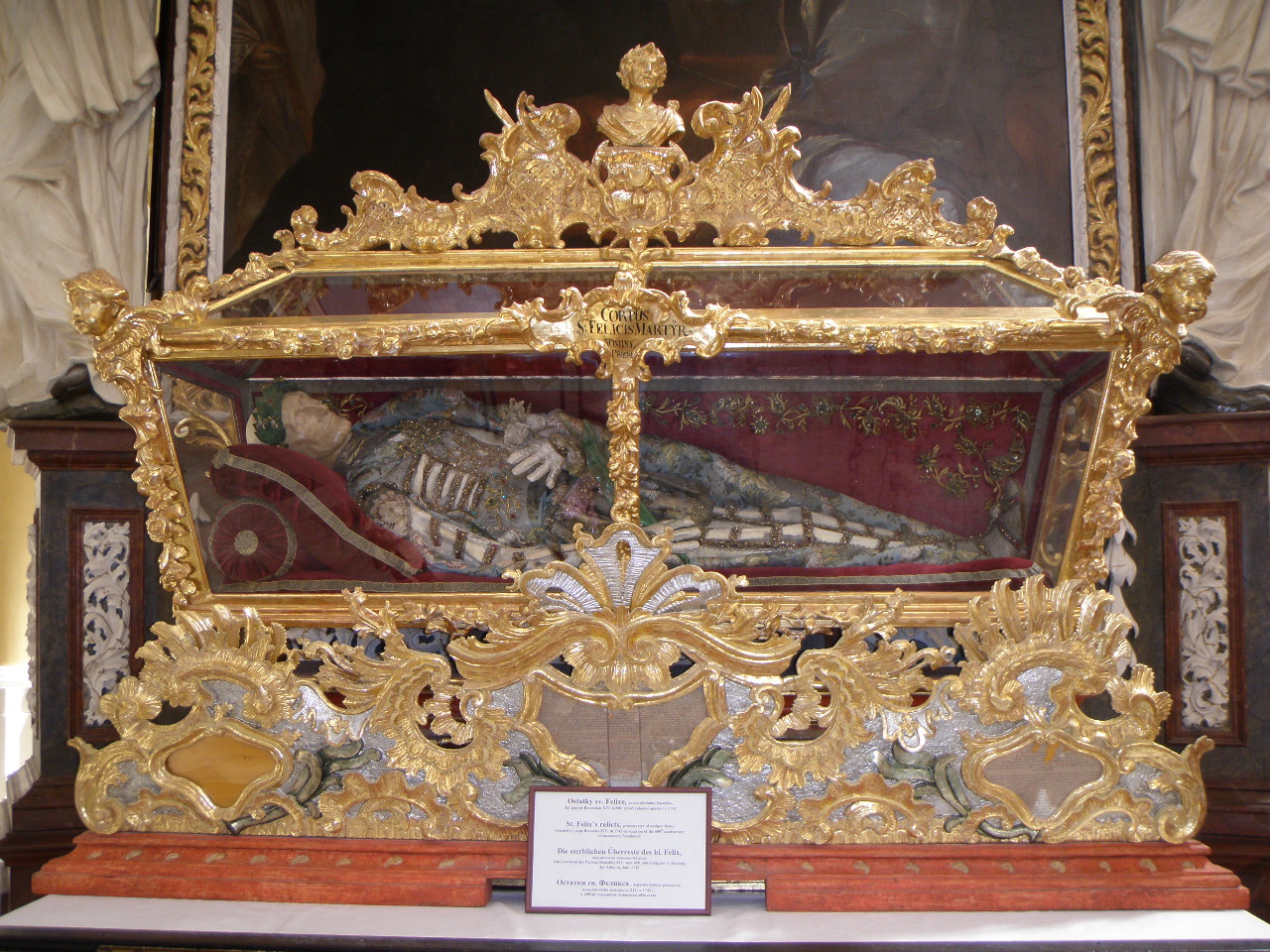
Relic of St. Felix

== Literature ==
- Štěpán Vácha: Antiquitatis illustre monimentum. Die Restaurierung der Klosterkirche in Sedletz in den Jahren 1700–1709, Umění 56 (2008), pp. 384–408
- Joachim Bahlcke, Winfried Eberhard, Miloslav Polívka: Handbuch der historischen Stätten. Böhmen und Mähren, Stuttgart 1998, ISBN 3-520-32901-8, pp. 564–565
- Jiři Kuthan: Die mittelalterliche Baukunst der Zisterzienser in Böhmen und Mähren, München und Berlin 1982: Deutscher Kunstverlag, ISBN 3-422-00738-5, pp. 145–163
- Kateřina Charvátová, Dobroslav Líbal: Sedlec. In: D. Housková, D. (ed.): Řád cisterciáků v českých zemích ve středověku. Sborník vydaný k 850. výročí založení kláštera v Plasech. Unicornis, Praha 1994, ISBN 80-901587-1-4, pp. 38–43
