= 1420 =

1420 in various calendars
- Gregorian calendar: 1420; MCDXX
- Ab urbe condita: 2173
- Armenian calendar: 869; ԹՎ ՊԿԹ
- Assyrian calendar: 6170
- Balinese saka calendar: 1341–1342
- Bengali calendar: 826–827
- Berber calendar: 2370
- English Regnal year: 7 Hen. 5 – 8 Hen. 5
- Buddhist calendar: 1964
- Burmese calendar: 782
- Byzantine calendar: 6928–6929
- Chinese calendar: 己亥年 (Earth Pig); 4117 or 3910 — to — 庚子年 (Metal Rat); 4118 or 3911
- Coptic calendar: 1136–1137
- Discordian calendar: 2586
- Ethiopian calendar: 1412–1413
- Hebrew calendar: 5180–5181
- Hindu calendars
- Vikram Samvat: 1476–1477
- Shaka Samvat: 1341–1342
- Kali Yuga: 4520–4521
- Holocene calendar: 11420
- Igbo calendar: 420–421
- Iranian calendar: 798–799
- Islamic calendar: 822–823
- Japanese calendar: Ōei 27 (応永２７年)
- Javanese calendar: 1334–1335
- Julian calendar: 1420; MCDXX
- Korean calendar: 3753
- Minguo calendar: 492 before ROC 民前492年
- Nanakshahi calendar: −48
- Thai solar calendar: 1962–1963
- Tibetan calendar: ས་མོ་ཕག་ལོ་ (female Earth-Boar); 1546 or 1165 or 393 — to — ལྕགས་ཕོ་བྱི་བ་ལོ་ (male Iron-Rat); 1547 or 1166 or 394

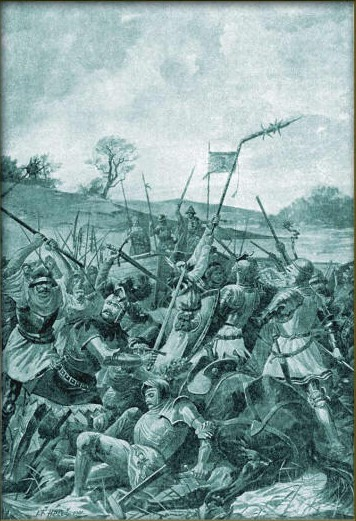
March 25: The Hussites defeat Holy Roman Empire troops at the Battle of Sudomer.

Year 1420 (MCDXX) was a leap year starting on Monday of the Julian calendar.

== Events ==
=== January–March ===
- January 25 – The civil war in Switzerland, which has pitted the cantons of Lucerne, Uri and Unterwalden, supporting rebels in Valais against the Baron of Valais and against the Canton of Bern, is ended by the signing of a treaty at the neutral town of Zug, after mediation by Amadeus VIII, Duke of Savoy.
- February 8 – Admiral Pietro Loredan of the Republic of Venice is assigned to carry out the conquest of Dalmatia (later part of Croatia) across the Adriatic Sea.
- February 14 – English Lollard William Taylor is acquitted of charges of heresy in a trial before the Archbishop of Canterbury, Henry Chichele. Taylor will in 1423 be convicted of heresy and burned at the stake.
- March 1 – Pope Martin V issues the papal bull Omnium plasmatoris domini, calling upon Roman Catholics to unite in a crusade against what he considers heretic Christian sects, including the adherents of John Wycliffe (Lollards) and the followers of Jan Hus (Hussites).
- March 15 – Sigismund, Holy Roman Emperor, orders the execution of the Hussite Jan Krása, who had led an uprising against the Empire at Wroclaw.
- March 17 – Ferdinand de Palacios, an envoy of the Pope, publishes the papal bull at Wroclaw, calling for a crusade against the Hussites.
- March 25 – Hussite Wars: After their offer of a surrender is refused, the outnumbered Hussites of Bohemia, led by Jan Zizka, defeat the invading Holy Roman Imperial forces at the Battle of Sudoměř fought near modern-day Čejetice in the Czech Republic.
- March 26 – Frederick I, Elector of Brandenburg leads a decisive defeat of the Pomeranian Alliance in the battle of Angermünde.

=== April–June ===
- April 22 – A dispute between the County of Nassau-Siegen and the Electorate of Trier over who shall be made count of Isenburg-Limburg is settled after negotiations.
- April 30 – Great Frisian War: In a war that began 70 years earlier in 1350 The Skieringers, led by Sikke Sjaarda, capture the city of Bolsward (part of Friesland in the modern Netherlands) from the wealthier Fetkeapers. The allies of the Fetkeapers, led by Focko Ukena, then react and make a counterattack on May 12 at Palesloot near Hindeloopen.
- May 12 – Naval and military forces of the Republic of Venice, led by Admiral Loredan, begin their assault on the territory of Dalamatia in order to control the Adriatic. By October, the area is under Venetian control.
- May 21 – Treaty of Troyes: With the Burgundian faction dominant in France, King Charles VI of France acknowledges Henry V of England as his heir, and as virtual ruler of most of France.
- May 23 – Albert V, Duke of Austria, issues the Vienna Gesera, a campaign of expulsion or extermination of the 1,500 Jewish residents of Vienna. Those who are not imprisoned are executed 10 months later, and similar persecutions are carried out in other cities in Austria.
- May 25 – Prince Henry the Navigator is appointed Grand Master of the Military Order of Christ.
- June 2 – Catherine of Valois (daughter of Charles VI of France) is married to King Henry V of England.
- June 7 – Troops of the Republic of Venice capture Udine after a long siege, ending the independence of the Patriarchal State of Friuli, run by the Patriarch of Aquileia.

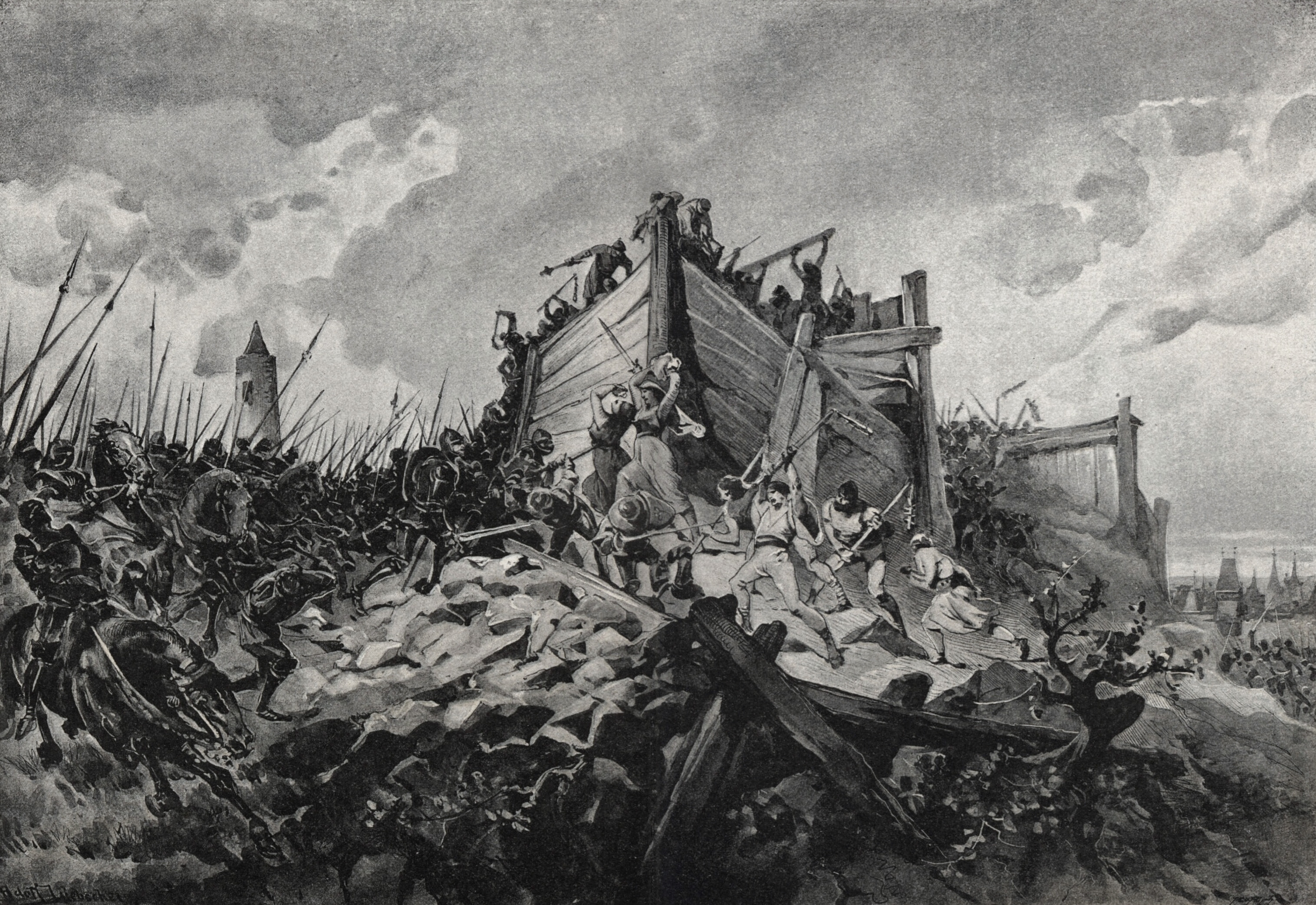
Vitkov Hill

- June 12–July 14 – The Hussites of Jan Zizka defeat the combined forces of the Holy Roman Empire, the Kingdom of Germany, the Duchy of Austria and the Kingdom of Hungary at the Battle of Vítkov Hill on the outskirts of Prague.

=== July–September ===
- August 7 – Construction of the dome of Florence Cathedral is started, after Filippo Brunelleschi wins the commission for his "double shell" design.
- August 31 – A 9.4 M_{S}-strong earthquake shakes Chile's Atacama Region, causing tsunamis in Chile, as well as Hawaii and Japan.
- August – Radu II of Wallachia, supported by the Ottomans, and Dan II, with Hungarian help, start a seven-years-long struggle for the throne of Wallachia, after Michael I is killed in a battle. The throne of Wallachia will switch from one to another about four times until 1427, when Radu II dies.
- September 3 – Murdoch Stewart becomes the new Duke of Albany and Regent of Scotland for King James I, upon the death of his father Robert Stewart. During his time governing Scotland, Murdoch makes no effort to secure King James's release from captivity in England until forced to do so by political pressure.
- September 15 – In a crusade against the Hussites, Holy Roman Imperial forces begin the siege of Vyšehrad
- September 24 – The Ottoman Army defeats a rebellion, led by Miklós Csáki, Voivode of Transylvania (modern Romania). Two days later, the Ottoman troops loot and burn the city of Orăștie and take thousands of Transylvanian civilians as slaves.

=== October–December ===
- October 21 – King Henry V summons the English Parliament, directing its members to assemble at Westminster on December 2.
- October 22 – Ghiyāth al-dīn Naqqāsh, an envoy of the embassy sent by the Timurid ruler of Persia, Shah Rukh (r. 1404–1447), to the Ming dynasty of China during the reign of the Yongle Emperor (r. 1402–1424), records his sight and travel over a large floating pontoon bridge at Lanzhou (constructed in 1372) as he crosses the Yellow River on this day. He writes that it was: "...composed of twenty three boats, of great excellence and strength attached together by a long chain of iron as thick as a man's thigh, and this was moored on each side to an iron post as thick as a man's waist extending a distance of ten cubits on the land and planted firmly in the ground, the boats being fastened to this chain by means of big hooks. There were placed big wooden planks over the boats so firmly and evenly that all the animals were made to pass over it without difficulty."
- October 28 – Beijing ("Northern Capital") is officially designated the capital of Ming dynasty China by the Yongle Emperor, replacing Nanjing, during the same year that the Forbidden City, the seat of government, is completed and construction begins on the Temple of Heaven in the new capital city.
- November 1 – Hussite Wars: Battle of Vyšehrad – Sigismund, Holy Roman Emperor, fails and is ejected from Bohemia.
- November 17 – Hundred Years' War: Melun surrenders to the English.
- December 2 – The 9th Parliament of King Henry V of England is opened at Westminster, and selects Roger Hunt as Speaker of the House of Commons.

=== Date unknown ===
- Tang Saier starts a rebellion against the emperor of China, and takes two cities with her rebel army, before she is defeated.
- Alexander the Good defends Moldavia against the first incursion by the Ottomans, at the Cetatea Albă fortress.
- Henry V of England's flagship Grace Dieu is commissioned and makes her only voyage.

== Births ==
- February 9 – Dorothea of Brandenburg, Duchess of Mecklenburg (d. 1491)
- April 23 – George of Poděbrady, King of Bohemia (d. 1471)
- June 5 – Anna of Saxony, Landgravine of Hesse, German royalty (d. 1462)
- July 19 – William VIII of Montferrat (d. 1483)
- October 1 – Elisabeth of Cleves, Countess of Schwarzburg-Blankenburg, German noble (d. 1488)
- October 14 – Tomás de Torquemada, first grand inquisitor of Spain (d. 1498)
- approximate date
  - Jean Fouquet, French painter (d. 1481)
  - Nicolas Jenson, French engraver (d. 1480)

== Deaths ==
- June 11 – John III, Burgrave of Nuremberg (b. c. 1369)
- June 12 – Adolf I, Count of Nassau-Siegen (b. 1362)
- August – Michael I, ruler of Wallachia (killed in battle)
- August 9 – Pierre d'Ailly, French theologian and cardinal (b. 1351)
- September 3 – Robert Stewart, Duke of Albany, regent of Scotland (b. 1339)
- date unknown
  - Marina Galina, Dogaressa of Venice
  - Epiphanius the Wise, Russian hagiographer
  - King Lukeni lua Nimi of the Kingdom of Kongo (b. 1380)
