= Battle of Panský Bor =

- Part of the Hussite Wars
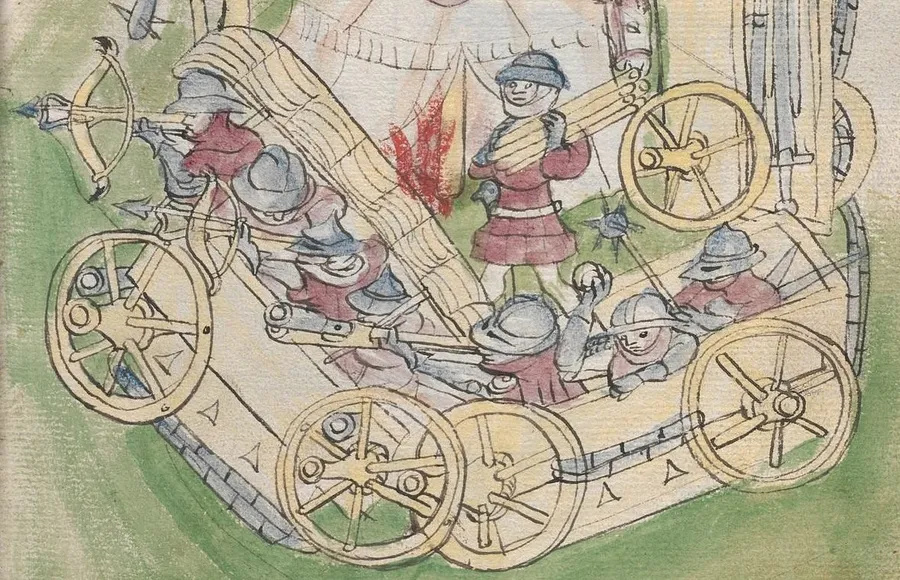
- Hussite Wagon fort
Date	12 October 1420
Location	Near Malý Bor, close to Horažďovice, Bohemia
Result	Hussite victory

Belligerents
Taborites	Holy Roman Empire: Rosenberg forces; Pilsen Landfriede; South Bohemian Catholic nobility; Austrian mercenaries; Chotěšov Provostry; Kingdom of Hungary

Commanders and leaders
Jan Žižka	Oldřich II of Rosenberg; Lipolt I Krajíř of Krajk; Bohuslav of Švamberk; Henry of Plauen

Strength
Unknown	Unknown

Casualties and losses
Approximately 800, according to Eberhard Windecke	Approximately 800 Hungarians and Germans, according to Eberhard Windecke

The Battle of Panský Bor, also known as the Battle of Horažďovice, took place on 12 October 1420 on a hill near the Romanesque Church of Saint Mary Magdalene in present-day Malý Bor, near Horažďovice in the Plzeň Region of the Czech Republic. Hussite forces under the command of the Taborite hetman Jan Žižka defeated a combined army of the Rosenbergs, South and West Bohemian nobles, and foreign troops serving King Sigismund of Luxembourg.

The result of the battle thwarted the plans of the Bohemian nobles to establish control over southern Bohemia and allowed the Hussites to continue their offensive, particularly against the estates of Oldřich II of Rosenberg.

== Prelude ==
After the dissolution of the army of the First Crusade against the Hussites, the Taborite army left Prague on 22 August 1420 and returned towards its main base. Most of the Taborites returned to Hradiště, while a smaller contingent led by Jan Žižka moved to Písek. In this centre of the Hussite movement, the one-eyed hetman began gathering forces for an autumn offensive against the enemies of the Utraquist faith in southern and western Bohemia. His principal opponent was Oldřich II of Rosenberg, who had returned to the Catholic faith in the second half of June. The young nobleman, then seventeen years old, had attracted Hussite hostility not only through his change of religious allegiance but also through a recent attack against Tábor and his persecution of Hussite communities and Utraquist priests.

The first target of Žižka's army was the royal town of Vodňany, which was then under Rosenberg control. Žižka succeeded in capturing it during the first days of September.

He subsequently joined forces with the Utraquist nobleman Oldřich Vavák of Hradec, with whom he began military operations in the southeastern part of southern Bohemia. Together they captured Lomnice and Bystřice. During these operations, the wife and daughter of Lipolt I Krajíř of Krajek, the captain of České Budějovice, fell into their hands.

Žižka then apparently received information that an army was gathering in the territory of the Pilsen Landfriede and turned back towards the Písek region. On the way, he captured Trhové Sviny and occupied Horažďovice. From there, he advanced against the fortress at Panský Bor, which he besieged in early October. Despite the defenders' determined resistance, he captured and burned the fortress.

Shortly afterwards, however, he learned that a powerful enemy army was assembling near Horažďovice. Having been informed of Žižka's activities, it was advancing towards the burning fortress.

The exact strength of this army is unknown. It consisted of forces belonging to Oldřich of Rosenberg, the Pilsen Landfriede and South Bohemian Catholic nobles, commanded by Bohuslav of Švamberk and Henry of Plauen, lord of Kynžvart. It also included soldiers serving the provost of Chotěšov Abbey, Austrian mercenaries, and Hungarian and German troops led by Lipolt Krajíř of Krajek, whom King Sigismund had sent to assist his Catholic subjects.

As soon as Žižka's scouts informed him of the approaching danger, he ordered his army to move to a nearby hill, where a fortified Romanesque church dating from the twelfth century stood. There, he arranged his soldiers into a wagon fort and awaited the enemy.

== Battle ==
Several written sources describe the events of 12 October 1420, and they provide a relatively consistent picture of the engagement. The battle was a classic example of the use of a wagon fort against repeated charges by heavy cavalry. The Hussites were apparently at a considerable numerical disadvantage, but their choice of a suitable defensive position and their use of the churchyard wall as an additional obstacle enabled them to hold their ground and emerge victorious.

The Hussite Chronicle, written by the scholar and direct participant in the Hussite Wars Laurence of Březová, records the battle as follows:

Then, on the Saturday after Saint Denis's Day, the men of Lord Oldřich of Rosenberg, Švamberk and the other lords of the Pilsen region, together with the provost of Chotěšov, engaged in a hostile encounter with Žižka and his Taborites at the castle of Bor near Horažďovice. There were killed, wounded and captured on both sides, but more on the side of the lords; nevertheless, Žižka won the battle in the field.

— Laurence of Březová

The engagement is also mentioned in one manuscript of the Old Czech Annals. However, the chronicler mistakenly placed it in 1421, thereby combining two separate campaigns by Žižka in the same region.

Previously, Žižka had besieged Panský Bor near Horažďovice and remained there until the defenders surrendered. When they handed over the fortress, he immediately burned it, because he did not know that reinforcements were approaching. When he learned of their arrival, he marched up towards the church and prepared for battle there. The lord of Rosenberg came against him with a great number of men, accompanied by Krajíř with many Germans and many others. From the other side came Lord Bohuslav of Švamberk with the lord of Plauen, together with many other Germans and men from Pilsen.

Thus they surrounded him on all sides, for a great multitude had gathered against him. But he defended himself bravely, placing his faith in the Lord God, and together with his brethren he killed and wounded many enemies, inflicting great damage and disgrace upon them, so that they had to flee ignominiously. Žižka remained alone on the battlefield and then continued on his way.

— Old Czech Annals

The victory of the one-eyed Taborite hetman is also mentioned by the author of his short biography, completed probably in the middle of the fifteenth century and entitled Chronicle of the Very Fine Life of Jan Žižka (Kronika velmi pěkná o Janu Žižkovi). The author states in a single sentence that Žižka captured Bor, inflicted heavy losses on his enemies and continued his campaign. However, the event is placed chronologically after the Battle of Vyšehrad on 1 November.

Information about the casualties and the participation of German and Hungarian contingents comes from Eberhard Windecke, a court biographer and chronicler of King Sigismund. In the autumn of 1420, Windecke was staying in nearby České Budějovice. His account gives the number of dead as 800 Germans and Hungarians and an equal number of Hussites.

== Aftermath ==
After his victory, Žižka probably did not pursue the enemy. Instead, he remained on the battlefield to care for his wounded and bury the dead. Although the West and South Bohemian nobility had assembled the strongest army they could, Žižka remained the dominant military force in the region.

Nevertheless, the victory had also weakened the Hussite ranks through the losses suffered in the fighting. Žižka therefore returned first to Písek, where he had to reorganise his forces.
