= Oldřich II of Rosenberg =

Bohemian nobleman (1403–1462)

- Governor of the House of Rosenberg
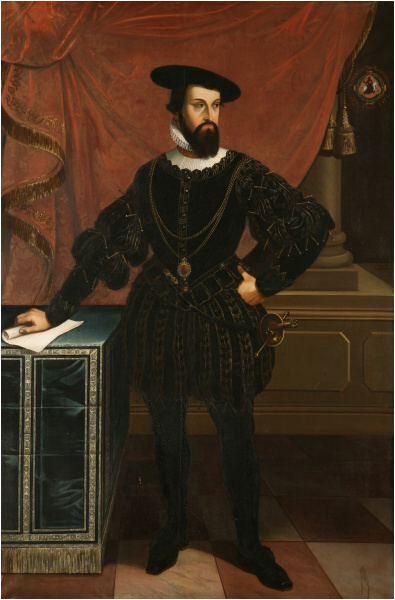
- 19th century portrait of Oldřich II by Charles Louis Philippot

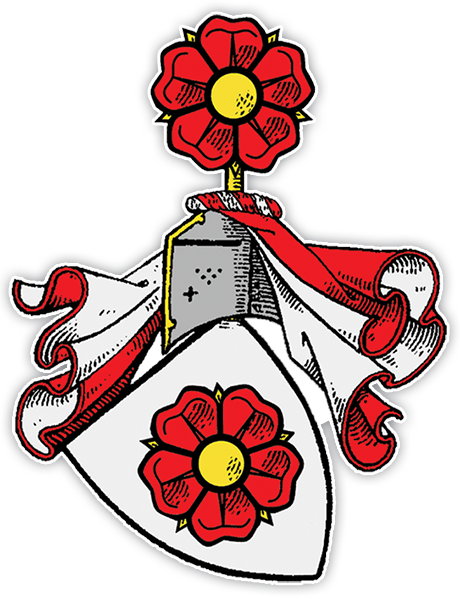
- Coat of arms
- Native name: Oldřich II. z Rožmberka
- Born: 13 January 1403
- Died: 28 April 1462 (aged 59); Český Krumlov
- Buried: Vyšší Brod Monastery
- Noble family: Rosenberg family
- Wife: Kateřina of Vartemberk
- Issue: Henry IV of Rosenberg; Jošt II of Rosenberg; John II of Rosenberg; Anežka of Rosenberg; Perchta of Rosenberg; Lidmila of Rosenberg
- Father: Henry III of Rosenberg
- Mother: Eliška of Kravaře

Oldřich II of Rosenberg (Czech: Oldřich II. z Rožmberka; 13 January 1403 – 28 April 1462) was an important Bohemian nobleman who, after the Battle of Lipany, became a recognized leader of the Catholic lords in Bohemia.

== Biography ==
Oldřich II increased the power of the Rosenberg family after taking advantage of the weakening royal power during the Hussite wars. Oldřich was initially sympathetic for the Hussite movement, a position influenced by his guardian Čeněk of Wartenberg. However, after the Hussites burned down the town of Sezimovo Ústí in 1420 and founded Tábor on the very northern border of the Rosenberg State, Oldřich became a leading ally of Emperor Sigismund and acted as a negotiator and diplomat. Sigismund appointed him governor of the Bechyně region and Prácheňsko.

Oldřich II was defeated in the Battle of Tábor and in the Battle of Panský Bor near modern-day Malý Bor, and participated in the Battle of Vyšehrad in 1420. He found later military success in the Battle of Lipany in 1434 and saw to the destruction of the remaining Hussite forces at the Battle of Křeč in 1435.

During the 15th century, the Rosenberg State dominated almost the entire area of southern Bohemia. In addition to property gains, Oldřich II forged documents stating the Rosenberg family was to receive special privileges from the monarchy. He counterfeited wax seals and amended original documents. A set of documents, allegedly issued by Charles IV, Holy Roman Emperor in 1360, claimed the indivisibility of the Rosenberg State and the establishment of the title of Governor of the House of Rosenberg. These claims were fully legalized in 1493 after approval by the Bohemian Diet and entry in the land records. They were observed until the extinction of the Rosenberg family on November 6, 1611.

Oldřich II also falsified a legend about the origin of the Rosenbergs from the ancient Roman family Ursini. Together with the Italian Orsini family, they reached an agreement confirming their fictional common origin.

Oldřich II was likely a member of the Order of the Dragon. He was later depicted in the 1956 film Against All and played by Václav Špidla.
