= William Zajíc of Valdek and Židlochovice =

15th-century Bohemian nobleman

- Lord of Židlochovice; Governor of Luxembourg
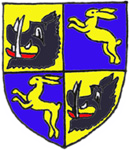
- Coat of arms
- Native name: Vilém Zajíc z Valdeka na Židlochovicích
- Died: 1 November 1420
- Wife: Dorota of Rabštejn
- Father: Zbyněk Zajíc
- Mother: Kateřina of Litomyšl

William Zajíc of Valdek and Židlochovice (died 1 November 1420) was a Bohemian nobleman and politician.

== Biography ==
William Zajíc began his career as a wage mercenary in the service Jobst of Moravia, the Margrave of Moravia. In 1399, he was recruited by Prokop of Moravia to fight against Jobst in the Moravian Margrave Wars. After the war, William Zajíc re-entered the service of Jobst, this time in a diplomatic position.

In 1403, William Zajíc made a pilgrimage to Rome, and in 1405, a pilgrimage to Santiago de Compostela. In 1407, Margrave Jobst granted him Židlochovice. He was then sent on a diplomatic mission to France. At the very end of 1407, Jobst appointed him governor of the Duchy of Luxembourg. William Zajíc participated in diplomatic negotiations in Prague at the court of Wenceslas IV. He also participated in meetings of provincial courts in Prague, Brno and Olomouc.

After the death of Margrave Jobst in 1411, William Zajíc entered the service of King Wenceslas IV. Dissatisfied, he left Wenceslas and was appointed court councilor to Sigismund of Luxembourg in 1412. In 1414, William Zajíc was sent to negotiate with Jan Hus in Konstanz. At the end of 1417, he returned to Moravia, where he participated in a session of the provincial courts. He again entered Sigismund's service in 1418 and was granted the castle of Blansek. In 1419, he purchased the village and castle of Nosislav.

In 1420, William Zajíc took part in Sigismund's campaign in Bohemia and the siege of Prague before the Battle of Vítkov Hill. On 1 November 1420, together with other Moravian lords, he took part in the Battle of Vyšehrad, where he was killed in action. He died without male descendants.
