= Battle of Poříčí nad Sázavou =

- Part of the Hussite Wars
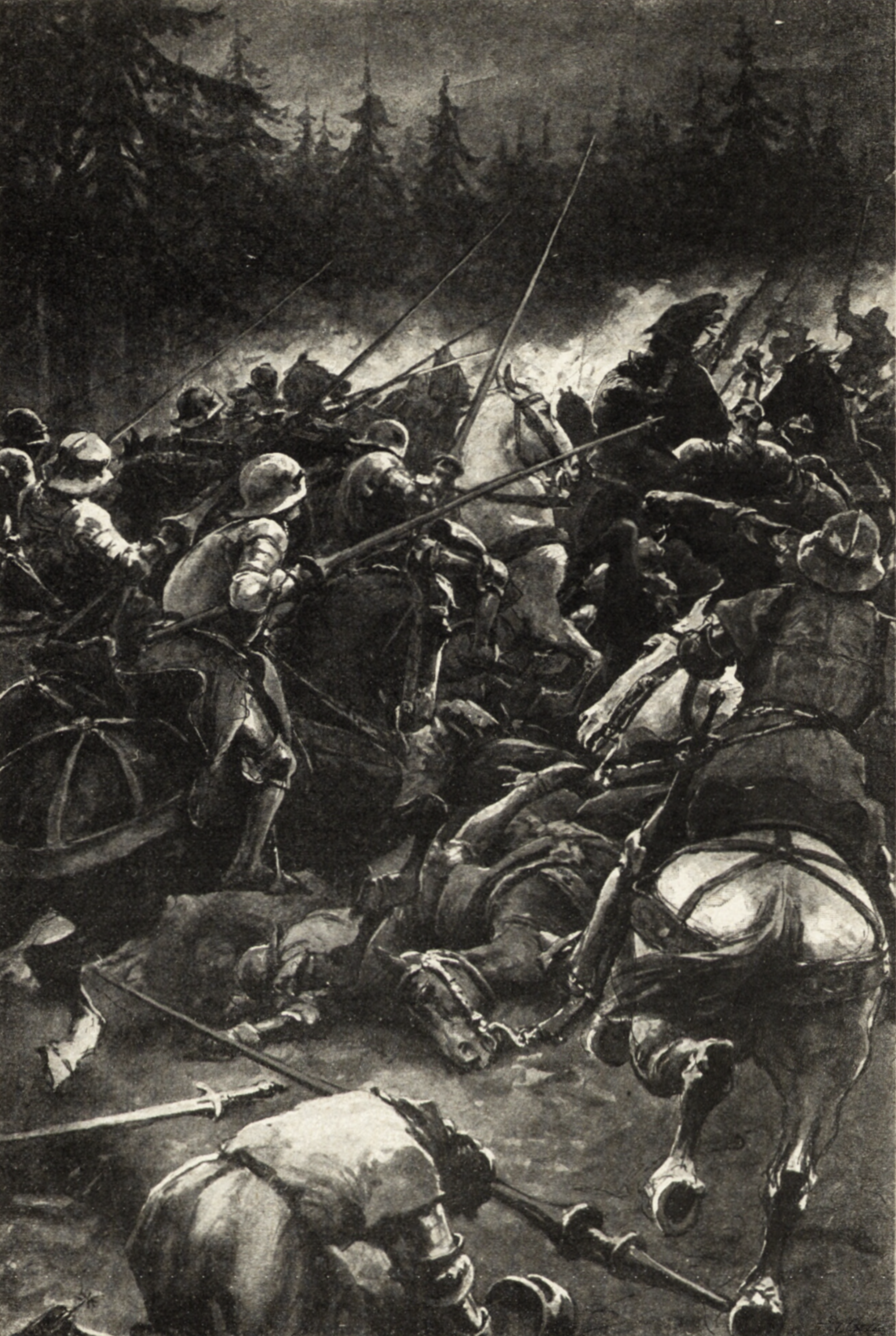
- Image from the battle of Poříčí nad Sázavou (novel Jan Žižkal, 1925)
Date	19–20 May 1420
Location	Poříčí nad Sázavou, Benešov District, Central Bohemian Region, Bohemia
Result	Hussite victory

Belligerents
Taborites	Catholic Bohemian nobility Crusade forces: Holy Roman Empire; Kingdom of Hungary; Duchy of Świdnica; Troops from Kutná Hora

Commanders and leaders
Mikuláš of Hus; Jan Žižka	Petr Konopišťský ze Šternberka; Wenceslaus of Dubá; Janek of Chotěnice; Pippo Spano of Ozora; Wenceslaus Doninský

Strength
Contemporary estimates: Old Czech Annals: approximately 3,000; Chronicle of the Old Prague Collegiate: approximately 9,000	Contemporary estimates: Chronicle of the Old Prague Collegiate: fewer than 11,600 cavalry and infantry

Casualties and losses
Unknown	Approximately 20 killed according to Laurence of Březová; approximately 50 according to the Chronicle of the Old Prague Collegiate

The Battle of Poříčí nad Sázavou took place during the night of 19–20 May 1420 near the present-day municipality of Poříčí nad Sázavou, at an uncertain location beyond the Sázava River, in the vicinity of present-day Městečko. A Hussite army travelling from the settlement of Tábor to assist the threatened city of Prague successfully broke through an encirclement formed by the forces of Catholic Bohemian nobles and troops of the crusading army of King Sigismund of Luxembourg.

The victory enabled the Hussites to reach their destination without further opposition and make a significant contribution to the defence of the Bohemian capital.

== Prelude ==
On March 1 1420, Pope Martin V acceded to the request of Sigismund of Luxembourg, King of the Romans and Hungary, and issued the bull Omnium plasmatoris domini in Florence, declaring a crusade against all followers of John Wycliffe and the Hussites. The crusade was solemnly proclaimed on 17 March in Wrocław (Breslau), where an assembly of the estates of the Holy Roman Empire was taking place.

King Sigismund took advantage of the presence of the imperial princes to agree on the terms of the expedition. By the end of April, his army, which had assembled in the Silesian Duchy of Świdnica (Schweidnitz), had crossed the borders of the Kingdom of Bohemia. On 3 May, Hradec Králové surrendered to the crusaders, whose army then moved towards Kutná Hora, where preparations were under way for a campaign against Prague. The Bohemian capital was in a difficult position.

The Hussites had still been unable to capture Vyšehrad. Moreover, on 7 May, Čeněk of Wartenberg, the highest burgrave of Prague Castle, handed the residence of the Bohemian rulers over to representatives of King Sigismund. In addition, before the middle of May, approximately 364 letters reached the two Prague town halls, in which Bohemian lords, knights and municipalities declared their hostility towards the inhabitants of the capital. In response, the people of Prague sent an embassy to Kutná Hora to negotiate a compromise with the king, but the conditions they proposed for resolving the situation were unacceptable to him.

During a stormy meeting of the town representatives, it was therefore decided to request assistance from Hussite communities throughout Bohemia and to resist the crusaders by force of arms. The appeal reached the Hussite settlement at Tábor on 17 May, and the following day a relief detachment under the command of Mikuláš of Hus set out for Prague.

Contemporary chroniclers left two very different estimates of the size of the force. The author of the so-called Chronicle of the Old Prague Collegiate gives a figure of 9,000 people, including women and children, whereas the Old Czech Annals (manuscript Sa) gives 3,000. (Note: Historian Josef Macek favoured the account of the Chronicle of the Old Prague Collegiate, arguing that only a small garrison must have remained at Tábor, since cavalry under Mikuláš of Hus later had to be sent from Prague to assist it. Historian Josef Pekař held a different view, considering the figure greatly exaggerated, as Laurence of Březová explicitly states in his Hussite Chronicle that the Taborites had left many people behind to defend the hill settlement near Ústí.)

The Hussites travelled towards Benešov, which was subject to the lords of Konopiště and Sternberg. There, approximately 400 cavalrymen accompanied by infantry, under the command of Hanuš of Polensko, the reeve of Lower Lusatia, opposed their advance. The force had been prepared to prevent the Hussites from entering the town, but the approaching column bypassed it by another route. (Note: According to Otakar Frankenberger, the Hussites entered the town from the east, concealed by the left slope of the Benešov Stream valley.) The Hussites entered among the houses and set fire to the local church and rectory.

Their principal aim had been to capture the Minorite monastery, but the fire, which meanwhile spread throughout the town, prevented them from doing so. After leaving Benešov, the Hussites continued towards the village of Poříčí, crossed the Sázava River and camped on its right bank, probably at a bend in the river. They soon noticed that an enemy force was advancing towards them.

They therefore quickly resumed their march in search of more suitable ground on which to form a wagon fort, since the terrain on the right bank of the Sázava was relatively flat. During their advance, which probably led towards the heights bordering the road to Prague near Městečko and Nespeky, they soon found themselves being surrounded, as the enemy advanced towards them in a converging movement from the north, west and east.

== Battle ==
The royal army consisted of several contingents. The first was commanded by Peter Konopišťský of Sternberg, who was joined by Wenceslaus of Dubá and Leštno, the underchamberlain, with mercenaries from both Prague castles. This force reportedly numbered 1,600 cavalrymen. Another contingent consisted of crusaders serving Sigismund of Luxembourg, commanded by Janek of Chotěnice, a captain from Świdnica, Pippo of Ozora and Wenceslaus Doninský, the reeve of Kutná Hora. This force reportedly numbered 10,000 men. (Note: Historian František Šmahel considers these figures exaggerated. Assuming that the Hussite force numbered 3,000 people, including women and children, he suggests that the crusaders and Bohemian nobles together numbered no more than 2,000 more.)

In the early evening of 19 May, these forces succeeded in surrounding the Hussites on all sides. During the first hours after nightfall, they launched an attack that was apparently poorly coordinated. One of the most authentic accounts of the entire engagement was written by Laurence of Březová, a writer, master of the arts faculty at the University of Prague and a direct participant in the Hussite Wars:

Although it was night, the Taborites prepared their weapons, cannons, crossbows, spears, clubs and flails, and attacked their enemies amid the clatter of their flails. By God's permission, after a fierce clash, they put them to flight, killing nearly twenty of their enemies and capturing many of their spears and banners marked with red crosses. They then hastened peacefully to Prague, and no one obstructed them any further.

— Laurence of Březová

Although this passage does not establish the exact location of the fighting, it is clear that the Hussites managed at the last moment to arrange their wagons into a defensive formation and defend themselves effectively. The determination of the defenders, following fierce fighting, broke the initial enemy assault, and the entire royal army fled.

Poor visibility, the noise of firearms and the first soldiers retreating, who spread panic among the ranks behind them, probably contributed to the confusion. Although Mikuláš of Hus most likely commanded the Taborite column, it is possible that the military operations followed a plan devised and carried out by Jan Žižka.

== Aftermath ==
Following their victory, the Taborites set out for Prague without resting. The city's inhabitants welcomed them in the afternoon of 20 May. The supporters of King Sigismund did not dare to undertake another action, and the Hussites completed their march without further armed confrontation.

The engagement itself demonstrated the military abilities of the leading Taborite commanders and the effective organisation of the Hussite community.

Whereas Laurence of Březová records that the crusaders lost 20 men, the Chronicle of the Old Prague Collegiate gives a figure of 50.
