= Philippot =

Philippot (English: /fɪˈlɪpoʊ/, French: [filipɔ]) is a surname. Notable people with the surname include:

- Alice Marie Yvonne Philippot (1904–1987), French/Mexican poet and artist
- Charles Louis Philippot (1801–1859), French artist
- Florian Philippot (born 1981), French politician and Member of the European Parliament
- Jean-Paul Philippot (born 1960), Belgian television producer and President on the European Broadcasting Union
- Karine Laurent Philippot (born 1974), French cross country skier
- Michel Philippot (1925–1996), French composer, mathematician, acoustician, musicologist, aesthetician, broadcaster and educator
