= Krec (disambiguation) =

Krec or KREC may refer to:

- KREC, a radio station in Utah, United States
- KREC (rap band), a Russian band
- KREC, the former name of National Institute of Technology Karnataka in Mangalore, India
- Křeč, a municipality and village in the Czech Republic
