= Battle of Křeč =

Battle of the Hussite Wars

Coordinates: 49°23′14″N 14°55′58″E

- Part of Post-Hussite Wars
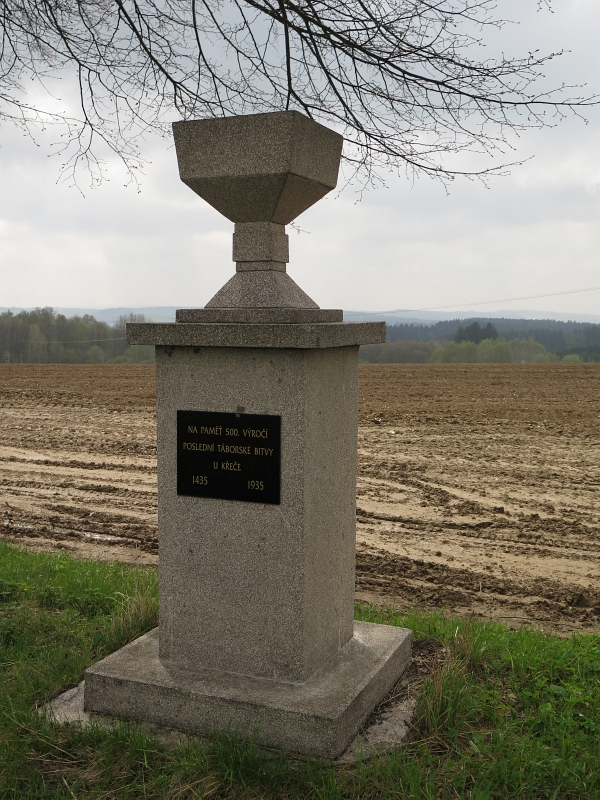
- Memory to the battle
Date	19 August 1435
Location	Křeč, Bohemia
Result	Rosenberg's Catholic victory

Belligerents
Rosenberg's forces	Taborites

Commanders and leaders
Oldřich II of Rosenberg	Unknown

Strength
Unknown	800–1,000 infantry 100 cavalry

Casualties and losses
Unknown	800 killed

The Battle of Křeč occurred on 19 August 1435 and was the last real battle of the Hussite Wars. A year earlier, the Battle of Lipany brought an end to most Radical Hussite power in Bohemia, but some groups had still continued fighting. Oldřich II of Rosenberg defeated the Taborites near the village of Křeč, which brought an end to their ability to carry out attacks. After this battle, the radical Hussites at Tábor began to seek an agreement with Emperor Sigismund.
