= Mikuláš of Hus =

Czech politician (d. 1420)

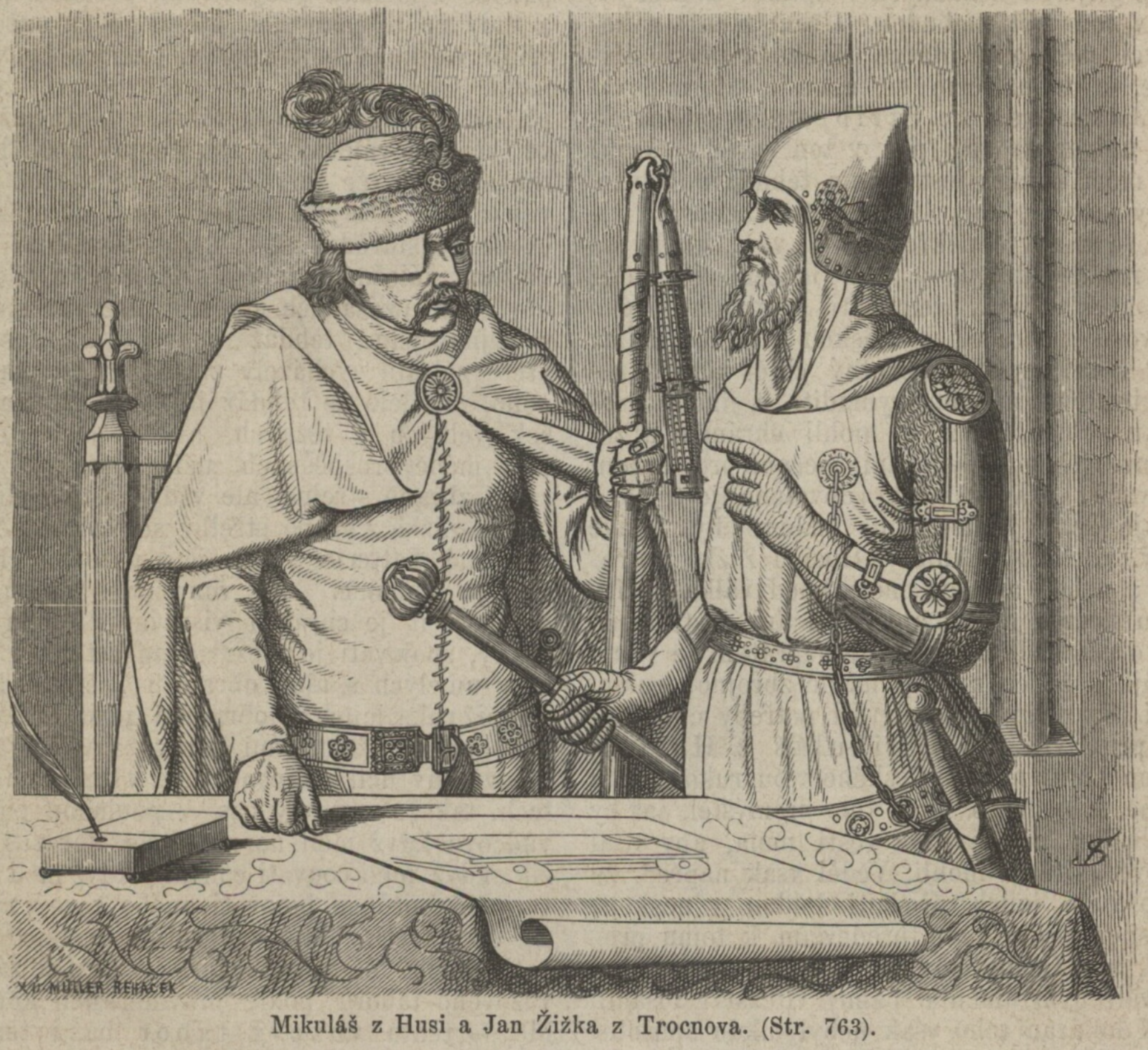
- Mikuláš of Hus and Jan Žižka
- Born: 1375
- Died: December 24, 1420; Prague
- Military career
- Conflicts: Hussite Wars: Attack on Malá Strana; Battle of Poříčí nad Sázavou; Battle of Tábor; Battle of Vyšehrad

Mikuláš of Hus (Czech: Mikuláš z Husi [ˈmɪkulaːʒ z ˈɦusɪ]; died 24 December 1420) was a Bohemian politician and leading representative of the Hussite movement. He died unexpectedly on 24 December 1420, leaving the position of first captain of the Taborites open to Jan Žižka.
