= Battle of Tábor =

1420 battle of the Hussite Wars

Coordinates: 49°24′40″N 14°39′16″E

- Part of the Hussite Wars
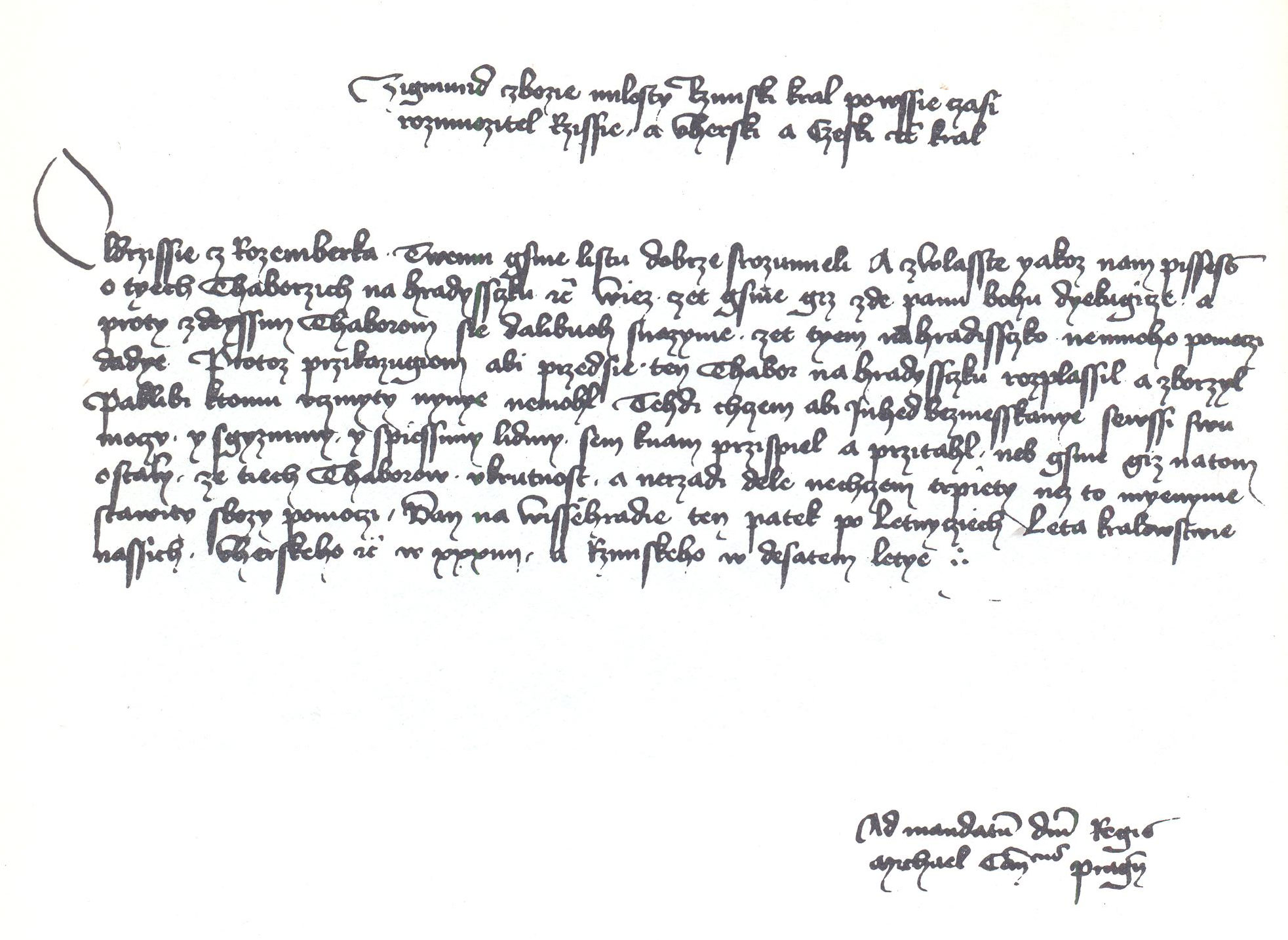
- Letter from King Sigismund ordering Oldřich II of Rosenberg to demolish Tábor
Date	30 June 1420
Location	Tábor, Bohemia
Result	Decisive Hussite victory

Belligerents
Holy Roman Empire: Austrian mercenaries; Rosenberg forces; Catholic crusaders	Hussite coalition: Taborites

Commanders and leaders
Oldřich II of Rosenberg; Lipolt Krajíř of Krajek	Mikuláš of Hus

Strength
4,800 cavalry and infantry: 4,000 Austrian cavalry; 500 mercenaries; 300 Rosenberg gunmen	Unknown: Reinforcement of 350 cavalry

Casualties and losses
Considerable losses	Unknown

The Battle of Tábor took place in the early morning hours of 30 June 1420 in a locality between Tismenický stream and the Lužnice near the walls of a newly emerging Hussite village called Tábor. Between 3,000 and 9,000 Taborites, including women and children, remained in the village after a Hussite detachment left for Prague. Taking advantage of their weakened state, Oldřich II of Rosenberg laid siege to the village. He commanded a force composed of his own gunmen and Austrian mercenaries led by Lipolt Krajíř of Krajek, the governor of České Budějovice.

Learning of the siege, Mikuláš of Hus left Prague with 350 cavalry and returned to Tábor. In the early morning of 30 June 1420, he attacked the sleeping besiegers. Oldřich II of Rosenberg and his allies were caught off-guard by the attack and scattered, suffering heavy losses in their retreat. The Hussite victory lifted a week long siege, while Oldřich II missed the opportunity to eliminate the base of radical Hussites in the immediate vicinity of his estates.
