= Pippo Spano =

Italian magnate, general, strategist and confidant of King Sigismund of Hungary

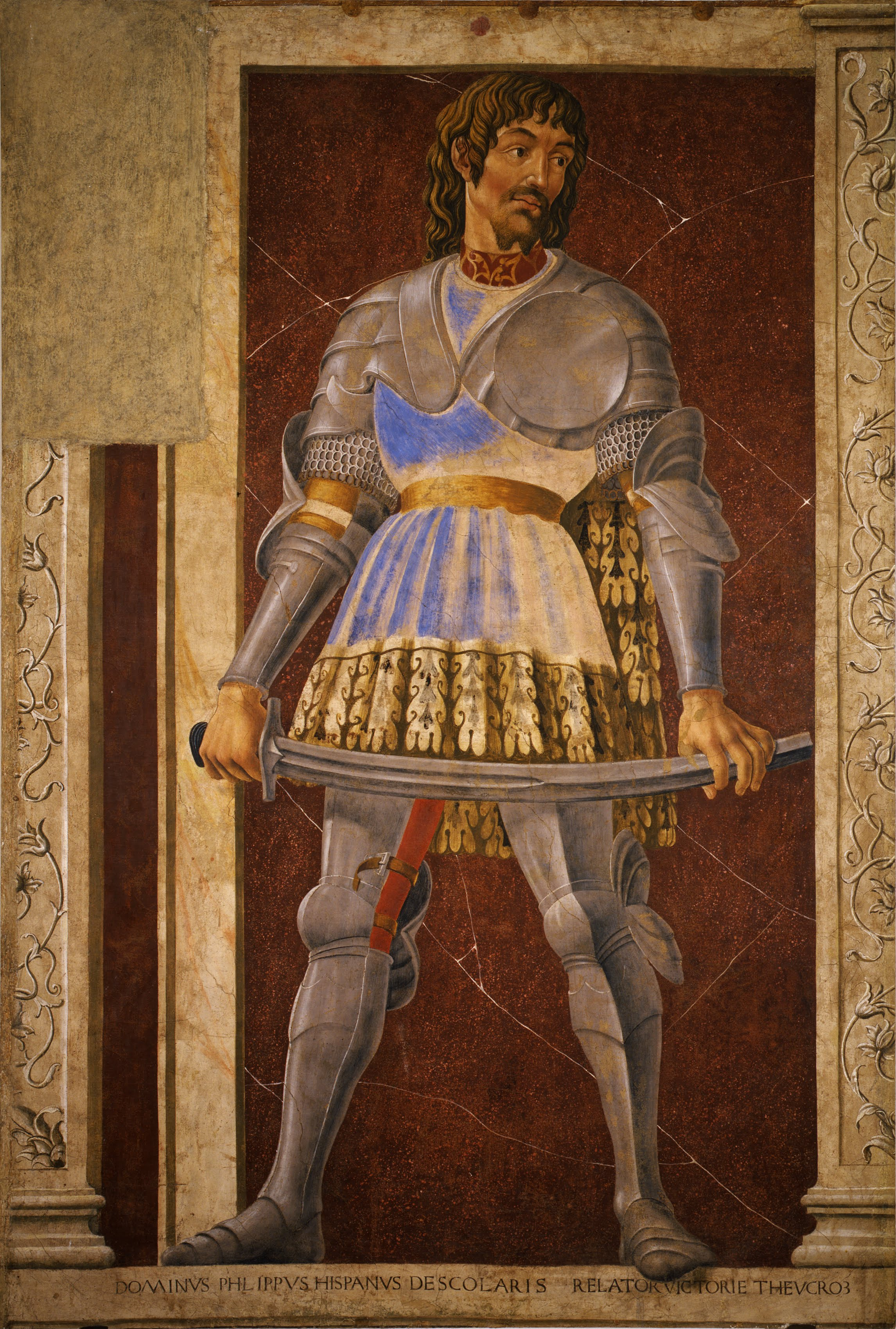
- Fresco by Andrea del Castagno (c. 1450)
- Born: 1369; Republic of Florence
- Died: December 1426 (aged 56–57); Lipova
- Buried: Székesfehérvár Basilica
- Wars and battles: Venetian–Hungarian War: Battle of Motta
- Noble family: Buondelmonti degli Scolari
- Occupation: Hungarian magnate, general; Italian condottiere.

Filippo Buondelmonti degli Scolari (1369 – December 1426), known as Pippo Spano, was an Italian magnate, general, strategist and confidant of King Sigismund of Hungary, born in the Republic of Florence. The personal friend of Sigismund and member of the Order of the Dragon, he was buried in the Székesfehérvár Basilica beside the Hungarian kings.

== Early career ==
Filippo, the son of a destitute Florentine nobleman, was born at Tizzano, near Florence. He is first mentioned in Hungary around 1382, when he entered the service of Sigismund's treasurer and was awarded the castle in Simontornya (Simonsthurm).

Further services to the Crown, such as providing resources to fight the Ottomans, led to his appointment as administrator of all gold mines in the kingdom. Present in Bosnia, in the context of a Hungarian nobles' rebellion and King Tvrtko I of Bosnia's death (1391), Pippo managed to subdue the main leaders of the revolt.

He took part in the unfortunate anti-Ottoman final Crusade of September 1396 at Nicopolis in Bulgaria, and, unlike most on the Christian side, managed to flee after the defeat. He, the King, and a number of high dignitaries sailed a small boat up the Danube, all the way to Hungarian and Croatian lands.

He married Barbara, daughter and heir of Andrew of Ozora, in 1398.

During the new period of trouble with the claim to the throne of Charles II's son Ladislaus of Naples, Lo Scolari exposed acts of treason on the part of some noblemen. He was however forced to give in to most of their demands, as the King was taken prisoner in Visegrád Castle (1401).

After Sigismund reasserted control briefly, the nobles openly recognized Ladislaus as King. The forces of the Kingdom of Naples took Zadar in 1403, and Pippo had to retreat; the same year, he regained Veszprém and, in September, took Esztergom and again raided Bosnia - breaking up contacts between Sicilian and rebel armies and forcing the invaders to flee. He persuaded the rebels to seek Sigismund's pardon.

While in Vienna, Pippo was made Count of Temesvár (today Timișoara, Romania). In this capacity, he initiated the building of the Hungarian border castle system to contain the Ottoman aggression; immediately, Pippo started confronting the Turks, but also moving against the Bosnian armies of Hrvoje Vukčić Hrvatinić that had been besieging the town of Šibenik in Dalmatia, regaining parts of today's Croatia.

== In Italy ==
In 1408, Pippo became the Ban of Szörény and member of the prestigious Order of the Dragon; by that time, he had become wealthy and powerful. In 1410, Sigismund sent him to persuade Italian city-states to cut off their links with Naples: he traveled in great pomp to his native Florence, then to Ferrara (meeting Niccolò III d'Este). In August, he was received by Pisan Antipope John XXIII. In September, present in Venice, Pippo is said to have backed a conspiracy.

As part of the anti-Venetian campaign of 1411, Lo Scolari entered Friuli at the head of an army, conquered Aquileia and, in December, he took Udine and several fortresses in Romagna, then Vittorio Veneto - capturing a high official from the Barbarigo family. In January 1412, the renewed attack ensured Pippo a supply of high-ranking Venetian prisoners, whom he ordered mutilated to avenge a Hungarian killed by the enemy.

He suffered a major defeat at the Battle of Motta in August 1412 against the Venetian Republic under Carlo Malatesta. Pippo intended to besiege Padua in January, but he could not maintain his army on the spot, and moved towards the Brenta, in Cartigliano and Marostica, leading an unsuccessful attack on Vicenza. Further failures provoked his retreat to Friuli, and then to Hungary, in February. This outcome made Venetian accounts imply a settlement with the Most Serene Republic, and even the mythical execution of Pippo as revenge by the Emperor King (he supposedly had molten gold poured down his throat).

Lo Scolari returned to Friuli in September, in order to aid Florence against Ladislaus' troops. At Lodi (in Lombardy), he attended the meeting between Sigismund and the ruler of the city, Giovanni da Vignate.

== Later assignments ==
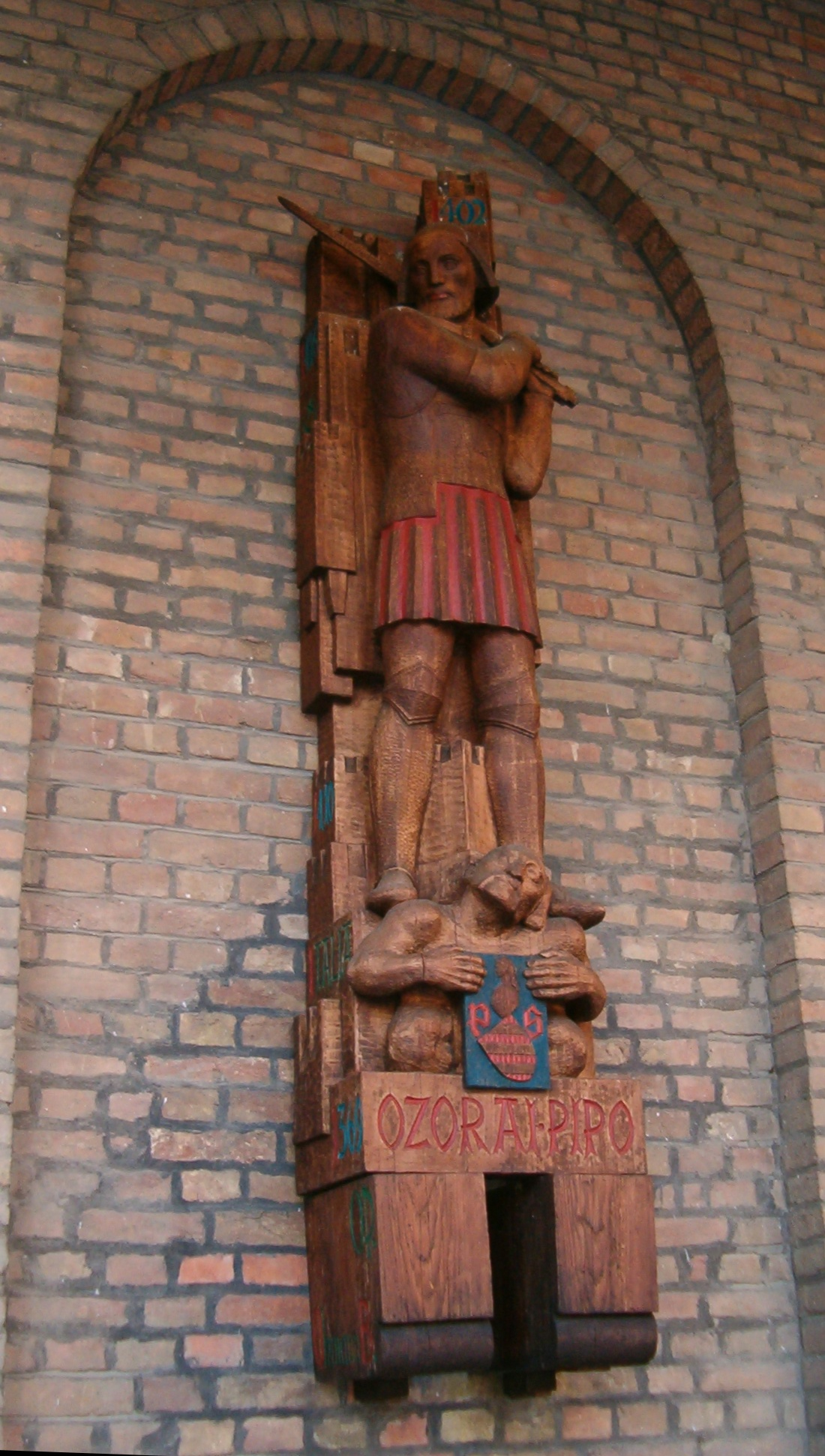
Pippo in Dóm square Szeged

Pippo took part in the March 1414 initial proceedings of the Council of Constance, where the Emperor King charged him with guarding John XXIII - an assignment he did not fully accomplish, as the Antipope soon managed to flee. In 1415, the Count of Temesvár witnessed the rebel Jan Hus' execution in Konstanz.

He fought the Turks again in 1417 in Wallachia, in 1418 around Belgrade, and in 1419 in Bosnia (where he agreed to a five-year truce); the King Emperor awarded him Severin, Mehadia and Orşova. He was called to Bohemia, where he dealt with the Hussite insurrection from 1420 (see Battle of Vítkov Hill), being severely beaten by Jan Žižka at Havlíčkův Brod (see Battle of Německý Brod), in January 1422.

The rumor that Pippo had been killed in Bohemia led to an Ottoman attack in Wallachia against his ally Prince Dan II. Prompted by requests from Stefan Lazarević, he moved into Serbia and won a large-scale battle. In 1425 Scolari, Dan II and the Bulgarian prince Frujin Asen crossed the Danube and defeated the Ottomans near Vetren and captured Silistra. In 1426, he defeated the Turks in a pitched battle near Golubac. However, he suffered a stroke after the battle and was carried to Lippa (today Lipova, Romania) where he died. He was buried in Székesfehérvár, next to the tombs of the Hungarian kings, his funeral being attended by King Sigismund in person.

== Legacy ==
He was enumerated in Serbian epic poetry, known as "Filip the Magyar (Hungarian)" (Serbian: Филип Мађарин, Bulgarian: Филип Маджарин).

== Annotations ==
1. His short name was Filippo Scolari. He was commonly known under his lifetime as "Pippo Spano". He is known in Hungarian historiography as Pipo of Ozora (Hungarian: Ozorai Pipó).

== Sources ==
- Domenico Mellini (1570). Vita Di Filippo Scolari, Volgarmente Chiamato Pippo Spano. Sermartelli.
- Domenico Mellini (1606). Vita del capitano Filippo Scolari ... chiamato Pippo Spano conte di Temesvar ... riveduta et accresciuta dal autore. - Firenze, Sermartelli 1606. Nella Stamperia del Sermartelli.
- Gizella Nemeth; Gizella Nemeth Papo; Adriano Papo (2006). Pippo Spano: un eroe antiturco antesignano del Rinascimento. Edizioni della Laguna. ISBN 978-88-8345-219-2.
