= War wagon =

Early unpowered armored fighting vehicle

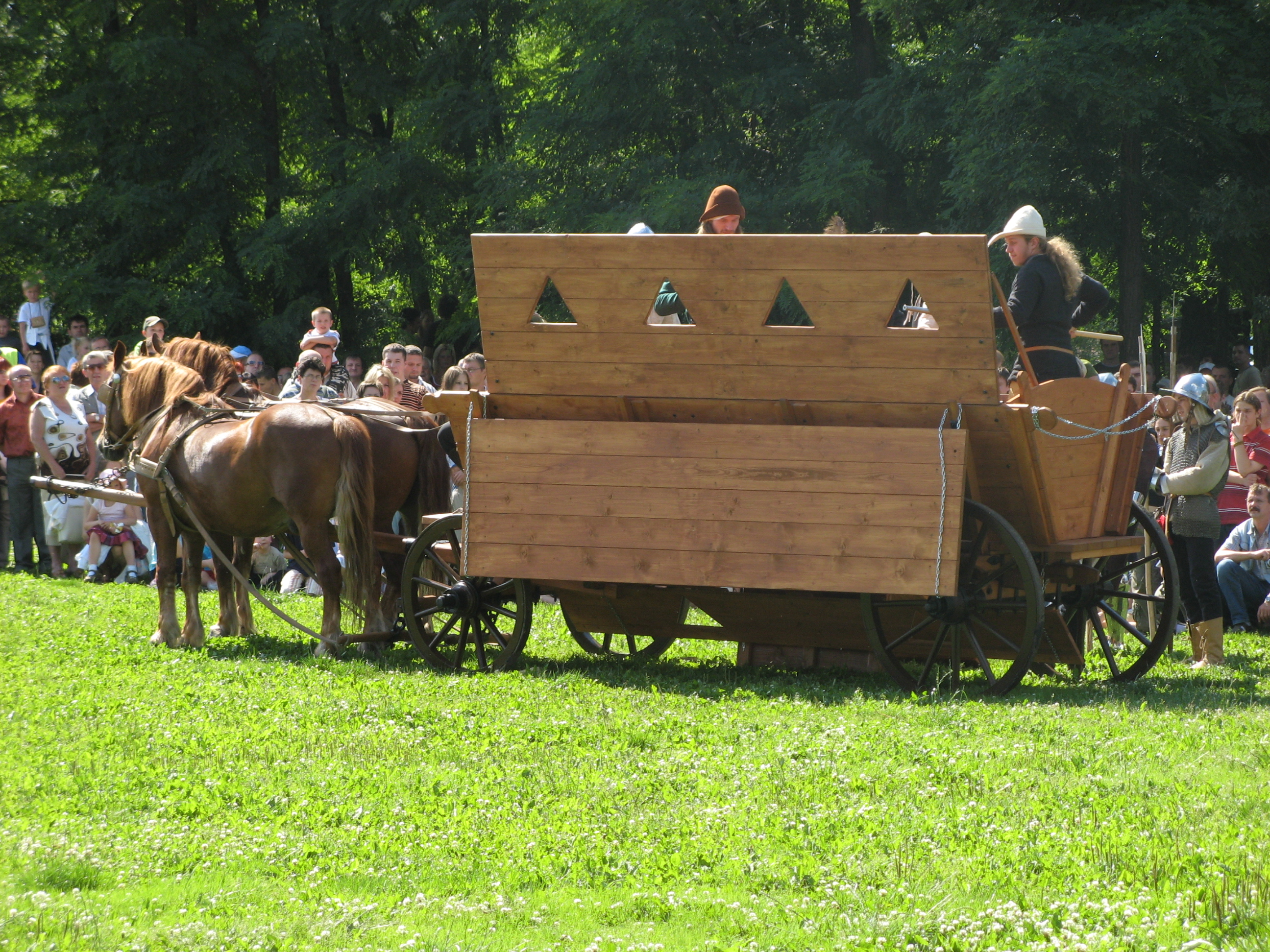
Modern reconstruction of a Hussite war wagon

A war wagon is any of several historical types of early fighting vehicle involving an armed or armored animal-drawn cart or wagon.

== China ==
One of the earliest examples of using conjoined wagons in warfare as fortifications is described in the Chinese historical record Book of Han. During the 119 BC Battle of Mobei of the Han–Xiongnu War, the famous Han general Wei Qing led his army through a fatiguing expeditionary march across the Gobi Desert only to find Yizhixie Chanyu's main force waiting to encircle them on the other side. Heavy armored wagons known as "Military Sturdy Wagon" (Chinese: 武剛車; pinyin: wŭ gāng chē) were deployed in ring formations as temporary defensive fortifications, providing archers, crossbowmen, and infantry protection against the Xiongnu's powerful cavalry charges, and allowing Han troops opportunity to utilize their ranged weapons' advantages of precision. Wei Qing neutralized the Xiongnu's initial cavalry charges, forcing a stalemate and buying time for his troops to recover strength before using the cover of a sandstorm to launch a counteroffensive which overran the nomads.

The Guangwu Emperor (AD 25–57) introduced an ox-drawn war wagon several stories high with an observation tower, which was deployed at the Great Wall against the Xiongnu. By the 6th century such war wagons reached several meters in height and had up to 20 wheels.

== Europe ==
=== Hussites ===
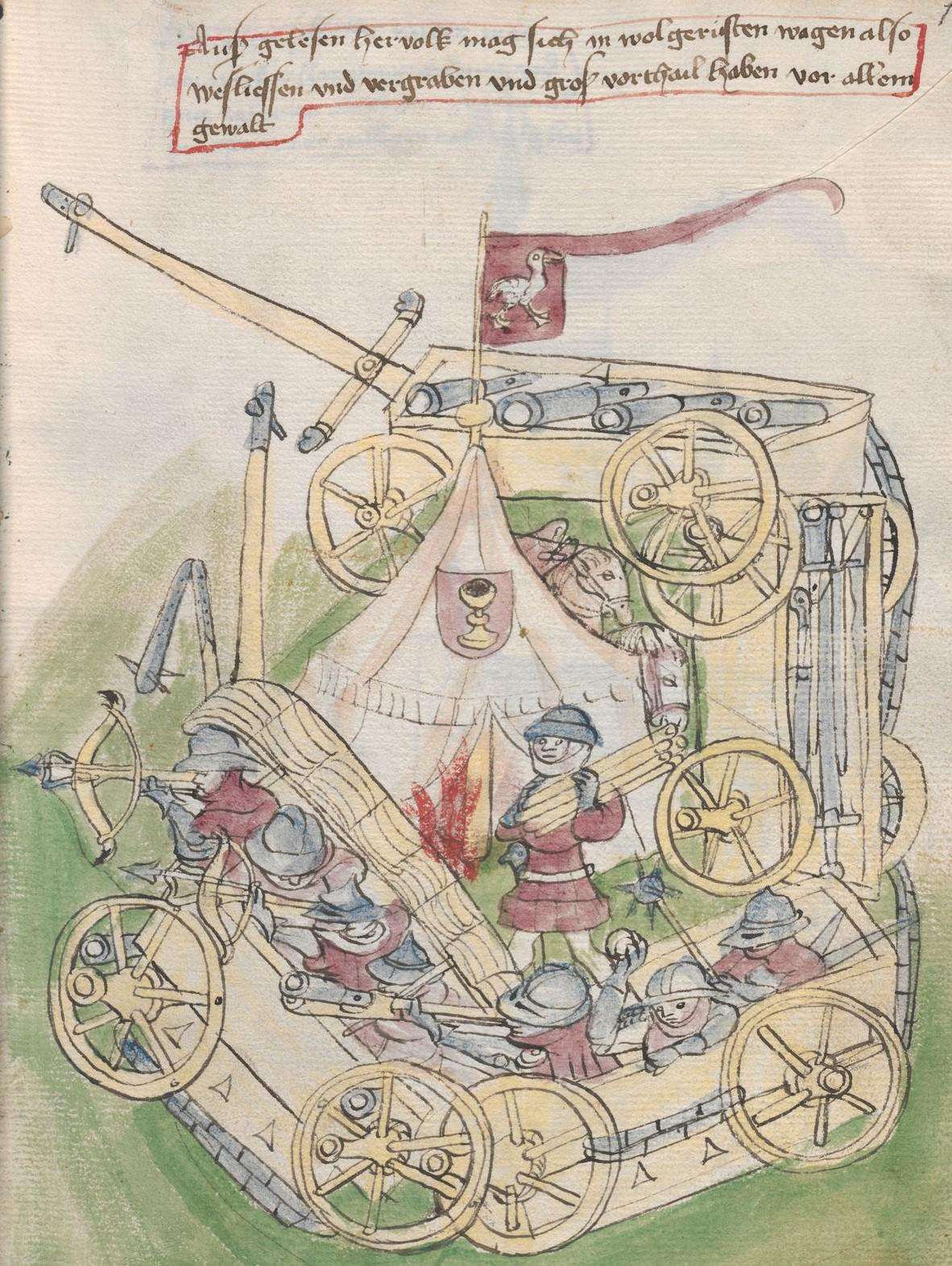
Medieval depiction of the Hussite war wagon, c.1437

A medieval European war wagon was developed in the Hussite Wars around 1420 by Hussite forces led by the Czech general Jan Žižka rebelling in Bohemia. It was a heavy wagon given protective sides with firing slits and heavy firepower from either a cannon or a force of hand-gunners, archers and crossbowmen, supported by infantry using spears, pikes, and flails. Groups of them could form defensive works, but they also were used as hard points for formations or as firepower in pincer movements. This early use of gunpowder and innovative tactics helped a largely peasant infantry stave off attacks by the Holy Roman Empire's larger forces of mounted knights.

The wagon was first used in war in Battle of Sudoměř on March 25, 1420, where it was found to be a powerful weapon for the Hussite army. Despite being outnumbered by approximately 400 to 2000, the war wagon allowed the Hussite forces to emerge victorious in the battle. The wagon was then used throughout the rest of the Hussite Wars with great success.

After the Hussite wars, it stayed in use as the special tactical weapon of Bohemian mercenaries which prevailed against knights or foot soldiers. Its successful history came to an end, at least for large scale engagements, with the development of field-piece artillery: a battle wagon wall "fortress" of approximately 300 wagons was broken at the Battle of Wenzenbach on September 12, 1504 by the culverines and muskets of the landsknecht regiment of Georg von Frundsberg.

War wagons mounting scythe blades and organ guns were used by the Spanish in the battle of Ravenna. They had also been sparsely used in Spain since the 15th century.

=== Zaporozhian Cossacks ===
The Zaporozhian Cossacks were mostly infantry soldiers who used war wagons, according to two early modern authors - Erich Lassota, an important primary source on the Zaporozhian Cossacks from the very end of the 16th century, and Guillaume de Beauplan, a 17th-century cartographer and author of a book describing Ukraine, published in two editions in 1651 and 1660.

== See also ==
- Armoured car (military)
- Armoured personnel carrier
- Carroballista
- Cavalry
- Chariot
- Fire arrow
- Horse artillery
- Laager, tabor (formation)
- Self-propelled artillery
- Tank
- Tachanka
- Wagon
- Wagon fort
- Wagon train
- Zamburak
