= Lipolt Krajíř of Krajek =

Bohemian military leader (d. 1433)

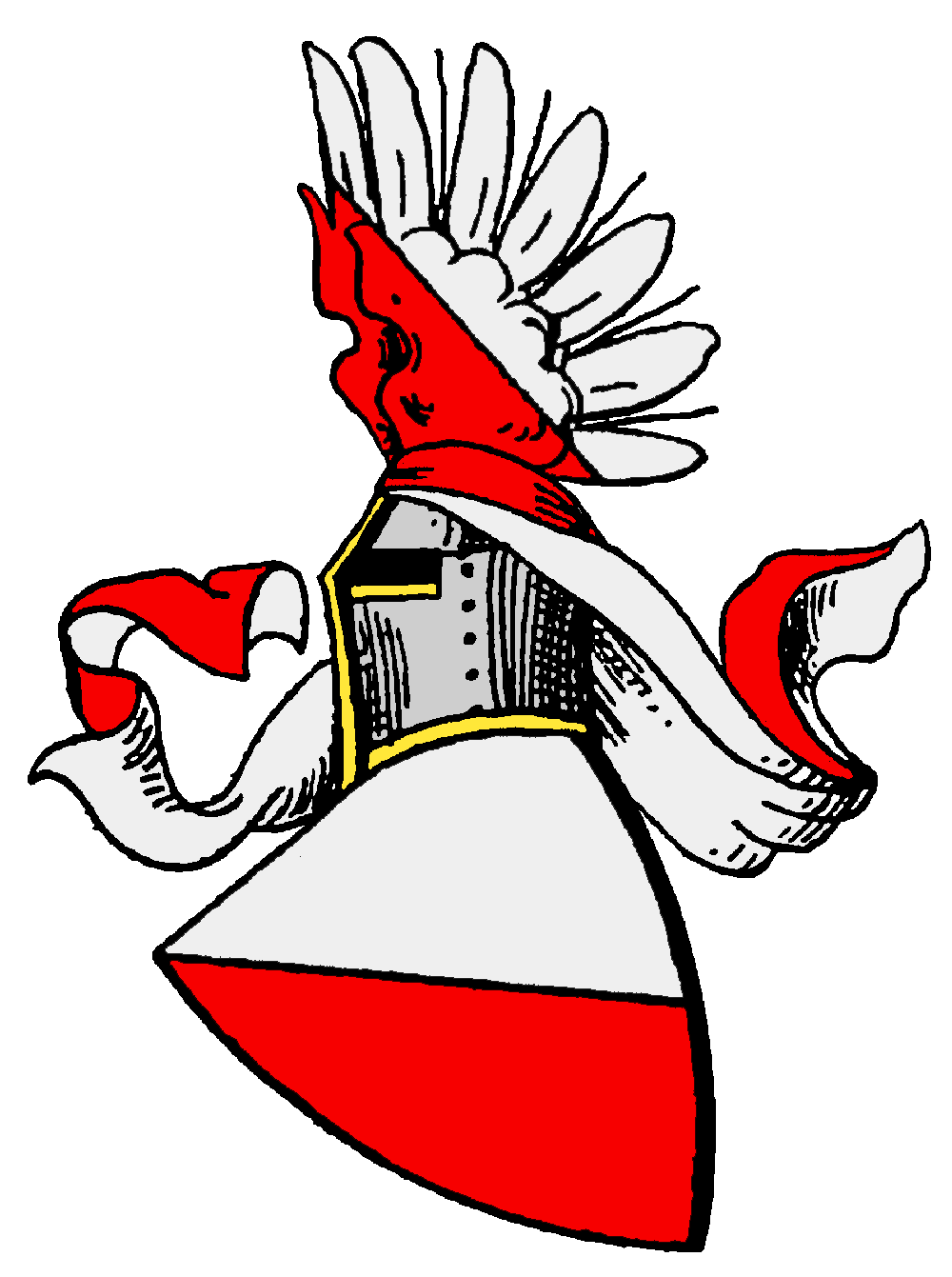
- Coat of arms
- Native name: Lipolt Krajíř z Krajku
- Died: 1433
- Noble family: Krajířové z Krajku
- Father: Konrád II of Krajek

Lipolt Krajíř of Krajek (died 1433) was a Bohemian military leader. In April 1420, he was appointed military governor of České Budějovice by Sigismund of Luxembourg. He played a prominent role in the Hussite Wars against the Taborites, and was known for his conflicts with Oldrich II of Rosenberg.

== Biography ==
Lipolt was born to Konrád II of Krajek and had two brothers; Konrád III and Jan I. His family held estates in Lower Austria, Styria, Carinthia, Moravia, and Bohemia. He is mentioned 1381 as part of the retinue of King Wenceslas IV during a diplomatic trip to England.

Lipolt became one of the premier leaders in the Hussite Wars. Albert II of Germany trusted his experience, and he was granted the highest position of military leadership in 1426. He participated in engagements such as the Battle of Waidhofen and the Battle of Tábor.
