= Battle of Motta (1412) =

Battle of Sigismund's Venetian War

- Part of Sigismund's Venetian war of 1411–1413
Date	August 24, 1412
Location	Motta di Livenza, Veneto
Result	Venetian victory

Belligerents
Republic of Venice	Reign of Sigismund

Commanders and leaders
Carlo Malatesta (WIA); Ruggero Cane Ranieri; Taddeo dal Verme; Pietro Loredan	Pippo Spano; Miklós Marczali †; Niccolò di Prata (POW)

Strength
12,000 troops Assembled on the Livenza by late August	3,000 cavalry Hungarians, Bohemians, Germans and Friulians

Casualties and losses
Heavy; Carlo Malatesta was severely wounded	1,300 killed 400 captured several standards

The Battle of Motta was fought in late August 1412 when an invading army of Hungarians, Germans and Croats led by Pippo Spano and Voivode Miklós Marczali attacked the Venetian positions at Motta in Italy and suffered a heavy defeat.

In 1409, during the 20-year Hungarian civil war between King Sigismund and the Neapolitan house of Anjou, the losing contender, Ladislaus of Naples, sold his "rights" on Dalmatia to the Venetian Republic for 100,000 ducats. As Sigismund emerged as the ruler of Hungary, he used this as a pretext to attack Venice.

The victory allowed Venice to affirm its rule in the Western Balkans (Venetian Dalmatia and Venetian Albania) against the plans of Sigismund, King of Germany, Hungary and Croatia.

== Prelude ==
The Republic of Venice subjugated Verona and Vicenza after the death of Gian Galeazzo Visconti, and took control of Padua by having its count, Francesco Carrara, executed in Venice. This, and the Republics refusal to pay the annual fee of 7,000 ducats to the Crown of Hungary drove Sigismund, king of Hungary to declare war upon Venice.
On April 20, 1411, 12,000 Hungarian cavalry and 8,000 foot crossed the Tagliamento under Pipo of Ozora. The initial Hungarian success and the heavy losses that the Venetians sustained forced the Republic into a peace negotiation (March 24, 1412) in which King Sigismund demanded the city of Zadar, reinstatement of the Scaliger and Carraresi to their fiefdoms and a reparation of 600,000 ducats. This proposition was not accepted by the Republic of Venice and the war was resumed by both sides with great passion.

== Battle ==
The Venetians increased their army and at the head of 35,000 men, Carlo Malatesta reentered the field in Friuli conquering the castles of Polcenigo and Aviano. Pandolfo Malatesta, brother of Carlo, joined the Venetian force with 1,000 lances and by late August, the Venetians had an army of 12,000 men assembled along the Livenza river, with Carlo Malatesta laying siege to Motta.

On August 24, 3,000 Hungarians (including Germans, Friulians and Bohemians) under Pippo Spano assaulted the Venetian camp from three sides. The Venetians were taken by surprise and the Hungarians started a slaughter and began to plunder what they could. Only Carlo Malatesta and the other Venetian generals, together with Ruggero Cane Ranieri and his company of 600 horsemen, held off the Hungarians. The Venetian fortunes completely changed when Pietro Loredan burned the bridges, so that the fleeing Venetian troops could not escape, and thus rallied them back into combat. In the fierce encounter the Hungarians were driven off, with the loss of over 1,300 men and their general killed, several standards and 400 men captured.

The Venetians won a hard fought victory, having lost a lot of men killed.

== Aftermath ==
After being severely wounded, Carlo Malatesta, was forced to surrender his command over the Venetian troops to his brother Pandolfo. Motta was forced to surrender after Pietro Loredan and Martino da Faenza bombarded it, killing 60 and capturing 200 Hungarians. In October, King Sigismund arrived in person with a force of 40,000 men, but continued the war with little success. After the failed siege of Vicenza, which decimated the Hungarian force, a truce for five years with exchange of prisoners was finally concluded on April 17, 1413.
