= Battle of Sudoměř =

1420 battle of the Hussite Wars

Coordinates: 49°14′31″N 14°3′50″E

- Part of the Hussite Wars
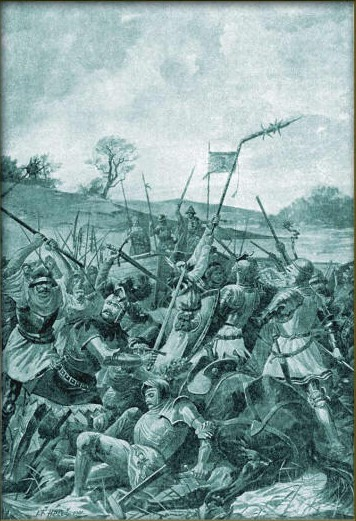
- The Battle of Sudoměř by Ferdinand Hetteš
Date	25 March 1420
Location	Sudoměř, southern Bohemia
Result	Hussite victory

Belligerents
Landfrieden of Plzeň knightly retinue of nobles called themselves "Iron Lords"; Order of St. John (Strakonice Commandery)	Hussites of Plzeň; Taborites

Commanders and leaders
Bohuslav of Schwanberg; Jindřich of Hradec (DOW); Petr Konopišťský of Šternberk; Mikeš Divůček of Jemniště; Hanuš of Kolowrat	Břeněk Švihovský of Dolany †; Jan Žižka; Valkoun of Adlar

Strength
2,000 cavalry	400 infantry 12 war wagons 9 cavalrymen

Casualties and losses
Heavy	Heavy, at least 3 wagons destroyed 30 captured

The Battle of Sudoměř was fought on 25 March 1420, between Catholic and Hussite forces. The Hussites were led by Břeněk of Švihov, who was killed in battle, and Jan Žižka, whose forces proved victorious. This was the second major battle of the Hussite Wars; the first battle, the Battle of Nekmíř, was more of a Hussite retreat than a true fight.

== Process ==
The Battle of Sudoměř began after Hussite forces, which had taken up temporary fortifications on the plains, were found by Royalist forces, who closed in for an attack. The Hussites were greatly outnumbered almost 5-to-1, and initially hoisted the white flag, but when the Royalists refused to accept their surrender, the battle truly began.

Though outnumbered and comparatively ill-equipped, facing heavily armoured knights, the Hussites had fortified their surroundings ingeniously. Their flank was protected by war wagons loaded with arquebusiers, and many large ponds and marshy areas surrounded the Hussite infantry—ground which the Royalist cavalry could not hope to cross.

Three hundred Knights Hospitaller from Strakonice led by Jindřich of Hradec (killed in battle) attacked war wagons placed on a slim dam, with huge casualties but no success. After that, another four hundred Royalist cavalrymen, led by Petr Konopišťský of Šternberk (killed in the Battle of Vítkov Hill later that year) rushed a weakly held side of the Hussite formation, but were mired in marshy ground. They dismounted in order to progress, but soon found themselves mired once more. Following this, the Hussite light infantry equipped with flails were able to easily finish the cavalrymen.

The battle ended with the advance of night and fog, during which Žižka and the Hussite forces were able to escape. Though the Catholic Royalists were not entirely defeated, the fact the Hussites were able to inflict such heavy casualties with so few men, and then escape soundly, proved to be a great victory. Only 400 hussites (farmers and townsmen, including women and children) beat the 2,000-strong force of heavily armoured cavalry. Hussite General, Jan Žižka, through superior knowledge of tactics and terrain, along with the highly effective deployment of wagon fort strategies, won the day.
