= Sudoměř =

- Municipality
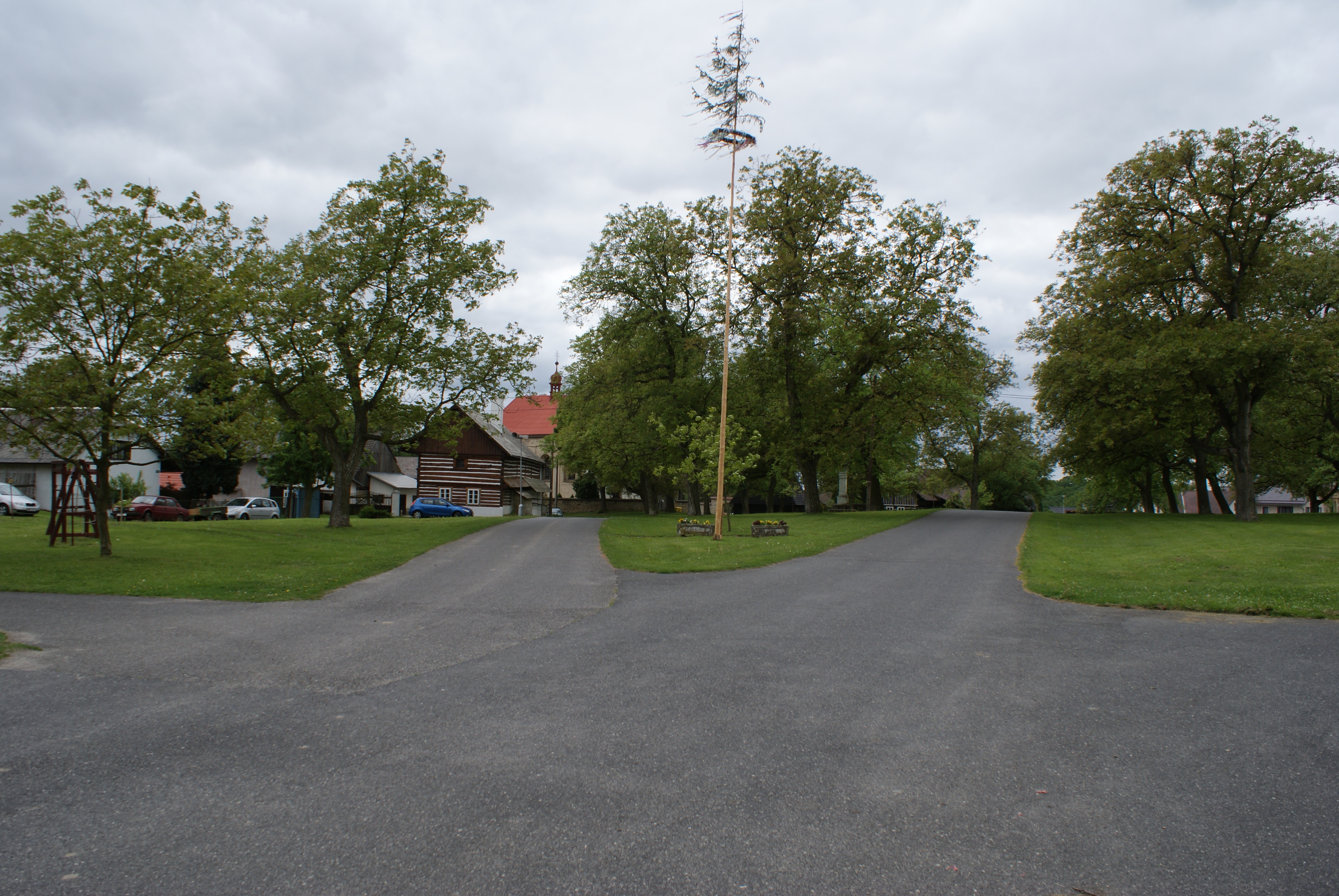
- Centre of Sudoměř

- Flag Coat of arms

- Location in the Czech Republic
- Coordinates: 50°26′42″N 14°44′22″E
- Country: Czech Republic
- Region: Central Bohemian
- District: Mladá Boleslav
- First mentioned: 1348

Area
  - Total: 6.13 km^{2} (2.37 sq mi)
- Elevation: 311 m (1,020 ft)

Population (2026-01-01)
  - Total: 102
  - Density: 16.6/km^{2} (43.1/sq mi)
- Time zone: UTC+1 (CET)
  - Summer (DST): UTC+2 (CEST)
- Postal code: 294 25
- Website: www.sudomer.cz

Sudoměř is a municipality and village in Mladá Boleslav District in the Central Bohemian Region of the Czech Republic. It has about 100 inhabitants.

== Demographics ==
Historical population
| Year | Pop. | ±% |
|---|---|---|
| 1869 | 224 | — |
| 1880 | 207 | −7.6% |
| 1890 | 239 | +15.5% |
| 1900 | 247 | +3.3% |
| 1910 | 278 | +12.6% |
| 1921 | 284 | +2.2% |
| 1930 | 281 | −1.1% |
| 1950 | 172 | −38.8% |
| 1961 | 169 | −1.7% |
| 1970 | 142 | −16.0% |
| 1980 | 116 | −18.3% |
| 1991 | 88 | −24.1% |
| 2001 | 77 | −12.5% |
| 2011 | 86 | +11.7% |
| 2021 | 99 | +15.1% |
Source: Censuses
