= Tang Sai'er =

Chinese White Lotus rebel leader

Tang Sai'er (Chinese: 唐賽兒; fl. 1420) was a Chinese White Lotus female rebel leader during the Wanli reign of the Ming dynasty.

She was the daughter of a martial art master in Putai, married Lin San and joined the White Lotus. In 1420, she used the discontent among the peasantry to gather a rebel army against the Imperial government at Xieshipeng. She took the cities Ju and Jimo and defeated several Imperial officials before her army was defeated at Anqiu. After the defeat, she and her rebels mixed with the sympathetic peasantry and disappeared and were therefore never punished. She remained a popular heroine in folk legend and the village Xieshipeng was named after her.

Tang is the protagonist of the Qing dynasty novel History of Female Immortals written by Lu Xiong, depicted as a reincarnation of Chang'e and disciple of Jiutian Xuannü and Daode Tianzun. She was given the heavenly book of Jiutian Xuannu like Song Jiang. Whenever it is a critical moment, Jiutian Xuannu always helps Tang Saier to solve trouble.
