= Křeč =

- Municipality
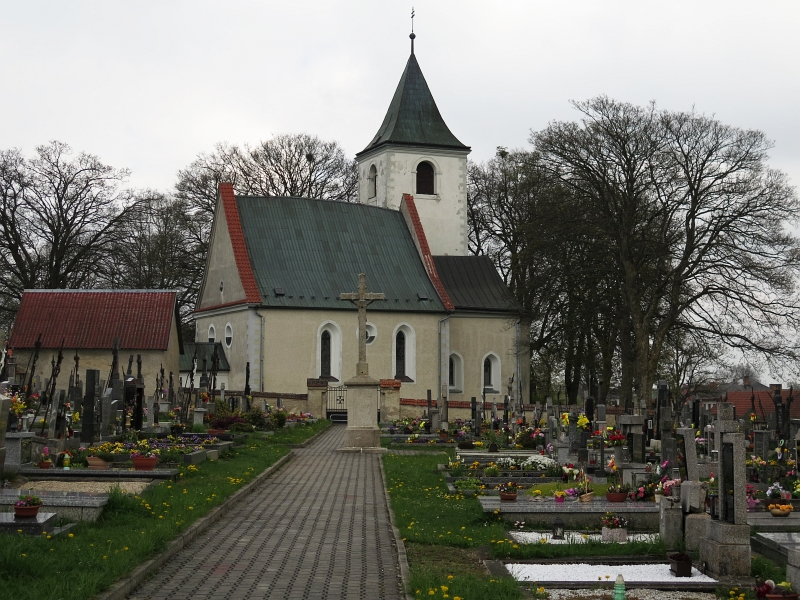
- Church of Saint James the Great

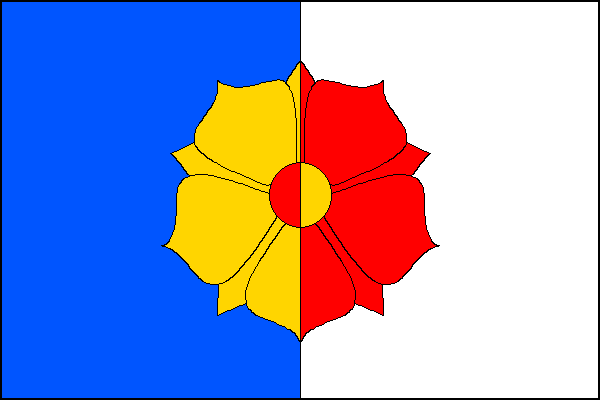
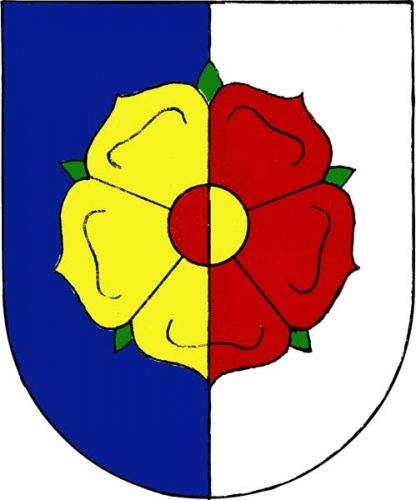
- Flag Coat of arms

- Location in the Czech Republic
- Coordinates: 49°23′22″N 14°55′1″E
- Country: Czech Republic
- Region: Vysočina
- District: Pelhřimov
- First mentioned: 1358

Area
  - Total: 10.41 km^{2} (4.02 sq mi)
- Elevation: 645 m (2,116 ft)

Population (2026-01-01)
  - Total: 232
  - Density: 22.3/km^{2} (57.7/sq mi)
- Time zone: UTC+1 (CET)
  - Summer (DST): UTC+2 (CEST)
- Postal code: 394 95
- Website: www.obeckrec.cz

Křeč is a municipality and village in Pelhřimov District in the Vysočina Region of the Czech Republic. It has about 200 inhabitants.

== Etymology ==
The origin of the name is uncertain. The name may be derived from the Proto-Slavic word krk (meaning 'stump') and originated as a designation of a place where trees were cut down so that a settlement could be established, or from the personal names Křeč or Křek.

== Geography ==
Křeč is located about 22 kilometres (14 mi) west of Pelhřimov and 47 km (29 mi) west of Jihlava. It lies in the Křemešník Highlands. The highest point is at 670 m (2,200 ft) above sea level. The Javornička Stream originates in the centre of the village and supplies there a system of several small fishponds.

== History ==
The first written mention of Křeč is from 1358. The area was probably inhabited already in the 12th century, but it is not known when the village was founded. In 1435, the Battle of Křeč took place here, the last battle of the Hussite Wars.

== Demographics ==
Historical population

Year	Pop.	±%
1869	735	—
1880	687	−6.5%
1890	703	+2.3%
1900	610	−13.2%
1910	568	−6.9%

Year	Pop.	±%
1921	612	+7.7%
1930	525	−14.2%
1950	390	−25.7%
1961	367	−5.9%
1970	327	−10.9%

Year	Pop.	±%
1980	313	−4.3%
1991	249	−20.4%
2001	247	−0.8%
2011	231	−6.5%
2021	229	−0.9%

Source: Censuses

== Transport ==
The Jindřichův Hradec narrow-gauge railway, leading from Jindřichův Hradec to Obrataň, runs through the eastern part of the municipality. The train station Křeč is located just outside the municipal territory. The railway serves mostly as a tourist attraction.

== Sights ==
The main landmark of Křeč is the Church of Saint James the Great. It is a valuable Gothic building with a Romanesque core.
