= Čejetice =

- Municipality
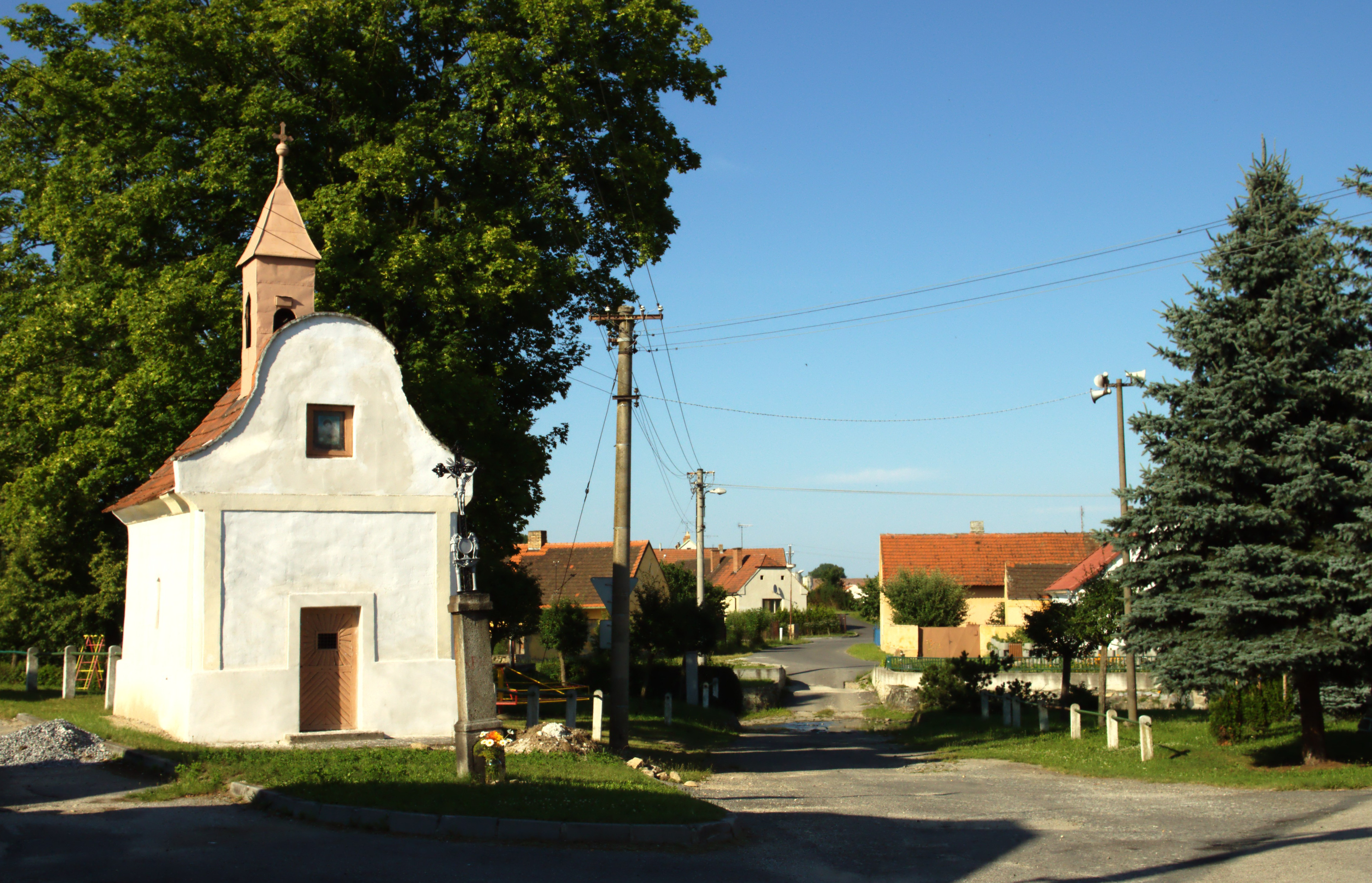
- Common in Čejetice

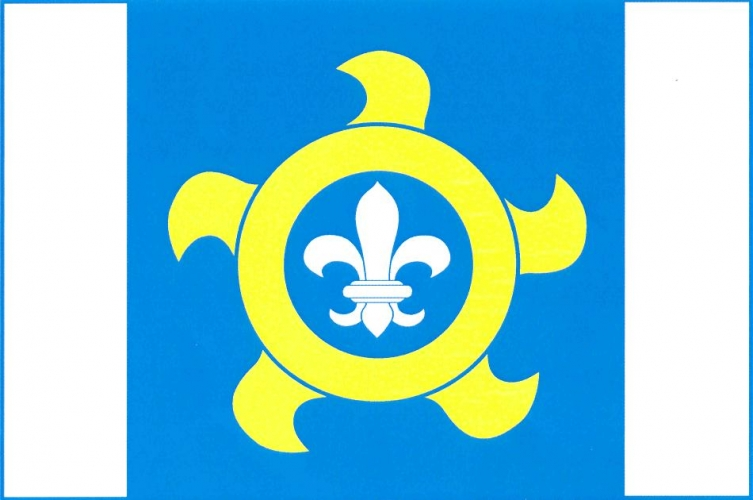
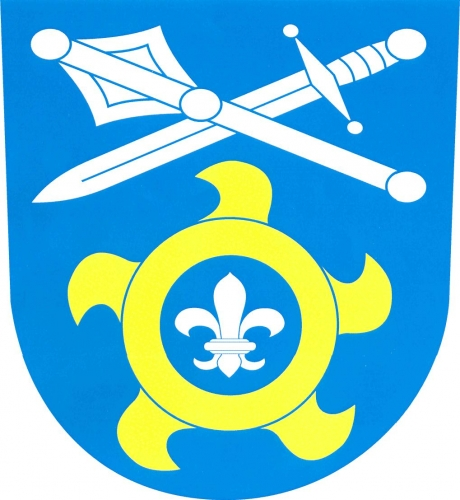
- Flag Coat of arms

- Location in the Czech Republic
- Coordinates: 49°15′10″N 14°1′13″E
- Country: Czech Republic
- Region: South Bohemian
- District: Strakonice
- First mentioned: 1289

Area
  - Total: 21.04 km^{2} (8.12 sq mi)
- Elevation: 377 m (1,237 ft)

Population (2026-01-01)
  - Total: 946
  - Density: 45.0/km^{2} (116/sq mi)
- Time zone: UTC+1 (CET)
  - Summer (DST): UTC+2 (CEST)
- Postal code: 386 01
- Website: www.obec-cejetice.cz

Čejetice is a municipality and village in Strakonice District in the South Bohemian Region of the Czech Republic. It has about 900 inhabitants.

== Administrative division ==
Čejetice consists of five municipal parts (in brackets population according to the 2021 census):

- Čejetice (607)
- Mladějovice (165)
- Sedlíkovice (36)
- Sedliště (19)
- Sudoměř (94)

== Etymology ==
The name is derived from the personal name Čajata, meaning "the village of Čajata's people".

== Geography ==
Čejetice is located about 8 kilometres (5 mi) east of Strakonice and 44 km (27 mi) northwest of České Budějovice. It lies in the České Budějovice Basin. The highest point is the hill Virotín at 497 metres (1,631 ft) above sea level. The municipal territory is very rich in fishponds, the establishment of which has a long history here.

== History ==
The first written mention of Čejetice is from 1289.

Sudoměř is known for the Battle of Sudoměř, which took place between the ponds Škaredý and Markovec during the Hussite Wars in 1420.

== Demographics ==
Historical population

Year	Pop.	±%
1869	1,267	—
1880	1,420	+12.1%
1890	1,395	−1.8%
1900	1,361	−2.4%
1910	1,356	−0.4%

Year	Pop.	±%
1921	1,358	+0.1%
1930	1,295	−4.6%
1950	1,116	−13.8%
1961	1,073	−3.9%
1970	933	−13.0%

Year	Pop.	±%
1980	896	−4.0%
1991	866	−3.3%
2001	854	−1.4%
2011	874	+2.3%
2021	921	+5.4%

Source: Censuses

== Transport ==
Čejetice is located on the railway line České Budějovice–Strakonice. The municipality is served by two train stations: Čejetice and Sudoměř u Písku.

== Sights ==
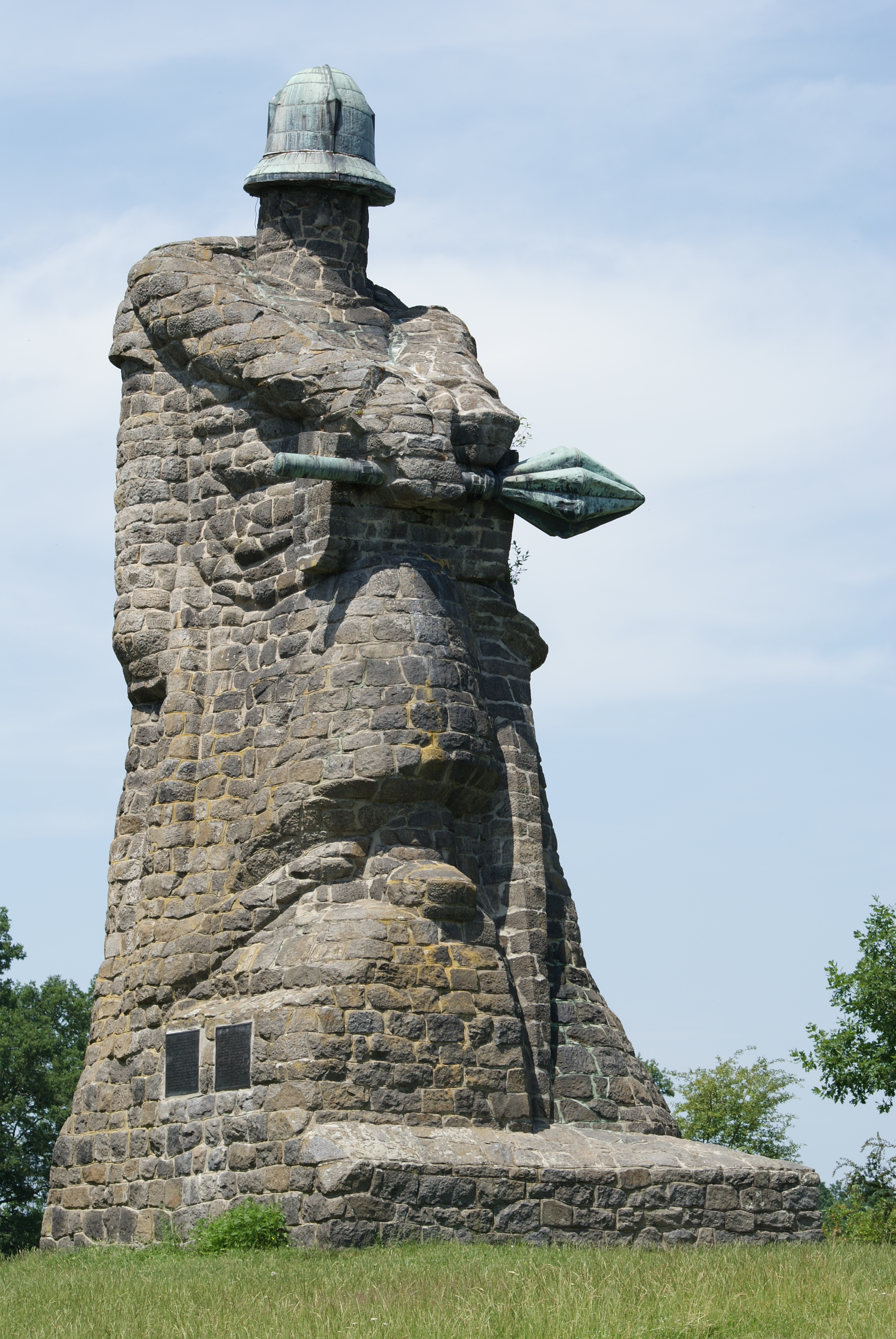
Memorial to Battle of Sudoměř

The main landmark of Čejetice is the Church of Saint Gall. It was originally an early Gothic church from the second half of the 13th century. At the end of the 17th century, it was rebuilt in the Baroque style.

There is the Memorial to Battle of Sudoměř, which is a 16 metres (52 ft) tall stone statue of Jan Žižka. It was created in 1925.

== Twin towns – sister cities ==
Čejetice is twinned with:

- Oberwil im Simmental, Switzerland
