= Malý Bor =

- Municipality
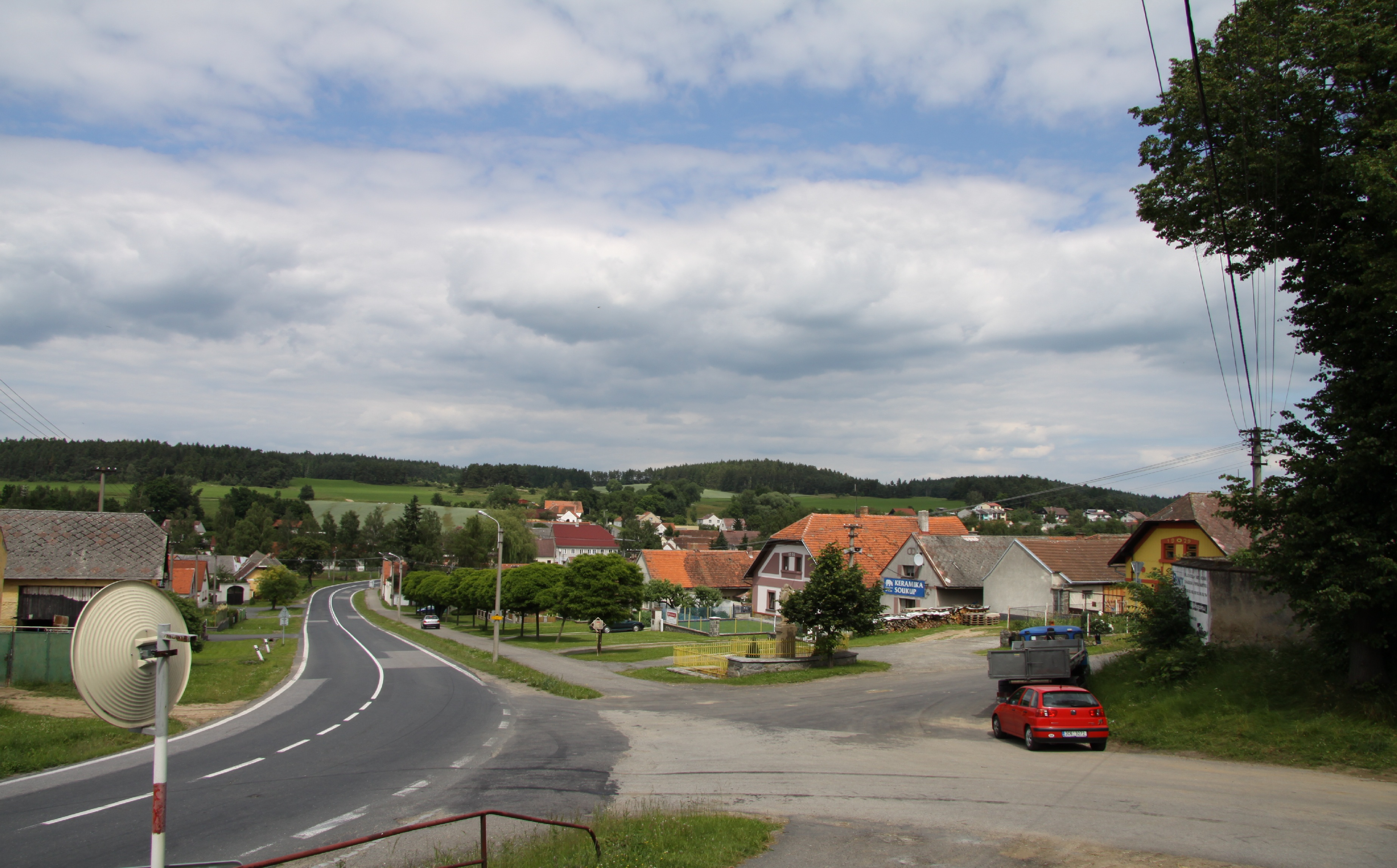
- General view

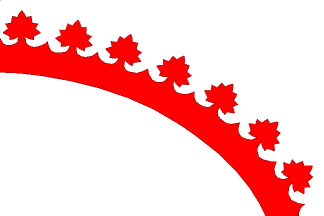
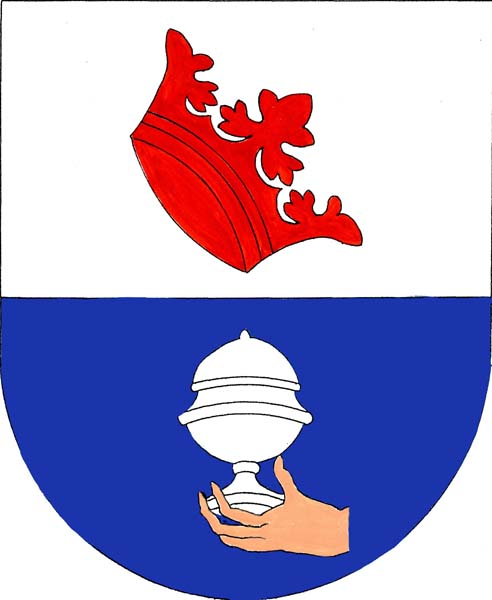
- Flag Coat of arms

- Location in the Czech Republic
- Coordinates: 49°19′50″N 13°39′8″E
- Country: Czech Republic
- Region: Plzeň
- District: Klatovy
- First mentioned: 1243

Area
  - Total: 15.07 km^{2} (5.82 sq mi)
- Elevation: 442 m (1,450 ft)

Population (2026-01-01)
  - Total: 494
  - Density: 32.8/km^{2} (84.9/sq mi)
- Time zone: UTC+1 (CET)
  - Summer (DST): UTC+2 (CEST)
- Postal code: 341 01
- Website: www.maly-bor.cz

Malý Bor is a municipality and village in Klatovy District in the Plzeň Region of the Czech Republic. It has about 500 inhabitants.

Malý Bor lies approximately 27 kilometres (17 mi) east of Klatovy, 51 km (32 mi) south-east of Plzeň, and 102 km (63 mi) south-west of Prague.

== Administrative division ==
Malý Bor consists of four municipal parts (in brackets population according to the 2021 census):

- Malý Bor (293)
- Hliněný Újezd (28)
- Malé Hydčice (9)
- Týnec (150)

== Demographics ==
Historical population
Year	Pop.	±%
1869	1,184	—
1880	1,212	+2.4%
1890	1,183	−2.4%
1900	1,123	−5.1%
1910	1,076	−4.2%
1921	1,061	−1.4%
1930	949	−10.6%
1950	749	−21.1%
1961	761	+1.6%
1970	668	−12.2%
1980	603	−9.7%
1991	573	−5.0%
2001	583	+1.7%
2011	539	−7.5%
2021	480	−10.9%
Source: Censuses
