= Charles Louis Philippot =

French artist

- Born: 1 October 1801; Sainte-Menehould, France
- Died: 31 December 1859 (aged 58); Český Krumlov, Austrian Empire

Charles Louis Philippot, also known as Karl Ludwig Philippot, (English: /fɪˈlɪpoʊ/ fil-ih-POH, French: [ʃaʁl lwi filipɔ]; 1 October 1801 – 31 December 1859) was a French artist who primarily worked in Český Krumlov.

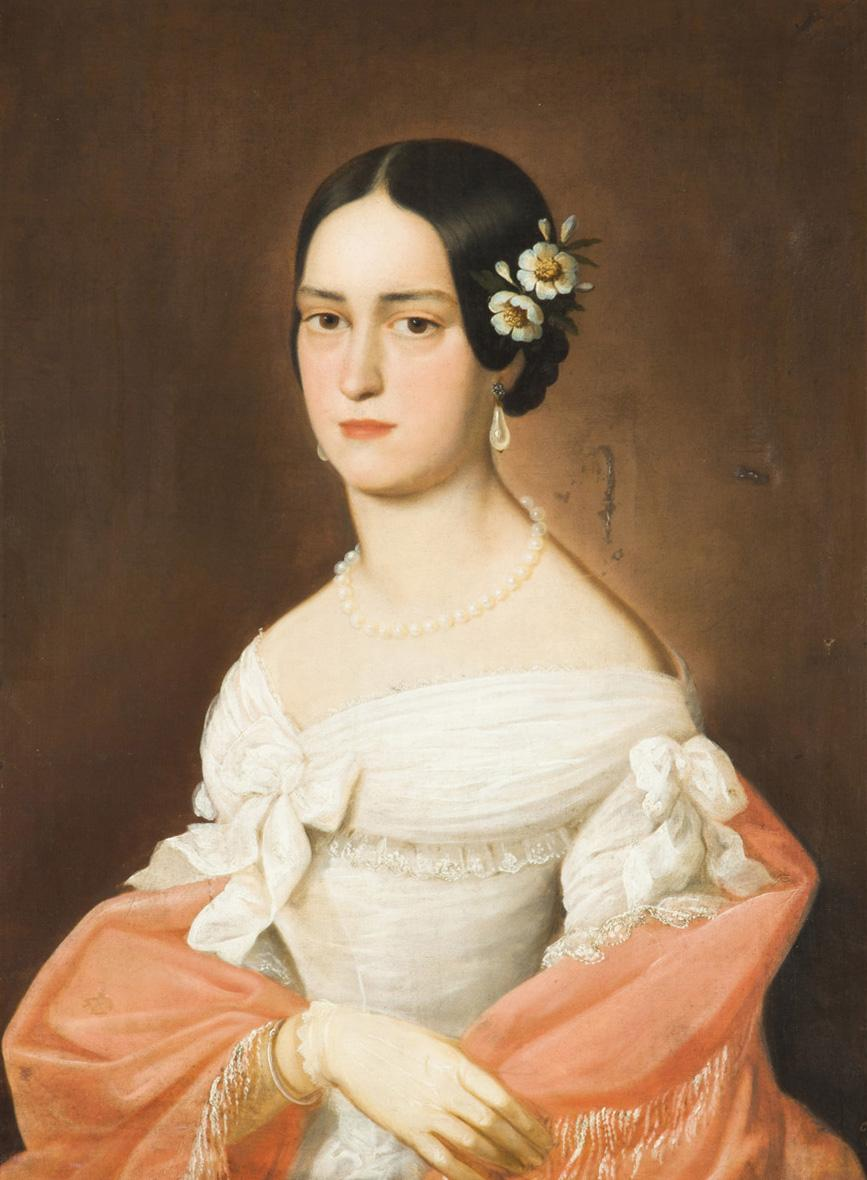
Portrait of a young lady (1847)

Philippot was born in Sainte-Menehould, France. In 1833, he set up a studio in Linz. He remained in Linz until 1839, when he became the Court Painter to Prince Schwarzenberg at Český Krumlov. During his service to the House of Schwarzenberg, he painted portraits of many prominent members of the Rosenberg family, Eggenberg family, and Schwarzenberg family. He also painted the altarpieces in the chapel of Český Krumlov Castle.

He died in Český Krumlov on 31 December 1859.
