= Battle of Vítkov Hill =

1420 battle in Prague

- Part of the First anti-Hussite crusade, Hussite Wars
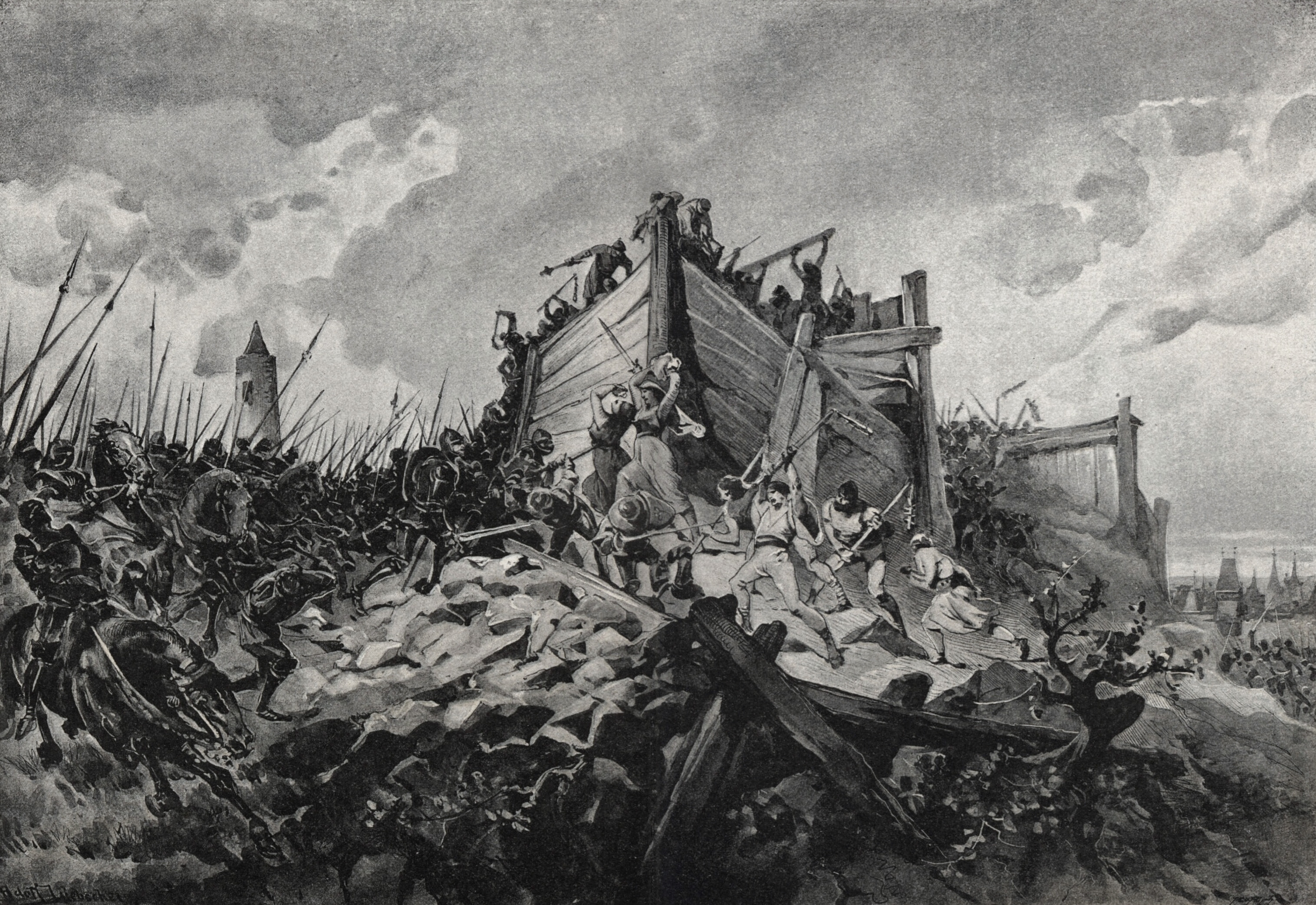
- Late 19th-century depiction of the conflict by Czech artist Adolf Liebscher
Date	12 June – 14 July 1420
Location	Vítkov Hill (outside Prague, Czech Republic) 50.0888°N 14.4514°E
Result	Hussite victory

Belligerents
Crusaders; Holy Roman Empire and Kingdom of Germany; Margravate of Meissen; Duchy of Austria; Margraviate of Moravia; Kingdom of Hungary; Rebels	Hussite coalition; Taborites; Praguers; Union of Žatec and Louny

Commanders and leaders
Sigismund; Heinrich of Isenburg †; Pippo Spano; Oldřich of Boskovice	Jan Žižka

Strength
~7,000–8,000 cavalry	At Vitkov Hill: ~80 soldiers under Žižka Reinforcements from Prague: ~50 bowmen Unknown number of infantry, including axemen and flailmen

Casualties and losses
~400–500 killed	2–3 killed (traditionally)

The Battle of Vítkov Hill was a part of the Hussite Wars. The battle pitted the forces of King Sigismund, against Hussite forces under command of Jan Žižka (English: John Zizka). Vítkov Hill was located on the edge of the city of Prague and the battle occurred in a vineyard established by Sigismund's father, Charles IV. It ended with a decisive Hussite victory.

== Background ==
On 1 March 1420 Pope Martin V published a papal bull in which he ordered that Sigismund and all Eastern princes had to organize a crusade against the Hussite followers of Jan Hus, John Wycliffe and other heretics. On 15 March in Breslau, Emperor Sigismund ordered the execution of Jan Krása, a Hussite and leader of the Wrocław Uprising in 1418. On 17 March, the papal legate Ferdinand de Palacios published the bull in Wrocław. The Utraquist faction of Hussites then understood that they would not reach an agreement with him and decided to unite with Taborite Hussites to defend against the emperor.

The crusaders assembled their army in Schweidnitz. On 4 April, Taborite forces destroyed Catholic forces in Mladá Vožice. On 7 April, Taborites, commanded by Nicholas of Hus, captured Sedlice, and they later captured Písek, Rábí Castle, Strakonice and Prachatice. In late April, the crusading army crossed the Bohemian border. In early May, they captured Hradec Králové. On 7 May Čeněk of Wartenberg surrounded Hradčany.

=== Battles in Benešov and near Kutná Hora ===
The Crusader force of 400 infantry and knights, commanded by Peter of Sternberg, attempted to defend Benešov from the Taborites. After the battle, the crusader forces were destroyed, and the town was burned. Near Kutná Hora, the crusader forces, commanded by Janek z Chtěnic and Pippo Spano (Filippo Scolari), attacked the formations of the Taborites, without success.

On 22 May, the Taborite forces entered Prague. Jan Žižka destroyed the crusaders' relief column, which had to secure supplies that were sent to Hradčany and Vyšehrad. Meanwhile, the crusading army captured Slaný, Louny and Mělník.

== Battle ==
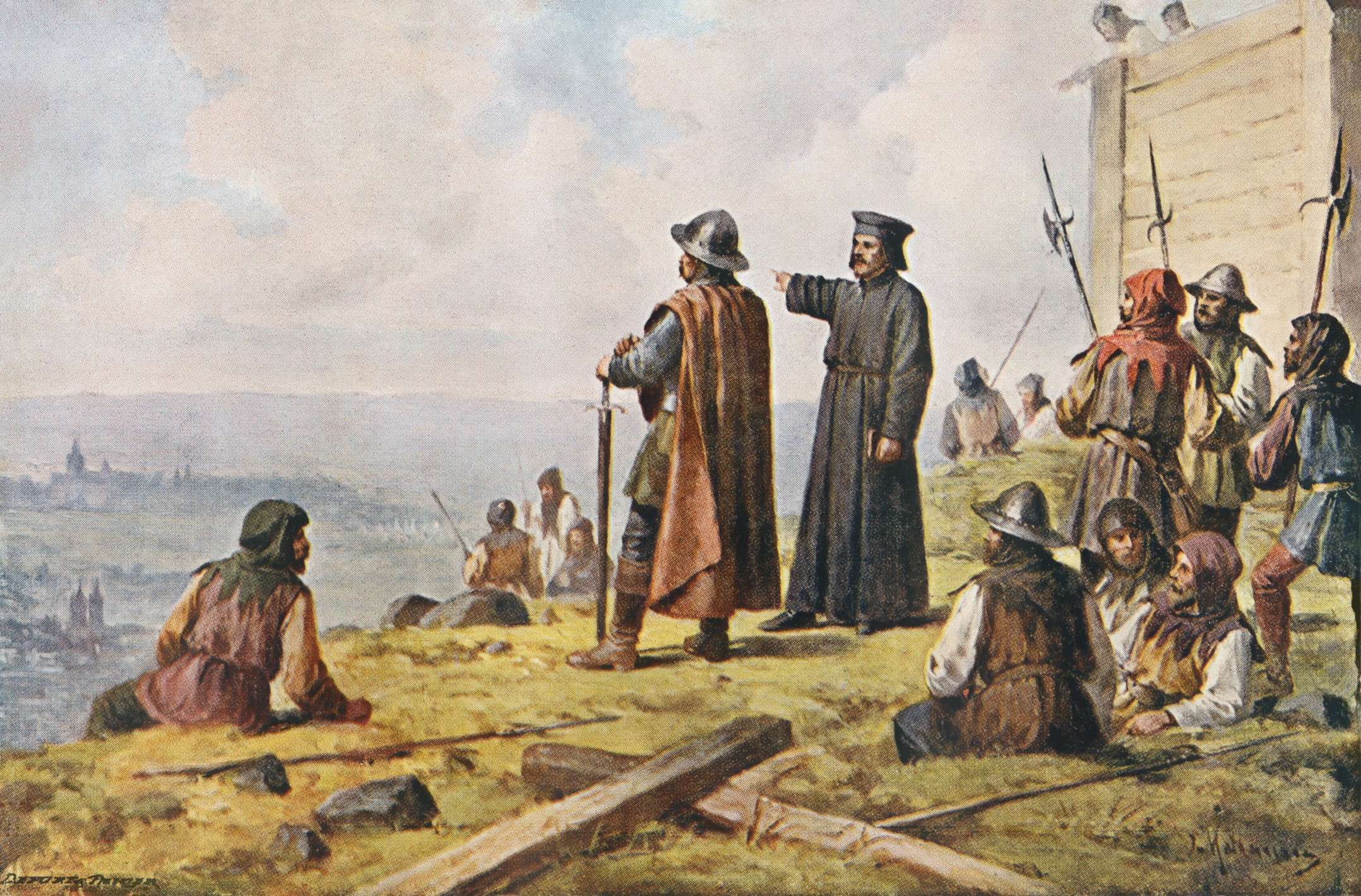
Late 19th-century illustration of Jan Žižka with a priest looking over Prague at the Vítkov Hill.

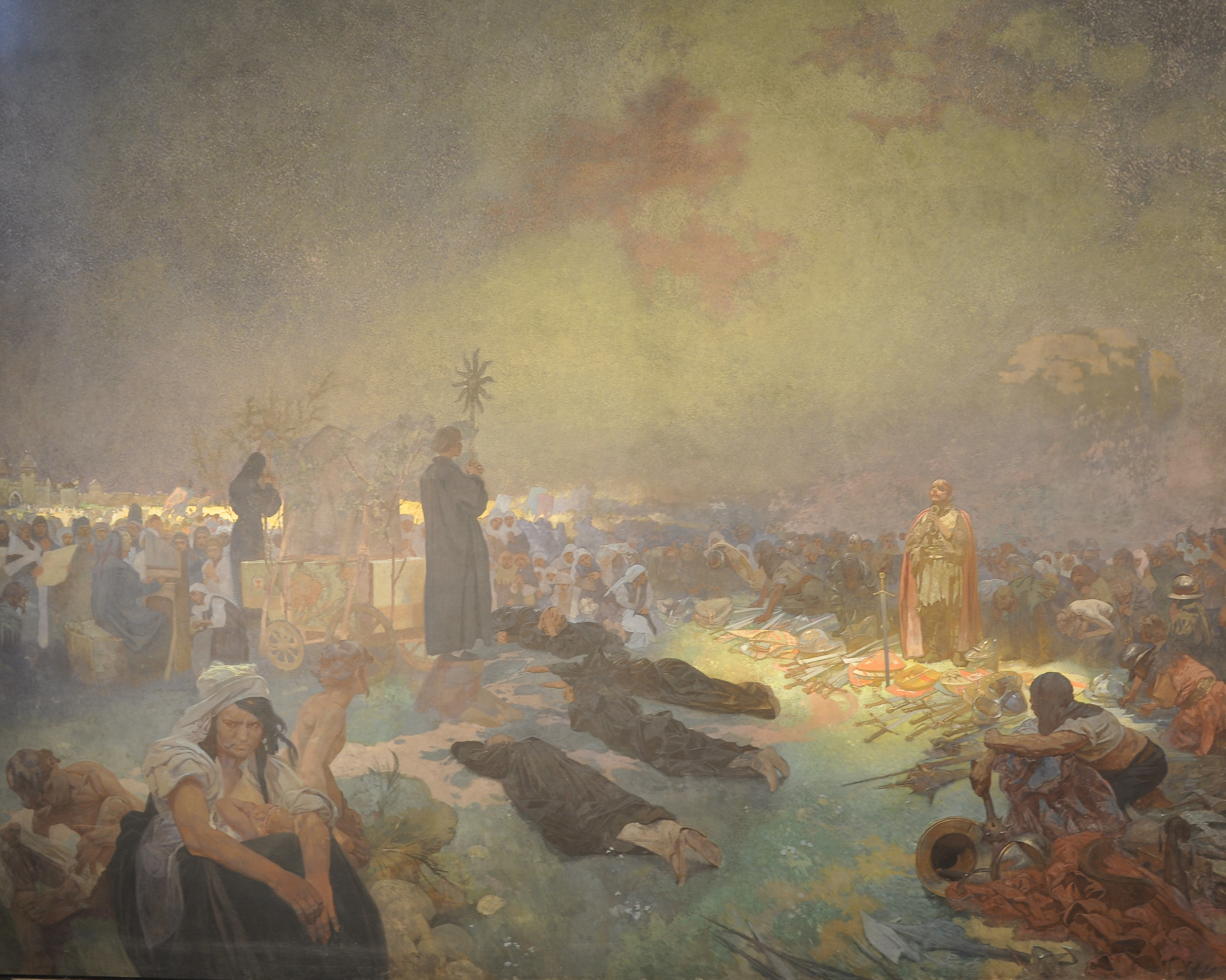
After the Battle of Vítkov Hill (1923), by Alphonse Mucha, The Slav Epic

The siege of Prague began on 12 June. The crusaders' forces were reported contemporaneously by chroniclers to number 100,000–200,000 soldiers, but according to modern historian Victor Verney, it was significantly fewer, probably only about 8,000 soldiers. When the crusaders approached the city, they knew a direct attack on the walls would be disastrous, so they planned to encircle it. To do so, all of the fortifications around Prague needed to be destroyed or occupied. The crusaders committed most of their forces to these raids in an attempt to prevent the defenders at key points from being reinforced by the Prague garrison.

=== Vítkov Hill ===
One of the most important of the fortifications surrounding Prague was Vítkov Hill, which dominated the area east of Prague and overlooked roads needed for the crusaders' supply lines. The fortifications on the hill were made primarily from timber, with the walls reinforced with stone and clay and moats dug around the base of the hill. On the southern part of the hill was a free-standing tower made from timber, and the remaining northern flank was covered by a steep cliff. Traditionally, the fortifications were said to be defended by Žižka with only 26 men and 3 women under his command, but it was probably higher (60 or more soldiers, according to J. Durdik) and it is unclear if Žižka was on the hill. The men on the hill were armed mostly with guns and flails.

On 13 July, the crusaders' cavalry crossed the river Vltava and began their attack on the outer ring of fortifications. Vítkov Hill was attacked by a detachment of Austrian and Meissen cavalry under Heinrich of Isenburg, governor of Meissen. An hour before sunset, the horsemen advanced from the south towards the hill, but the terrain and fortifications of the hill forced them down a narrow path and prevented them from utilizing their greater numbers. The tenacity of the defenders held the attackers off for some time, but the heavily outnumbered Hussites were slowly pushed back. Shortly thereafter, reinforcements from the garrison of the New Town broke off and headed towards Vítkov Hill, outflanking the knights and attacking through the vineyards on the southern slope. Trapped between the counter-attack and the steep cliff on the northern slope, the crusaders quickly panicked as they were forced off the hill. As they retreated, many knights drowned in the Vltava.

The battle was a clear victory for the Hussites. The crusaders lost between 400 and 500 knights. In honour of the battle, Vítkov Hill was renamed Žižkov after Jan Žižka. As a consequence of the Hussite victory on Vítkov, the crusaders lost any hope of starving the city into submission, and their army disintegrated. The National Monument still exists on the hill, and in 2003, local officials were attempting to replant the vineyard.

Sigismund and his troops then held the castles of Vyšehrad and Hradčany. However, they soon capitulated, and Sigismund had to withdraw from Prague. The crusaders later withdrew to Kutná Hora and began local warfare.
