= Rožmberk =

Rožmberk may refer to:

- Rožmberk nad Vltavou, a town in the Czech Republic
  - Rožmberk Castle in the town
- Rožmberk Pond, a fish pond in the Czech Republic
- Rosenberg family (Czech: Rožmberkové), a Czech aristocratic family

== See also ==
- Rosenberg (disambiguation), German variant
