= Church of Saint Vitus (Český Krumlov) =

- Czech: kostel svatého Víta
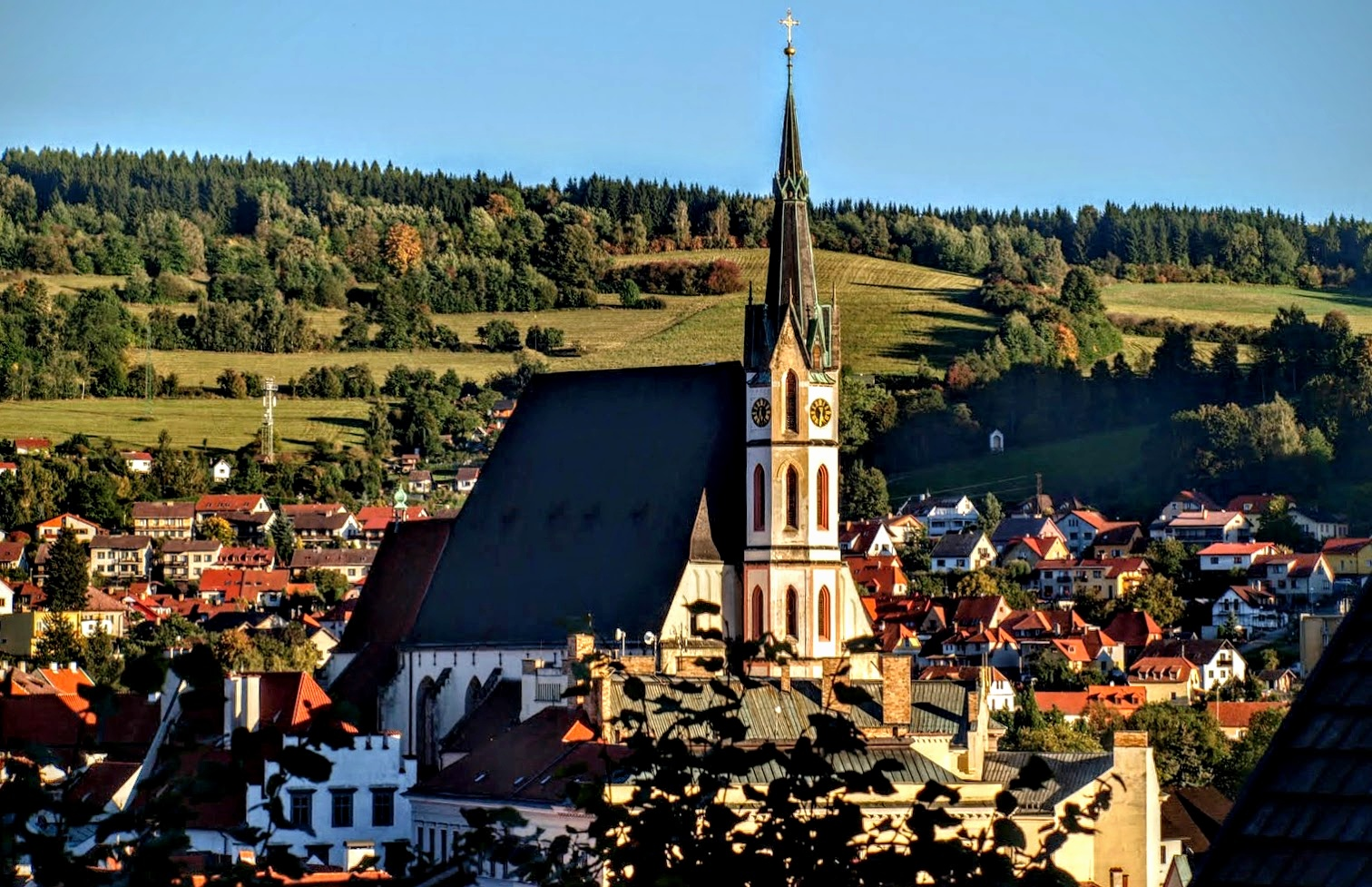
- Church of Saint Vitus
- 48°48′37″N 14°18′58″E
- Location: Český Krumlov
- Address: 160 Horní, Vnitřní Město
- Country: Czech Republic
- Denomination: Catholic Church
- Website: http://www.farnostck.bcb.cz/

History
- Status: Parish church
- Founded: 1309
- Founder: Peter I of Rosenberg
- Dedication: Saint Vitus

Architecture
- Functional status: active
- Heritage designation: National Cultural Monument of the Czech Republic; World Heritage Site
- Architect: Jan Staňka
- Architectural type: Hall church
- Style: Czech Gothic, Brick Gothic, Neo-Gothic
- Years built: 1407–1438

Specifications
- Materials: Brick

Administration
- Diocese: České Budějovice

National Cultural Monument of the Czech Republic
- Official name: Kostel sv. Víta v Českém Krumlově
- Designated: 15 November 1995
- Reference no.: 190

UNESCO World Heritage Site
- Official name: Historic Centre of Český Krumlov
- Type: Cultural
- Designated: 1992
- Reference no.: 617

Recording of the church bells from 1936

Church of Saint Vitus (Czech: kostel svatého Víta) is a Roman Catholic church in Český Krumlov, Czech Republic. It is dedicated to Saint Vitus. It is an important late-Gothic monument built in 1407–1438, with later modifications. In 1995, it was declared a national cultural monument.

== Construction-historical development ==
The history and development of the church are inherently connected with the two noble families – the Rosenbergs and the Schwarzenbergs, who made Český Krumlov their settlement town and the church of St. Vitus thus represented the main sanctuary of the Rosenberg dominion and the Duchy of Krumlov. The church was rebuilt several times during the rule of the Eggenbergs.

The first church built at its present location was founded in 1309. The first presbytery was built in 1317 by Peter I of Rosenberg and in 1340 it was rebuilt under the leadership of Master Linhart. However, the main and monumental reconstruction was initiated during the reign of Rosenberg Henry III. Indeed, the original church was not able to accommodate enough believers of the ever-growing settlement town, and it was, therefore, necessary to build a new church. The current building dates back to 1407 to 1438, while the foundations of the original church were used and, for example, the nave masonry dates back to the second half of the 14th century. We know from the preserved contract between the pastor Hostislav and Master Jan that it was explicitly stated that eight columns should be used to support sexpartite vaulting according to the pattern of the Church of Saint Giles in Milevsko and the net vault inspired the Cathedral of St. Vitus in Prague by Peter Parler. Although Master Jan Staněk, a member of the Prague Stonemason Family, started the construction, he did not continue to participate in it for unknown reasons. The new church was consecrated by the Passau bishop Leonard von Laiming in 1439.

Before 1500, an organ loft was built and another major intervention was the construction of a massive Rosenberg mausoleum and a new altar with the Rožmberk rider (coat of arms). However, both elements were gradually removed at the urging of the local Jesuits. Further major expansion occurred between 1725 and 1726 when Český Krumlov became the seat of the Schwarzenbergs. They built a new chapel of St. John of Nepomuk, the guardian of the House and the Dominium. The chapel also had a so-called Heart Tomb, where the hearts of the Krumlov dukes were deposited

The last important stage was a drastic neo-Gothic reconstruction in the 19th century when Baroque elements were removed and, unfortunately, many elements of the Pre-Baroque. Thus, in 1893–1894, the original Baroque onion dome tower was removed and replaced by the current Neo-Gothic tower. The church was then restored in 1899–1900. A thorough interior repair and equipment repair was carried out in 1936.

== Chapel of St. Jerome (1389–1787) ==
Czech and German-speaking residents lived side by side since the foundation of Český Krumlov. Since the sermon was preached in Czech, German believers began to preach the Rosenbergs sermons in German. For this purpose, the Chapel of St. Jerome, which existed at the church in Kostelní Street since 1389, served until the German sermon in 1602 was moved to the Church of St. Jošt. The chapel was desecrated during the period of the secularization of the monarchy and sold in 1787.

== Cemetery ==
Until 1585 the church was partially surrounded by a cemetery. However, due to a lack of space after a severe plague, it was moved to today's City Park to St. Martin's Chapel.

== Building description ==
=== Interior ===
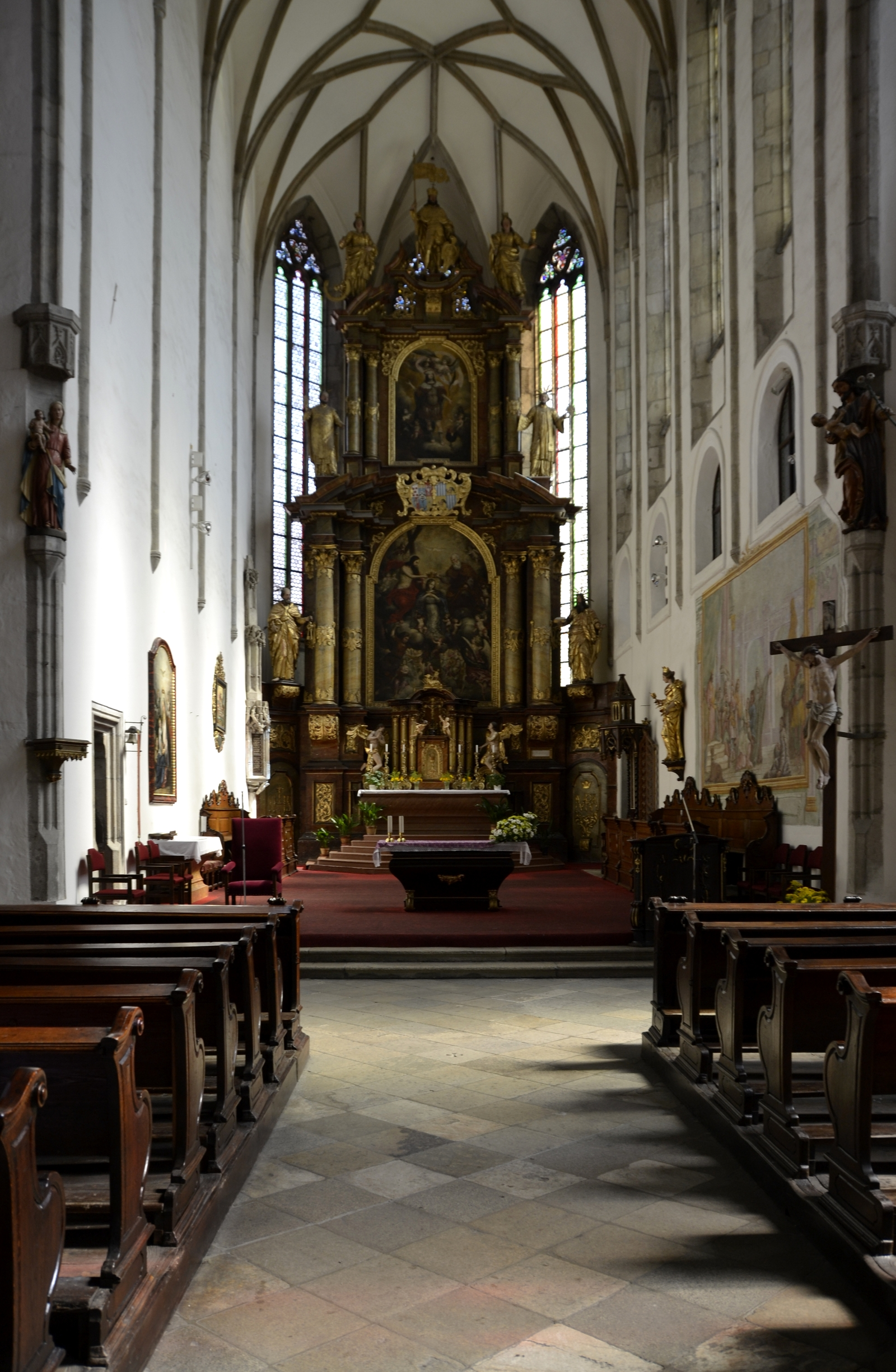
Apse with Baroque furnishings

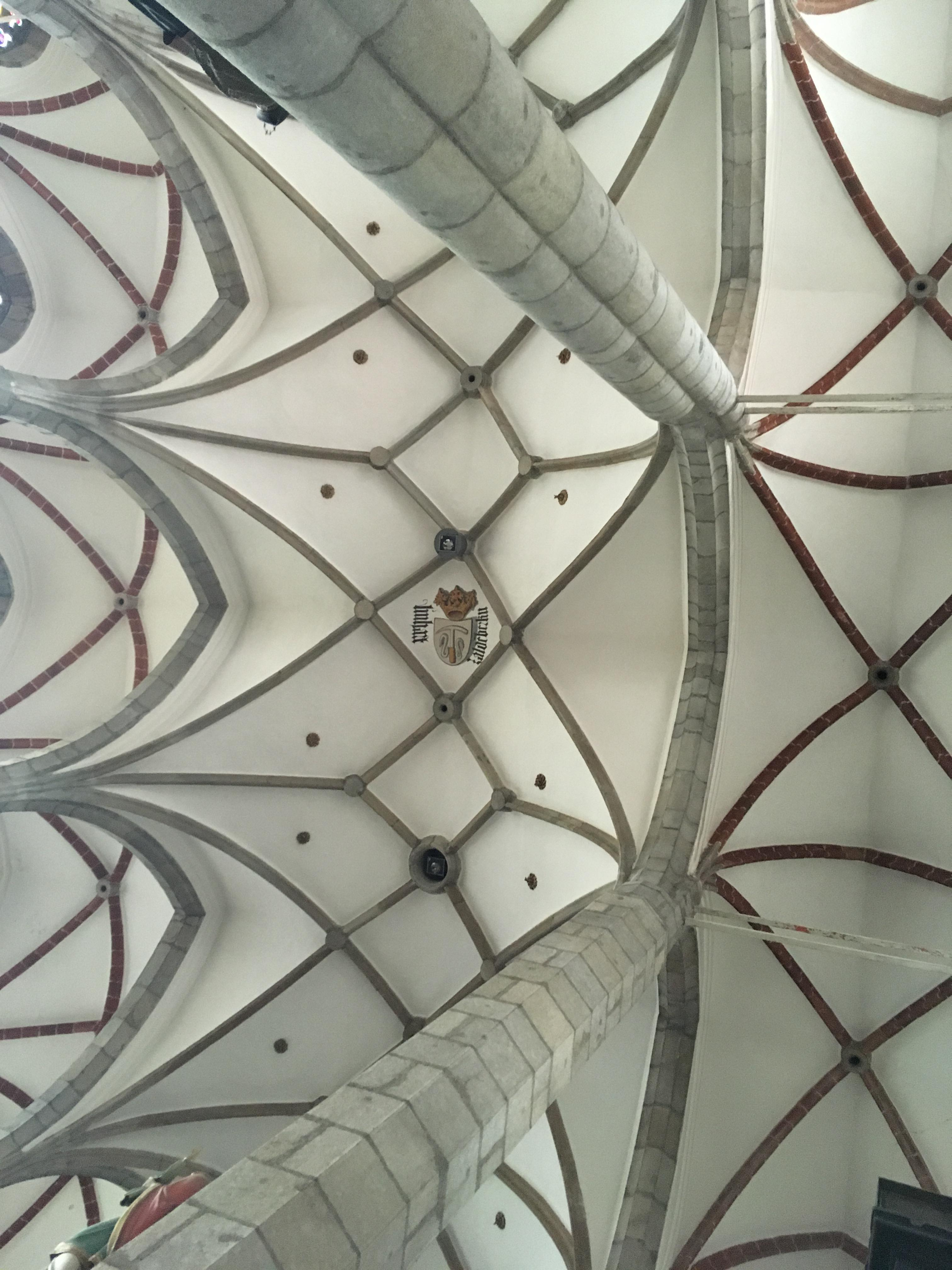
Vaulting of the nav

The building is a three naval hall with a long presbytery with a pentagonal ending, a tower on the axis of the western facade, a rectangular sacristy, resurrection chapels and St. John of Nepomuk, and an entrance hall with an entrance portal on the north side. In the Milevian net vault (named after a special type of vault in the Church of St. Giles in Milevsko) of the presbytery, the ribs are supported by the cylindrical profile supports. The ribs are terminated at the lower edge of the windows by pyramidal brackets. In the ending behind the altar is a simple saddle portal.

The entrance to the northern sacristy is also through the saddle portal. The extensions end at the bottom edge of the windows with pyramidal brackets. On the north wall (to the left of the altar) is a valuable sanctuary from the year 1500 - made of stone, richly decorated. Behind the altar in the apse is a simple saddle portal. The northern sacristy is vaulted with a variation of the Milevian net vault from 1425. The ribs extend from figural consoles. The space on the first floor above the sacristy has sexpartite vaulting with pyramidal brackets.

The southern sacristy is from 1637 and it is vaulted with three cross vaults with stucco ribs; upstairs is a flat-ceilinged oratory from the second half of the 18th century.

The presbytery is segregated from the main nave by an ogive; only the upper arch seems vigorous, the ribs are more delicate alongside the canopies in which the sculptures are embedded.

In the western part, there is a remarkable late Gothic triforium, supported by pillars of columns. The space under the triforium is vaulted with a net vault. The entrance to the triforium is lined with a saddle portal from 1510.

The three-aisles hall church is carried by four pairs of pillars, alternately in the outline of octagonal and four-leafed pillars. Each column is carrying a statue of a saint on a corbels, the two columns nearest to the altar are decorated by a statue of Mother Mary and the Saint Vitus, both statues have canopy above them. The main nave has a St. Vitus net vault type, in the main nave with stone ribs, in the side aisles are used ribs made of brick. The aisles are vaulted with cross rib vault. The ribs pass through the walls without capitals turning into a rounded fine pillar that extends from the ground.

The northern portal is Gothic, richly profiled, dating from about 1410. The wooden carved doors are from the late 17th century. The anteroom in front of him was vaulted in 1900.

Two chapels are added to the church. The Baroque Chapel of St. John of Nepomuk from 1725 built by A. E. Martinelli is rectangular, semi-circular. The Chapel of the Resurrection is originally Gothic, in the 18th century it was rebuilt in Baroque style (e.g. rid of ribs) and in 1777 it was painted by František Jakub Prokyš. The two chapels are entered from the nave by semicircular arches.

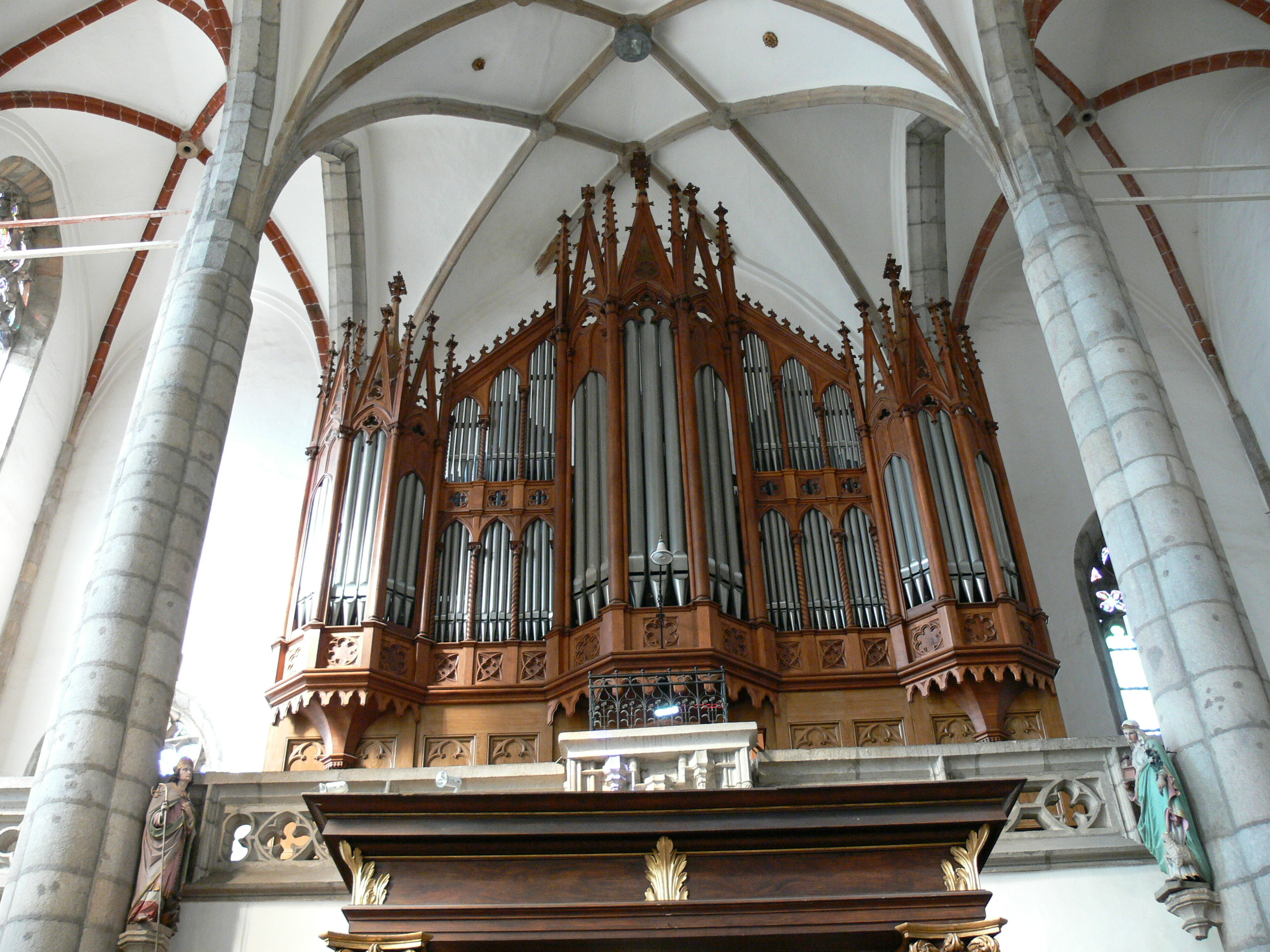
Organ loft

=== Furnishings and interior decoration ===
- Gothic fresco of St. Catherine on the north wall
- Valuable figural frescoes on the north wall
- On the South Wall - a fresco-illustration of the legend of St. Vitus
- Valuable altar from the early Baroque period
- Rococo side altar of St. Paul
- Other Neo-Gothic altars
- Rococo Department
- Valuable tombstones and epitaphs of the Renaissance

=== Exterior ===
Almost the whole church masonry is covered in white plaster except the visible pier-butters extending from the south and the north walls, the corner masonry (for reinforcing the structure) and some minor decorations such as the window ledge lining the whole church.

Most noticeable is the bell tower in west with a pyramid roof. The tower is placed axial.

== Tombs of Český Krumlov rulers ==
=== Rosenberg Mausoleum ===
After the death of the penultimate ruler of the Rosenberg house of Wilhelm von Rosenberg in 1592, a tomb was built in the middle of the presbytery and a Rosenberg emblem (a rider) was placed above the main altar. The size of the tomb and its placement right in front of the altar had long been eyesore for the local Jesuits, who pointed out that the former ruler of the Dominicum had been compared to God. Above all, however, the tomb interfered with mass. The Rosenberg rider was removed in 1621, but the last wife of Wilhelm, Polyxena, prevented further demolition. The tomb was completely removed again in 1670, but it was totally expelled by Duke of Český Krumlov at that time, Jan Kristián I. The final removal of the above-ground part of the tomb was only allowed during the Josephine reforms in 1783. The pewter coffins of William and Anne of Baden were replaced with oaken ones and laid back in the underground cellar. The above-ground part was dismantled, the columns were subsequently used to build a canopy for the baptistery, and the tombstones of William and Anne Mary were first set in front of the altar, then attached to the Chapel of Sts. John of Nepomuk.

In the tomb of Wilhelm von Rosenberg was placed the body of the 3rd Duke of Český Krumlov, Jan Christian I of Eggenberg, however, the remains were later removed and transported to Graz, where it was buried in the family tomb of the Eggenbergs.

=== Northern entrance portal with vestibule along with Rosenberg emblem ===
The last wish of Eleonora Amalia, the wife of the first Duke of Český Krumlov from the Schwarzenberg family, Prince Adam Francis, was to rest in the newly built Chapel of St. John of Nepomuk. Her son, Prince and Duke Joseph I. Adam fulfilled her wish. After a spectacular procession, when her body was placed in an ordinary coffin to show her sympathy for the poor, was stored in the chapel. At the same time, however, a small cellar in the left side wall of the chapel was carved into which the hearts of both of Joseph's parents - Eleonora Amálie and Adam František - were placed side by side. Thus the tradition began when the hearts of the Český Krumlov dukes and their wives were stored in this small tomb. The tomb of hearts is covered with a plate of black marble, which carries the Latin text: Here are stored the hearts of Adam and his wife Eleonora, princes of Schwarzenberg and dukes of Krumlov. In 1745, Josef had this made out of love for his parents. Above the board is the emblem of Alliance connecting Schwarzenberg and Lobkowicz. The above-ground tomb was designed in the form of an altar. The content of the "heart tomb" is known from the watercolours paintings of the engineer Josef Langweil, who drew it in 1834. The Habsburgs in the Augustinian Church in Vienna also have a similar tomb of hearts (German Herzgruft).
