= Dolní Bukovsko =

- Market town
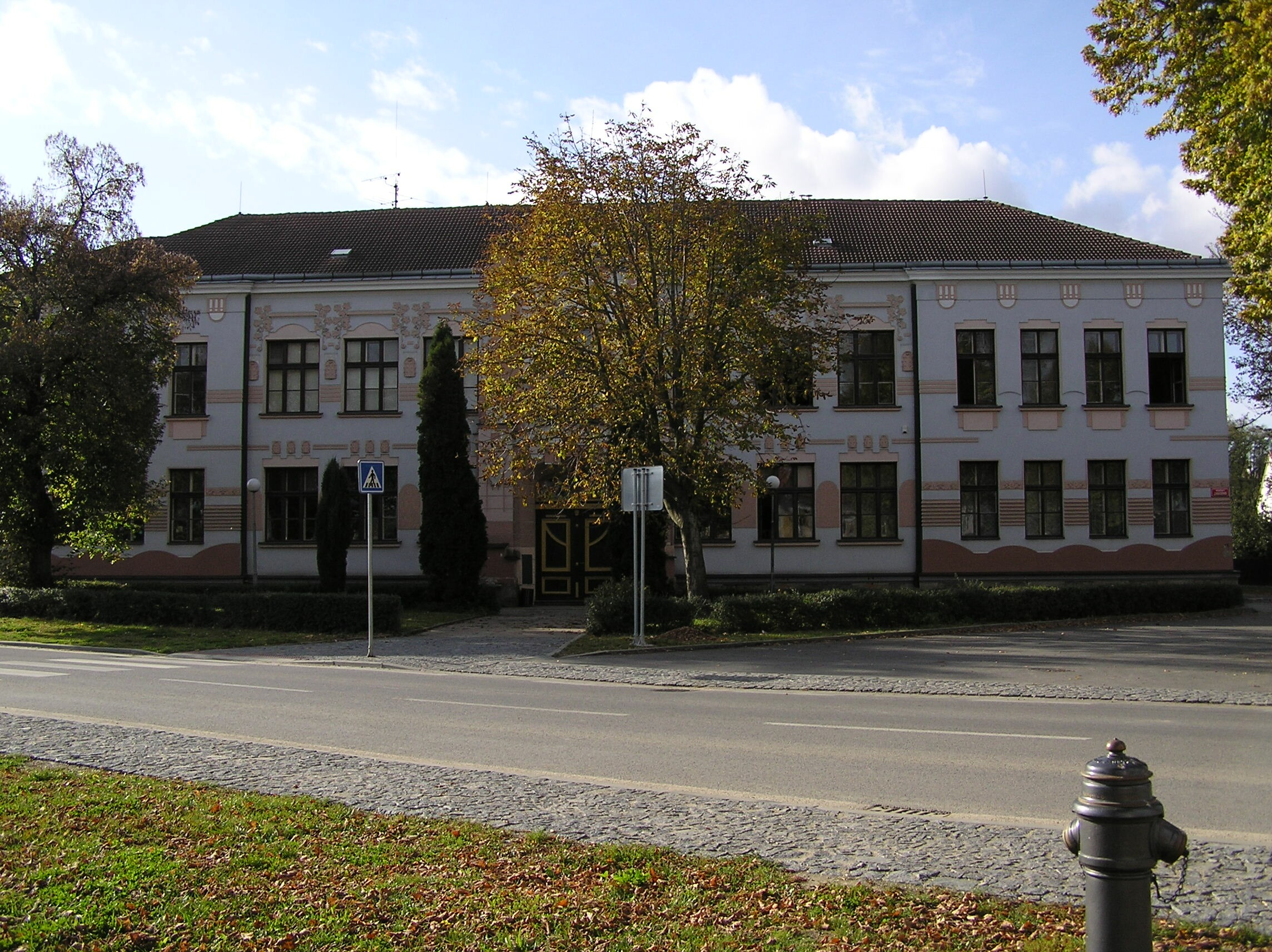
- Art Nouveau school building

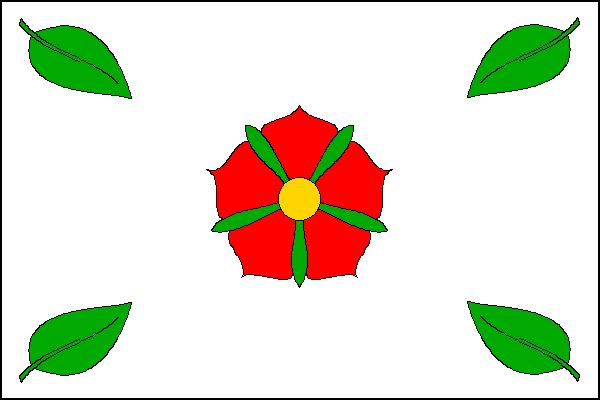
- Flag Coat of arms

- Location in the Czech Republic
- Coordinates: 49°10′15″N 14°34′53″E
- Country: Czech Republic
- Region: South Bohemian
- District: České Budějovice
- First mentioned: 1323

Area
  - Total: 35.39 km^{2} (13.66 sq mi)
- Elevation: 446 m (1,463 ft)

Population (2026-01-01)
  - Total: 1,731
  - Density: 48.91/km^{2} (126.7/sq mi)
- Time zone: UTC+1 (CET)
  - Summer (DST): UTC+2 (CEST)
- Postal code: 373 65
- Website: www.dolnibukovsko.cz

Dolní Bukovsko (Czech pronunciation: [ˈdolɲiː ˈbukofsko]) is a market town in České Budějovice District in the South Bohemian Region of the Czech Republic. It has about 1,700 inhabitants.

== Administrative division ==
Dolní Bukovsko consists of eight municipal parts (in brackets population according to the 2021 census):

- Dolní Bukovsko (1,233)
- Bzí (62)
- Horní Bukovsko (97)
- Hvozdno (37)
- Pelejovice (49)
- Popovice (42)
- Radonice (96)
- Sedlíkovice (47)

== Etymology ==
The suffix -sko indicates that Bukovsko was founded on the site of an abandoned settlement and partly took its name. A predecessor of Bukovsko was probably a village called Bukovice. The prefix dolní means 'lower' and distinguishes the settlement from Horní Bukovsko ('upper Bukovsko').

== Geography ==
Dolní Bukovsko is located about 22 kilometres (14 mi) northeast of České Budějovice. It lies on the border between the Tábor Uplands and Třeboň Basin. The highest point is at 553 m (1,814 ft) above sea level. There are several small fishponds in the municipal territory.

== History ==
Dolní Bukovsko was probably founded by King Ottokar II. The first written mention of Dolní Bukovsko is from 1323, when King John of Bohemia exchanged the settlement for another villages with Peter I of Rosenberg. From 1323 until the early 17th century, it was owned by the Rosenberg family.

== Demographics ==
Historical population

Year	Pop.	±%
1869	2,833	—
1880	2,694	−4.9%
1890	2,518	−6.5%
1900	2,499	−0.8%
1910	2,499	+0.0%

Year	Pop.	±%
1921	2,500	+0.0%
1930	2,312	−7.5%
1950	1,833	−20.7%
1961	1,801	−1.7%
1970	1,592	−11.6%

Year	Pop.	±%
1980	1,567	−1.6%
1991	1,503	−4.1%
2001	1,426	−5.1%
2011	1,572	+10.2%
2021	1,663	+5.8%

Source: Censuses

== Transport ==
There are no railways or major roads passing through the municipality.

== Sights ==
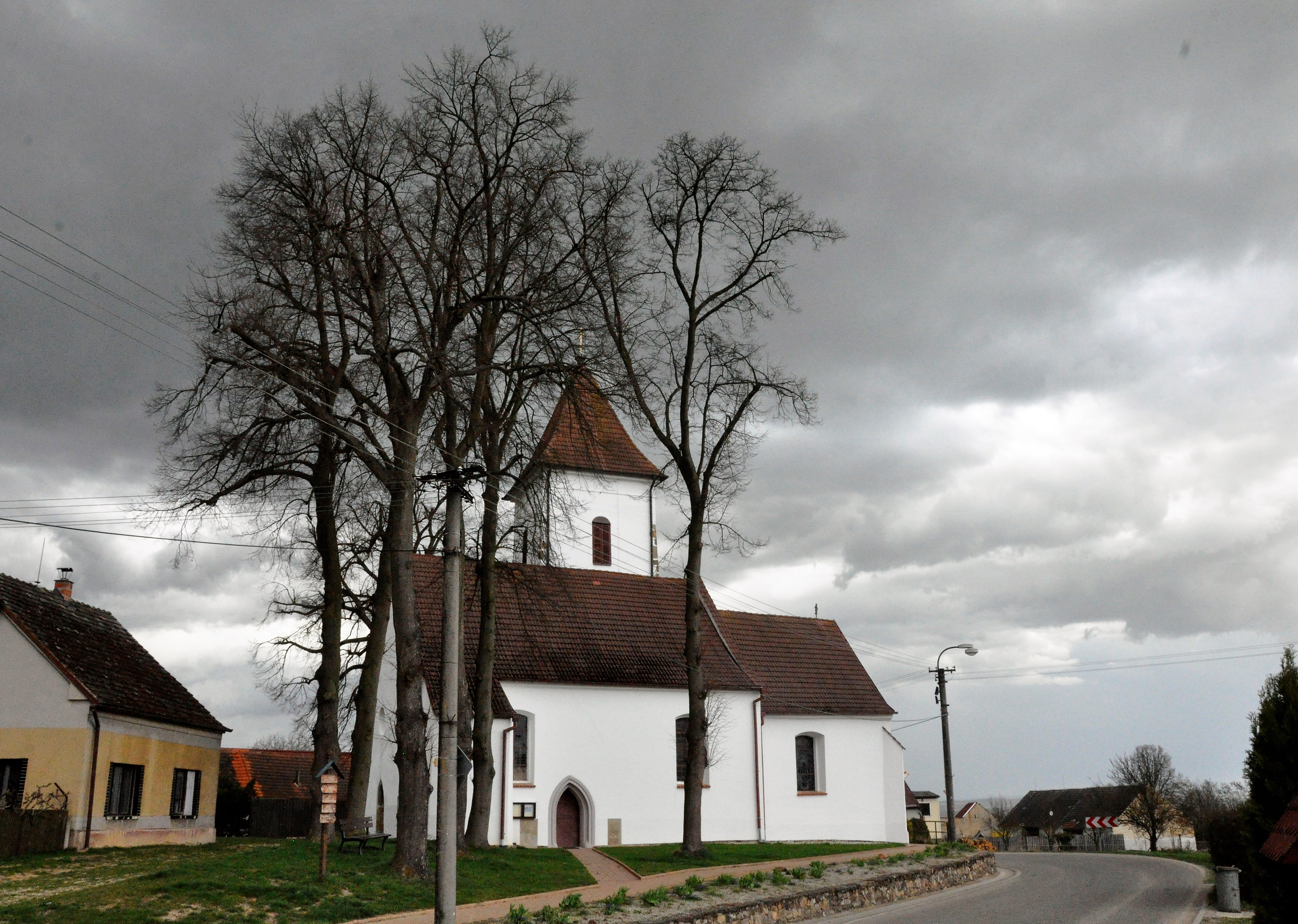
Church of Saint Stephen

The main landmark of Dolní Bukovsko is the Church of the Nativity of the Virgin Mary. Originally an early Gothic building from the 13th century, it was rebuilt into its present pseudo-Gothic form in 1853–1855. In the interior, valuable Gothic wall paintings from the 1360s have been partially preserved. Next to the church is a small chapel from the 18th century.

The Church of Saint Stephen is located in Horní Bukovsko. It was built in the Gothic style and then rebuilt several times. In 1670, it was extended and the tower was added. The church still retains some valuable original Gothic building elements.

== Twin towns – sister cities ==
Dolní Bukovsko is twinned with:

- Kallnach, Switzerland
