= Oldřich I of Rosenberg =

Bohemian nobleman (d. 1390)

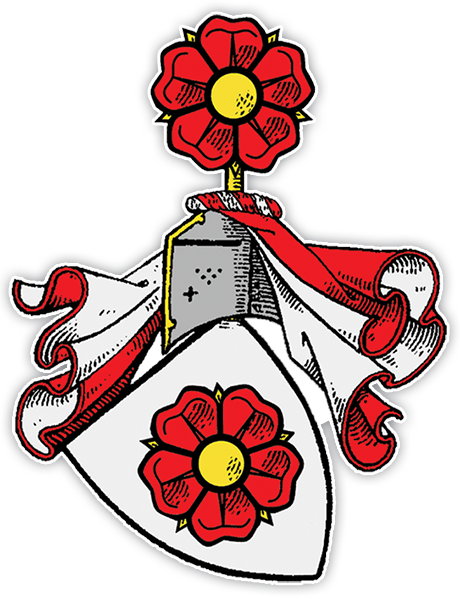
- Coat of arms
- Native name: Oldřich I. z Rožmberka
- Died: 4 March 1390
- Buried: Vyšší Brod Monastery
- Noble family: Rosenberg family
- Wife: Elizabeth of Vartemberk
- Issue: Henry III of Rosenberg
- Father: Peter I of Rosenberg
- Mother: Kateřina of Vartemberk

Oldřich I of Rosenberg (died 4 March 1390) was the fourth son of Peter I of Rosenberg and his second wife, Kateřina of Vartemberk. Together with his mother and brothers, he founded a Minorite monastery in Český Krumlov.

After the death of his older brother Jošt of Rosenberg, Oldřich became head of the Rosenberg family. Between 1381 and 1382, together with his brothers and Jindřich of Hradec, Oldřich militarily supported Jindřich of Schaunberg in his dispute with Albert III, Duke of Austria. The dispute was eventually mediated by Czech King Wenceslas IV.
