= Eggenberg Brewery =

Eggenberg Brewery may refer to:

- Pivovar Eggenberg, a brewery in Český Krumlov, Czech Republic
- Eggenberg Castle, Vorchdorf, known for its brewery, Vorchdorf, Austria
