= Flag of Český Krumlov =

The current flag of Český Krumlov, Czech Republic, was formally given to the town by the chairman of the Chamber of deputies Václav Klaus on June 14, 2001.

The town's previous flag had been green and white, but it had not been heraldically correct. The new flag consists of blue, white and blue stripes in the proportion 1:4:1, with a five-petalled red rose in the centre. The flag's ratio is 2:3. The rose is recommended to be half to two-thirds of the flag's width.

The rose comes from an emblem of the powerful Rožmberk family, who were important in Krumlov's history.
