= Tumlirz =

Tumlirz is a surname. Notable people with the surname include:

- Otto Tumlirz (1890–1957), Czech-Austrian psychologist
- Ottokar Tumlirz (1856–1928), Austrian physicist
