= Peter III of Rosenberg =

Bohemian nobleman (1381–1406)

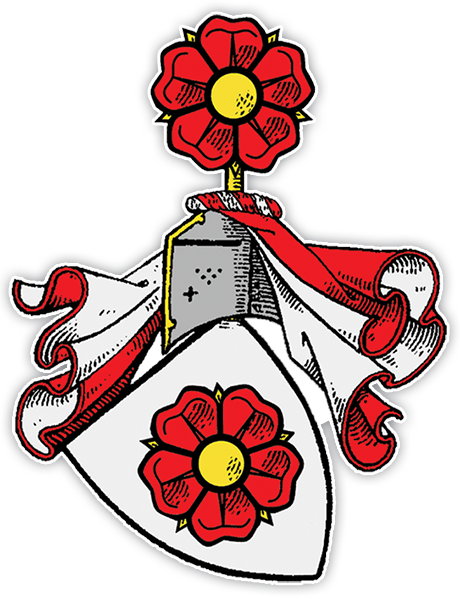
- Coat of arms
- Native name: Petr III. z Rožmberka
- Born: 1381
- Died: 7 December 1406 (aged 24–25)
- Noble family: Rosenberg family
- Father: Henry III of Rosenberg
- Mother: Barbara of Schaunberg

Peter III of Rosenberg (Czech: Petr III. z Rožmberka; 1381 – 7 December 1406) was a nobleman from the Rosenberg family.

== Biography ==
Peter was born as the eldest son of Henry III of Rosenberg and his first wife Barbara of Schaunberg. He was the first in line to succeed his father. He got engaged on 14 December 1396 to Anna Landgraves of Leuchtenberg and Countess of Hals. However, the wedding did not take place because Peter died at the age of 25. After the death of his father in 1412, Peter's half-brother Oldřich II became the head of the Rosenberg family.

== Bibliography ==
- Kubíková, Anna. Rožmberské kroniky. Krátký a summovní výtah od Václava Březana (in Czech). Veduta. ISBN 80-86829-10-3.
- Klimesch, Matthäus (1904). Urkunden- und Regestenbuch der ehemaligen Klarissinen-Kloster in Krummau (in German). Prague: Verein für Geschichte der Deutschen in Böhmen.
