= Joseph Karl Ambrosch =

Czech opera singer

Joseph Karl Ambrosch (Czech: Josef Karel Ambrož; 6 May 1759 – 8 September 1822) was a Czech tenor opera singer and composer.

== Early life ==
Born in Český Krumlov, Ambrosch lived in Berlin as a tenor opera singer since 1791. Since 1792 he has been part of the ensemble of the Berlin Royal National Theater, which August Wilhelm Iffland had led since 1796. Ambrosch appeared in plays as well as in operas and musical plays. One of his most successful roles was that of the landowner Weller in the German version of Ferdinando Paer's Poche ma buone, ossia Le donne cambiate (1800), Der lustige Schuster, oder: Die verwandelten Weiber (first performance on 25 May 1807). In Mozart's The Magic Flute he sang Papageno over 21 times between 1806 and 1812. He mostly played smaller supporting roles in plays. In Julius von Voss's comedy Künstlers Erdenwallen (premiered on 29 January 1810) he played the role of a Jew.

Together with the singer and actor Joseph Michael Böheim, he published the three-part collection Freymauer Lieder, which contained works by numerous contemporary composers, including a large number of songs composed by himself. Both were members of the Berlin Masonic lodge Zur Beständigkeit. Ambrosch died in Berlin in 1822, aged 63.
