= Karel Šmirous =

Karel Šmirous (1890 in Český Krumlov – 1981 in Prague) was a Czech scientist and the only Czech photographer who specialized in color photography using the autochrome process.

Karel Šmirous took his first black-and-white photographs at the age of 12. After leaving high school, he wanted to become a painter; however, his father decided that he should study chemistry. During his studies at Czech Technical University in Prague from 1908–1912, he became aware of autochrome, and began his lifelong interest in color photography. His photograph of Český Krumlov, taken in 1908, and published by Minerva in 1910, was the first known Czech color postcard using autochrome.

Back in Český Krumlov, Šmirous worked with local photographer Josef Seidel. With him, he photographed Český Krumlov and the mountain area of Šumava (Bohemian Forest), where he photographed nature in color, especially the Boubín primeval forest. His sense of art composition was also influenced by his mother, who had herself studied painting with Amálie Mánesová, sister of famous painter Josef Mánes.

Šmirous gained further experience in Germany and France, and his chemistry studies, specializing in color dyes, allowed him to experiment with color printing techniques. In 1913 he met the Lumière brothers, and because of all their common interests, they became firm friends, and he remained in contact with them till end of their lives.

After gaining his Doctorate in Chemistry, Šmirous worked as assistant to Prof. Votočka. During the period 1913 – 1918, he made first experiments with color printing, and after the war, he was sent by the Czech Academy of Sciences to visit the laboratory of the Lumière brothers in France. He worked there several times in his career, and in 1931, he solved the problem of enlarging color photographs under artificial light.

Šmirous' long research into color printing culminated in his discovery and patent of the Hydrotype process in 1921. For this invention, and the photographs printed by it, he was given a gold medal at the World Expo in Paris in 1937. Despite interest in the invention from Kodak, his technique was not widely adopted, partly because of WWII, and partly due to the introduction of modern color photographic paper. Karel Šmirous is the author of three Czechoslovak patents in the area of color photography.

In parallel with his scientific career, Karel Šmirous was also a very successful photographer. His photographs are not only technically excellent, but are also notable for their composition and use of color. From his early experiments with color, he developed a style with careful choice of colors, often using only variants of a single dominating color. His work is very rich thematically – he photographed in still life, portraits, nudes, landscapes, reportages, advertisements and scientific photography.

Šmirous published color postcards of excellent technical quality, and presented lectures and exhibitions with color photographs and 18×24 cm autochrome slides. He also published a number of books, and prepared a representative booklet, “Czechoslovakia”, for the 1958 World Expo in Brussels.
