= International Music Festival Český Krumlov =

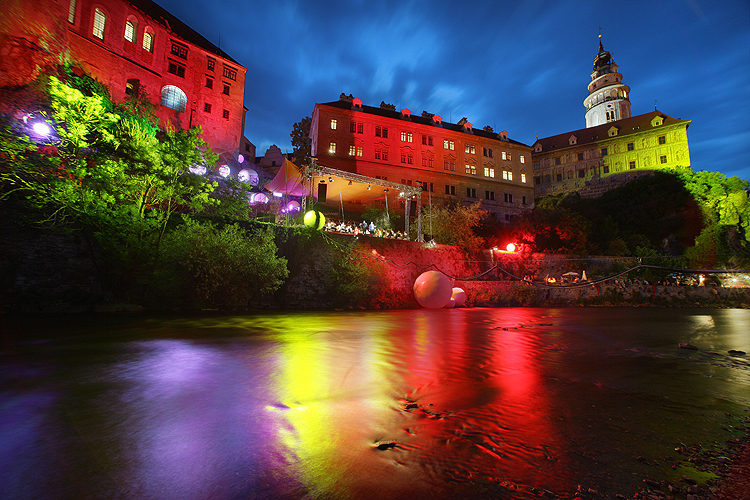
Opening Night of the International Music Festival Český Krumlov

The International Music Festival Český Krumlov is the longest-running summer music festival in the Czech Republic, having been established in 1992. Offering a wide range of musical genres performed by Czech and international artists, the Festival is held every July and August in the UNESCO world heritage town of Český Krumlov.
