= Rožmberk Castle =

Castle in the Czech Republic

Rožmberk
- Český Krumlov, South Bohemia
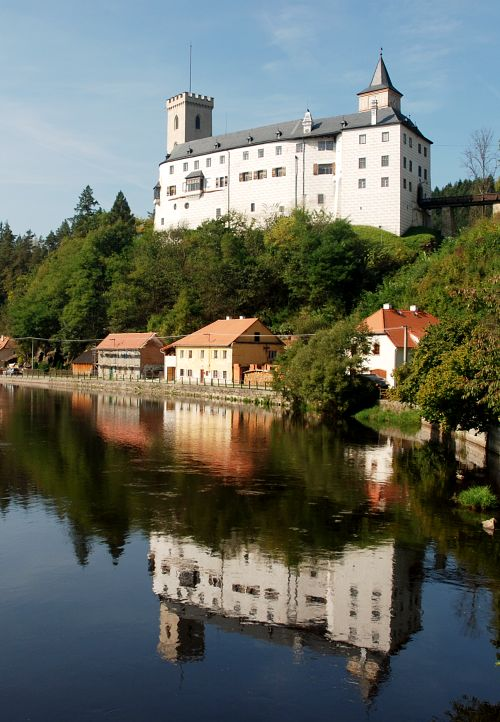
- Rožmberk Castle

Site information
- Type: Castle

Location
- Location in the Czech Republic
- Coordinates: 48°39′25″N 14°22′10″E

Site history
- Built: 13th century

Rožmberk (German: Rosenberg) is a castle situated in South Bohemia near Rožmberk nad Vltavou in the Czech Republic. Considered one of the oldest castles in Bohemia, it stands on a promontory carved out on three sides by the river Vltava. It was first mentioned in 1253 in a document signed by Vok "von Rosenberg". It is regarded as the cradle of the House of Rožmberk, also known as the "Lords of the Rose", a historical Czech aristocratic family.

== History ==
The Rožmberk castle was founded in the first half of the 13th century either by Vítek the Younger of Prčice, or by his son Vok of Prčice, a member of the powerful Vítkovci family (Witikonides in Latin; Witigonen in German) who later styled himself Vok of Rožmberk (Vok de Rosenberch) after this castle. The original castle, known as Horní hrad (Upper Castle), consisted of a high tower known as the Jakobínka, 9.6 metres (31 ft) in diameter, with corbelled ramparts and a palace. The structure was completely surrounded by castle walls with a moat. Within a short time, a tributary town grew in the barbican. The castle became the administrative and economic centre of the family's lands, a part of which Vok gave to the newly established Cistercian monastery in Vyšší Brod. In 1302, when the cadet Krumlov branch of the Vítkovci died out, Vok's offspring inherited Český Krumlov and they settled there permanently. After 1330 Jindřich of Rožmberk built the Dolní hrad (Lower Castle), which was defended by ramparts placed above the moat, which was cut through the neck of the rock.

In 1420 Oldřich II of Rožmberk (1403–1462), father of Perchta of Rožmberk, the White Lady, was forced to pawn the castle to the Lords of Walsee from Austria to get money to finance the army he was fielding against the Hussites. The loan was paid off. The image of Perchta on the Rožmberk castle contains a mysterious inscription in the Enochian script, that in his personal journals already mentioned Rudolphian occultists John Dee and Edward Kelley. In 1465 the castle was pawned again to the Lobkovic family. This loan too was paid off. The Starý (Horní) hrad (Old or Upper castle) burned down in 1522 and was never rebuilt.

In 1600 Petr Vok of Rožmberk bequeathed the castle and its estates to his nephew Johann Zrinski of Seryn (1565–1612), son to Nikola Šubić Zrinski. Zrinski rebuilt the Lower castle in Renaissance style. When he died in 1612, the estates were inherited by the Švamberks, relatives of the Rožmberks. But they soon lost the castle because all their estates were confiscated after the Battle of White Mountain by Emperor Ferdinand II, who gave it to the commander of the Imperial army, Charles Bonaventure de Longueval, Count of Bucquoy, who played an important role in the suppression of the rebellion of the Czech Estates. The Buquoys, whose main residence was in Nové Hrady, repaired and altered their family seat (1840–57), remodelling the building in the style of Romantic Neo-Gothic, and keeping it until 1945 when it was nationalised after the end of World War II.

== Architecture ==
The castle was opened to the public in the middle of the 19th century as one of the first museums in Bohemia. The Rožmberk tradition is represented by the Renaissance sgraffito decoration of the outside facades and beautiful painted decorations of the interiors.

The Gothic fortress was changed during the Renaissance era and then in the 19th century within the "Tudor Gothic Passion" period. The last owners of the castle, the Buqouy family (who were Czech nobles of French origin), transformed it into a museum open to the public, one of the first museums in the Bohemian land. The main palace, with its architectural features of several historic styles, shelters a unique collection of Baroque furniture and paintings as well as a wonderful Renaissance Hall with a famous "musical niche" in the so-called Knight's Hall. The message "Loves disappear, colours fade" was discovered in 2004 carved on a wall in the Knight's Hall. This was done by Spanish soldiers in the 17th century.

The interiors, mostly renovated in the Neo-Gothic style, are furnished with valuable pieces of furniture, some of which feature custom wood carvings commissioned for the museum. Neither the style nor the furniture of the castle have been changed since its reconstruction in the Romantic style was completed. The castle picture gallery contains several valuable Czech and European paintings from artists of the Late Renaissance and Baroque eras, such as Bartholomeus Spranger, Karel Škréta, Jan Kupecký, and Norbert Grund. Among them the painting of Perchta, "the White Lady" of Rožmberk, one of the most famous ghosts in Bohemia. She has supposedly appeared several times during the centuries since her death. A local legend has it that if one understands what is written in secret signs on the picture, this one would free her and find a silver treasure.

The armoury contains a unique collection of stabbing and cutting weapons, firearms, war relics, and heraldic emblems. The picture gallery is full of remarkable paintings dating as far back as the Renaissance era. A bronze elephant sculpture in the courtyard is a copy made in 2003. The original elephant from 1916, had been stolen from its original owners by Nazis and brought to the castle. The sculpture was installed and remained lost for 50 years, standing here in the courtyard. The owners found the elephant and it was returned to them to make amends for the Holocaust. Now the elephant is back home in Switzerland and the copy stands in its place to delight visitors, who gently touch it.

== See also ==
- House of Zrinski
