= Pivovar Eggenberg =

Brewery in Český Krumlov, Czech Republic

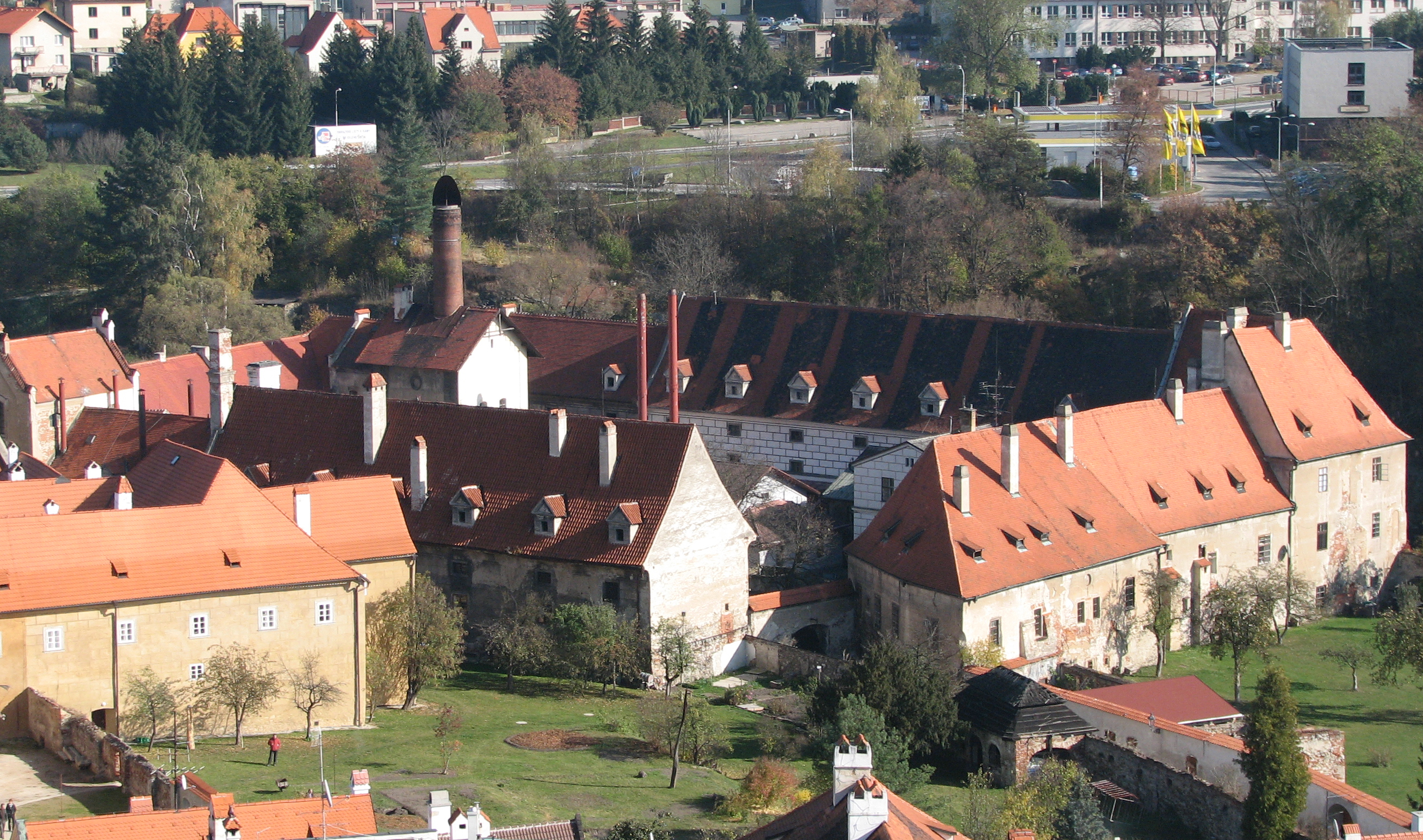
- The brewery
- Interactive map of Pivovar Eggenberg
- Location: Český Krumlov, Czech Republic
- Coordinates: 48.8133°N 14.3194°E
- Opened: 1625
- Owner: Český Krumlov Centrum, a. s.
- Website: www.eggenberg.cz

Pivovar Eggenberg is a brewery in Český Krumlov, Czech Republic.

Brewing in Český Krumlov dates back to 1336. The House of Rosenberg acquired a brewery in the town in 1522 and relocated it to its current location from 1625 to 1630. After the death of the male inheritors of the House of Rosenberg (1611), in 1622 the dominion was given to the House of Eggenberg and in 1628 Hans Ulrich von Eggenberg was named Duke of Krumau by Ferdinand II. Thus the House of Eggenberg acquired the lucrative dominion including possession of Český Krumlov Castle and the brewery. The Eggenberg's held the dominion in their possession until 1717 when the last male heir to the House of Eggenberg died at only 13, after which the dominion and the Eggenberg Bohemian possessions passed to the House of Schwarzenberg which began modernizing the brewery in 1719 and decorated it in the Baroque style.

The brewery's equipment and machinery were kept up to date during the Schwarzenbergs' ownership. Production volumes increased dramatically during this period, reaching almost 35.000hl at the end of the 19th century. Hops from their Postoloprty estate were used from the late 18th century onwards.

== Confiscation of the brewery ==
In 1940, the brewery was seized by Nazi Germany, as were all Adolph Schwarzenberg's other properties within the reach of the Third Reich.

Following World War II, the Nazi expropriation was perpetuated by the government of Czechoslovakia under Edvard Beneš. It first declared national administration of Schwarzenberg's Czech properties and then tried to confiscate them under the so-called Beneš decrees. This, however, proved impossible due to the owner's impeccable anti-fascist credentials and Czechoslovak citizenship. In order to prevent the return of the properties, 143/1947, also known as "Lex Schwarzenberg", was promulgated in 1947. This law is a unique case of ad hominem legislation. It is directed exclusively at Adolph Schwarzenberg (the two persons additionally named in this law were dead at the time and he was their legal successor), and deprives him of his property rights without justification, explanation or compensation.

The application of law 143/1947 remains disputable, because it contravenes the Czechoslovak Constitution of 1920, which was in force at the time of promulgation. Furthermore, an appeal against the previous confiscation under presidential decrees was pending, rendering any additional act null and void.

== Privatisation and closure ==
In September 1991, the brewery was sold in an auction to Jiří Shrbený and František Mrázek for CSK 75 million. The property was incorporated in a company Pivovar Eggenberg. Mrázek was murdered in 2006 under unclear circumstances. On 16 May 2008 judge Josef Šimek declared bankruptcy of Pivovar Eggenberg, five days later judge Bohuslav Petr appointed bankruptcy administrator Štěpán Bláha. In 2014 the brewery was closed down and the beers under Eggenberg brand has been brewed in Pardubice Brewery since then.

In 2016 a new craft brewery Historický pivovar Krumlov was founded at the site of the old brewery. The rest of the brewery complex is being reconstructed into a museum of brewing and a hotel.
