= Rožmberk nad Vltavou =

- Town
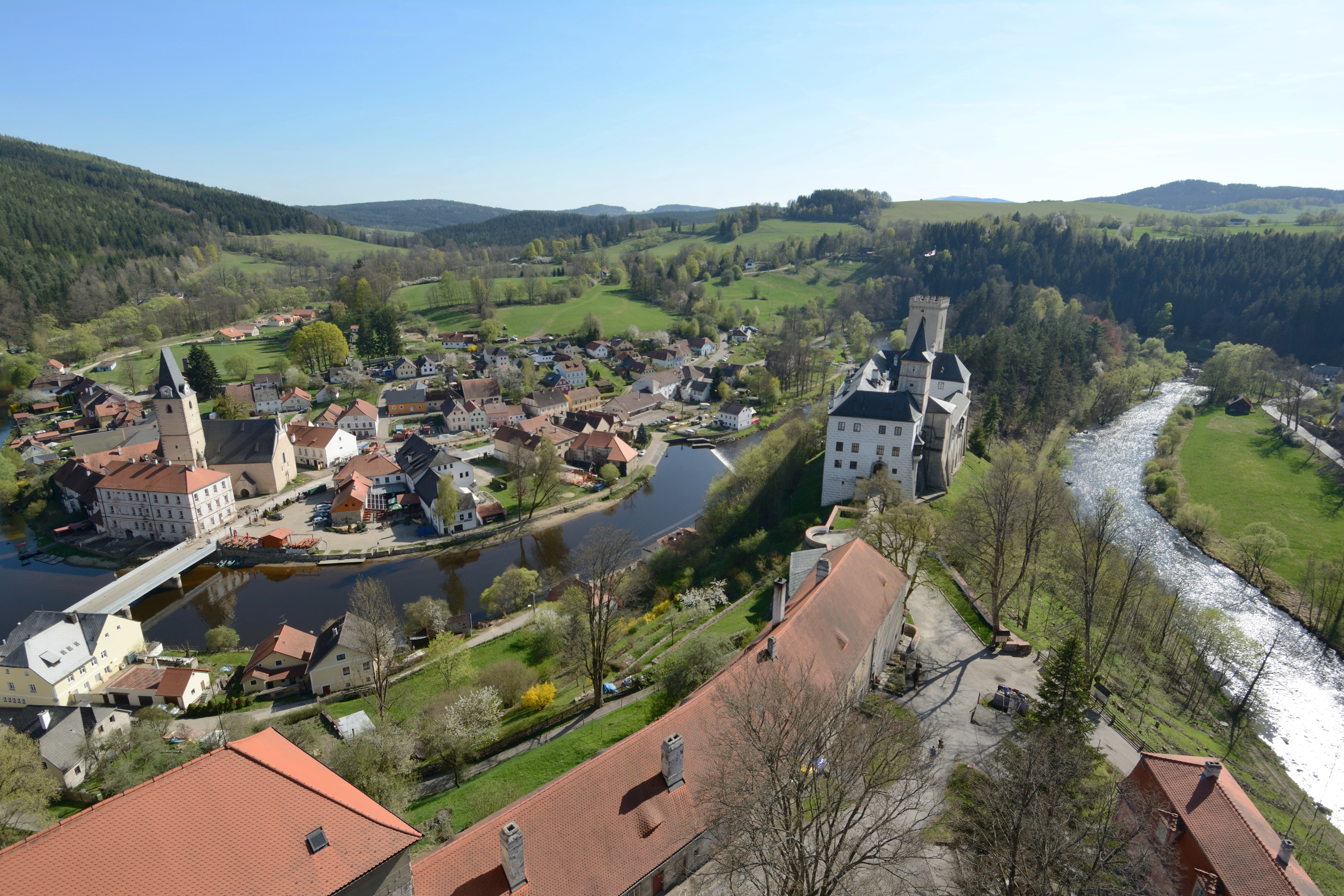
- View of Rožmberk nad Vltavou from the north

- Flag Coat of arms

- Location in the Czech Republic
- Coordinates: 48°39′19″N 14°22′1″E
- Country: Czech Republic
- Region: South Bohemian
- District: Český Krumlov
- First mentioned: 1250

Government
  - Mayor: Bohuslav Čtveráček

Area
  - Total: 24.81 km^{2} (9.58 sq mi)
- Elevation: 528 m (1,732 ft)

Population (2026-01-01)
  - Total: 369
  - Density: 14.9/km^{2} (38.5/sq mi)
- Time zone: UTC+1 (CET)
  - Summer (DST): UTC+2 (CEST)
- Postal code: 382 18
- Website: www.mestorozmberk.cz

Rožmberk nad Vltavou (Czech pronunciation: [ˈroʒmbɛrk ˈnad vl̩tavou]; German: Rosenberg) is a town in Český Krumlov District in the South Bohemian Region of the Czech Republic. It has about 400 inhabitants. The town is located on the Vltava River in the Bohemian Forest Foothills.

The main landmark of the town is the Rožmberk Castle, which is protected as a national cultural monument. The urban area with the castle is well preserved and is protected as an urban monument zone.

== Administrative division ==
Rožmberk nad Vltavou consists of two municipal parts (in brackets population according to the 2021 census):

- Rožmberk nad Vltavou (209)
- Přízeř (134)

== Etymology ==
The German name Rosenberg and the Czech transliteration Rožmberk mean 'rose castle', 'rose mountain'. The castle and therefore the town were named after the coat of arms of its founder, the nobleman Vok I of Prčice (since then known as Vok I of Rosenberg), which included a five-petaled rose.

== Geography ==
Rožmberk nad Vltavou is located about 17 kilometres (11 mi) south of Český Krumlov and 35 km (22 mi) south of České Budějovice. It lies in the Bohemian Forest Foothills. The highest point is the hill Velenecký vrch at 822 m (2,697 ft) above sea level. The Vltava River flows through the town.

== History ==
The first written mention of the Rožmberk Castle is from 1250. It was built shortly before this year and the town was founded at the same time as the castle. It developed on a trade route from Český Krumlov to Linz in Upper Austria. While owned by the Bohemian aristocratic Rosenberg family, Rožmberk obtained town rights and grew in wealth. In 1620, the town became property of Count Charles Bonaventure of Bucquoy. The Bucquoys owned the castle until 1945.

== Demographics ==
Historical population

Year	Pop.	±%
1869	2,107	—
1880	2,110	+0.1%
1890	1,880	−10.9%
1900	1,719	−8.6%
1910	1,637	−4.8%

Year	Pop.	±%
1921	1,551	−5.3%
1930	1,502	−3.2%
1950	661	−56.0%
1961	647	−2.1%
1970	493	−23.8%

Year	Pop.	±%
1980	388	−21.3%
1991	335	−13.7%
2001	333	−0.6%
2011	371	+11.4%
2021	343	−7.5%

Source: Censuses

== Transport ==
There are no railways or major roads passing through the municipal territory. A train stop called Rožmberk nad Vltavou is located about 3 km (2 mi) south of the town, on the railway line from Lipno nad Vltavou to Dolní Dvořiště-Rybník, in the territory of Dolní Dvořiště.

== Sights ==
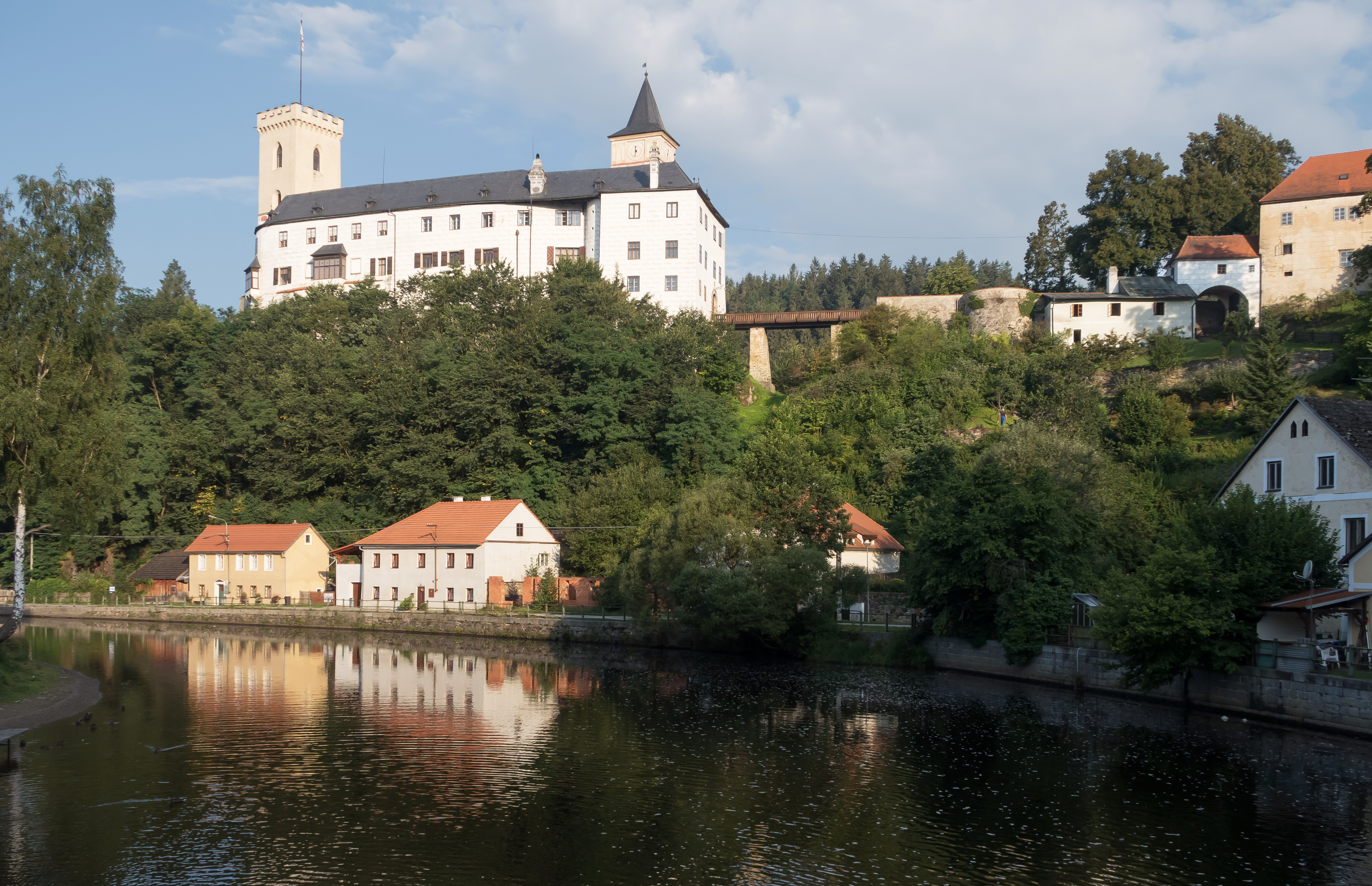
Rožmberk Castle

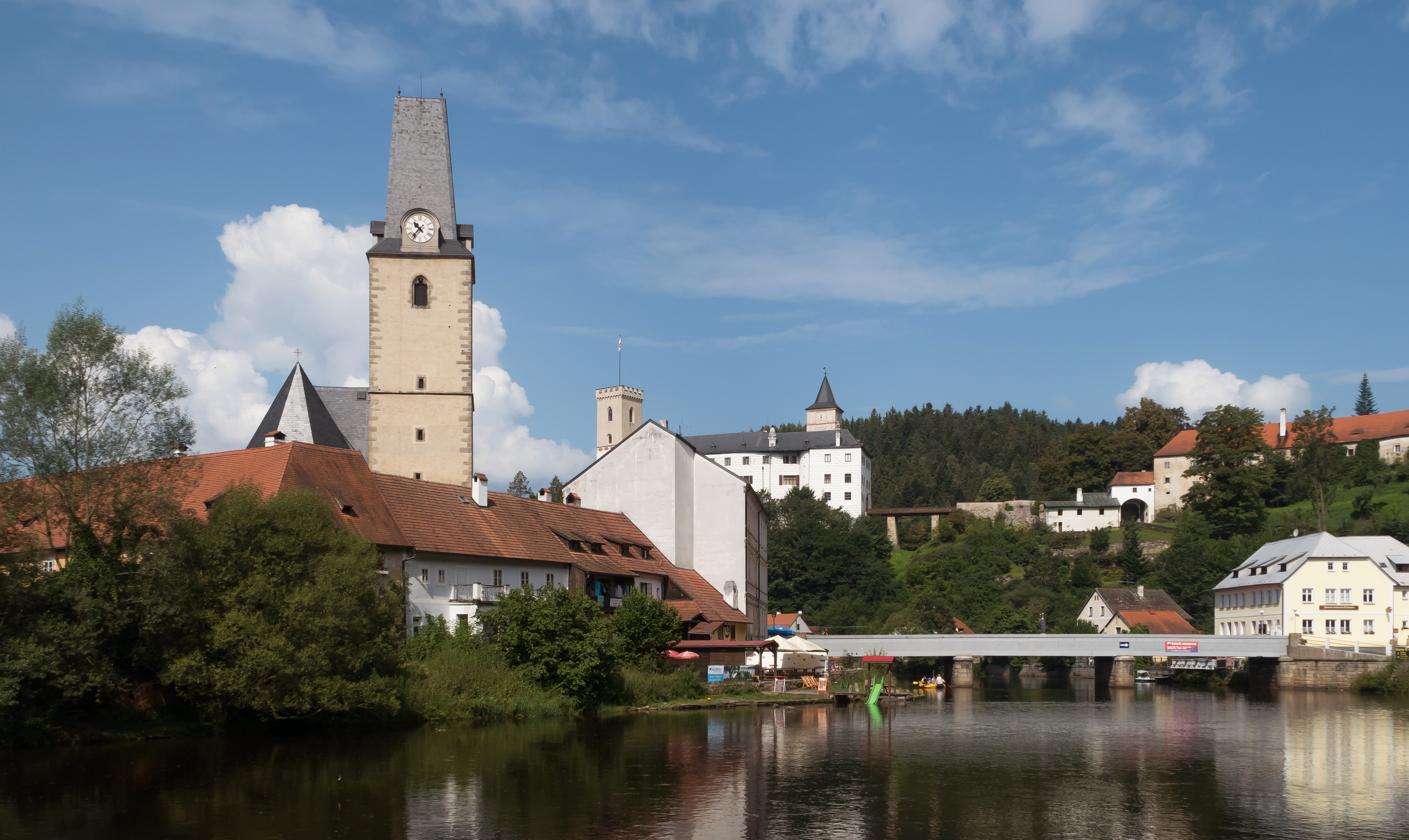
Church of Saint Nicholas

Rožmberk nad Vltavou is known for the Rožmberk Castle. Owned by the state, it is open to the public and offers guided tours. The castle had two parts – the upper part, from which only the Jakobínka watchtower has survived, and the lower part, which was rebuilt from a medieval castle into a Renaissance summer aristocratic residence. In the 19th century, it was modified in the neo-Gothic style. For its value, the castle complex is protected as a national cultural monument.

The second important landmark of the town is the Church of Saint Nicholas. It was first mentioned in 1271. In the late 15th century, the early Gothic church was rebuilt in the late Gothic style and the tower was added.

Other sights include burgher houses on the town square, dating from the 17th and 18th centuries.

== Notable people ==
- Sigismund Pirchan von Rosenberg (1389–1472), Catholic bishop
- Otto Tumlirz (1890–1957), Austrian psychologist

== Twin towns – sister cities ==
Rožmberk nad Vltavou is twinned with:

- Freistadt, Austria
