= Christoph Feldegg =

Austrian army officer and naturalist

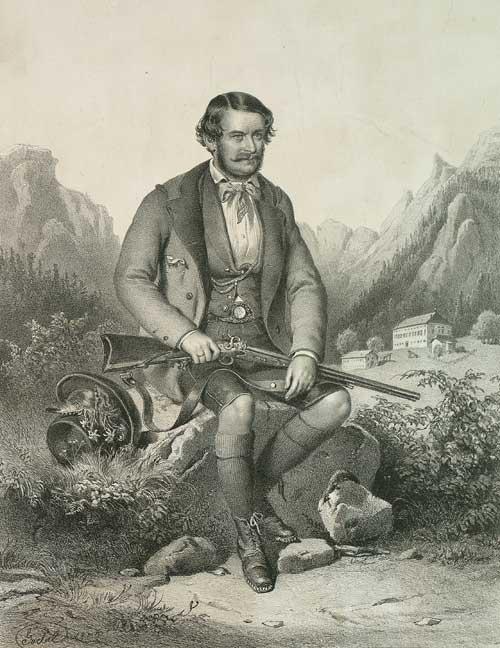
- Born: 13 October 1779; Český Krumlov, Bohemia
- Died: 10 May 1845 (aged 65); Leipzig, Kingdom of Saxony
- Education: Theresian Military Academy, Vienna
- Known for: Collection of natural history specimens
- Awards: Military Order of Maria Theresa, created Baron
- Scientific career
- Fields: Ornithology, Army officer

Baron Christoph Freiherr Fellner von Feldegg (13 October 1779 – 10 May 1845) was an Austrian army officer and naturalist.

== Life ==
Fellner was born in a noble family in Český Krumlov, Bohemia, where his father was a princely forester of the Schwarzenberg family. Fellner went to a military academy in Vienna and in 1808, became a sub-lieutenant in an army battalion and fought in the Battle of Aspern-Essling under Archduke Karl Ferdinand. He also served in the Regiment de Vaux in 1813 where he distinguished himself. In 1815, he was knighted in the Military Order of Maria Theresa. Feldegg fought in the Napoleonic Wars and in recognition of his many gallant deeds was created a Baron in 1817. He served in Dalmatia, eventually becoming Colonel and Commanding Officer of the 6th Battalion of Chasseurs.

Feldegg took a special interest in the birds of Dalmatia and accumulated a large collection of natural history specimens. He was a correspondent of C. L. Brehm, John Gould and Hermann Schlegel, and served for a time with the ornithologist Dr Karl Michahelles. His collection was donated to the Natural History Museum in Prague.

Feldegg had a number of birds named after him, including a subspecies of the Lanner falcon Falco biarmicus feldeggi and the black-headed wagtail, Motacilla flava feldegg, the Balkan and Black Sea sub-species of the yellow wagtail.
