= Henry III of Rosenberg =

Bohemian nobleman (d. 1412)

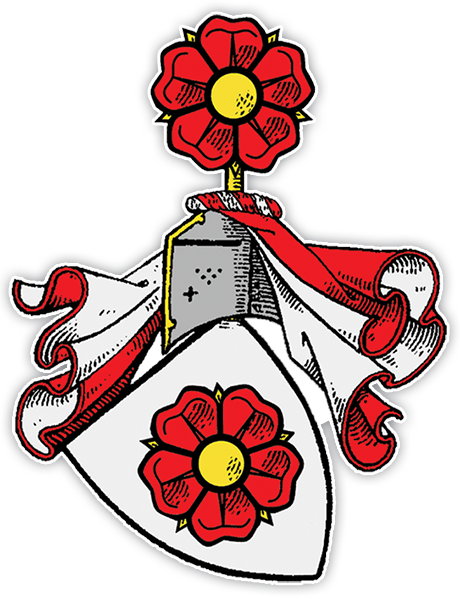
- Coat of arms
- Native name: Jindřich III. z Rožmberka
- Died: 28 July 1412
- Noble family: Rosenberg family
- Wives: Barbora of Schaunberg; Eliška of Kravař
- Issue: Peter III of Rosenberg; Oldřich II of Rosenberg
- Father: Oldřich I of Rosenberg

Henry III of Rosenberg (German: Heinrich III. von Rosenberg; died 28 July 1412) was a Bohemian nobleman who served as Supreme Burgrave of the Kingdom of Bohemia between 1396 and 1398, and between 1400 and 1403 in the Kingdom of Bohemia, an Imperial State in the Holy Roman Empire.

He was a member of the League of Lords and participated in the suppression of King Wenceslas IV in 1394 and 1402. He later served as the head of the Rosenberg State.

Henry died in 1412 leaving two children, his nine-year-old son Oldřich II of Rosenberg and his daughter Kateřina. Both were sired with his second wife Eliška of Kravaře. Henry's first son, Peter III of Rosenberg, died in 1406.

== In popular culture ==
Henry was depicted in the 2022 film Medieval. He was portrayed by German actor Til Schweiger.
