= Otto Tumlirz =

Otto Tumlirz, or Ota Tumlíř (23 July 1890, Rožmberk nad Vltavou – 3 January 1957, Graz) was a Czech-Austrian psychologist, researcher for pedagogy. He taught as a professor at the Graz University.

Tumlirz joined the Nazi Party in 1937.

== Literary works ==
- Jugendkunde, 2 vols., 1920–1921
- Probleme der Charakterologie, 1928
- Pädagogische Psychologie, 1930
- Jugendpsychologie der Gegenwart, ²1933
- Abriss der Jugendkunde und Charakterkunde, 1940
