= Český Krumlov =

- Town
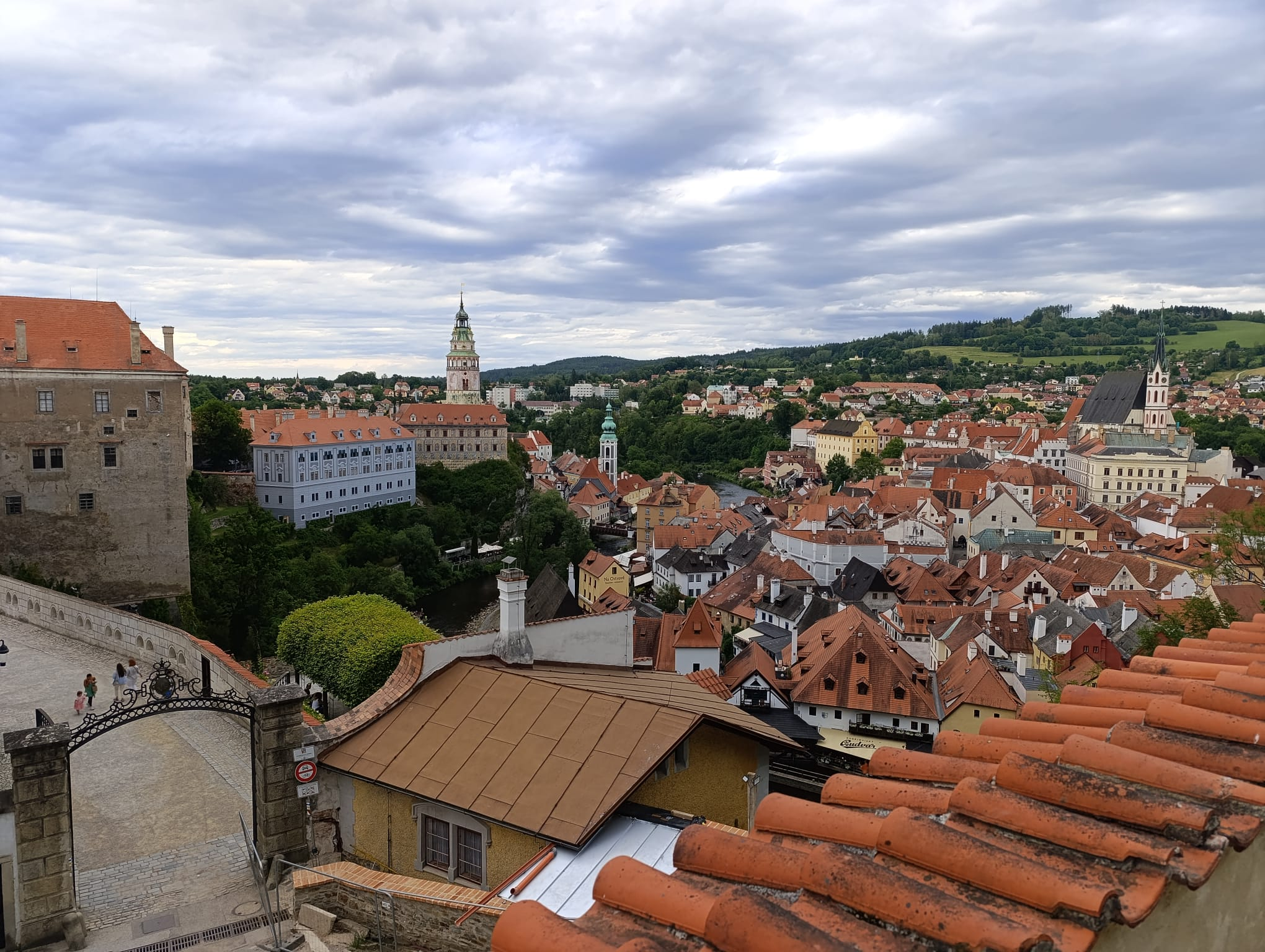
- View over Český Krumlov

- Flag Coat of arms

- Location in the Czech Republic
- Coordinates: 48°48′40″N 14°18′55″E
- Country: Czech Republic
- Region: South Bohemian
- District: Český Krumlov
- First mentioned: 1253

Government
  - Mayor: Alexandr Nogrády (ANO)

Area
  - Total: 22.16 km^{2} (8.56 sq mi)
- Elevation: 492 m (1,614 ft)

Population (2026-01-01)
  - Total: 12,658
  - Density: 571.2/km^{2} (1,479/sq mi)
- Time zone: UTC+1 (CET)
  - Summer (DST): UTC+2 (CEST)
- Postal code: 381 01
- Website: www.ckrumlov.cz

UNESCO World Heritage Site
- Official name: Historic Centre of Český Krumlov
- Criteria: iv
- Reference: 617
- Inscription: 1992 (16th Session)

Český Krumlov (Czech pronunciation: [ˈtʃɛskiː ˈkrumlof]; German: Krumau, Böhmisch Krumau) is a town in the South Bohemian Region of the Czech Republic. It has about 13,000 inhabitants. The town is located on the Vltava River in the Bohemian Forest Foothills.

Český Krumlov is known as a tourist centre, which is among the most visited places in the country. The historic centre with the Český Krumlov Castle complex is protected as an urban monument reservation, and since 1992, it has been a designated UNESCO World Heritage Site because of its well-preserved Gothic, Renaissance and Baroque architecture.

== Administrative division ==
Český Krumlov consists of ten municipal parts (in brackets population according to the 2021 census):

- Domoradice (2,122)
- Horní Brána (2,273)
- Latrán (777)
- Nádražní Předměstí (2,572)
- Nové Dobrkovice (126)
- Nové Spolí (552)
- Plešivec (2,833)
- Slupenec (87)
- Vnitřní Město (396)
- Vyšný (540)

The urban core is formed by Domoradice, Horní Brána, Latrán, Nádražní Předměstí, Plešivec and Vnitřní Město.

== Etymology ==
Krumlov has its origin in Middle High German Krumme Aue, which can be translated as crooked meadow. The town was named after a bend of the Vltava River. The adjective Český ('Bohemian', German: Böhmisch) was added in the 15th century to differentiate it from the town of Moravský Krumlov in south Moravia.

== Geography ==
Český Krumlov is located about 20 kilometres (12 mi) southwest of České Budějovice and 134 km (83 mi) south of Prague. It is situated on both banks of the Vltava River. It lies in the Bohemian Forest Foothills. The highest point of the municipal territory is the hill Vyšný vrch at 744 metres (2,441 ft) above sea level. The northern part of the territory belongs to the Blanský les Protected Landscape Area.

== History ==
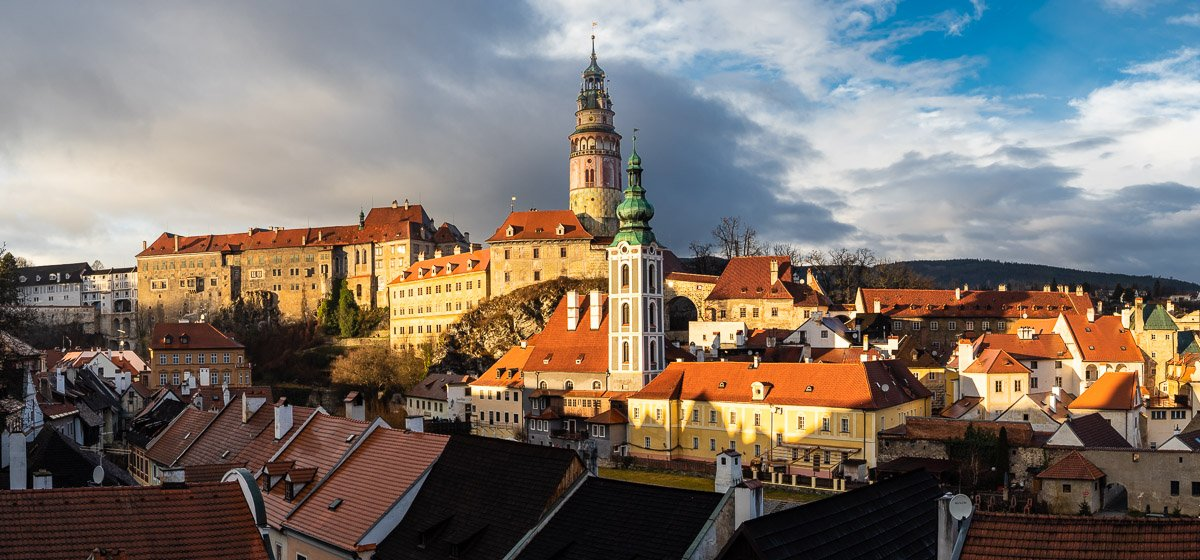
Český Krumlov Castle and the former Church of Saint Judoc

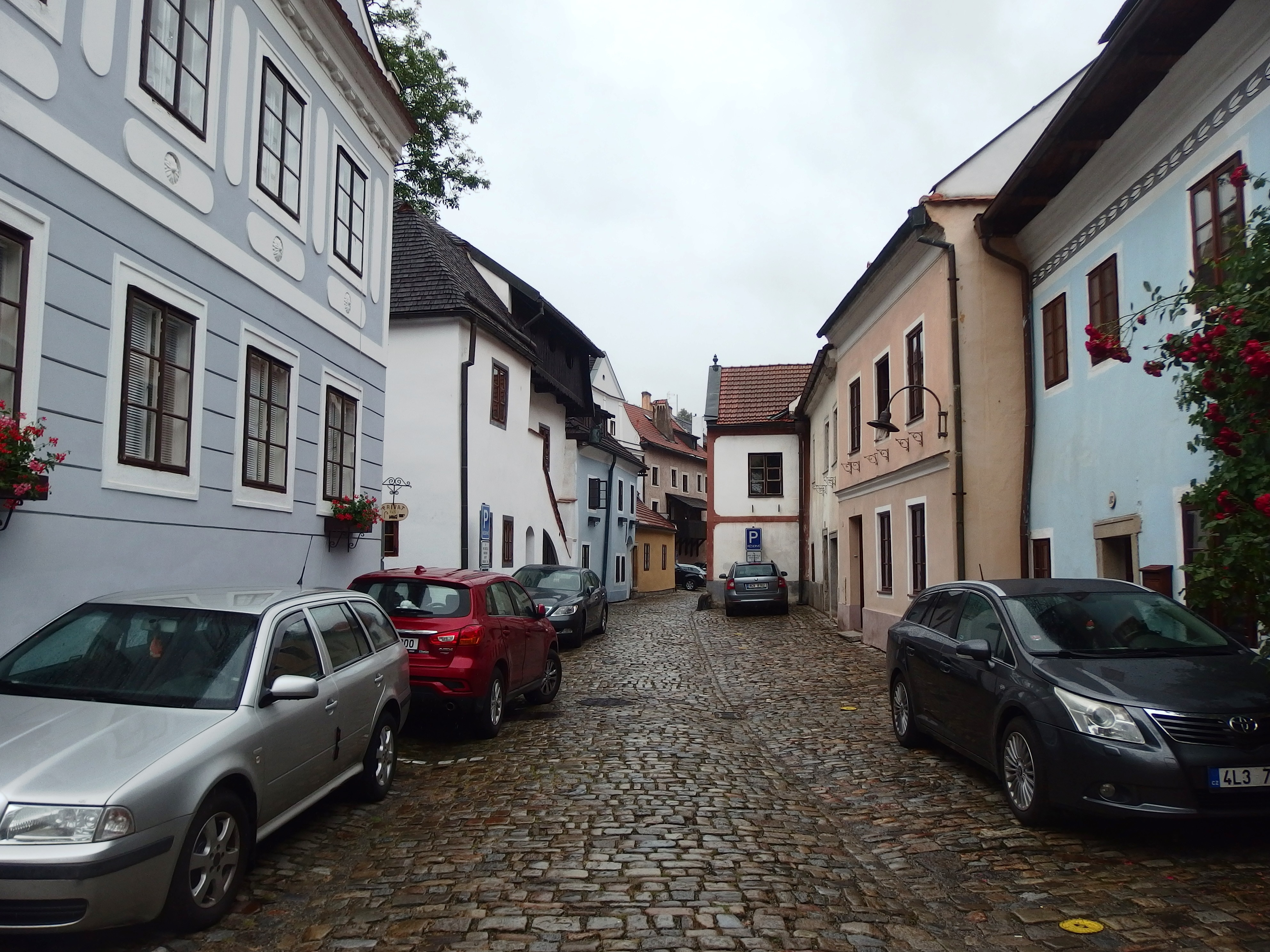
Parkán Street with Renaissance houses

Thanks to the convenient location by the river, the area has been permanently inhabited. The area's oldest settlement goes back to the Older Stone Age (70,000–50,000 BC), the mass settlement is proven in the Bronze Age (1,500 BC). Celtic settlements were here in the Younger Iron Age (c. 400 BC), and the first Slavic settlement from the 6th century AD. In the Early Middle Ages, trade routes led through this territory along the Vltava.

The Český Krumlov Castle was founded shortly before 1250 by a local branch of the noble Vítkovci family, descendants of Witiko of Prčice. The first written mention of Český Krumlov was in a 1253 deed as Chrumbenowe. The town was established in two stages. The first part called Latrán was built spontaneously below the castle, settled mostly by people who had some administrative connection with the castle. The second part was subsequently founded as a brand new settlement and called Old Town. Since the foundation of the town, both Czech and German nationalities were represented. A Jewish community is documented since 1334.

In 1302 the Vítkovci line became extinct and King Wenceslaus II, who acquired the estate and castle by escheat, ceded it to the Rosenberg family, who later made it the main residence of their family. Peter I of Rosenberg, the Lord Chamberlain of King John of Bohemia, had the present upper castle erected in the early 14th century. Under his rule the Rosenberg estates flourished. Český Krumlov achieved the highest prosperity in the 15th century during the rule of Oldřich II of Rosenberg, when the estate territory was considerably enlarged.

The Rosenbergs strongly promoted trade and crafts within the town walls. In the late 15th century, when gold was found next to the town, German miners came to settle, which shifted the ethnic balance even more. In one of the churches, the sermons were preached in Czech until the 1780s, when Church of Saint Judoc was closed. In 1555, William of Rosenberg joined the town parts of Latrán and Old Town, which had been up to then separate, and unified the town. In the late 16th century, he had the castle rebuilt in the Renaissance style.

In 1602, William's brother Peter Vok of Rosenberg sold Krumlov to Emperor Rudolf II, who gave it to his illegitimate son Julius d'Austria. After the Bohemian Revolt and the 1620 Battle of White Mountain, Emperor Ferdinand II gave Krumlov to the noble Eggenberg family and the town became seat of the Duchy of Krumlov. From 1719 to 1947, the castle belonged to the Schwarzenberg family.

In the 19th century, the industrialisation and development of transport occurred, and most of the town fortifications were demolished.

There were 8,662 inhabitants in Český Krumlov in 1910, of which 7,367 (85%) were Germans and 1,295 (15%) were Czechs. After World War I, Český Krumlov became part of the Bohemian Forest Region in a newly-created Czechoslovakia, but German-Austrian deputies declared the region be part of German-Austria. In 1919, the Treaty of Saint-Germain-en-Laye recognized the area as part of Czechoslovakia. In 1938, it was annexed by Nazi Germany under the Munich Agreement and administered as part of the Reichsgau Oberdonau. After World War II, the town's longtime German majority population was expelled and the town was returned to Czechoslovakia.

During the Communist era of Czechoslovakia, the historic Český Krumlov fell into disrepair. However, since the Velvet Revolution of 1989 much of the town's sights has been restored, and it is now a popular tourist destination.

In August 2002, Český Krumlov was damaged by the 2002 European floods.

== Demographics ==
Historical population

Year	Pop.	±%
1869	7,071	—
1880	8,106	+14.6%
1890	8,903	+9.8%
1900	9,412	+5.7%
1910	9,485	+0.8%

Year	Pop.	±%
1921	9,078	−4.3%
1930	9,709	+7.0%
1950	8,441	−13.1%
1961	9,294	+10.1%
1970	10,430	+12.2%

Year	Pop.	±%
1980	13,776	+32.1%
1991	14,108	+2.4%
2001	14,443	+2.4%
2011	13,361	−7.5%
2021	12,278	−8.1%

Source: Censuses

== Economy ==
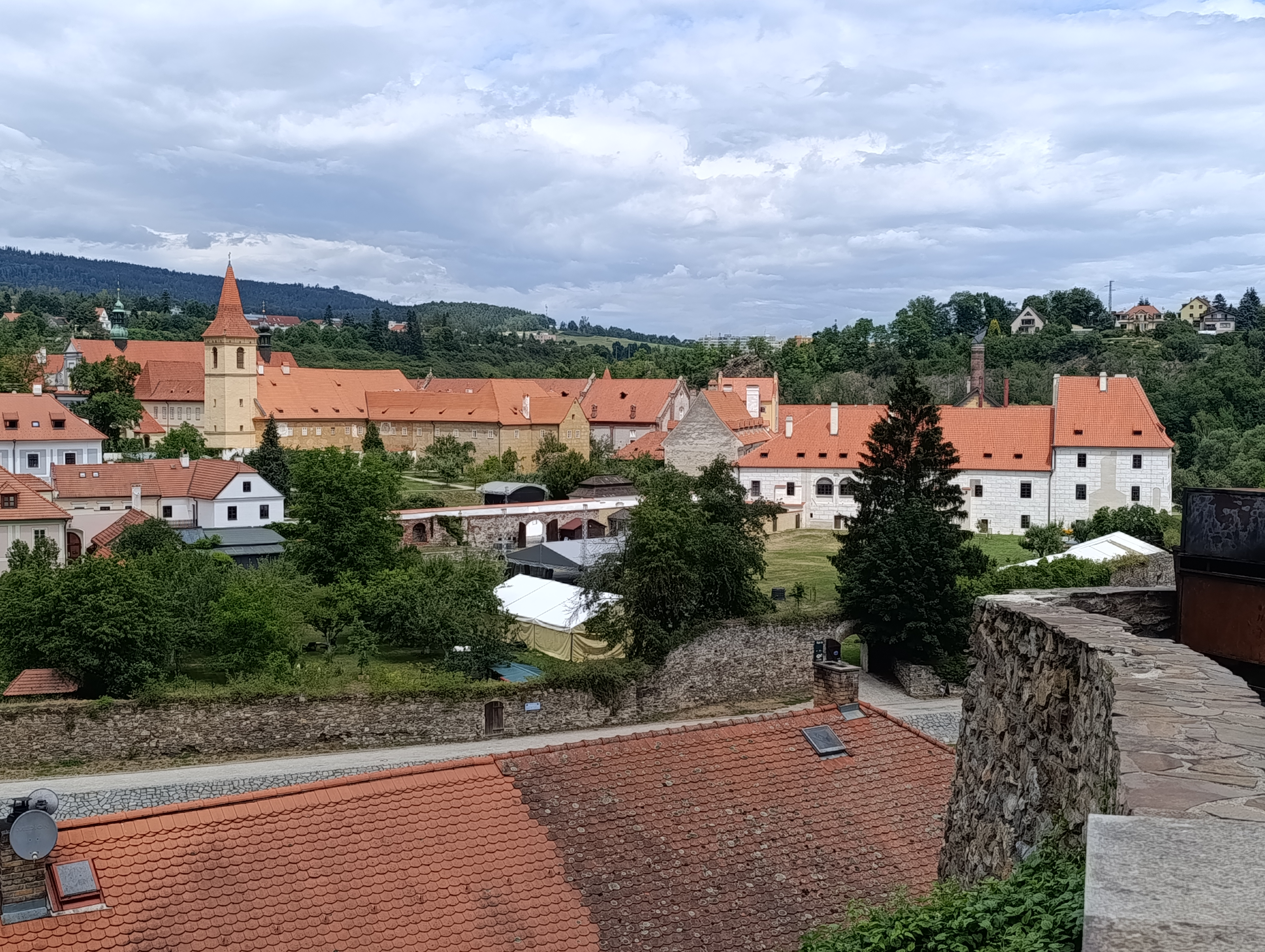
Former brewery (right) and the monastery complex (left)

There are several notable industrial companies. The largest of them are Linde Pohony (producer of propulsion and control systems for forklifts, part of Linde Material Handlings group), Fronius Česká republika (manufacturer of welding equipment and equipment for photovoltaic power plants, part of Fronius International) and two divisions of Schwan-Stabilo corporate group, Schwan Cosmetics (producer of cosmetic pencils) and Schwan-Stabilo (producer of writing instruments). The largest non-industrial employer is the Český Krumlov Hospital.

From 1560, Český Krumlov was also home to the Pivovar Eggenberg brewery. In 2014, the brewery was closed and since 2016, a new small historical brewery has been operating in the premises of the former brewery.

== Transport ==
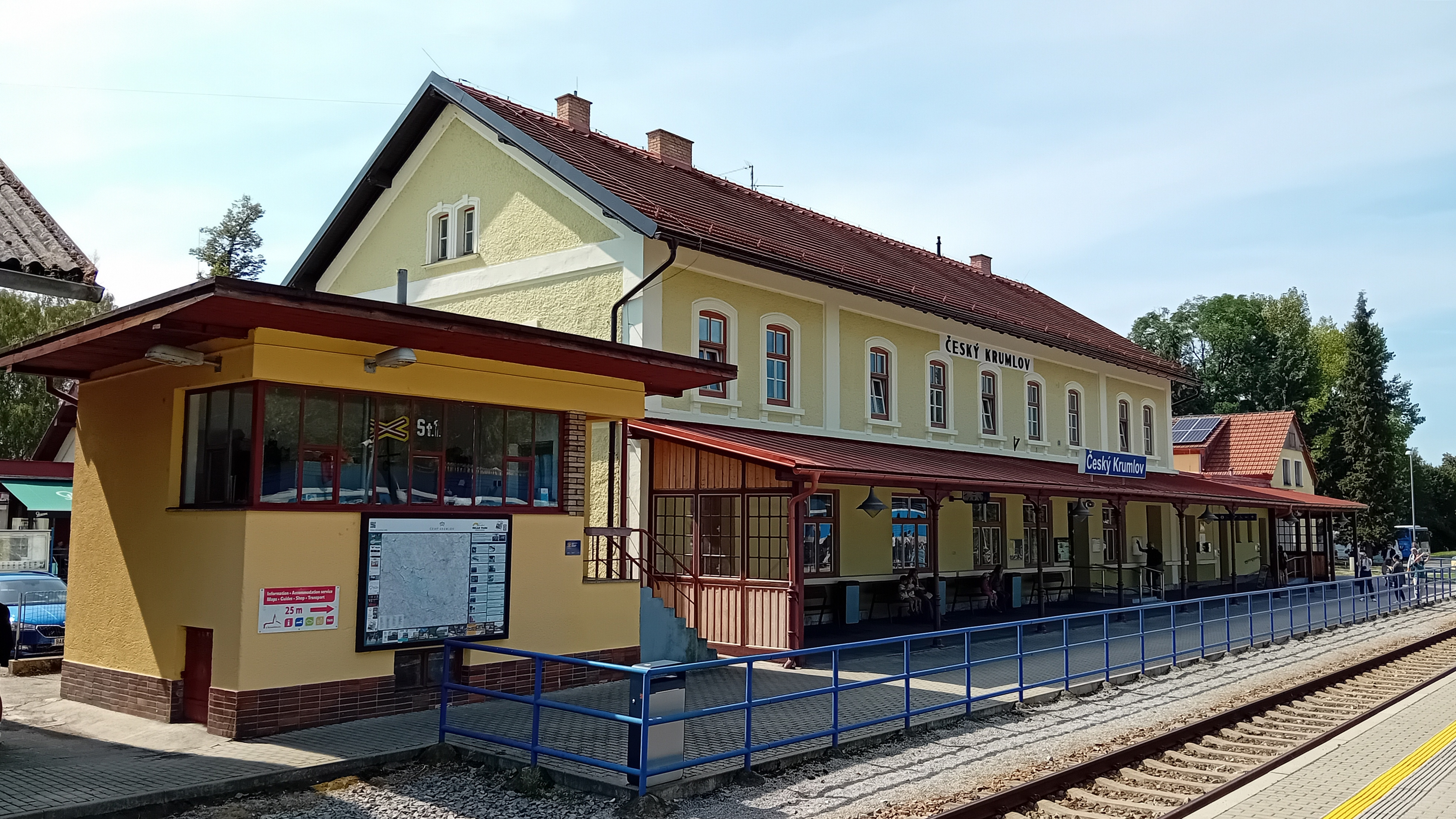
Český Krumlov railway station

The I/39 road from České Budějovice to Volary passes through the town. The town has direct bus connections with Prague, Linz, Salzburg and Munich.

Český Krumlov is located on the České Budějovice–Černý Kříž railway and as of 2026 it is served by the intraregional line Prague–Český Krumlov and the regional line České Budějovice–Nové Údolí. The town is served by two railway stations: Český Krumlov and Domoradice.

== Culture ==
Český Krumlov hosts a number of festivals and other events each year including the Five-Petalled Rose Festival (a reference to the rose of the Rosenberg crest), which is held on the summer solstice weekend. The downtown area is turned into a medieval town with craftsmen, artists, musicians, and local people in medieval costume. Activities include jousting, fencing, historical dance performances, and folk theatre, in the castle precincts and along the river. It concludes with a fireworks display.

The International Music Festival Český Krumlov begins in July and ends in August, and features international music of various genres. It has been held annually since 1992. Other such events are held throughout the year. The summer music festivals include the blues, rock, and soul festival Open Air Krumlov, held in late June at Eggenberg Brewery Garden.

== Sights ==
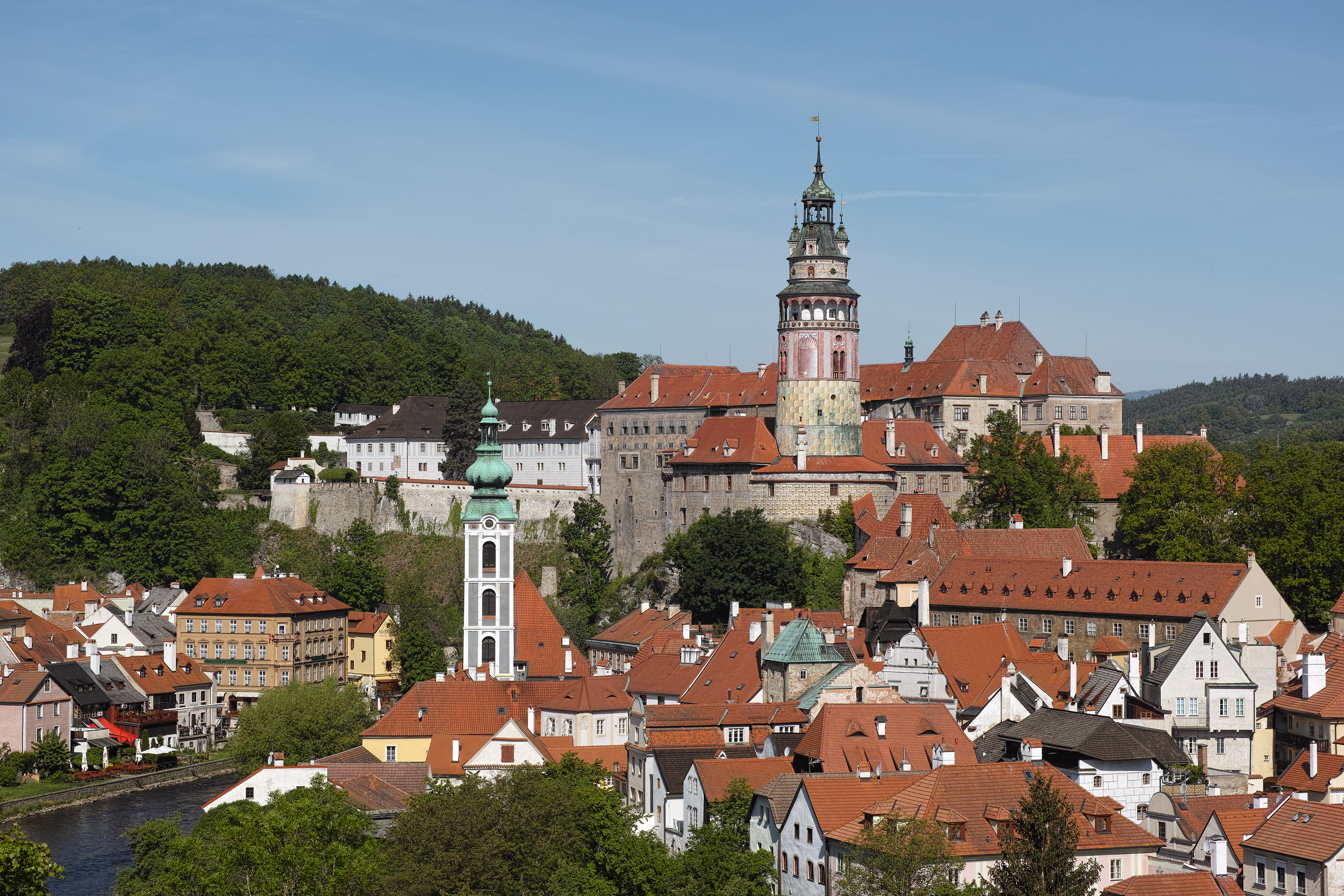
Historic centre with the castle

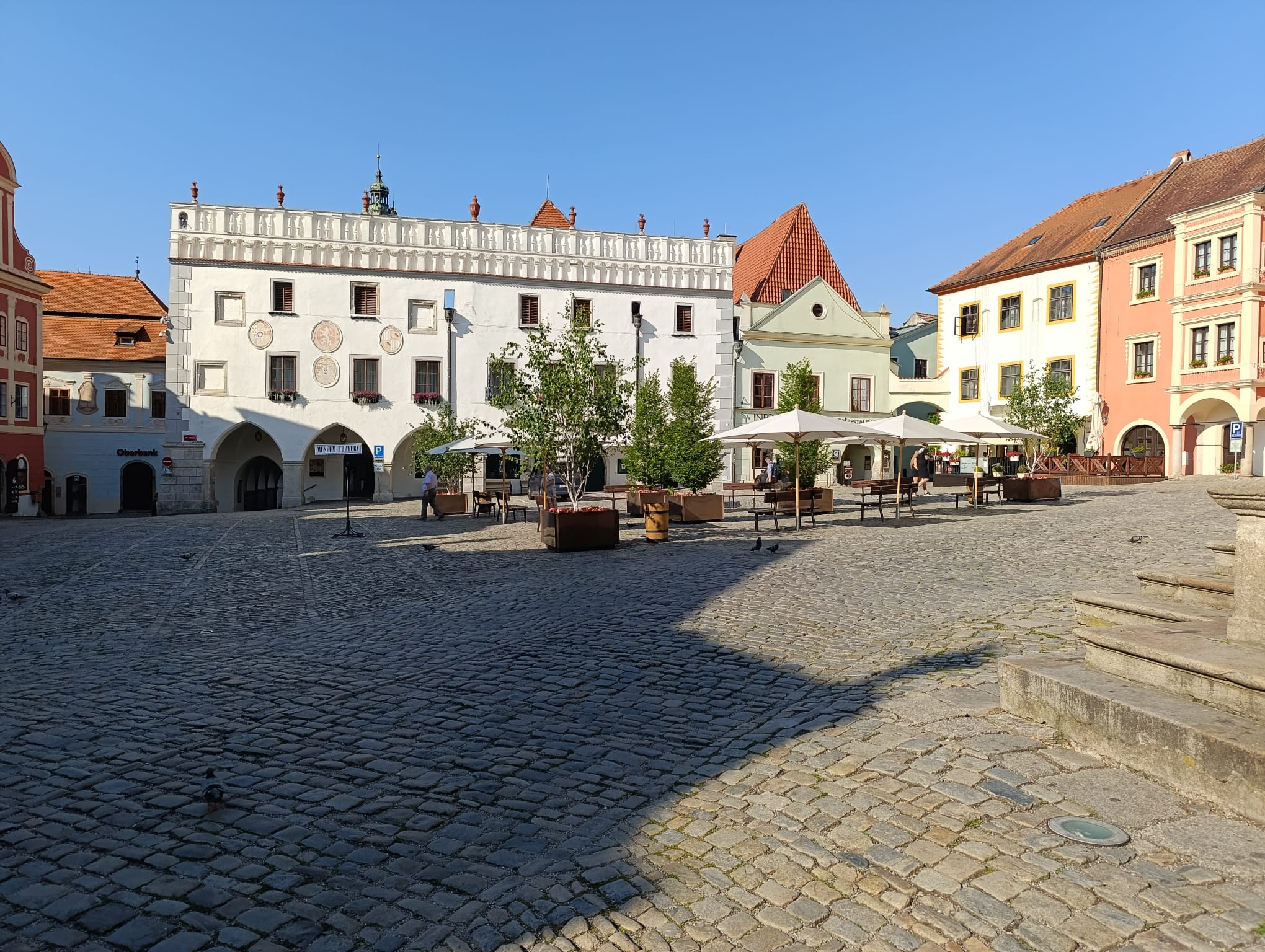
Town hall on Náměstí Svornosti

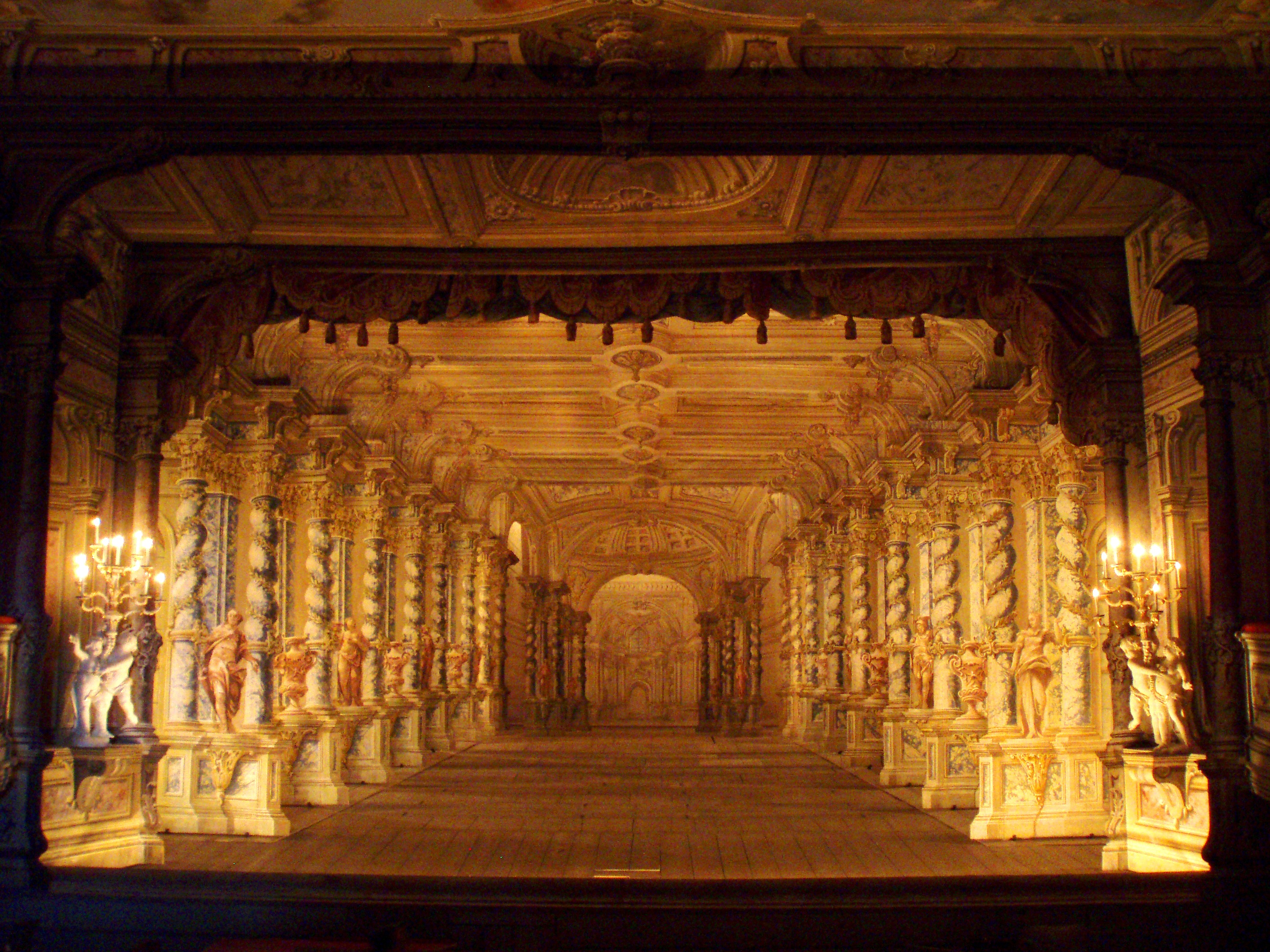
The stage of the castle theatre

The historic town centre with the castle complex has been a designated UNESCO World Heritage Site since 1992, one of the first in the country. The town preserves the street layout from the Middle Ages. Most of the architecture of the old town and castle dates from the 13th through 17th centuries; the town's structures are mostly in Gothic, Renaissance, and Baroque styles. The historical core, today the municipal part Vnitřní město (lit. 'inner town'), is within a horseshoe meander of the river, with the old Latrán town part and castle complex on the other side of the Vltava.

The centre of Old Town is formed by the square Náměstí Svornosti. Its main landmark is the town hall from 1597. It was created by merger of three Gothic houses with arcades, whose façade was merged with a Renaissance attic.

The town has preserved only few fragments of the town fortifications, formed by one town gate built in 1598–1602, a bastion from 1505, and remains of zwinger walls.

=== Castle and castle theatre ===
The complex of Český Krumlov Castle is one of the largest in central Europe with an area of 7 hectares (17 acres). It is formed by forty buildings and palaces, situated around five castle courts and a castle park.

It is relatively unique in that it is surrounded by a moat filled not with water, but with bears. This was an attempt by the erstwhile rulers of the castle to associate themselves with the powerful Orsini family – whose name is a pun on the Italian word for bear; orso.

Český Krumlov Castle preserves its Baroque theatre, built in 1680–1682 under Prince Johann Christian I of Eggenberg and renovated with up-to-date stage equipment under Joseph I Adam of Schwarzenberg in 1765–1766. It is the oldest of the four theaters from the 18th century in the world that have preserved scenery, props and stage machinery. Due to its age, the theatre only hosts performances on special occasions. The equipment of the theatre is protected as a national cultural monument.

Since 1959, the revolving auditorium is located in the gardens of the Český Krumlov Castle.

=== Ecclesiastical buildings ===
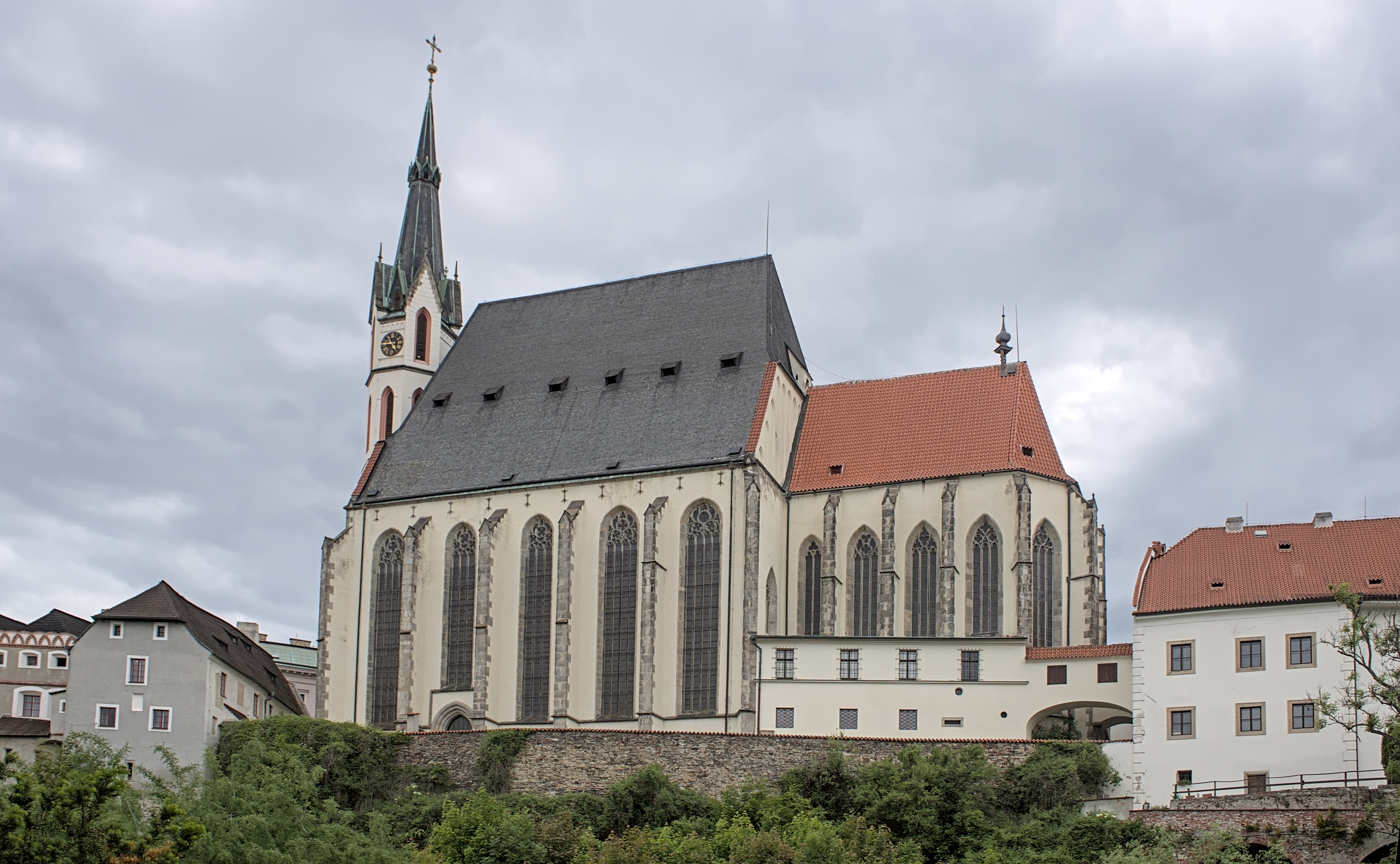
Church of Saint Vitus

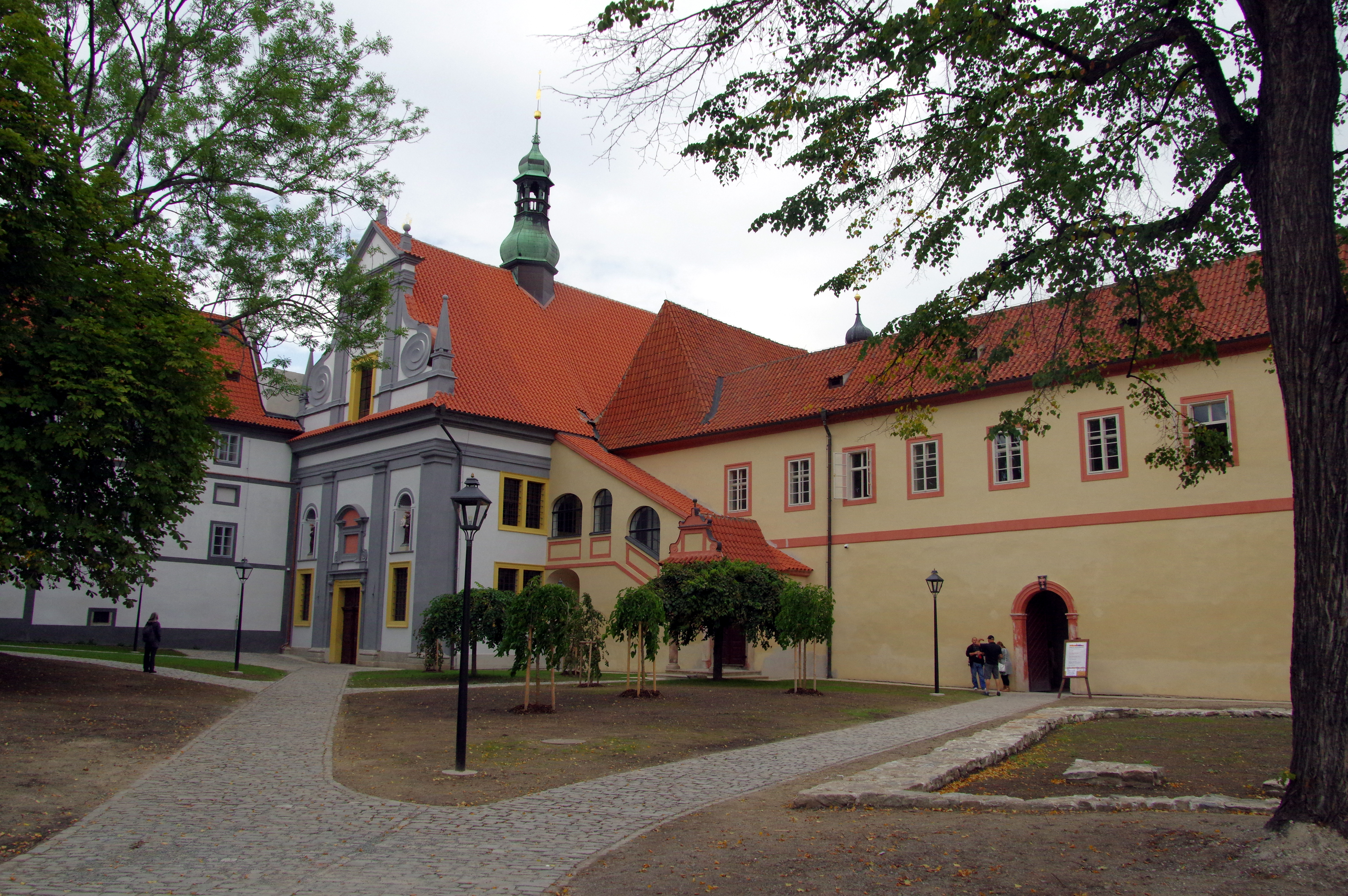
Church of the Corpus Christi and the Virgin Mary in the monastery complex

The most valuable church and a national cultural monument is the Church of Saint Vitus. It is a late Gothic structure from 1407–1439 with later modifications, built on the foundations of an older church from 1309. It is accessible to the public and it is still used for religious and cultural purposes.

The former Church of Saint Judoc in Latrán was abolished in 1787 or 1788. Today it is used for housing and shopping purposes. The tower is accessible and serves as a lookout tower.

The Church of the Corpus Christi and the Virgin Mary is located in complex of three monasteries in Latrán. The complex was opened in 2015 after extensive reconstruction. It includes the former monasteries of Friars Minor, Poor Clares, and Beguines.

The Český Krumlov Synagogue is an Art Nouveau building with Neo-Romanesque features. It was built in 1908 and closed in 1938. Today it is used for cultural purposes.

=== Lazebnický most ===
The bridge Lazebnický most connects the Latrán area and the Old Town. Its current design probably dates from 1834. The bridge stands on a central pillar and two stone abutments that hold the steel structure. The bridge is decorated with a statue of St. John of Nepomuck and a cross.

=== Museums ===
Český Krumlov has a museum and gallery dedicated to the painter Egon Schiele, who lived in the town, the Egon Schiele Art Centrum. In the town centre there is a museum dedicated to the semi-precious gemstone moldavite.

Other museums include Castle Museum with the Castle Tower, Regional Museum in Český Krumlov, Museum of Marionettes, Wax Figures Museum, Museums of Torture Law, Český Krumlov Monasteries Museum, Museum Fotoateliér Seidel (a museum of photography) and Museum of Historical Motorcycles.

== In popular culture ==
Český Krumlov has been used for locations in movies and TV series such as The Adventures of Pinocchio (1996), The Scarlet Pimpernel (1999), Hostel (2005), and The Illusionist (2006).

== Notable people ==
- Joseph Karl Ambrosch (1759–1822), opera singer
- Christoph Feldegg (1779–1845), Austrian army officer and naturalist
- Egon Schiele (1890–1918), Austrian painter; lived here
- Karel Šmirous (1890–1981), scientist
- Franz Suchomel (1907–1979), Nazi war criminal
- Petr Eben (1929–2007), composer
- Karl Riha (1935–2026), German poet, writer and literary scholar
- Anna Chromy (1940–2021), painter and sculptor
- Dana Kuchtová (born 1961), politician
- Luděk Sekyra (born 1964), businessman
- Petr Muk (1965–2010), pop singer
- Tomáš Kobes (born 1978), slalom canoeist
- Jan Matura (born 1980), ski jumper

== International relations ==
=== Twin towns – sister cities ===
Český Krumlov is twinned with:

- Hauzenberg, Germany
- Kalush, Ukraine
- Llanwrtyd Wells, Wales, United Kingdom
- Miami Beach, United States
- San Gimignano, Italy
- Slovenj Gradec, Slovenia
- Vöcklabruck, Austria

=== Friendly towns and cities ===
Český Krumlov has friendly relations with:

- Cusco, Peru
- Dubrovnik, Croatia
- Kuressaare, Estonia
- Linz, Austria

== Gallery ==
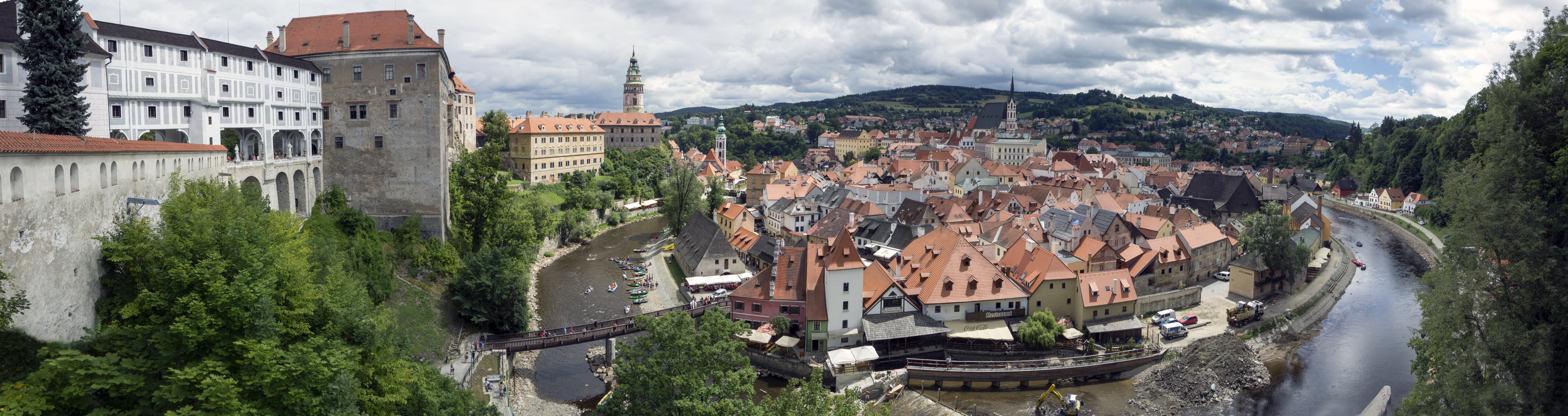
View from the castle gardens
