= Peter I of Rosenberg =

Bohemian nobleman (d. 1347)

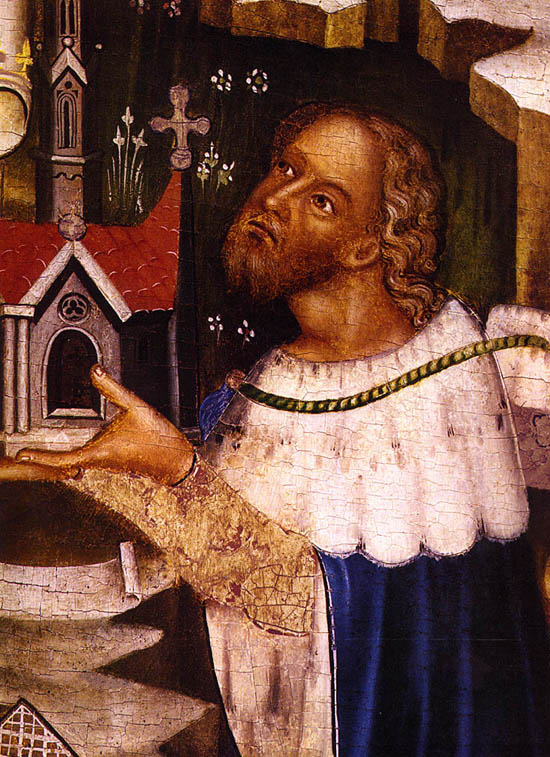
- Peter I of Rosenberg by the Master of Vyšší Brod from the altarpiece at Vyšší Brod

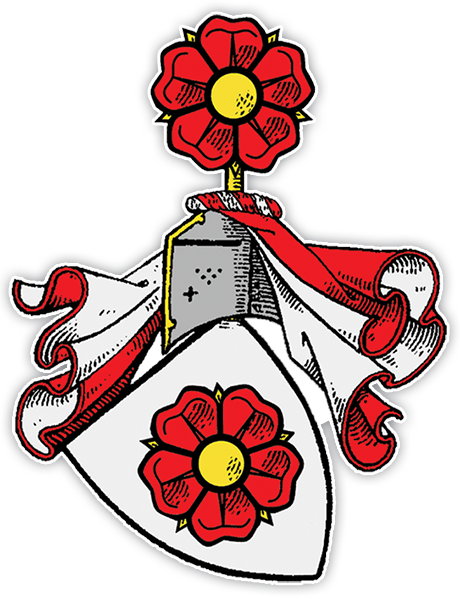
- Coat of arms
- Native name: Petr I. z Rožmberka
- Died: 14 October 1347
- Buried: Vyšší Brod Monastery
- Noble family: Rosenberg family
- Wives: Viola of Teschen (died 1317); Kateřina of Vartemberk
- Issue: Henry II of Rosenberg; Peter II of Rosenberg; Oldřich I of Rosenberg; Jošt I of Rosenberg; John I of Rosenberg; Mecela of Rosenberg; Anna of Rosenberg; daughter of unknown name
- Father: Henry I of Rosenberg
- Mother: Eliška of Dobruška

Peter I of Rosenberg (Czech: Petr I. z Rožmberka; died 14 October 1347) was lord chamberlain of the Kingdom of Bohemia, who acted as regent during John of Bohemia's absences at war between 1339 and 1346. He was a patron of Vyšší Brod Monastery and is thought to have commissioned the Master of Vyšší Brod altarpiece. In 1316 he married Viola of Teschen, former queen consort (wife of king Wenceslaus III).
