= Rosenberg family =

Bohemian noble family

Rosenberg Rožmberkové Páni z Rožmberka
- Origin: Rožmberk nad Vltavou, Bohemia
- Founded: 1250
- Estate: Rožmberk Castle

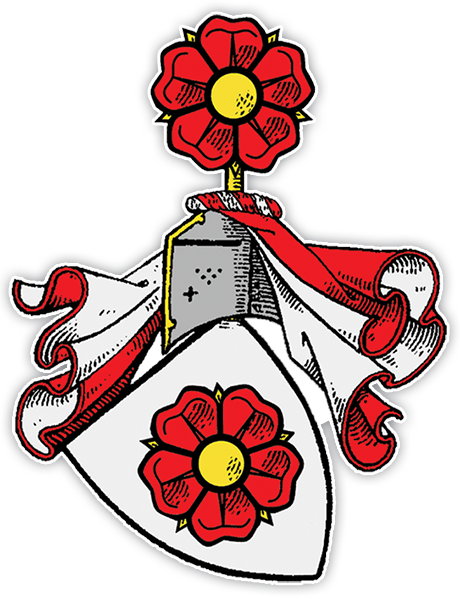
Original arms of the family

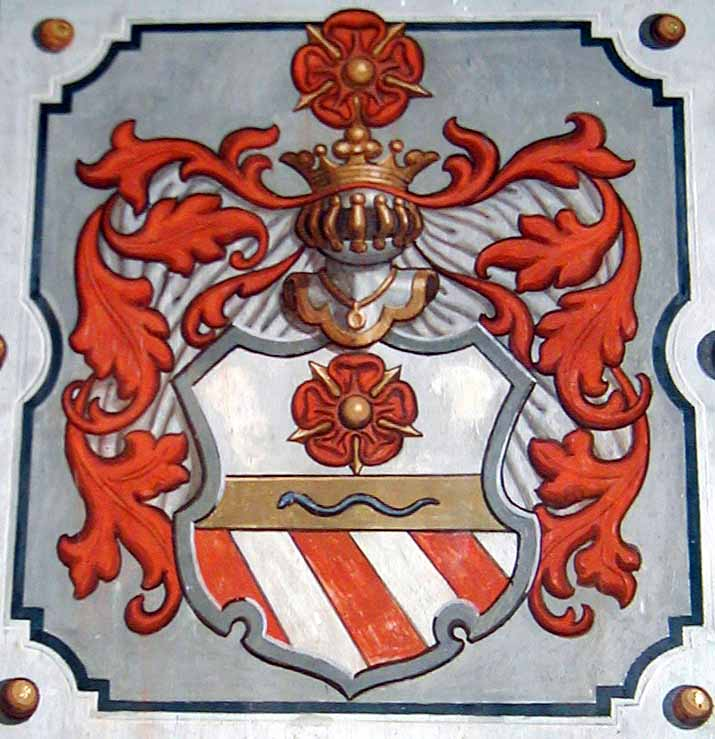
Later arms of the Rosenbergs, with elements from the Orsini family arms

The House of Rosenberg (Czech: Rožmberkové or Páni z Rožmberka) was a prominent Bohemian noble family of probable White Croatian origin that played an important role in Czech medieval history from the 13th century until 1611. Members of this family held posts at the Prague royal (and later imperial) court, and were viewed as very powerful lords of the Kingdom of Bohemia. This branch of the Vítkovci clan was initially founded by Vítek III, the son of Witiko of Prčice.

== History ==
Around 1250, the Vítkovci clan settled at the Rožmberk Castle in the region of Český Krumlov, then about 1253 erected the Český Krumlov Castle. The Český Krumlov Castle thus became the residence of the Lords of Rosenbergs for the next three hundred years. It was the Rosenbergs who influenced the appearance of southern Bohemia to a great extent. The coat of arms and emblem of this family was represented by a red five-petalled rose on a silver field, which is still often seen in a considerable part of southern Bohemia.

Peter I of Rosenberg held the post of the superior chamberlain at the court of John of Bohemia. His wife was a widow of the Bohemian King Wenceslaus III.

Another significant personage of the family was Jindřich III of Rosenberg, a son of Oldřich I of Rosenberg, who led the League of Lords, being displeased during the reign of King Wenceslaus IV.

Jindřich's son, Oldřich II of Rosenberg, was a member of the Bohemian nobility who defended the interests of Bohemian catholic nobility and of Sigismund, Holy Roman Emperor, during the times of the Hussite Wars.

A daughter of Oldřich II was Perchta of Rosenberg, who is identified with the Rosenbergs "White Lady" ghost tales, and current residents of the area still report seeing Perchta's spirit around the castle.

The decline of the House of Rosenberg began with William and Peter Vok, the sons of Jošt III, both being raised under the guardianship of their uncle, Peter V.

William of Rosenberg is generally considered the most significant representative of the family, making the Český Krumlov area the centre of southern Bohemian cultural and political life.

After William's death in 1592, his younger brother Peter Vok assumed the position of reigning lord. In 1601, he was forced to sell the Krumlov castle to Rudolf II, Holy Roman Emperor. Peter Vok transferred his residence after the sale to Třeboň, where he died in 1611. Peter Vok brought to a close the three-hundred-year-long reign of this illustrious dynasty.

== See also ==
- Orsini family (Italy)
- Orsini-Rosenberg family (Austria)
