= Žižkův vojenský řád =

Žižkův vojenský řád (English: Žižka's Military Order or Žižka's regulations of war) is a list of rules and regulations that the Hussite field armies were to follow. It was written in 1423 shortly after the Battle of Hořice. A copy has survived from the beginning of the second half of the 16th century. Jan Žižka himself is considered to be the author or co-author (sometimes his authorship is questioned). The order was created mainly to make the army obedient. Due to disobedience, the Hussite armies suffered unnecessary losses in both soldiers and weapons and property ("in brothers and property"). The Orebí nobility in particular pledged to defend the order at all costs and to take tough action against anyone who would evade it.

== List of rules ==
1. If the army moves from its place and rushes to a new camp, every soldier must obey his hetman without exception. If anyone opposes this, he will be punished, which may not be a fine, but preferably physical punishment or even execution.
2. As soon as the army moves from the camp, it must leave together and as a whole. That is, the first ones must go at such a pace that the last ones can keep up and the army does not get torn apart.
3. When the army is lying in wait or marching somewhere, it is not possible for everyone to set fire to the surrounding houses, but only some will be designated to do so. Anyone who still disobeys will face a heavy fine.
4. Before the army moves from the camp, everyone must unconditionally pray to God.
5. When everyone has prayed, the hetmans divide the army into ranks and companies, and the soldiers will march under one banner all day long. No one may defect or mix with another banner than the one under which they set out.
6. If someone makes a mistake and because of his carelessness the army is damaged or defeated, he will be punished. In addition, he will be executed and his property will be confiscated.
7. However, if victory comes, all the booty will be gathered into one pile and carefully divided. If someone steals something, he will be punished both in terms of property and in terms of his life.
8. All arguments, fights, quarrels and swearing are forbidden.
9. If someone beats, wounds, cripples or kills someone, he will be punished according to the law of God, so that he will be harmed in the same way.
10. If someone tries to escape from the army, he will be punished like a common thief, both on his neck and on his property.
11. The following people will also be punished, whom we do not want among us: liars, thieves, dice players, robbers and thieves, drunkards, gossips, prostitutes and adulterers, in other words, all sinners.
12. All men assigned to this purpose will be punished in the following ways: beating, whipping, killing, beheading, hanging, boiling, burning, stretching. These punishments apply to everyone equally; to the master and the peasant, to the male and the female sex.
