= Conquest of Kutná Hora =

Military operation in Bohemia (1402–1403)

- Part of the Moravian Margrave Wars
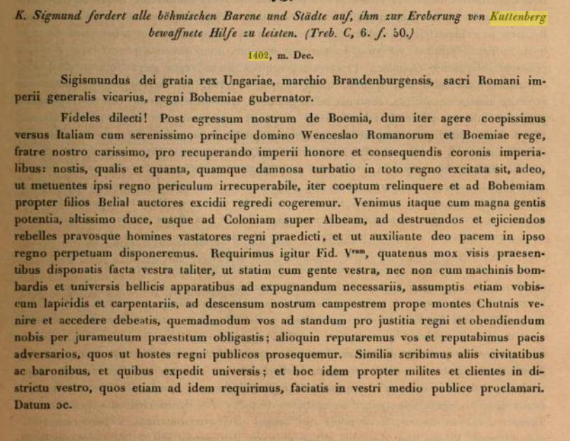
- Copy of a letter from King Sigismund of Luxembourg calling for the siege of Kutná Hora
Date	December 1402 – January 1403
Location	Area surrounding Kutná Hora, Kingdom of Bohemia
Result	Victory of Sigismund of Hungary over his brother Wenceslaus IV; The devastation of Čakovice, Ratboř, and Nebovidy; Capture of Žleby and the city of Kutná Hora; Plundering of the royal treasures of Wenceslaus IV; Regional looting and pillaging

Belligerents
Kingdom of Bohemia	Kingdom of Hungary; City of Prague

Commanders and leaders
Wenceslaus IV of Bohemia; Conrad of Vechta	Sigismund of Luxembourg; Markvart of Úlice; Mikeš Divůček of Jemniště

The conquest of Kutná Hora was a military operation that took place between December 1402 and January 1403 by the forces of Sigismund of Luxembourg, King of Hungary, focused on capturing the city of Kutná Hora and the surrounding area, a stronghold of support for King Wenceslaus IV of Bohemia. The campaign was an important episode in the Moravian Margrave Wars and a decisive victory of Sigismund.

== Context ==
In March 1402, Sigismund captured his brother Wenceslaus, the titular King of Bohemia. This sparked a revolt among a faction of the nobility in the Kingdom of Bohemia led by Margrave Jobst of Moravia. Wenceslaus was imprisoned in Vienna that August, and Sigismund launched a campaign in December to suppress regions loyal to Wenceslaus. Kutná Hora, an important mining town and center of regional wealth, was specifically targeted for its strategic value.

From his camp near Kolín, Sigismund summoned the local lords, knights, and city leaders to join their levies and siege equipment to his campaign, threatening severe reprisals if they refused.

The city of Prague responded to the call by sending a contingent led by Markvart of Úlice. The League of Lords also lent military support, as well as the lord Mikeš Divůček of Jemniště. Sigismund brought an army of Cuman mercenaries from Hungary, who sowed terror in the area around Poděbrady, Kolín, and Kutná Hora. Sigismund's army, numbered around 20,000, comprised Hungarians, Cumans, and local allies.

== Order of battle ==
The siege began on 3 December 1402, when a contingent of Sigismund's army encircled Kutná Hora. Under the command of Conrad of Vechta, the defenders resisted resolutely, engaging in several fierce battles before the walls. The clashes resulted in significant losses, but precise details of the battles are lacking in historical accounts.

On 24 December part of the Prague forces began the Siege of Suchdol, where their commander, Markvart of Úlice, was killed by an arrow on 27 December. Faced with Sigismund's numerical superiority, the inhabitants of Kutná Hora sought the intervention of allied lords to negotiate a surrender with the League of Lords. In January 1403, the town capitulated, and its representatives were forced to go to Kolín to beg Sigismund for mercy, accepting humiliating terms.

== Consequences ==
The campaign saw the devastation and capture of several additional strongholds loyal to Wenceslaus. While Sigismund was unable to prevail during his Siege of Kolín and Siege of Poděbrady, the areas around these cities were laid to waste. The destruction of Čakovice, for instance, was so complete that the village was never resettled. Sigismund was successful in the Battle of Ratboř and Siege of Žleby, further diminishing Wenceslaus' influence on the region.

The fall of Kutná Hora enabled Sigismund to seize Wenceslaus' royal treasures, including a valuable crown and precious gold and silver objects. He imposed an exorbitant fine on the town, while his troops continued their pillaging in the surrounding regions until February, leaving a lasting memory of their depredations. During his occupation, Sigismund removed Conrad of Vechta as Supreme Mintmaster, and installed Oldřich Vavák of Hradec in his place. (Note: Differentiated from Oldřich the Younger Vavák of Hradec, appointed Supreme Mintmaster in 1421)^{:99}

Wenceslaus estimated his losses at a sum equivalent to several million modern Czech korunas. Although Sigismund strengthened his temporary control, the abuses of his army fueled persistent resistance against him in the kingdom throughout 1403.
