= Moravian Margrave Wars =

Series of conflicts in Moravia between 1381 and 1405

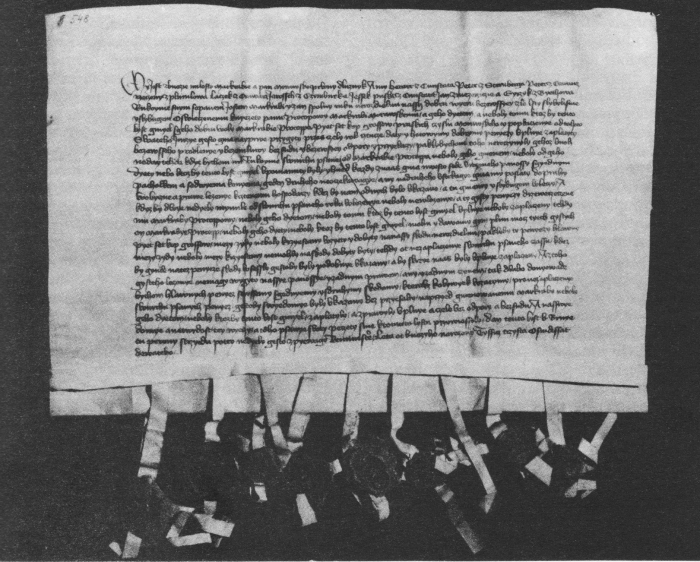
- Document declaring that Margrave Jobst and his Moravian allies promised to repay a debt of 500 kopecks to Margrave Prokop, written on 13 March 1389.
Date	1381–1405
Location	Margraviate of Moravia, Lands of the Bohemian Crown, Holy Roman Empire
Result	Jobst of Luxembourg becoming the sole lord of Moravia

Belligerents
Moravian Margraviate; Kingdom of Hungary; Duchy of Austria	Moravian Margraviate; Kingdom of Bohemia; Duchies of Silesia

Commanders and leaders
Jobst of Luxembourg (before 1402); William I of Meissen (before 1402); Sigismund of Luxembourg; Albert III of Austria #; Albert IV of Austria X; Henry III of Rosenberg; Supported by: League of Lords	Prokop of Luxembourg (POW): Wenceslaus IV of Bohemia; John of Görlitz X; John Sokol of Lamberg; Hynek I Suchý Čert of Kunštát and Jevišovice; Jobst of Luxembourg (after 1402); William I of Meissen (after 1402)

The Moravian Margrave Wars were a turbulent period of fighting, skirmishes, robbery, and lawlessness that took place especially in Moravia between 1381 and 1405. Initially a dispute between brothers Jobst and Prokop of Luxembourg, it developed into a greater power struggle within the House of Luxembourg. Through the involvement of their cousins Wenceslaus IV of Bohemia, Sigismund of Luxembourg, and John of Görlitz, fighting spilled out of Moravia and into several proxy wars within neighboring kingdoms.

== Prelude ==
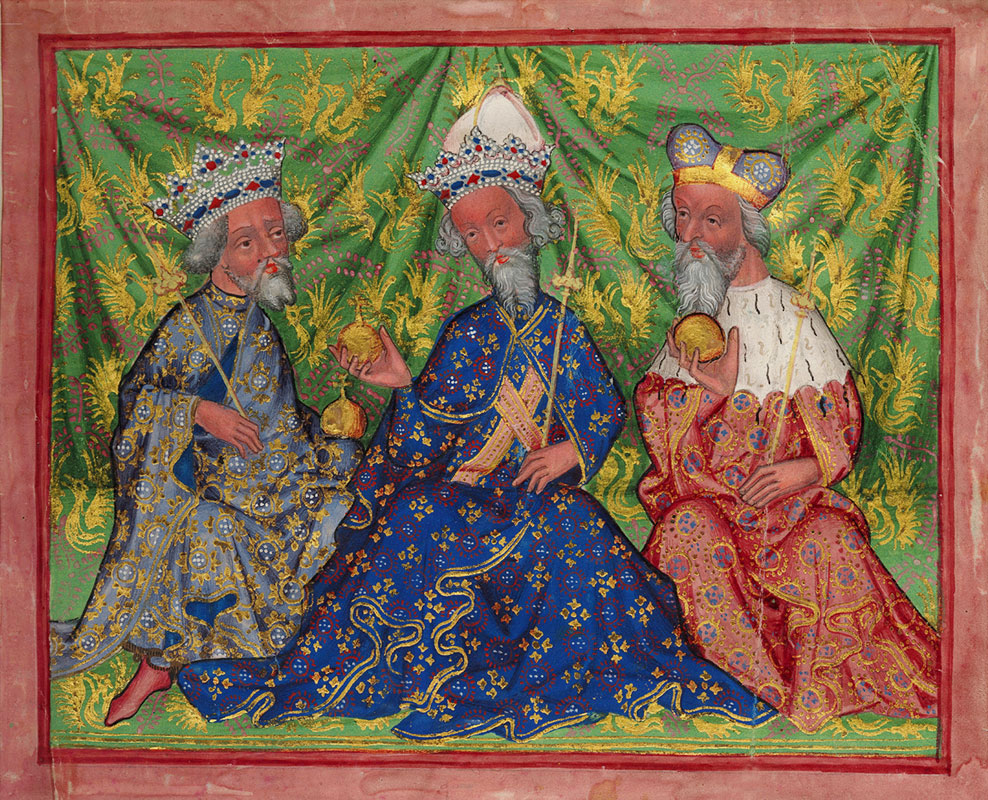
Wenceslaus IV, Charles IV, and Jobst of Moravia (Olomouc Law Book, c. 1430)

John Henry, Margrave of Moravia had three notable sons; Jobst, John Sobieslaw, and Prokop. Upon his death, Jobst and John Sobieslaw quarreled over their inheritance, with the latter attacking and illegally occupying estates belonging to Jobst. Their issues were settled in 1377 after mediation by their uncle Charles IV, Holy Roman Emperor. The three brothers thereafter jointly ruled as Margraves of Moravia.

After the death of Charles IV in 1378, order began to gradually collapse both in the Lands of the Bohemian Crown and in the Holy Roman Empire. In his will, Charles attempted to unite the family through fair distribution of lands to his sons Wenceslaus, Sigismund, and John.

Wenceslaus was made King of Bohemia and crowned King of the Romans. Sigismund, newly Margrave of Brandenburg, was financially backed by Jobst and went on to seize the throne of Hungary.

== First Margrave War ==
After the death of John Sobieslaw in 1380, Jobst and Prokop had a dispute about the inheritance. In his will, John Sobieslaw left his estates to Prokop. However, Jobst rejected this and occupied some of the lands instead. Fighting began in 1381, and Prokop conquered Tepenec Castle with the help of his commanders Jindřich of Nevojice and Unka of Majetín. Prokop attempted to take control Olomouc, but failed. The dispute ended in September 1382.

The elder Margrave Jobst settled with Prokop after arbitration. This was followed by a period of relative calm and cooperation in the 1380s.

== Second Margrave War ==
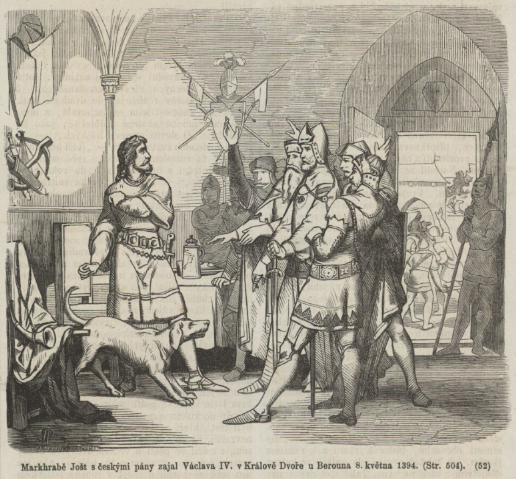
The 1394 capture of Wenceslaus by Margrave Jobst (Česko-moravská kronika, 1868)

In the 1390s, two coalitions began to form; one of Margrave Prokop, King Wenceslaus IV, and Polish King Władysław II Jagiełło, and one of Margrave Jobst, King Sigismund, and Albert III, Duke of Austria.

Jobst and Prokop began warring again in 1393. They fought not only in Moravia, but also in Brandenburg with their alliances. The brothers campaigned in Poland as well, with Jobst supporting Vladislaus II of Opole and Prokop supporting Władysław II Jagiełło. Peace negotiations began in October 1393, but fell through after the poisoning of Wenceslaus and Frederick, Duke of Bavaria. Frederick died, and suspicion fell on Sigismund and Jobst.

In December 1393, Jobst secured an alliance with his brother-in-law, William I of Meissen. Jobst also collaborated with the League of Lords, a coalition of upper nobility that served as a militant opposition group to the rule of Wenceslaus. In 1394, the League of Lords captured and imprisoned Wenceslaus. Jobst was declared provincial governor, meanwhile Prokop and John of Görlitz worked to free Wenceslaus. John managed to raise an army of crown loyalists and negotiated the king's release on 1 August 1394.

In 1395, troops led by Henry III of Rosenberg attacked the royal properties of Kuglvajt, Vodňany, and České Budějovice. John and Sigismund continued to mediate disputes.

The crown was put in debt during Wenceslaus' imprisonment. In January 1396, John was chastised by the king for the debts that he had accrued, and he subsequently left the kingdom. John suspiciously died in his sleep a month later at the age of 25. That May, Wenceslaus briefly arrested Margrave Jobst and six members of the League and sued for peace.

== Third Margrave War ==
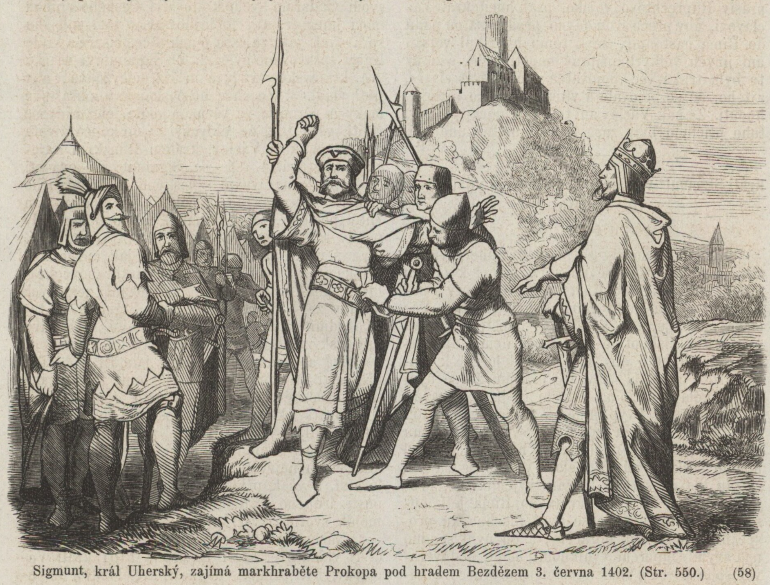
The 1402 capture of Prokop by Sigismund (Česko-moravská kronika, 1868)

=== 1398–1400 ===
The war resumed in 1398, reignited by Prokop. After the death of the Olomouc bishop Nicholas of Riesenburg, Wenceslaus commissioned Prokop to manage the bishop's estates during the sede vacante. Prokop had all the bishop's castles occupied by his garrison and they thus became the support of Wenceslaus. The chapter defended itself by reporting the seizure of the episcopal estates to the Pope. Prokop, along with supporters such as John Sokol of Lamberg, were excommunicated in 1399.

Prokop seized territory, and his commander John Sokol began to raid around Moravia. One castle, Znojmo, was taken and Hynek I Suchý Čert of Kunštát and Jevišovice was named governor. In December 1399, Sigismund and his army crossed into Moravia after Jan XI Mráz, the bishop of Olomouc, requested aid. He successfully besieged Tepenec Castle among others.

There was a brief interruption after Sigismund left Moravia and was subsequently captured by the local nobility. In 1400, Wenceslaus lost the title King of the Romans to Rupert of the Palatinate.

=== 1402 ===
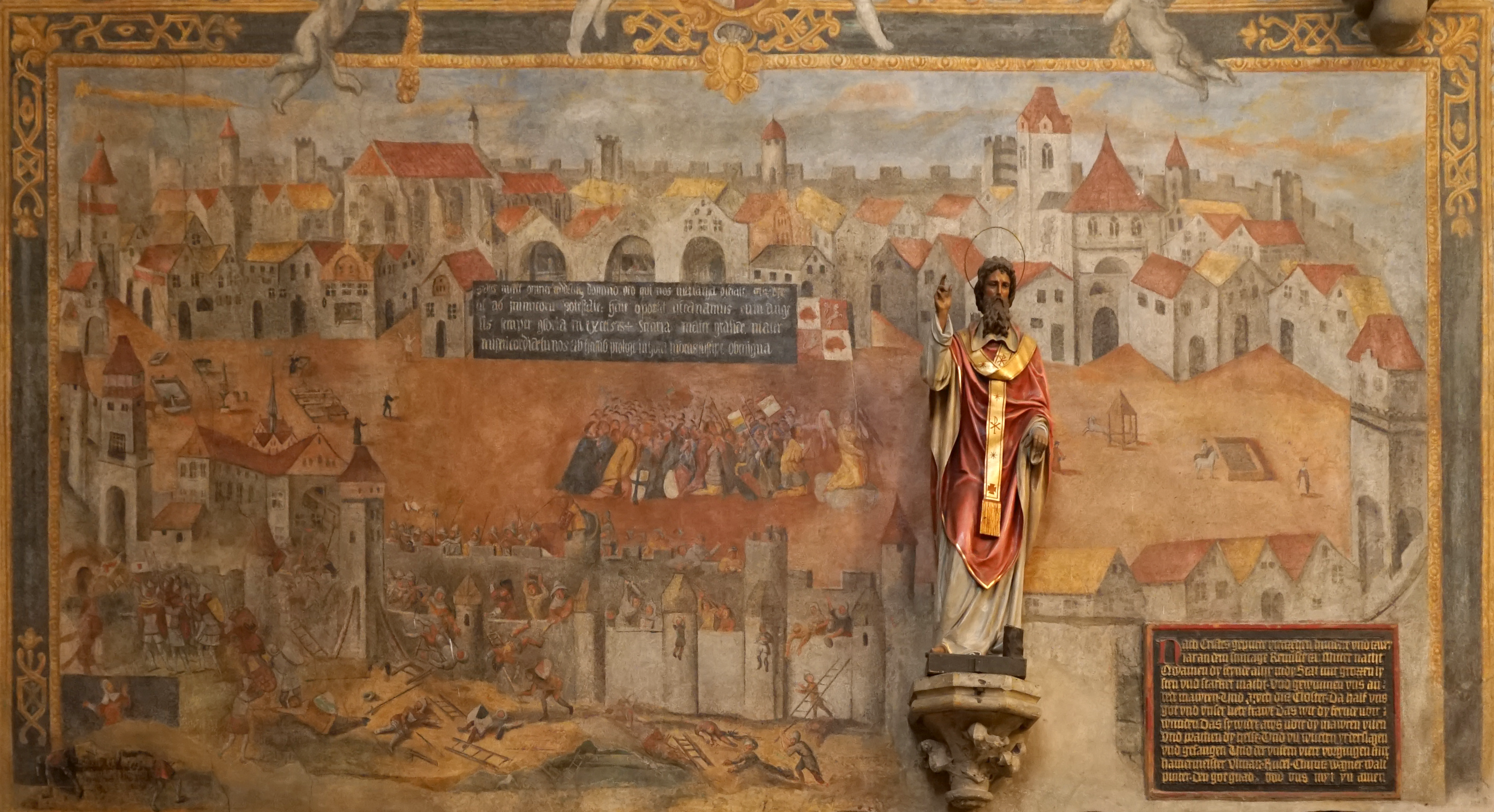
Fresco in Jihlava depicting the 1402 assault on the city

Prokop's commanders John Sokol and Zikmund of Křižanova led the failed Assault on Jihlava in February 1402. An attack by Prokop on Šumperk was a similar disappointment. Zikmund of Křižanova was later successful in capturing Jevíčko.

In March 1402, Wenceslaus was captured by his brother Sigismund. In June, by the joint action of Sigismund and Jobst, Prokop was lured out of Bezděz by trickery and then also captured and imprisoned. That same year, however, there was a fundamental turn in Jobst's politics. He broke with Sigismund, now leading the opposition to his rule. Allies were made in the Duchies of Silesia, and Wenceslaus' supporters started a greater resistance in Bohemia.

Sigismund initially intended to bring Wenceslaus to Rome, perhaps to challenge King Rupert, but instead had him imprisoned in Vienna. He brought Prokop to captivity in Bratislava. Sigismund remained in Hungary to suppress an uprising by his political rival Ladislaus of Naples. Unable to field an army with support from the Hungarian nobility, Sigismund marched back to Bohemia with an army of Cuman mercenaries.

In late 1402, Sigismund began his conquest of Kutná Hora, the location of the royal mint, to seize a portion of Wenceslaus' wealth and fund his own military. During this campaign, Sigismund's hetman Markvart of Úlice died leading the Siege of Suchdol against Wenceslaus' ally Petr Píšek. Several other villages and castles in the vicinity were conquered and razed, such as during the Battle of Ratboř against the levies of Martin Oderin. The campaign culminated with the successful capture of Kutná Hora, whereby much gold and silver was seized, and the city residents were made to beg for mercy. Meanwhile, Sigismund's army continued to commit atrocities in the region.

=== 1403–1405 ===
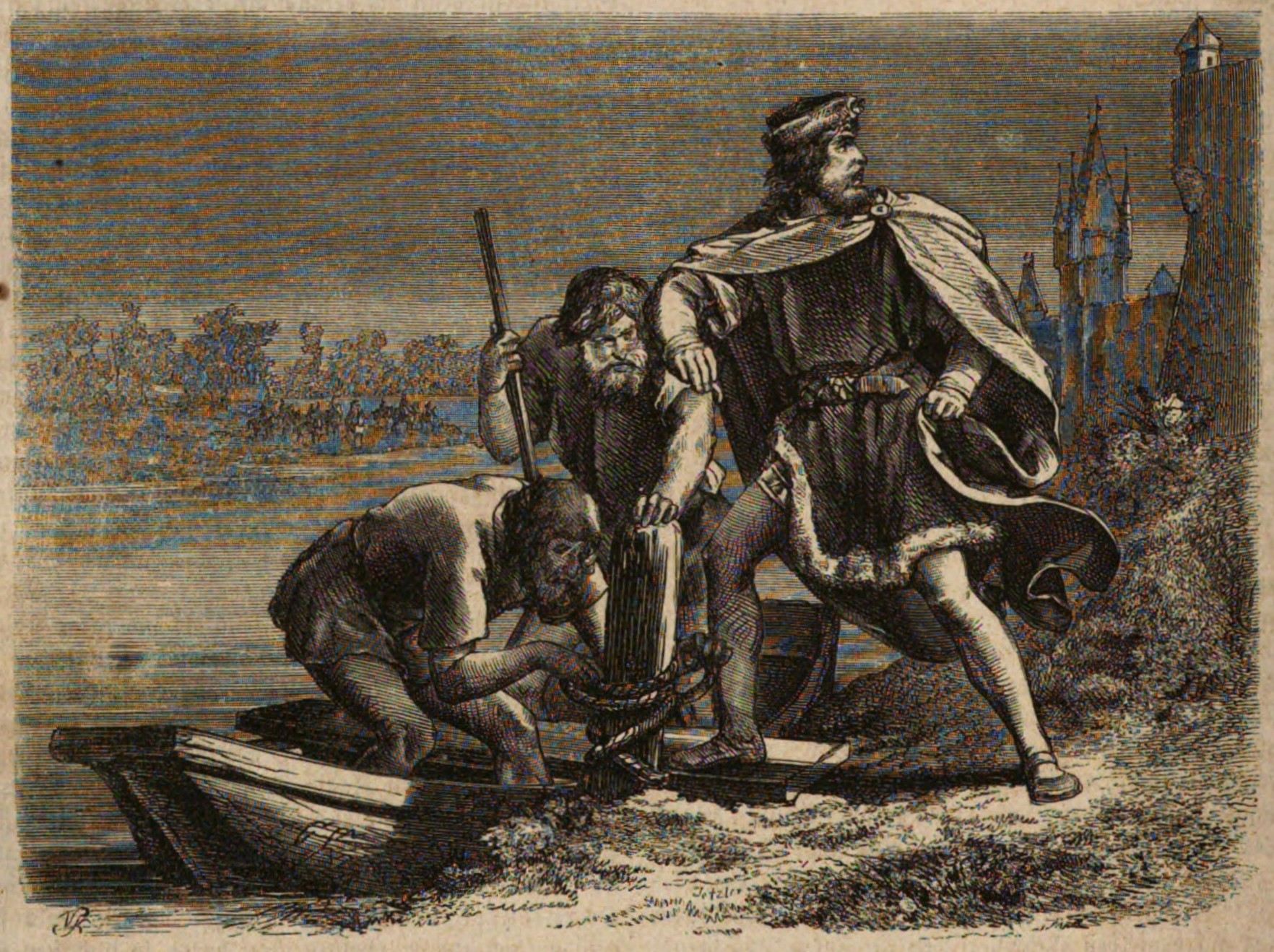
Wenceslaus escaping Vienna in 1403 (Vinzenz Katzler, 1862)

In 1403, Sigismund led an army to sack the silver-mining town of Stříbrná Skalice. He faced no resistance from the burgrave, Racek Kobyla, as Skalice was abandoned before his arrival. Sigismund went on to campaign against William I of Meissen, who had switched sides with Jobst. By the summer, Sigismund was forced to return to Hungary to again suppress Ladislaus of Naples. At the end of 1403, John II of Liechtenstein succeeded in helping Wenceslaus escape from prison in Vienna. Upon his return, Wenceslaus worked to overthrow the government installed by Sigismund, punishing those who rejected his rule and rewarding those who remained loyal.

In 1404, Sigismund returned to Moravia with his ally Albert IV of Austria. A decisive encounter took place in the summer of 1404 during the Siege of Znojmo by Sigismund's and Albert's troops. The city was held by Prokop's governors John Sokol and Hynek I Suchý Čert. After two months, the siege was lifted after disease ravaged the camps. Both Sigismund and Albert were allegedly poisoned by tainted peppercorn, and while Sigismund recovered, Albert died. Jobst, Wenceslaus, and Sigismund signed for peace in the spring of 1405. Prokop was subsequently freed from prison, but he was heavily weakened from his years spent in captivity. He died soon after his release on 4 September 1405.

== Aftermath ==
After the death of Prokop, Jobst of Luxembourg became the sole lord of Moravia and gradually came to terms with his cousins Wenceslaus and Sigismund. At the end of 1410, he briefly became King of the Romans, but he died in January 1411. Since he died like his brother Prokop without descendants, Moravia and the title of Margrave went to the King Wenceslaus IV. He permanently united the Bohemian Kingdom and the Moravian Margraviate in the person of one ruler, and appointed his hofmeister Lacek of Kravař and Helfštejn as provincial governor.

== Legacy ==
Czech historiography treats the wars as a structural precondition of the Hussite crisis that erupted after 1415. The financial and political strain on Wenceslaus IV weakened royal authority in Bohemia at the moment Jan Hus was becoming a national political issue, and Sigismund's repeated interventions during the wars created the adversarial relationship with the Bohemian estates that later complicated his claim to the Bohemian throne. The dynastic exhaustion of the Luxembourg line in Bohemia, visible in the fact that neither Jobst nor Prokop left heirs, is generally read as a direct consequence of the conflict.

== Cultural influence ==
The Passio raptorum de Slapanicz, secundum Bartoss, tortorem Brunnensem is a Latin literary treatment of a supposed historical event from Easter 1401, when the townspeople of Brno violently suppressed a group of robbers who were plaguing the village of Šlapanice. The story is presented with an abundant usage of phrases and allusions to the Gospels, which creates a comic effect. It has survived in a single manuscript from the late 15th century, stored in the National Library of the Czech Republic. The event described is not attested in any other source, and the text exhibits several fabricated features, such as a long list of at least partly fictional antagonists.

The Kingdom Come video game series is loosely based on events that occurred during the intervention of Sigismund of Hungary in Moravia and Bohemia between 1402 and 1403.
