= Siege of Suchdol =

1402 siege

- Part of the Moravian Margrave Wars
| Date | December 1402 – January 1403 |
| Location | Suchdol, Bohemia |
| Result | Royalist victory |

Belligerents
| Kingdom of Bohemia; Town of Suchdol | Kingdom of Hungary; City of Prague |

Commanders and leaders
| Petr Píšek | Markvart of Úlice † |

Casualties and losses
| Unknown but light | Unknown but heavy |

The Siege of Suchdol was a conflict during the Moravian Margrave Wars in December 1402. It was fought between the army of Petr Píšek, loyal to Wenceslaus IV of Bohemia, and the royalist armies of Prague under the command of Markvart of Úlice, loyal to Sigismund of Luxembourg. The effort ended in the capitulation of the town to the Prague army. The siege was part of the greater conquest of Kutná Hora.

== Context ==
In February 1402, Sigismund of Luxembourg took the opportunity to seize power in Bohemia. The League of Lords had Wenceslaus IV kidnapped and on 6 March 1402, Sigismund took him imprisoned to Vienna under Albert IV of Austria.

Sigismund launched an offensive that December with an army of Hungarian soldiers, reinforced by Cumans and Czech allies following the dispatch of his letter calling for mobilization, stationed near Kolín. He ordered lords, knights, and towns, under penalty of heavy punishment, to join him with their armed forces and siege engines to besiege Kutná Hora, a loyalist stronghold rich in royal treasures. Prague responded to the call, sending an army under the command of Markvart of Úlice, Governor of Prague, to support the war effort.

Markvart sought to take Suchdol Castle from the wealthy burgrave Petr Píšek and claim it as his own. He marched his contingent to the fortress, approximately 7 kilometres (4.3 mi) west of Kutná Hora.

== Battle ==
On 24 December 1402, Christmas Eve, the Prague forces led by Markvart of Úlice arrived at Suchdol, after having caused damage to the estate, and laid siege to the fortress defended by Petr Píšek. On 27 December, the feast day of St. John the Evangelist, Markvart of Úlice was fatally hit in the throat by an arrow fired from the fortress during an assault. He died on the spot. The fortress capitulated soon after, weakened by the impending fall of Kutná Hora in January 1403.

== Consequences ==
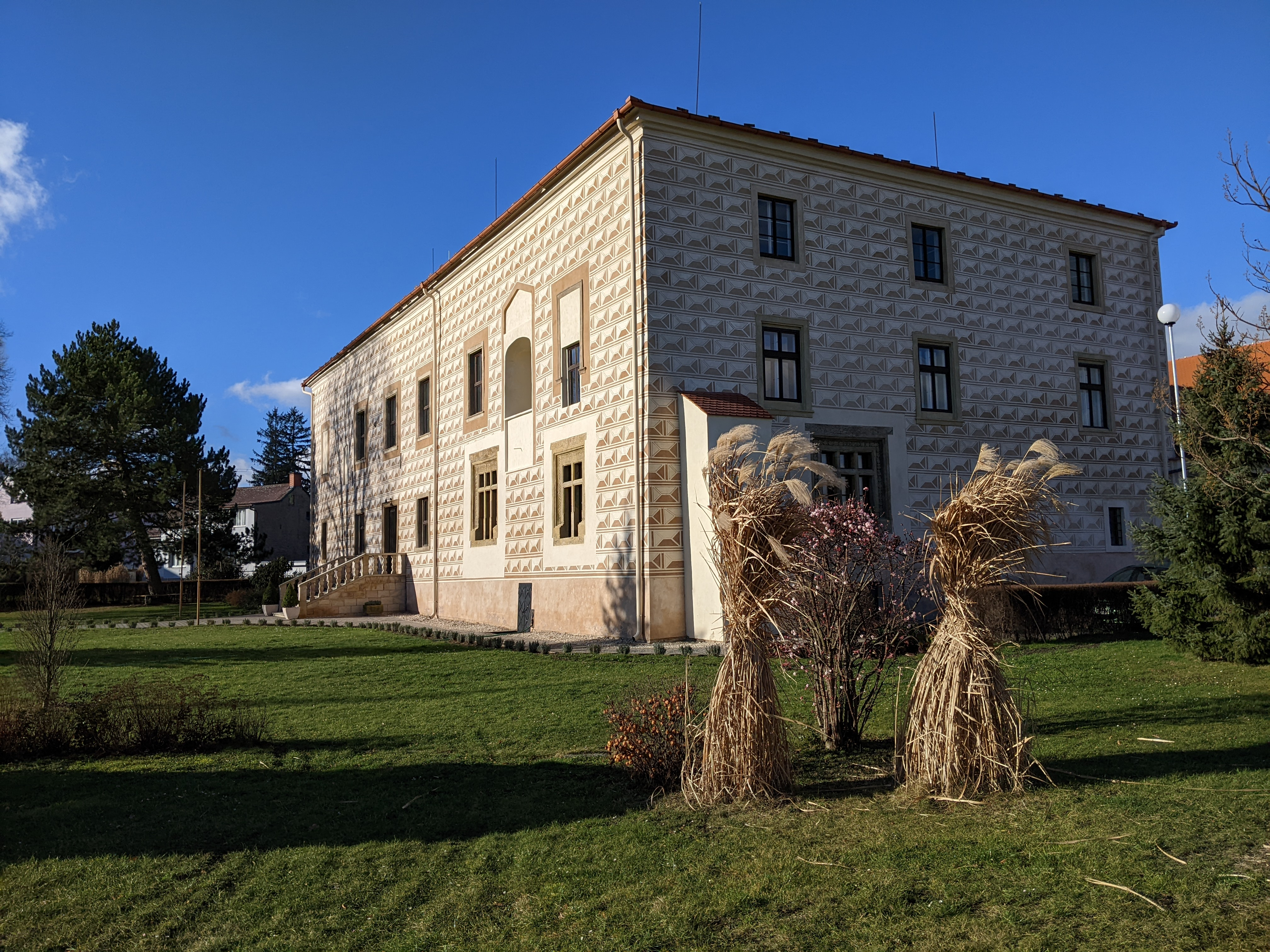
Suchdol Castle, 2023

The death of Markvart of Úlice, a key commander of the Prague forces, was a significant loss for Sigismund, although his army continued the campaign. The fortress of Suchdol, isolated after the surrender of Kutná Hora, probably surrendered to avoid total destruction, thus preserving some of its structures.

The historian August Sedláček indicates that Petr Píšek was imprisoned in the military camp by Sigismund and forced to cede another fortress, Perštejnec, to a supporter of the Hungarian king, perhaps in retaliation for his resistance.

== In popular culture ==
The siege was fictionalized in the 2025 video game Kingdom Come: Deliverance 2. In the game, the battle takes place in the year 1403. Defense of Suchdol is led by Jan Žižka and battle ends with destruction of forces loyal to Sigismund of Luxembourg.
