= Kingdom Come: Deliverance II =

2025 video game

- Developer: Warhorse Studios
- Publisher: Deep Silver
- Director: Daniel Vávra
- Producer: Vojtěch Kovařič
- Designers: Viktor Bocan; Prokop Jirsa
- Programmer: Martin Štýs
- Artist: Viktor Höschl
- Writer: Daniel Vávra
- Composers: Jan Valta; Adam Sporka
- Series: Kingdom Come
- Engine: CryEngine
- Platforms: PlayStation 5; Windows; Xbox Series X/S; Nintendo Switch 2
- Release: Windows, PS5, Xbox Series X/S; 4 February 2025; Nintendo Switch 2; 2027
- Genre: Action role-playing
- Mode: Single-player

Kingdom Come: Deliverance II is a 2025 action role-playing game developed by Warhorse Studios and published by Deep Silver. The second entry in the Kingdom Come series and the sequel to Kingdom Come: Deliverance (2018), the game was released for PlayStation 5, Windows, and Xbox Series X/S on 4 February 2025. The game received generally favorable reviews from critics and sold more than 6 million copies by June 2026. A Nintendo Switch 2 version is scheduled to release in 2027.

== Gameplay ==
In the game, which is played from a first-person perspective, players can use early forms of firearms to defeat enemies.

Kingdom Come: Deliverance II is an open-world action role-playing game in which the protagonist is controlled from a first-person perspective. The game world is twice as large as that of Kingdom Come: Deliverance; whereas the latter features a single connected world, the former encompasses two larger, freely explorable areas.

Missions and objectives are able to be managed in different ways, with NPCs and communities reacting respectively. In turn, the reactions to the player character influence his daily life and character development. The three skills Oratory, Charisma and Intimidation, that were applicable in dialogues with NPCs in the first game have been supplemented by Appearance, Coercion and Dominate. Interactions with NPCs are also a core feature of the game's crime system and its trading system. NPC dialogue differs depending on whether the player has attained a sufficient level for their chosen skill.

The player may choose between melee and ranged weapons. For ranged options, the game features bows and arrows, crossbows and early forms of firearms. For melee options, the player can choose between short swords, longswords, heavy weapons (maces, axes and hammers) and polearms, some of which can be wielded with a single hand, enabling the use of a shield. Players can choose the direction of their attacks and block opponent attacks, which allows the use of special attack combinations and counterattacks, some of which can only be unlocked through quests. Players can also use their weapons while riding a horse. However, some ranged weapons can only be used if loaded prior to mounting a horse and cannot be reloaded while mounted.

The player can navigate using a compass with location markers as well as a map which enables fast travel. Unlike the first game, where fast travelling featured ambushes by opponents, fast travelling features encounters with both friendly NPCs and opponents. The player is prompted to choose whether to interact with NPCs in fast travel encounters; for opponents this features an avoidance option which displays a percentage chance of succeeding. If the player accepts the encounter or fails to avoid it, fast travel will end and the player will be prompted to interact with NPCs, or for opponents, forced into a fight.

The game features a crime and punishment system. The player is able to pick locks and pockets using minigames in addition to committing murder, assault and poaching. NPCs may spot the protagonist committing crimes or may even deduce that the protagonist is responsible for missing inventory items, and the protagonist may be arrested or violently apprehended by guards or civilians. When apprehended, the player may flee from or fight the guard apprehending them, choose to accept a fine, caning, human branding or time in a pillory as punishment, or they may choose to use dialogue skills to be excused for their crimes. The player can store items obtained through theft or looting corpses in their inventory, which are marked with a red hand symbol.

As part of a post-release update, a hardcore mode was added. The hardcore mode does not allow for fast travel and does not show compass directions or the player's location on the map, as well as hiding health and stamina bars. Players starting a hardcore game will be prompted to choose debuffs which hinder gameplay, including diminished ability to increase skill levels.

== Synopsis ==
=== Setting ===
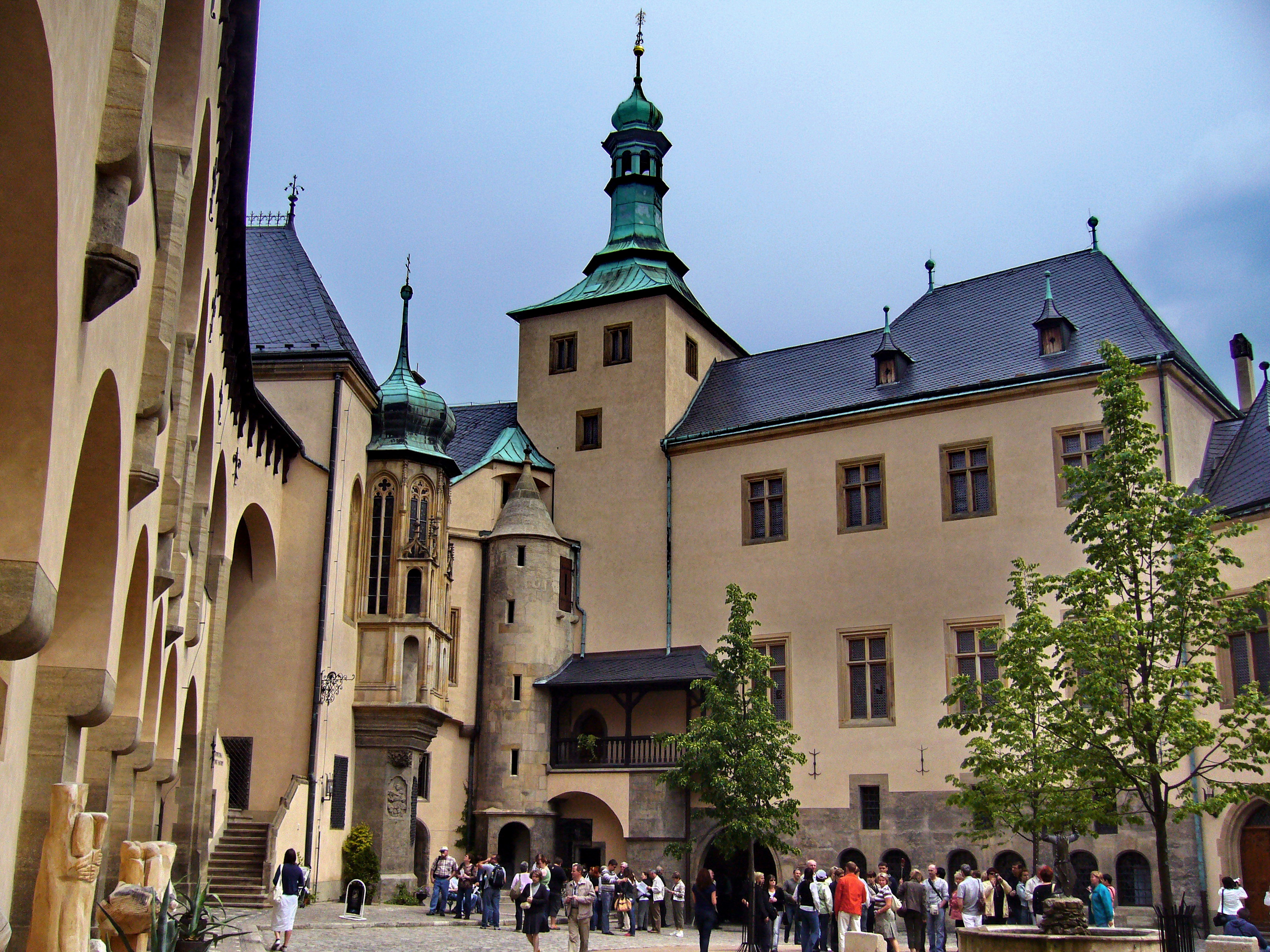
Modern day view of Kutná Hora. The game features a 15th-century recreation of the city (as Kuttenberg).

Kingdom Come: Deliverance II takes place in 1403 in the Kingdom of Bohemia, then part of the Lands of the Bohemian Crown and of the Holy Roman Empire, in what is now the Czech Republic. It features both the cultural landscape of Bohemian Paradise, and the city of Kutná Hora (Note: Kutná Hora is called by its original German name "Kuttenberg" in the game.) and its surroundings. The game reflects Kutná Hora's status in the late Middle Ages as the second-largest city in Bohemia after Prague, and one of the richest economic centers in the country due to silver mining and coinage.

Kingdom Come: Deliverance II directly follows on from the end of Kingdom Come: Deliverance, and takes place in the "turmoil of a civil war", where Wenceslaus IV fights against the invading Sigismund, King of Hungary and Croatia, and his allies. It concludes Henry's story.

=== Characters ===
Many characters featured in the game are based on real-life people from the time period. The protagonist is the fictional Henry of Skalitz (Tom McKay), a man-at-arms in service of Sir Radzig Kobyla (Michael Pitthan), his biological father. Henry leads a resistance in favor of the imprisoned King of Bohemia Wenceslaus IV, against the usurper King Sigismund of Luxembourg (George Lenz). In addition to his role as an envoy to Radzig, Henry seeks personal revenge against Sigismund and his emissaries for killing his mother and foster father. Henry is joined in his journey by the nobleman Sir Hans Capon of Pirkstein (Luke Dale). Sir Istvan Toth (Logan Hillier), the main antagonist of the first game, is also present in the sequel. Several other characters from Kingdom Come: Deliverance make appearances, including parish priest Father Godwin (Euan Macnaughton) and the lord Hanush of Leipa (Peter Hosking, Daniel Vávra).

Other historical figures characterized in the game include Jobst of Moravia, Jan Žižka, Otto von Bergow, Markvart of Úlice, John II of Liechtenstein, Hynek I Suchý Čert, Oldřich Vavák of Hradec, Petr Píšek, and Martin Oderin.

=== Plot ===
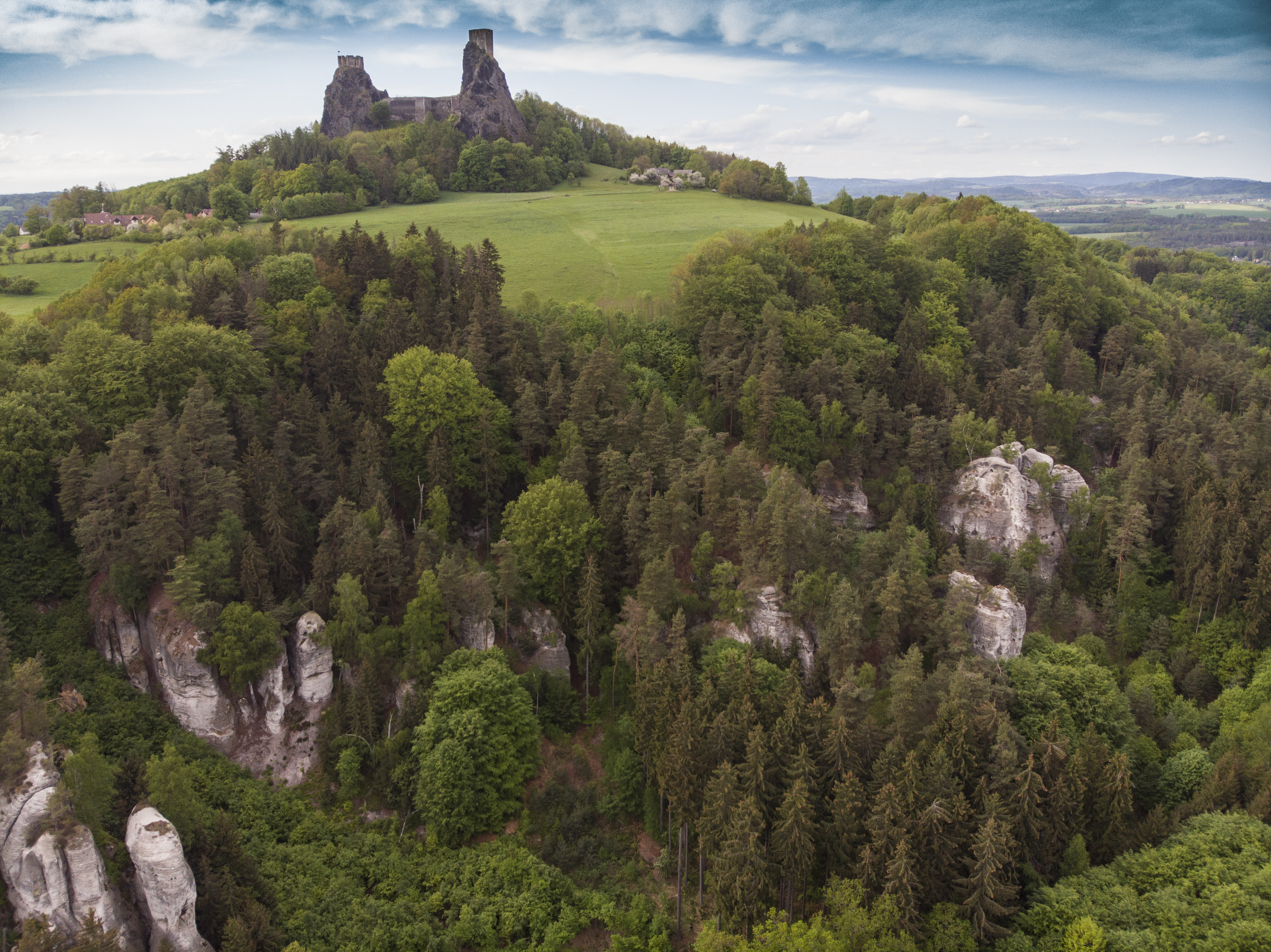
Trosky Castle is a key location in the game.

Sir Hans Capon, Henry, and an entourage travel from Rattay to Trosky Castle to question Otto von Bergow on his allegiance to King Sigismund. As the group camps, they are attacked and robbed by bandits. Henry and Capon escape and later arrive at Trosky Castle; they are denied entry when they are unable to prove their identities. At a nearby tavern, Capon starts a brawl and blames Henry for the incident; the two fall out and Capon leaves.

Henry learns that Bergow will attend a wedding in the village of Semine. Henry infiltrates the wedding but Bergow never arrives, and the groom, Olda Semine, secretly leaves. Henry meets Capon and they reconcile. A brawl breaks out, and Henry and Capon are imprisoned in Trosky Castle, with Capon sentenced to death by hanging for poaching. Bergow arrives before he can be executed, and Capon is released. He delivers the message, but Bergow fails to explain his allegiances and assigns Henry and Capon to help repress localized banditry.

The two enlist soldiers from Nebakov Fortress. A captive bandit at Trosky Castle can reveal that Olda Semine is in league with the bandits, who have covertly taken over Nebakov. If the player chooses for Henry to reveal Semine's betrayal to Bergow, he is tasked with confronting Semine; Henry can then side with Semine or let him die. In either case, Bergow musters a force to retake Nebakov, but they fail and Henry and Capon are taken prisoner. Lords Hanuš of Lipá and Radzig Kobyla, Henry's father, send Father Godwin to locate Henry and Capon. The bandit leader Jan Zizka, who is revealed to oppose Sigismund, frees them after Godwin helps suppress a rebellion by Bergow's spy, Istvan Toth.

Nebakov is assaulted by a force led by Bergow, Toth and Markvart von Aulitz. Henry, Godwin, and Zizka are imprisoned at Trosky Castle, while Capon is held for ransom. They are released by Katherine, a cook in league with Zizka. Henry discovers that Sigismund plots to kill his enemies, including John II of Liechtenstein. Henry encounters and kills Toth, recovering the sword Henry's foster-father, Martin, made for Kobyla. The group escapes through underground tunnels; Henry, Zizka, and Katherine flee to Kuttenberg, while Godwin returns to Kobyla and Hanush.

At Suchdol, Margrave Jobst warns Henry's group to refrain from banditry as he has negotiated a truce with Sigismund. Henry and Katherine find Liechtenstein in Kuttenberg's Jewish quarter, safeguarded by vigilante Samuel. Henry warns Liechtenstein about Sigismund and learns Capon is held at Bergow's Maleshov castle. Henry and Zizka recruit from an anti-Sigismund mercenary group led by "Dry Devil". They infiltrate Maleshov and rescue Capon and prisoner Vauquelin Brabant. Henry and Capon encounter Kobyla, Hanush, and Godwin travelling to a meeting of loyalist lords in Raborsch, and informed about Sigismund's presence at an upcoming Kuttenberg council meeting.

Henry infiltrates the meeting and witnesses Sigismund and Aulitz ordering a pogrom against Kuttenberg's Jews. He hurries to Raborsch, where the lords' meeting is attacked by a force led by Bergow; they are repelled but the lords are captured. At Kuttenberg, Henry helps Samuel escort the Jews from the city, learning he is the bastard son of Martin.

The group plan to capture Bergow as leverage to free the lords. Using mercenaries hired by Brabant and a stolen bombard, they storm Maleshov and capture Bergow. He believes that Sigismund's position in Bohemia is unsustainable, and suggests that robbing his silver reserves held at his Kuttenberg royal residence—which also holds the lords—would force him to leave. While some of the party masquerade as papal legate as a distraction, the rest traverse Kuttenberg's mines to access the silver and rescue the lords. They succeed, but Brabant and his mercenaries attempt to take the silver; in the ensuing scuffle, Brabant escapes.

Henry's group flees to Suchdol castle, and Sigismund and his army leave Bohemia. A force led by Aulitz, Bergow, and Brabant besiege Suchdol, and Aulitz is mortally wounded by Dry Devil. Henry leaves to bring help from Jobst, Hanush and Kobyla. He returns with reinforcements, and they repel the attackers. In the epilogue, Henry is visited by an apparition of his mother and Martin, and Kobyla offers him his sword.

The player's choices influence the game's ending. If Henry performs acts of virtue, Henry's parents express their pride and depart into the afterlife. If Henry is more ruthless, Henry's parents reproach him. Henry can also choose to become an adventurer or a soldier and accepts Kobyla's sword. Alternatively, Henry can decline the sword, and retire as a villager in Rattay or burgher in Kuttenberg, in which he settles down with one of three love interests. In a secret ending, if Henry has not pursued any love interest and stayed chaste, he retires to Rattay and reunites with his love interest, Theresa.

In post credit scenes, Dry Devil blinds Zizka in one eye while trying to shoot an apple from his head. In a flashback, Sigismund is informed about the theft of the silver, and angrily trashes his chamber before ordering the withdrawal to Hungary.

== Development and release ==
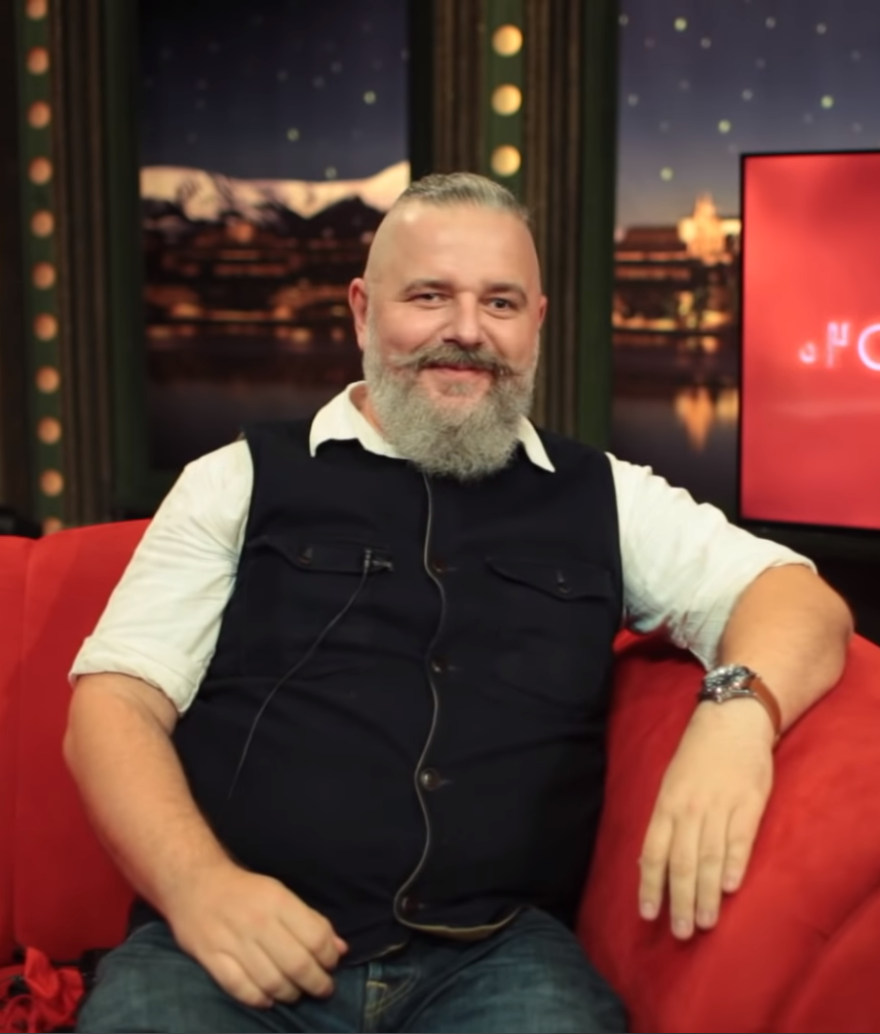
Creative director of the game, Daniel Vávra

Development on Kingdom Come: Deliverance II began in July 2019, following the release of Kingdom Come: Deliverance and its downloadable content. While Warhorse Studios had 131 employees in 2019, it had grown to around 250 people by spring 2024 at the latest. Warhorse Studios wanted Kingdom Come: Deliverance II to be the game that Kingdom Come: Deliverance was supposed to be with their improved resources and experience. The game uses a heavily-customized version of the CryEngine, with music composed by Czech composers Jan Valta and Adam Sporka. The expertise of various historians, universities and museums was again drawn on to represent a "realistic, immersive and believable medieval world". Unlike the development of Kingdom Come: Deliverance, the motion capture was supplemented by facial capture. Stunt riders also took part in the development of Kingdom Come Deliverance II. The protagonist, Henry, is again portrayed by the British actor Tom McKay. Lead developer Daniel Vávra stated that the game's script has 2.2 million words. The script of the previous record holder, Baldur's Gate 3, contains around two million words, according to Guinness World Records.

Martin Klíma, the game's executive producer and co-founder of Warhorse Studios, cited The Elder Scrolls III: Morrowind, Bethesda Game Studio's 2002 action role-playing game, as a major influence on the game's development. FromSoftware's Dark Souls series and Elden Ring were also cited as influences on the game's design, by design director Viktor Bocan.

Kingdom Come: Deliverance II was announced and revealed in April 2024 in a recorded video set in St. Barbara's Church, Kutná Hora. The game was released for PlayStation 5, Windows, and Xbox Series X/S on 4 February 2025. It was available in three retail versions: in addition to the base Standard Edition, Kingdom Come: Deliverance II is available as a Gold Edition and Collector's Edition. The Gold Edition contains three downloadable content (DLC)s planned for release at a later date, equipment for the protagonist, and bonus content called "Shields of Seasons Passing". Both the Standard Edition and the Gold Edition are available via digital download and as a physical edition. The Collector's Edition includes all the content of the Gold Edition and is supplemented by several physical items. All pre-orderers receive a bonus quest, "The Lion Crest".

In January 2025, the Saudi Arabian outlet VGA4A reported that the game would be refused classification and consequently banned in Saudi Arabia due to the game's portrayal of same-sex relationships. Vávra denied that the game had been banned in any country and clarified that such content was optional, stating, "gay characters were already in KCD1. If you want Henry to try a same-sex adventure, feel free. If you don't want to, you don't have to." Saudi Arabia had previously banned Final Fantasy XVI and The Last of Us Part II for similar reasons.

=== Post-launch content ===
On 16 January 2025, Warhorse Studios revealed a DLC roadmap. After launch, the game would receive free improvements such as a barber feature, hardcore mode and horse racing. This would be followed along by additional paid DLC content Brushes with Death, Legacy of the Forge and Mysteria Ecclesiae over the course of 2025. The paid DLC were included in an expansion pass called "Shields of Seasons Passing." On November 12, 2025, Warhorse released the Kingdom Come: Deliverance 2 – Royal Edition, which bundled the main game and all updates and DLC packs. A port of Royal Edition for Nintendo Switch 2 was announced in September 2026 on Nintendo Direct and is scheduled to release in 2027.

== Reception ==
Reception

Aggregate scores
Aggregator	Score
Metacritic	(PC) 89/100 (Note: Based on 78 reviews) (PS5) 88/100 (Note: Based on 60 reviews) (XSXS) 88/100 (Note: Based on 14 reviews)
OpenCritic	95% recommend

Review scores
Publication	Score
Destructoid	9.5/10
Eurogamer	3/5
Famitsu	31/40
Game Informer	9.5/10
GameSpot	9/10
GamesRadar+	4/5
Hardcore Gamer	4.5/5
IGN	9/10
PC Gamer (US)	90/100
PCGamesN	9/10
Push Square	10/10
Shacknews	9/10
TechRadar	5/5
Video Games Chronicle	5/5
VG247	5/5
VideoGamer.com	7/10

Kingdom Come: Deliverance II received "Generally favorable reviews" reviews from critics, according to the review aggregator website Metacritic. OpenCritic reported that 95% of critics recommended the game. Critics praised Kingdom Come: Deliverance II for its immersive open-world, role-playing game mechanics, and story.

Joshua Wolens of PC Gamer likened Kingdom Come: Deliverance II to other "system-heavy" games such as The Elder Scrolls III: Morrowind, stating that the game is a "ludicrously ambitious and peculiar thing that somehow fulfills its ambition and peculiarity." Wolens praised the game for its varied plot lines and activities, allowing the player to play as a soldier, spy, gambler or blacksmith.

Reviewers noted that the game performed to a high level of optimization on release, with few noticeable bugs or technical issues. Brendan Lowry of Windows Central stated that "what Warhorse has built here undoubtedly stands tall as one of the most visually impressive games ever developed, rich with the finest details, stunning naturalistic lighting, and what seem like impossible draw distances."

Some players vocally objected to the inclusion of expanded same sex romance options for Henry, and the inclusion of a black character. PR manager Tobias Stolz-Zwilling stated that he felt "fed up" with being caught in the culture war, emphasising that the studio's goal was to create a "rich, immersive historically accurate experience."

In Japan, four critics from Famitsu gave the game a total score of 31 out of 40.

=== Sales ===
On release day, Kingdom Come: Deliverance II topped the Steam top-sellers list and broke even financially. It reached a peak concurrent player count on Steam of 159,351 players, beating Kingdom Come: Deliverance by more than 60,000 players. The game broke its sixth concurrent Steam player record in as many days, peaking at 256,206 players. It was the 15th best-selling game of 2025 in the US. China was the second-largest market for the game, according to Stolz-Zwilling.

The game sold more than 1 million units on release day. By June 2026, Kingdom Come: Deliverance II had sold over 6 million copies worldwide.

=== Accolades ===
The game was selected by PC Gamer as their Game of the Year.

Year	Award	Category	Result	Ref.
2024	Gamescom	Best Audio	Nominated	
2024	Gamescom	Most Epic	Nominated	
2024	Gamescom	Best PC Game	Won	
2025	Golden Joystick Awards	Ultimate Game of the Year	2nd place	
2025	Golden Joystick Awards	Best Lead Performer (Tom McKay)	Nominated	
2025	Golden Joystick Awards	Best Supporting Performer (Jim High)	Nominated	
2025	Golden Joystick Awards	PC Game of the Year	Nominated	
2025	Golden Joystick Awards	Best Game Trailer	Nominated	
2025	The Game Awards 2025	Game of the Year	Nominated	
2025	The Game Awards 2025	Best Narrative	Nominated	
2025	The Game Awards 2025	Best Role Playing Game	Nominated	
2026	The Steam Awards 2025	Game of the Year	Nominated	
2026	The Steam Awards 2025	Outstanding Story-Rich Game	Nominated	
2026	Ultra Game Awards 2025	Game of the Year	Won	
2026	Ultra Game Awards 2025	Best DLC (Brushes with Death, Legacy of the Forge, and Mysteria Ecclesiae)	Nominated	
2026	Ultra Game Awards 2025	Best Role Playing Game	Won	
2026	Ultra Game Awards 2025	Best Narrative	Won	
2026	Ultra Game Awards 2025	Game of the Year (Players' Voice)	Won	
2026	29th Annual D.I.C.E. Awards	Role-Playing Game of the Year	Nominated	
2026	29th Annual D.I.C.E. Awards	Outstanding Achievement in Game Direction	Nominated	
2026	29th Annual D.I.C.E. Awards	Outstanding Achievement in Game Design	Nominated	
2026	22nd British Academy Games Awards	Artistic Achievement	Longlisted	
2026	22nd British Academy Games Awards	Narrative	Won	
2026	22nd British Academy Games Awards	Technical Achievement	Longlisted	
2026	22nd British Academy Games Awards	Performer in a Leading Role (Tom McKay)	Nominated	
2026	International Film Music Critics Association Awards 2025	Best Original Score for a Video Game or Interactive Media (J. Valta, A. Sporka)	Nominated	

== Sequel ==
In May 2026, Warhorse Studios announced that it was developing a new project in the Kingdom Come series. During interviews with Chinese media at ChinaJoy 2026, communications director Tobias Stolz-Zwilling shared that the title is expected to release in their 2027 fiscal year which runs between April 2027 and March 2028.
