= Markvart of Úlice =

Bohemian hetman (died 1402)

- Governor of Prague
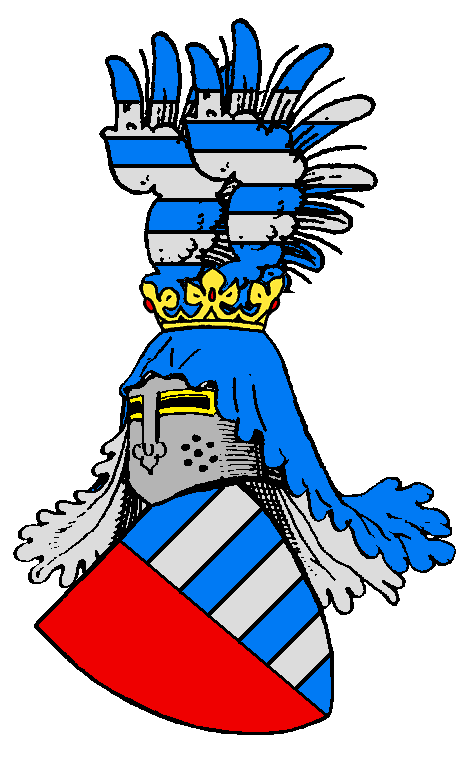
- Coat of arms
- Native name: Markvart z Úlic
- Other names: Markvart von Aulitz
- Died: 27 December 1402; Suchdol, Kingdom of Bohemia
- Noble family: Uličkové z Úlic
- Father: Jan of Úlice

Markvart of Úlice (died 27 December 1402) was a Bohemian nobleman and a hetman of Sigismund of Luxembourg. He fought during Sigismund's campaign against King Wenceslaus IV in Kutná Hora.

== Biography ==
Markvart was born to a minor noble family who owned Úlice Castle in the village of Úlice. His father was Jan of Úlice. Markvart was mentioned with his brother, Lvík, in 1377. Their family used the same coat of arms as the Czernin family.

Markvart was the governor of Prague. He was summoned by Sigismund to support the Conquest of Kutná Hora in 1402. His soldiers razed and pillaged much of the area around the town. Markvart staged the Siege of Suchdol that December. He sought to take the castle from the burgrave Petr Píšek and claim it as his own. However, Markvart was slain in battle after being struck in the throat by an arrow on December 27.

== In popular culture ==
A fictionalized Markvart is an antagonist in the 2018 video game Kingdom Come: Deliverance. Referenced in-game as Sir Markvart von Aulitz, he is depicted leading an attack on Silver Skalitz which directly influences the events of the game. He also features in the 2025 sequel Kingdom Come: Deliverance II. He meets his end during ingame siege of Suchdol, mirroring his death in reality, but instead of an arrow to his throat he is shot in the chest with a crossbow bolt, and then dies of an infection or at the main character's hands depending on the player's choices. Although it happens almost a year after his real death, in 1403.
