= Smil Flaška of Pardubice =

14th-century Bohemian nobleman

- Supreme Provincial Scribe of the Kingdom of Bohemia
- Native name: Smil Flaška z Pardubic
- Born: c. 1350
- Died: 13 August 1403 near Kutná Hora
- Noble family: Lords of Pardubice

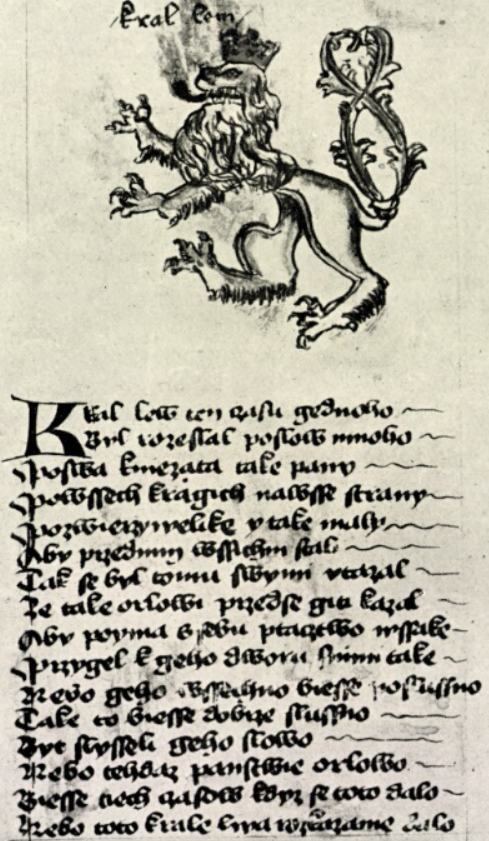
15th-century manuscript of Nová rada

Smil Flaška of Pardubice (c. 1350 - 13 August 1403) was a nobleman, writer, and Supreme Provincial Scribe of the Kingdom of Bohemia.

== Biography ==
Smil Flaška spent his youth in the house of his uncle Arnošt of Pardubice. Before 1367, he obtained a bachelor's degree at the University of Prague. In the years 1384 and 1385 he was in a dispute with King Wenceslas IV, who declared his right to Pardubice as an escheat. The provincial court upheld Wenceslas's claim. Smil Flaška since developed an anti-royal attitude.

Smil Flaška inherited the Pardubice and Rychmburk estates in 1390. On 10 January 1395, he joined the League of Lords. From 1396 he was the Supreme Provincial Scribe and from 1403 he served as the governor of the Čáslav region. He died in a battle against royalist supporters in Kutná Hora.

== In popular culture ==
Smil Flaška was mentioned in the 2018 video game Kingdom Come: Deliverance. The game features the character Novice Siskin, a fictional son of Smil Flaška. Smil Flaška's work New Council (Czech: Nová rada) can be read in game.
