= Nebákov Castle =

Former castle in the Czech Republic

- hrádek Nebákov
- Location within Czech Republic

General information
- Status: Destroyed
- Location: Mladějov-Roveň, Hradec Králové Region, Czech Republic
- Coordinates: 50°30′10″N 15°11′57″E
- Year built: Late 13th century

Nebákov Castle is a small ruined castle in the municipality of Mladějov in the Hradec Králové Region of the Czech Republic. It was built in the 13th century and became a ruin at the end of the 15th century.

== History ==
Nebákov was built in the mid-13th century on a narrow promotory overlooking the Žehrovka Stream and the fishpond Nebákov. Nebákov was first mentioned in 1455 as the property of the widow Machna of Nová Ves. The castle likely burned down by the end of the 15th century and by 1538 is said to have been fully abandoned.

== Description ==
The remains of the castle stand on a narrow promontory above the confluence of the Žehrovka Stream and a nameless stream and follow a donjon-type layout. The site is essentially divided into three parts. The front section, separated from the mainland by an isthmus ditch, formed the main core of the castle. This area was constructed in an unusual manner: the natural rock was leveled and hewn along the sides, a perimeter wall was then built to enclose the space, and the interior was subsequently filled with earth. On this artificially created platform stood a large building, probably a half-timbered residential tower with an adjoining extension founded eccentrically rather than centrally. Access was provided by a staircase cut directly into the rock. The perimeter of the tower was almost certainly fenced off due to the elevation of the surrounding terrain and ditch.

The middle section preserves the remains of two rooms, probably basements, also carved into the rock. The rear section, separated by a ditch, consists of a rocky, mound-like formation that once supported a wooden structure.

Remains of mortar and High medieval pottery were found throughout the ruins during excavations in 1925–1927 and 1973.

== In popular culture ==
Nebákov is a primary location in the game Kingdom Come: Deliverance II.
