= Kingdom Come (series) =

Video game series

Kingdom Come: Deliverance
- Series logo
- Genre: Action role-playing game
- Developer: Warhorse Studios
- Publisher: Deep Silver
- Creator: Daniel Vávra
- Platforms: Microsoft Windows, Nintendo Switch, Nintendo Switch 2, PlayStation 4, PlayStation 5, Xbox One, Xbox Series X/S
- First release: Kingdom Come: Deliverance; 13 February 2018
- Latest release: Kingdom Come: Deliverance II; 4 February 2025

Kingdom Come is a series of action role-playing games developed by Warhorse Studios. The series began with Kingdom Come: Deliverance, released in 2018, and continued with Kingdom Come: Deliverance II, released in 2025. The games are set in early 15th-century Bohemia and follow Henry, the son of a blacksmith, during a conflict involving Wenceslaus IV of Bohemia and Sigismund of Luxembourg.

The series emphasizes a historically grounded medieval setting rather than fantasy role-playing conventions. A new project in the Kingdom Come franchise was announced in May 2026 and will be released in Warhorse's 2027 fiscal year.

== Gameplay and design ==
The Kingdom Come: Deliverance games are first-person, open-world action role-playing games. The series uses a classless progression system in which the player character improves skills through actions, dialogue choices, and repeated use of abilities. The games also emphasize reputation, player choice, and non-linear quest objectives, with non-player characters responding to the player character's conduct and crimes.

Recurring systems include layered clothing and armor, equipment degradation, hunger and sleep requirements, horseback travel, lock-picking, pickpocketing, alchemy, and melee combat based on directional attacks and weapon weight. Kingdom Come: Deliverance II expanded the scale of the world and added two larger explorable regions, new dialogue skills, crossbows, early firearms, fast travel encounters, and a wider crime and punishment system.

== Setting and narrative continuity ==
The series is set in the early 15th-century Kingdom of Bohemia, then part of the Lands of the Bohemian Crown and the Holy Roman Empire. Its story is built around the conflict between Wenceslaus IV of Bohemia and Sigismund of Luxembourg, with the fictional protagonist Henry of Skalitz becoming involved in the political struggle after the destruction of his home village.

The first game is set mainly in the region around Skalitz, Rattay, Sázava, and Talmberk. Kingdom Come: Deliverance II directly continues Henry's story and expands the setting to include Bohemian Paradise and Kutná Hora, reflecting the latter city's importance as a silver-mining and coinage centre in late medieval Bohemia.

== Games ==
Title	Initial release	Platforms	Notes
Kingdom Come: Deliverance	13 February 2018	Microsoft Windows, PlayStation 4, Xbox One, Nintendo Switch, PlayStation 5, Xbox Series X/S	The first game in the series.
Kingdom Come: Deliverance II	4 February 2025	Microsoft Windows, PlayStation 5, Xbox Series X/S, Nintendo Switch 2	A direct sequel that continues Henry's story.
Kingdom Come: Salvation	TBA	TBA	Announced by Warhorse Studios and Deep Silver in May 2026 as a "new Kingdom Come adventure".

== Development ==
Kingdom Come: Deliverance originated as a historically realistic role-playing game by Warhorse Studios. The project was crowdfunded in 2014 and later continued to raise additional funds through the game's official website, with Warhorse seeking further funding for expanded production elements including voice acting. Before release, the game was described as a historical role-playing game with an unusual commitment to realism, including its combat and setting.

Warhorse considered other medieval settings during early development, including medieval England and medieval Germany, but ultimately used Bohemia because the Prague-based team had greater access to local historical knowledge and research resources.

Kingdom Come: Deliverance II was announced in April 2024 as a direct continuation of the first game. The sequel again followed Henry and Hans Capon, while expanding the scale of the world and introducing new features, including firearms. In December 2025, Warhorse co-founder and executive producer Martin Klíma said the sequel reflected a design approach influenced by older role-playing video games, such as Morrowind and Oblivion, that were less focused on broad accessibility and more willing to ask effort from players.

In May 2026, Embracer Group chief executive Phil Rogers said that Warhorse was working on another game in the Kingdom Come: Deliverance franchise, although no development timeline was specified. Warhorse and Deep Silver later described the project as "a new Kingdom Come adventure" and said further details would be announced later. In a community stream, Warhorse communications director Tobias Stolz-Zwilling said that the project was an open-world role-playing game. In July 2026, Warhorse Studios filed a trademark for Kingdom Come: Salvation with the European Union Intellectual Property Office. Warhorse's PR department confirmed in an interview with a Chinese gaming outlet in August of that year that this project will be released sometime in their fiscal 2027 year which runs between April 2027 and March 2028.

== Historical representation ==
A recurring feature of the series is its emphasis on historical authenticity rather than fantasy role-playing conventions. The games use real medieval locations, historical figures, period clothing, social systems, and grounded combat while placing a fictional protagonist within the political conflict of early 15th-century Bohemia.

The series has also received criticism and academic discussion over the limits of historical authenticity in video games. Scholars and commentators have examined the first game's portrayal of medieval Bohemia, including its representation of Cumans, Hungarians, race, gender roles, and national myth. Other scholars have treated the game as a form of historical reconstruction comparable to historical reenactment, while noting that its claim to realism is shaped by available evidence, design choices, and audience expectations.

Warhorse has acknowledged that historical accuracy is sometimes moderated for gameplay. Lead designer Prokop Jirsa said that a fully realistic crime system would have been too severe for Henry, a peasant character, and that the punishment system was therefore softened for playability.

== Reception ==
=== Critical response ===
The first Kingdom Come: Deliverance received generally favorable reviews for its PC version and mixed or average reviews for its console versions, according to Metacritic. Kingdom Come: Deliverance II received generally favorable reviews from critics according to Metacritic. The sequel was nominated for the "Game of the Year" at the Game Awards, won PC Gamer's Game of the Year award and won the award for "Narrative" at the 22nd British Academy Games Awards.

=== Sales ===
By May 2025, Kingdom Come: Deliverance II had sold three million copies, while the first game had surpassed ten million copies sold across all platforms. By February 2026, Kingdom Come: Deliverance II had surpassed five million copies sold within its first year, according to Embracer Group.

== Other media and related projects ==
A live-action adaptation of Kingdom Come: Deliverance was announced in October 2020, with Erik Barmack and Warhorse Studios attached to the project. A comic book prequel to the first game was produced by Sumerian Comics and released in 2022 as a four-issue series, later collected as a graphic novel.

In February 2026, Daniel Vávra moved into a new role focused on transmedia opportunities, including development of a Kingdom Come film. Vávra and Warhorse chief executive Martin Frývaldský were reported to be working on bringing the property to either television or film, and a draft script existed.

Frývaldský said that Warhorse had already expanded Kingdom Come beyond video games through comics, concerts, and tourism, and that film was the medium that most interested the studio for further expansion.

A board game based on the franchise and designed by Vlaada Chvátil and Tomáš Holek is set to be released in early 2027. Wargamer gave it a score of nine out of ten, calling it an excellent game.
