= Warhorse Studios =

Czech video game developer

Warhorse Studios s.r.o.
- Type: Subsidiary
- Industry: Video games
- Founded: 25 July 2011; 15 years ago
- Founders: Daniel Vávra; Martin Klíma
- Headquarters: Prague, Czech Republic
- Key people: Martin Frývaldský (CEO); Martin Klíma (executive producer)
- Products: Kingdom Come series
- Operating income: 28,496,000 Czech koruna (2023)
- Net income: 28,233,000 Czech koruna (2023)
- Total assets: 700,034,000 Czech koruna (2023)
- Number of employees: 250 (2024)
- Parent: Fellowship Entertainment
- Website: warhorsestudios.cz

Warhorse Studios s.r.o. is a Czech video game developer based in Prague. Founded in July 2011 by Dan Vávra and Martin Klíma, the studio is best known for developing the Kingdom Come series, which began with Kingdom Come: Deliverance in February 2018 and continued with Kingdom Come: Deliverance II in February 2025. In February 2019, the company was acquired by Plaion.

== History ==
Warhorse Studios’ foundation was announced on 25 July 2011 by Dan Vávra, formerly a writer and game designer for 2K Czech, and Martin Klíma, formerly a producer for Bohemia Interactive. Early hires were Viktor Bocan and Zbyněk Trávnický.

The studio's first project was role-playing video game Kingdom Come: Deliverance, which was released on 13 February 2018. By February 2024, the game had sold six million units.

On 13 February 2019, the studio was acquired by Koch Media (renamed Plaion in 2022) for €42.8 million. As of August 2019, Warhorse had 131 employees.

On 10 June 2021, it was announced that Warhorse Studios would be collaborating with Saber Interactive to develop a Kingdom Come: Deliverance port for the Nintendo Switch. Kingdom Come: Deliverance Royal Edition, which includes the game's five DLCs, was released in March 2024.

In April 2024, Warhorse Studios announced Kingdom Come: Deliverance II. By this time, the company employed about 250 people. The game was released in February 2025, and sold one million units in a single day. On 12th November, Warhorse announced a sales milestone of 4 million units sold.

In early 2026, studio founder Vávra withdrew from day-to-day business at Warhorse Studios to devote himself to making a Kingdom Come film adaptation. Vávra handed over management of day-to-day business to Prokop Jirsa and Viktor Bocan. In May 2026, Warhorse Studios announced that it was working on two open-world role-playing games simultaneously; one of these is another "Kingdom Come adventure", with Prokop Jirsa serving as Creative Director. The other announced open-world RPG is set in Middle-earth — in the world of The Lord of the Rings — and is being developed under the leadership of Viktor Bocan.

== Games developed ==
| Year | Title | Platform(s) | Publisher(s) |
|---|---|---|---|
| 2018 | Kingdom Come: Deliverance | Microsoft Windows, PlayStation 4, Xbox One, Amazon Luna, Nintendo Switch, PlayStation 5, Xbox Series X/S | Warhorse Studios, Deep Silver |
| 2025 | Kingdom Come: Deliverance II | Microsoft Windows, PlayStation 5, Xbox Series X/S, Nintendo Switch 2 | Deep Silver |
| TBA | Untitled Kingdom Come game | TBA | TBA |
| TBA | Untitled Middle-Earth game | TBA | TBA |
