= Nebovidy (Kolín District) =

- Municipality
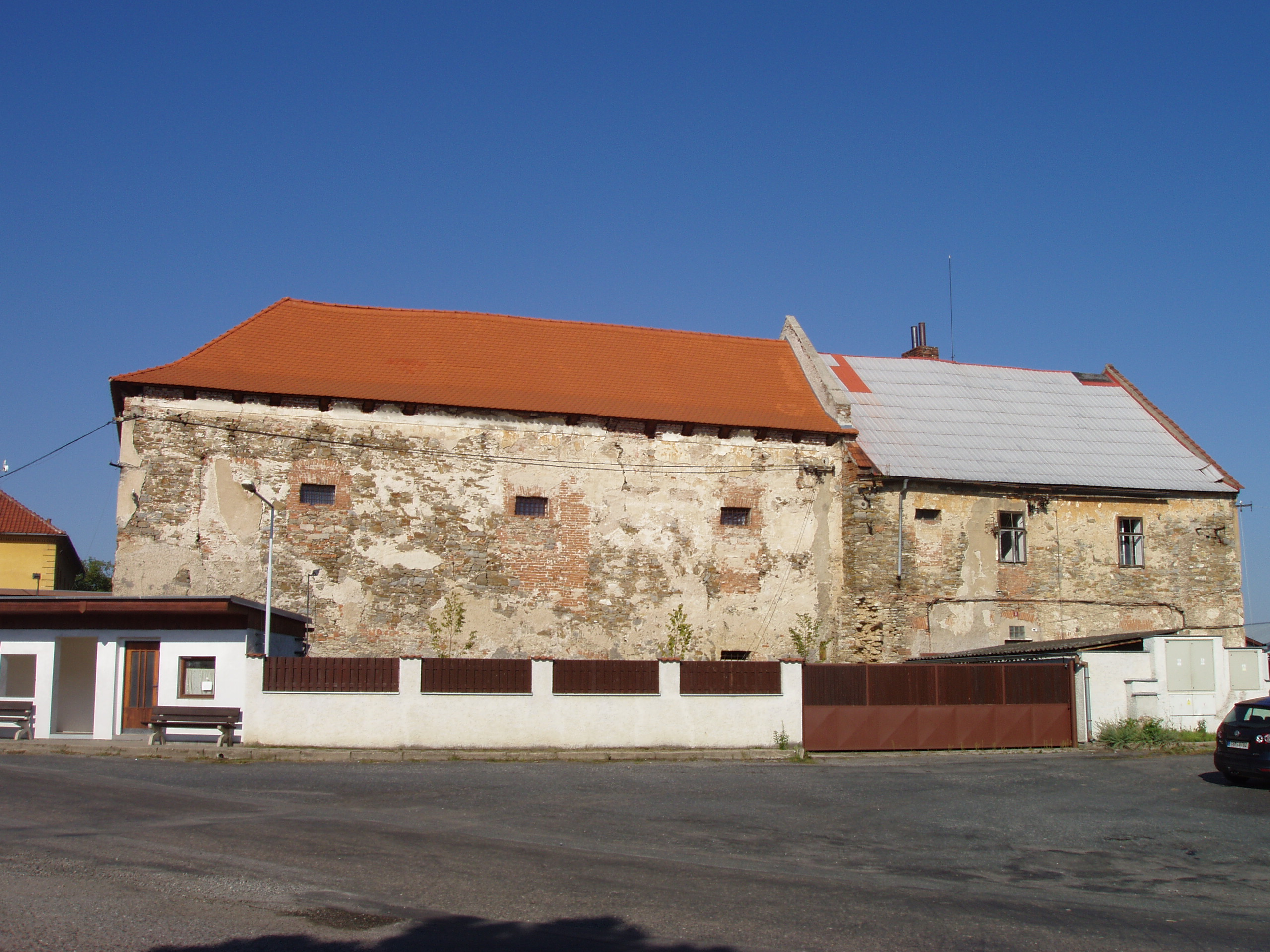
- Nebovidy Fortress

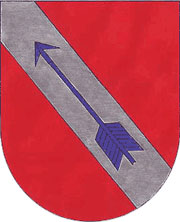
- Flag Coat of arms

- Location in the Czech Republic
- Coordinates: 49°59′30″N 15°13′10″E
- Country: Czech Republic
- Region: Central Bohemian
- District: Kolín
- First mentioned: 1268

Area
  - Total: 4.76 km^{2} (1.84 sq mi)
- Elevation: 247 m (810 ft)

Population (2026-01-01)
  - Total: 776
  - Density: 163/km^{2} (422/sq mi)
- Time zone: UTC+1 (CET)
  - Summer (DST): UTC+2 (CEST)
- Postal code: 280 02
- Website: www.nebovidy.eu

Nebovidy is a municipality and village in Kolín District in the Central Bohemian Region of the Czech Republic. It has about 800 inhabitants.

== Administrative division ==
Nebovidy consists of two municipal parts (in brackets population according to the 2021 census):

- Nebovidy (378)
- Hluboký Důl (354)

== Demographics ==
Historical population
Year	Pop.	±%
1869	647	—
1880	736	+13.8%
1890	819	+11.3%
1900	851	+3.9%
1910	781	−8.2%
1921	808	+3.5%
1930	971	+20.2%
1950	850	−12.5%
1961	712	−16.2%
1970	614	−13.8%
1980	533	−13.2%
1991	449	−15.8%
2001	479	+6.7%
2011	647	+35.1%
2021	732	+13.1%
Source: Censuses
