= Martin Oderin =

Bohemian nobleman (fl. 1393–1403)

- Lord of Ratboř
- Other names: Martin Odreyn; Martin Odrein; Martin Oderin z Hory

Martin Oderin (fl. 1393–1403) was a minor Bohemian nobleman and landowner. He owned the castle and lands of Ratboř from 1393 until it was sacked in 1402. He was influential within the Catholic community of Kutná Hora at the turn of the 14th century.

== Biography ==
Martin Oderin was the son of Markéta Oderin and Mikuláš Kreuczburger, and he likely inherited the name Oderin from his mother. He had a daughter, Anna. His family was politically important in Kutná Hora, noted as being among the oldest families to hold influence within the city.

Oderin was a patron and donor to the Catholic Church. He helped establish a chapel within St. Barbara's Church in Kutná Hora. His annual donation to the chapel was controversial, as it was claimed he already pledged the money to the Church of Saint James. He, along with his uncle Franz Oderin, held the right of patronage and appointed priests in 1399 and 1402.

In 1389, Ratboř came under ownership of King Wenceslaus IV. It was granted to Oderin in 1393. He held the lands when Sigismund of Luxembourg attacked during his 1402 conquest of Kutná Hora. The village was thoroughly destroyed during the ensuing Battle of Ratboř, and Oderin lost ownership of the lands. He survived, as his church activities were again noted in 1403.

== In popular culture ==
Martin Oderin is the basis of a character in the 2025 video game Kingdom Come: Deliverance II. He was voiced by Václav Knop.
