= Daniel Vávra =

Czech video game entrepreneur (born 1975)

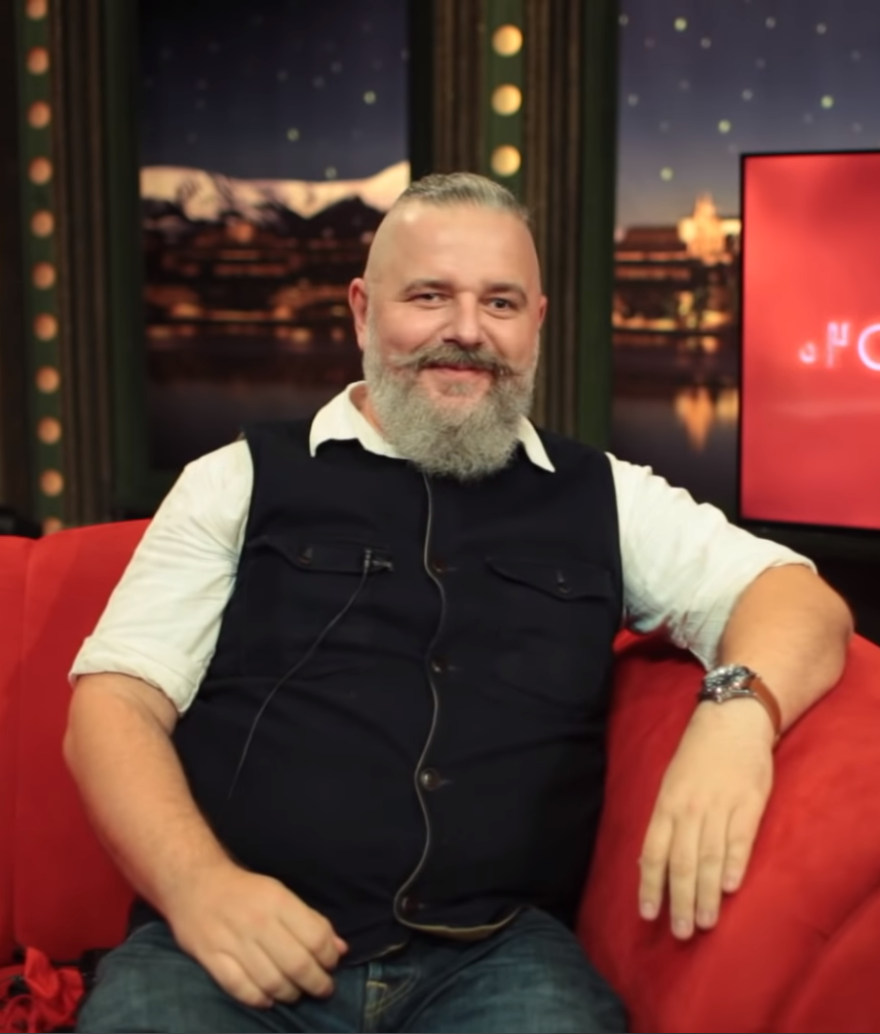
- Vávra in 2020
- Born: 2 September 1975 (age 50); Rychnov nad Kněžnou, Czechoslovakia
- Occupations: Video game writer; game director; game designer

Daniel Vávra (born 2 September 1975) is a Czech video game writer, director, designer and co-founder of Warhorse Studios. He is best known as the lead writer of the video games Mafia (2002), Mafia II (2010), Kingdom Come: Deliverance (2018) and Kingdom Come: Deliverance II (2025).

Vávra started his career in 1998 at Illusion Softworks, initially working as a graphic artist for Hidden & Dangerous, he went on to become the lead writer of Mafia. After several projects in the mid-2000s, the studio was purchased by 2K Games in 2008 and renamed 2K Czech. The studio was working on Mafia II prior to the acquirement. Vávra greatly struggled with the restructured studio under 2K Games, and left in early 2009, prior to the game's release.

Following his departure, Vávra co-founded Warhorse Studios alongside Martin Klíma in 2011, which would eventually release Kingdom Come: Deliverance in 2018, a medieval role-playing game with Vávra as the lead writer. Vávra has remained the creative director of Warhorse Studios after it was sold to Koch Media in 2019.

== Biography ==
Daniel Vávra was born in Rychnov nad Kněžnou, before moving to Prague. He has partial Jewish ancestry. Since childhood, Vávra has enjoyed working with computers, drawing comics, and taking photos. He studied at the School of Applied Arts in Turnov and started his career as a graphic designer at advertising company TIPA. He has written numerous articles for the Czech gaming magazine Level and other gaming magazines, and is also a passionate player of paintball. He was also an active demoscener, under the pseudonym Hellboy, as part of the group Broncs.

=== Illusion Softworks ===
In 1998, Vávra joined Illusion Softworks as a 2D artist. His first project was Hidden and Dangerous, for which he created some textures. His next project was the highly acclaimed Mafia: The City of Lost Heaven, for which he was the lead designer, screenwriter and director. He later became the leading figure of Illusion Softworks's Prague subsidiary, and also worked on Wings of War, released in 2004. Around 2005, he worked on another project, a third-person shooter game Hi-Tech, but it was cancelled.

==== 2K Games ownership and departure ====
In 2008, it was announced that 2K Games had acquired Illusion Softworks, and had renamed the studio to 2K Czech. Vavra wrote, and the studio were working, on Mafia II prior to the ownership, and it would release in 2010. Whilst Vavra said nothing at the time, he would later claim he struggled greatly to work under the reformed studio, mainly citing the differences in the structuring systems of major studios compared to the former smaller structure that was used by Illusion Softworks. Vavra has since gone on to state his concerns that major publishers, and the way they are structured, mainly the collective decision making, causes great damage to the gaming industry. He had also presented a full script for a future Mafia III, which was rejected by the higher-ups.

Vavra departed the studio in 2009, with the rejection of his Mafia III script from higher-ups pushing him to leave, alongside mission cuts made to Mafia II. Following his departure, the ending of Mafia II was changed from what was on Vavra's original script. He has stated he does not know why this change was made, and that the change in the story does not make any sense to him. Several other original workers at the studio departed either during, or not long after, Mafia II's release.

=== Warhorse Studios ===
In 2011, Vávra co-founded Warhorse Studios, and wrote Kingdom Come: Deliverance, a role-playing video game that uses Cry Engine 3 set in a medieval-themed open world environment. The game was set to be delivered in 2015 through episodic iterations, and was successfully funded via Kickstarter. Repeatedly delayed, the game was eventually released in 2018, with more promised content released since then. Warhorse Studios was sold to Koch Media (renamed Plaion in 2022) in 2019 for €33.2m, with Vávra remaining as its creative director.

In February 2026, Vávra stepped down as creative director at Warhorse Studios as part of organisational changes and moved into a new role focused on transmedia projects, including development of a live-action Kingdom Come: Deliverance adaptation. He remained associated with the studio while future game development leadership transitioned to other creative directors.

== Political views ==
During the development of Kingdom Come: Deliverance Vávra was described as a supporter of Gamergate, with Vávra being critical of what they saw as a progressive bias in video game journalism that falsely portrayed developers as holding discriminatory views due to perceived issues with their games in an attempt to pressure developers into changing it and comparing such criticism to censorship experienced during his upbringing under communist rule. Contrastingly in 2025, Vávra refuted claims of falling pre-orders for Kingdom Come: Deliverance II stemming from anti-diversity backlash after it was revealed that the game would feature an African character and a same-sex romance. Vávra criticized the claims as the work of grifters and defended the content of the game, saying, "Everything displayed corresponds to the morals and social norms of 1403 Bohemia and is only there to make an interesting story, and not at all to appeal to a 'modern audience'."

In 2012, Vávra led a protest against the arrest of Ivan Buchta and Martin Pezlar, developers from Bohemia Interactive, during their holiday on the Greek island of Lemnos. The two were arrested on charges of espionage, which they denied. The protest was held outside the Greek embassy in Prague.

== Video games ==
- Hidden & Dangerous (1999), Illusion Softworks
- Mafia: The City of Lost Heaven (2002), Illusion Softworks - writer and director, Czech voice talent casting
- Mafia II (2010), 2K Czech - game designer, writer, graphic designer
- Kingdom Come: Deliverance (2018), Warhorse Studios - director, lead writer, voice director
- Kingdom Come: Deliverance II (2025), Warhorse Studios - director, lead writer

== Filmography ==
=== Film ===
- Medieval (2021) - Villager

=== Video games ===
- Kingdom Come: Deliverance (2018) - Sir Hanush of Leipa
- Kingdom Come: Deliverance II (2025) - Sir Hanush of Leipa
