= Oldřich IV Vavák z Hradce =

Czech nobleman and mintmaster (died 1421)

Oldřich Vavák z Hradce
- Supreme Mintmaster of the Kingdom of Bohemia
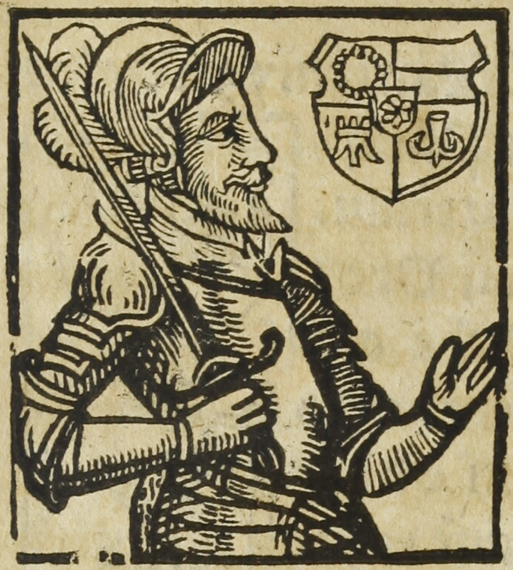
- Oldřich Vavák (Bartosz Paprocki, Zrcadlo slavného Markrabství moravského, 1593)

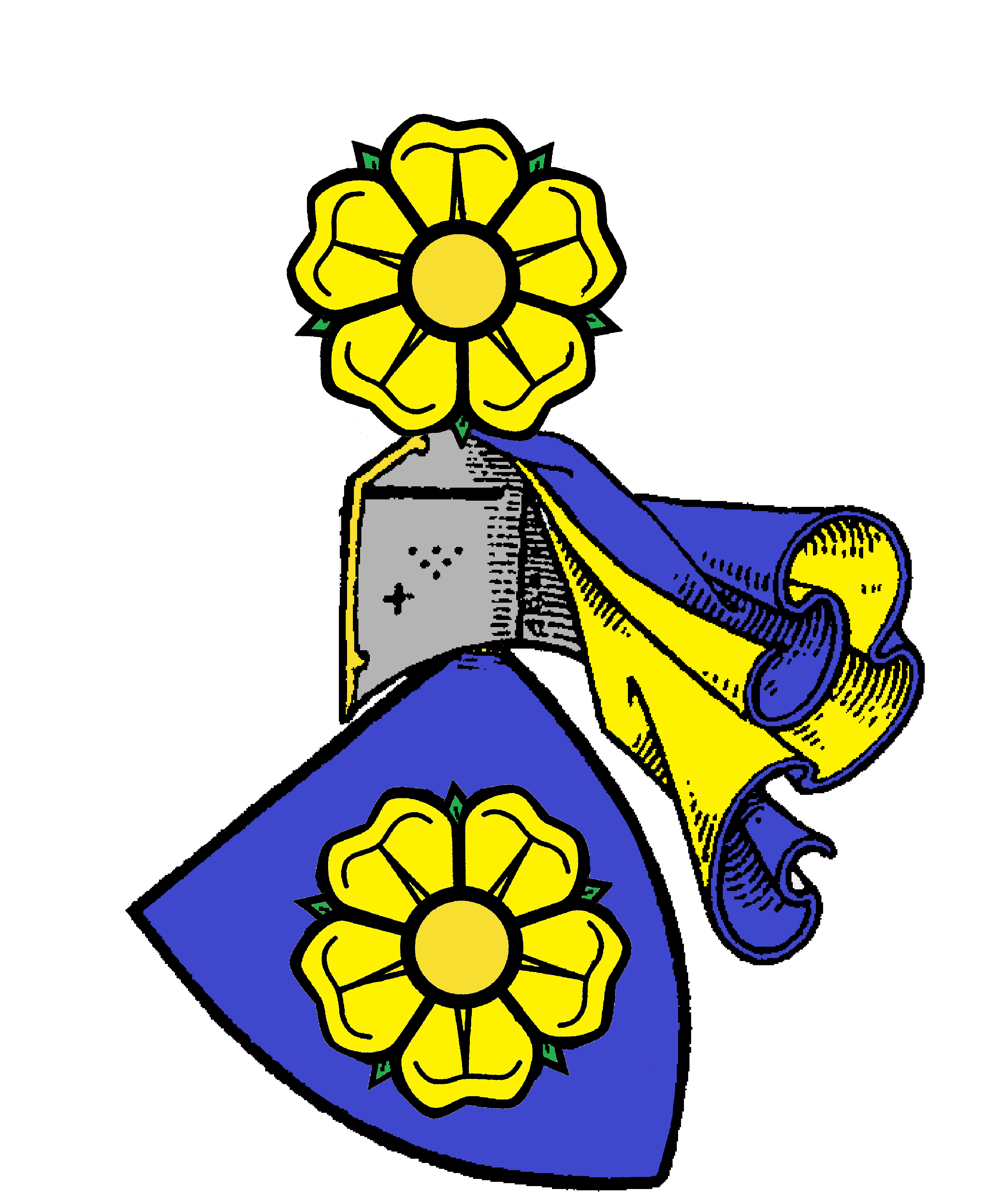
- Coat of arms
- Native name: Oldřich IV. Vavák z Hradce
- Other names: Ulrich Vavák of Hradec; Ulrich of Neuhaus
- Born: c. 1375
- Died: 22 September 1421
- Noble family: Hradec family
- Wife: Markéta of Kravaře
- Father: Jindřich III of Hradec

Oldřich Vavák z Hradce (c. 1375 – 22 September 1421) was a Czech nobleman and one of the few representatives of the higher nobility who joined the Hussites from the onset of the Hussite Wars. He fought alongside Jan Žižka.

== Biography ==
Oldřich was born to the prominent Hradec family of South Bohemia. He studied abroad at the University of Heidelberg in 1390, and inherited several estates from his father.

While his brother Jan III of Hradec was a devout Christian, Oldřich supported the teachings of Jan Hus. He affixed his seal to a letter condemning the execution of Hus in 1415. In 1420, he campaigned with Žižka and contributed to the capture of Lomnice, which had been entrusted to Oldřich's brother Jan. Oldřich also sought to take the family seat of Jindřichův Hradec from his brother.

Oldřich was against the more radical factions in the Hussite movement, and he frequently collaborated with the Utraquist commander Čeněk of Wartenberg. In 1421, he imprisoned the Taborite preacher Martin Húska. Along with Žižka, he also campaigned against the Neo-Adamites who settled near the Lužnice River. The group was subsequently burned at the stake.

Oldřich was appointed Supreme Mintmaster in 1421, but died shortly after from the plague on September 22 of that year.

== Family ==
Oldřich is the son of Jindřich III of Hradec. He is distinguished from his relatives Oldřich IV of Hradec and Oldřich V of Hradec.

Oldřich is also known as Oldřich the Younger (mladší) Vavák of Hradec, as he is differentiated from another Oldřich Vavák of Hradec, son of Oldrich IV. The elder Oldřich Vavák also served as Supreme Mintmaster in 1403, but died in 1412.

== In popular culture ==
Oldřich is the basis of a character in the 2025 video game Kingdom Come: Deliverance II. He was voiced by Zdeněk Vencl in the Czech version of the game.
