= Petr Píšek =

Bohemian nobleman (fl. 1371–1405)

Peter of Písek
- Lord of Suchdol; Lord of Perštejnec
- Other names: Petr z Písku; Petrus de Pieska

Petr of Písek (fl. 1371–1405) was a nobleman in the Kingdom of Bohemia at the turn of the 14th century. He was a loyal to King Wenceslaus IV, and was an important administrator in the city of Kutná Hora. A wealthy landowner, he served as lord of Suchdol and Perštejnec.

== Biography ==
Petr was from a wealthy family. He owned several estates in the vicinity of Kutná Hora, and was known for his generous donations to local churches. Petr was mentioned as patron of Vysoká with other members of the Písek family beginning in 1371. His patronage was disputed by other local landowners with whom he feuded.

From 1391 to 1399, Petr served as Mintmaster of Kutná Hora.^{:99} In 1394, Petr was noted as administering Suchdol, likely with his brother Vácslav and other relatives. He held the castle until it was transferred to Hanuš of Písek in 1405.

In 1402, Suchdol Castle was first explicitly mentioned in the historical records, with Petr stated to be the burgrave of the fortress. That December, he defended the castle against the forces of Sigismund during the Siege of Suchdol. Petr was captured and imprisoned by Sigismund. He had his holding at Perštejnec confiscated and lost his title as Mintmaster. His status was later reinstated by Wenceslaus after he was released in 1404. Suchdol remained in the possession of the Písek family until the onset of the Hussite Wars.

In 1405, Petr founded a chapel in Kutná Hora that was known as the Písek Chapel. It eventually came under the ownership of Pavel of Písek, a nephew of Petr.^{:91}

== In popular culture ==
Petr of Písek is depicted in the 2025 video game Kingdom Come: Deliverance II, where he was portrayed by Petr Nárožný.
