= Mikeš Divůček z Jemniště =

15th-century Czech nobleman

- Mikeš Divůček z Jemniště
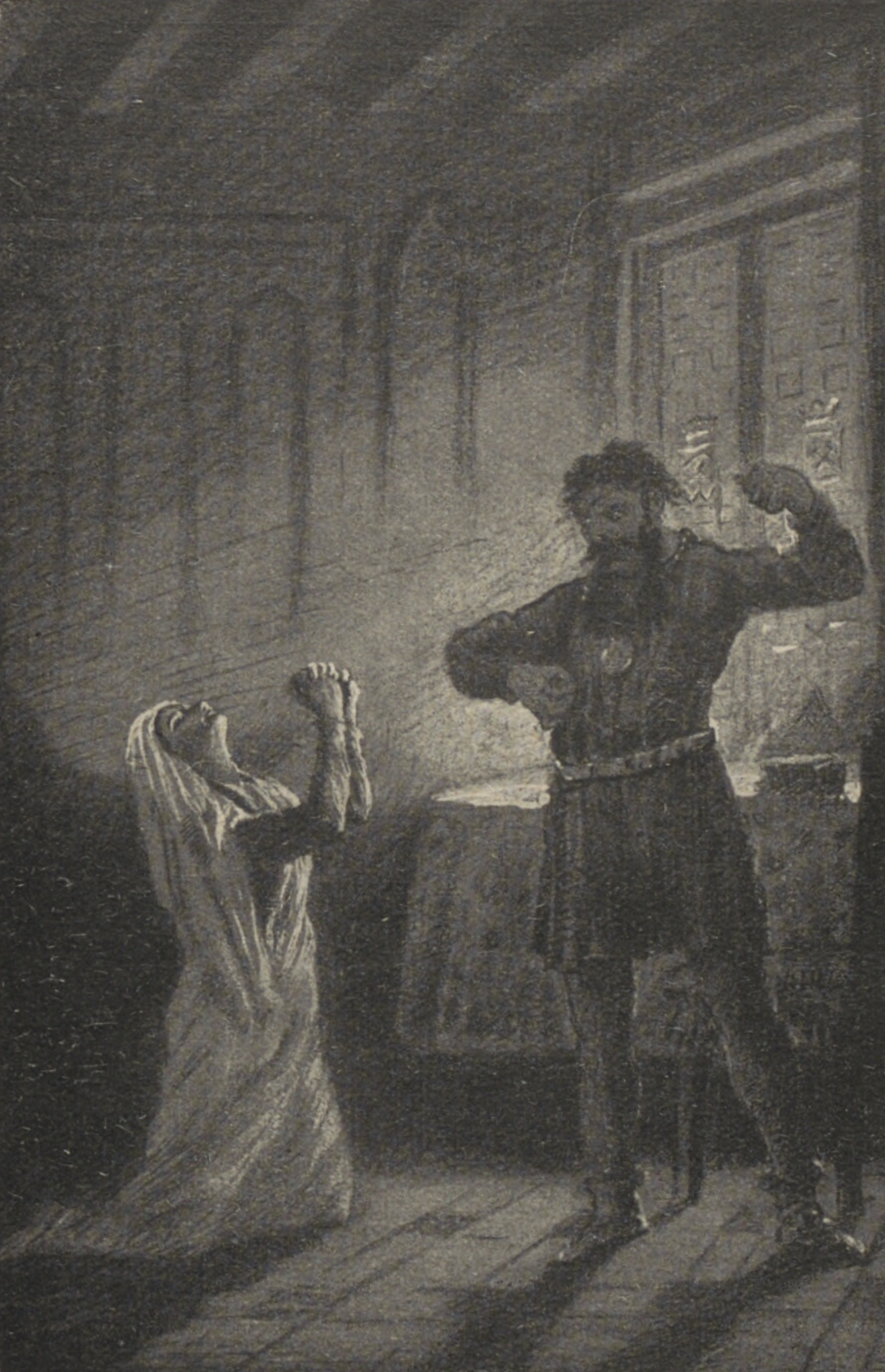
- Mikeš Divůček of Jemniště in an illustration from the book Kutnohorský kat by Josef Braun (1928 edition)
- Died: 1423
- Family: Lords of Cimburk

Mikeš (Mikuláš) Divůček of Jemniště (Czech: Mikeš Divůček z Jemniště; died 1423), was a Czech nobleman who served in the Kingdom of Bohemia as Supreme Mintmaster and lord of the Old Castle of Jemniště. He was a close associate of Jan Hus.

== Biography ==
Mikeš served under Sigismund of Luxembourg. From January to February 1413, he worked as an agent in the northern Italian cities of Belluno and Feltre. He was appointed Supreme Mintmaster from 1420 to 1421.

He was a good friend of Jan Hus, and warned him not to go to Constance. Later, however, he fought against the Hussites, for example in the Battle of Sudoměř, the Battle of Mladé Vožice, and the Battle of Vyšehrad. After these battles, he fell out of favor with King Sigismund and died in 1423, probably in Moravia.
