= Ratboř =

- Municipality
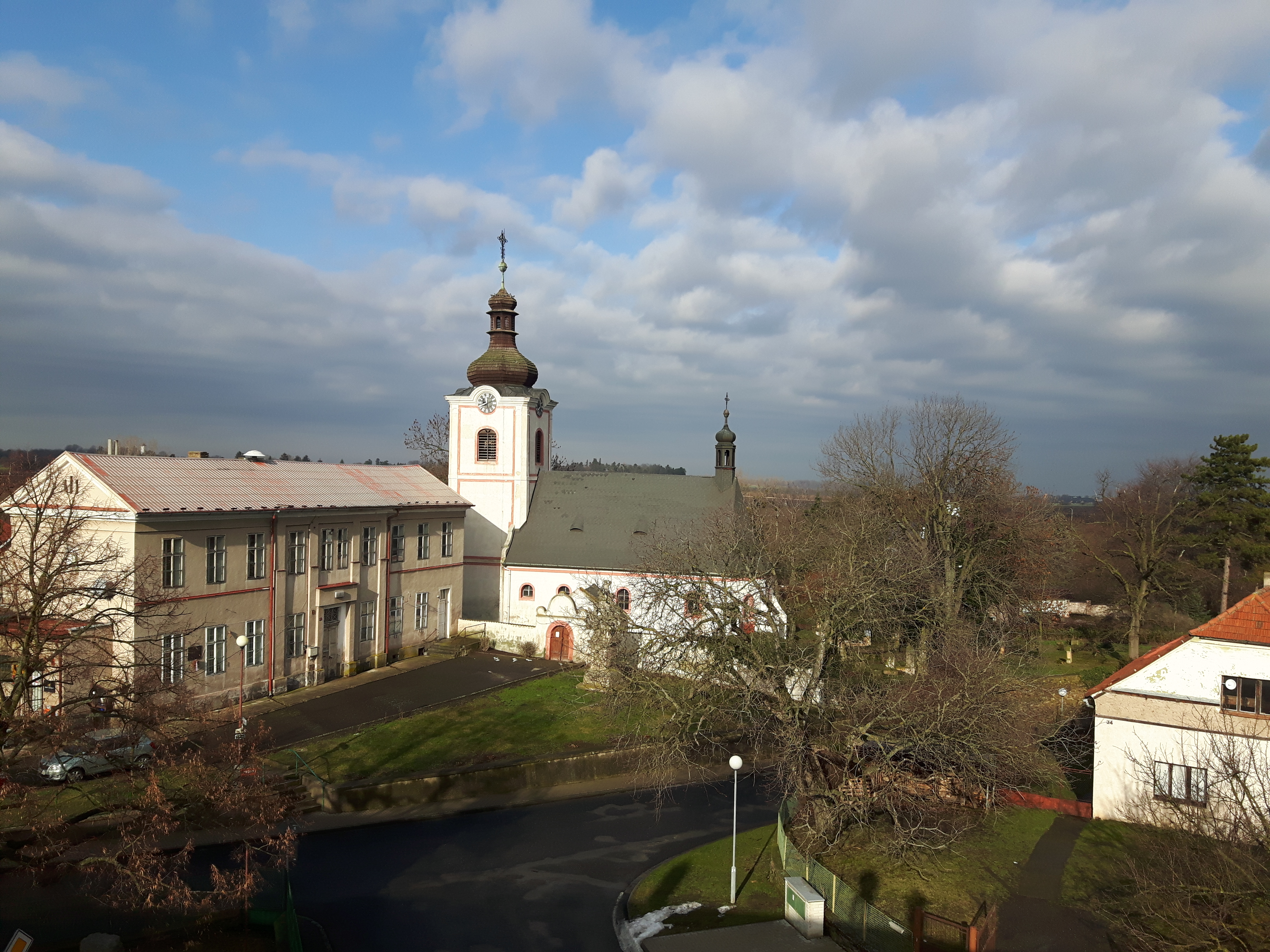
- Church of Saint Wenceslaus

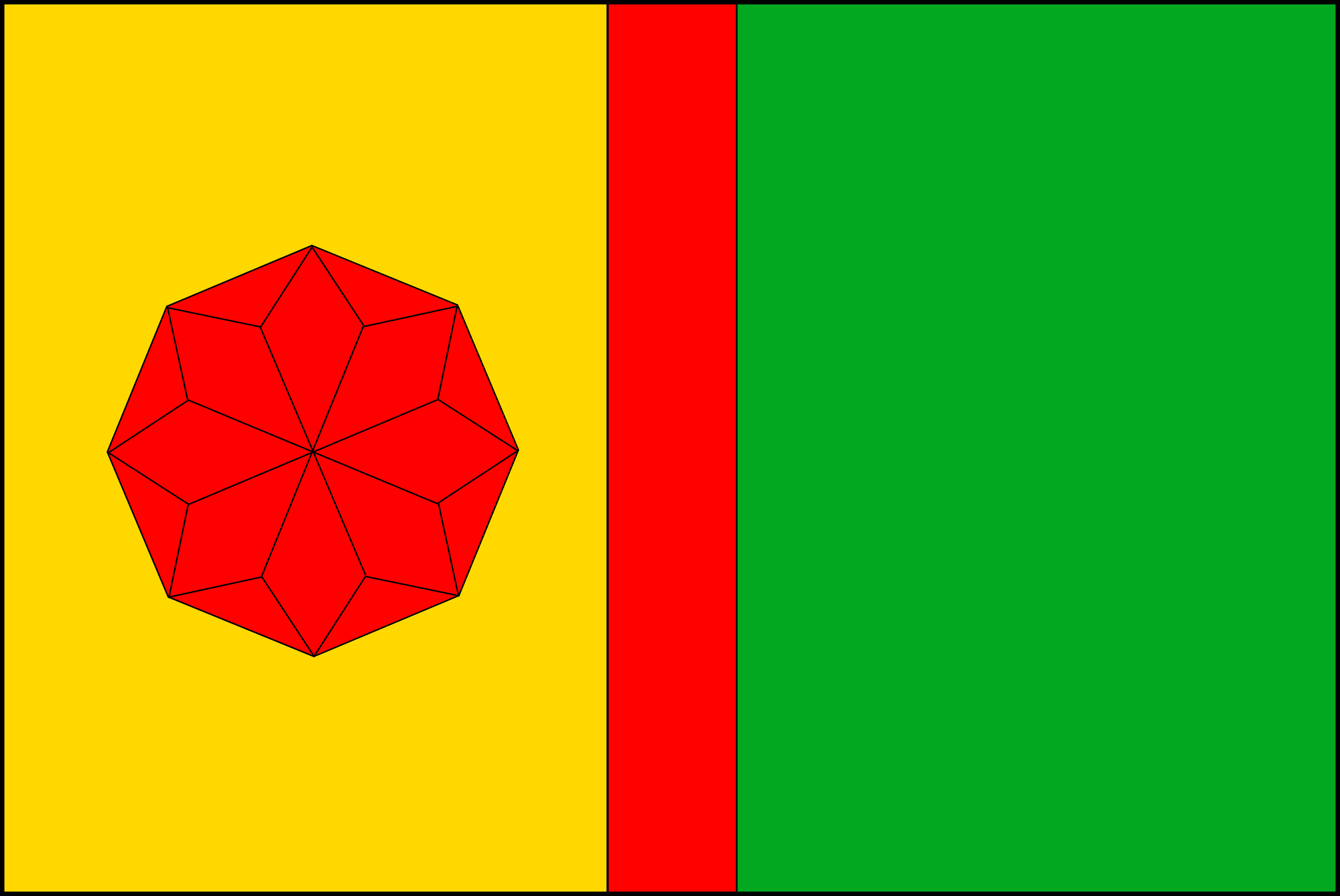
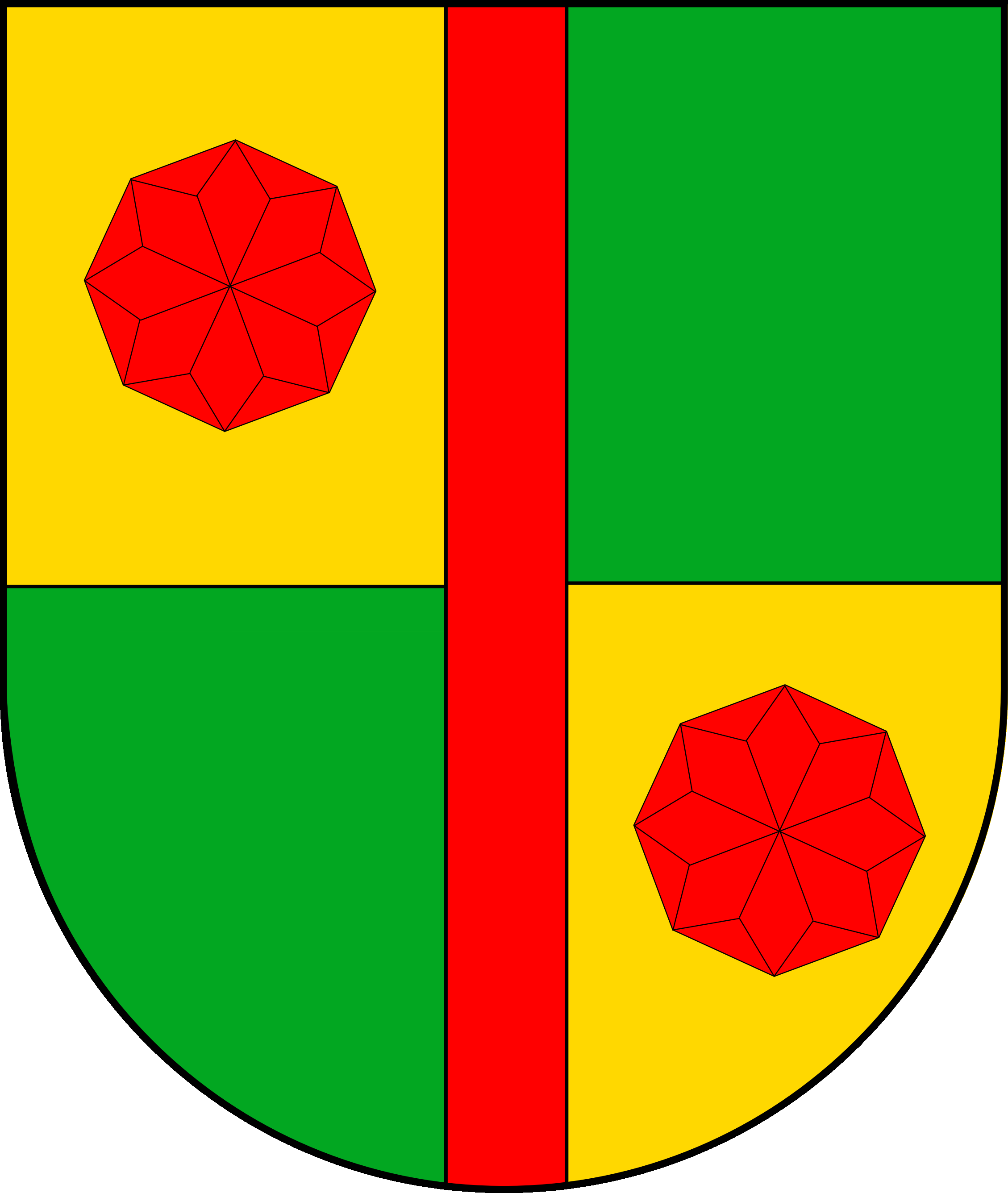
- Flag Coat of arms

- Location in the Czech Republic
- Coordinates: 49°58′41″N 15°9′33″E
- Country: Czech Republic
- Region: Central Bohemian
- District: Kolín
- First mentioned: 1352

Area
  - Total: 4.77 km^{2} (1.84 sq mi)
- Elevation: 314 m (1,030 ft)

Population (2026-01-01)
  - Total: 571
  - Density: 120/km^{2} (310/sq mi)
- Time zone: UTC+1 (CET)
  - Summer (DST): UTC+2 (CEST)
- Postal codes: 280 02, 281 41
- Website: www.ratbor.cz

Ratboř is a municipality and village in Kolín District in the Central Bohemian Region of the Czech Republic. It has about 600 inhabitants.

== Administrative division ==
Ratboř consists of three municipal parts (in brackets population according to the 2021 census):

- Ratboř (474)
- Sedlov (56)
- Těšínky (31)

== Etymology ==
The name Ratboř is derived from the personal name Ratbor or Ratibor.

== Geography ==
Ratboř is located about 6 kilometres (4 mi) southwest of Kolín and 45 km (28 mi) east of Prague. It lies in the Upper Sázava Hills. The highest point is at 375 m (1,230 ft) above sea level. The Polepka Stream, together with its nameless tributary, flows through the municipality and supplies several fishponds there.

== History ==
The first written mention of Ratboř is from 1352, but there is also an uncertain mention from 1115.

Martin Oderin was lord of Ratboř when it was attacked by Emperor Sigismund during his 1402 conquest of Kutná Hora. The village was thoroughly destroyed during the ensuing Battle of Ratboř.

== Demographics ==
Historical population

Year	Pop.	±%
1869	626	—
1880	644	+2.9%
1890	700	+8.7%
1900	751	+7.3%
1910	744	−0.9%

Year	Pop.	±%
1921	814	+9.4%
1930	867	+6.5%
1950	672	−22.5%
1961	703	+4.6%
1970	660	−6.1%

Year	Pop.	±%
1980	640	−3.0%
1991	575	−10.2%
2001	530	−7.8%
2011	522	−1.5%
2021	561	+7.5%

Source: Censuses

== Transport ==
The I/2 road (the section from Prague to Kutná Hora) runs along the southern municipal border.

== Sights ==
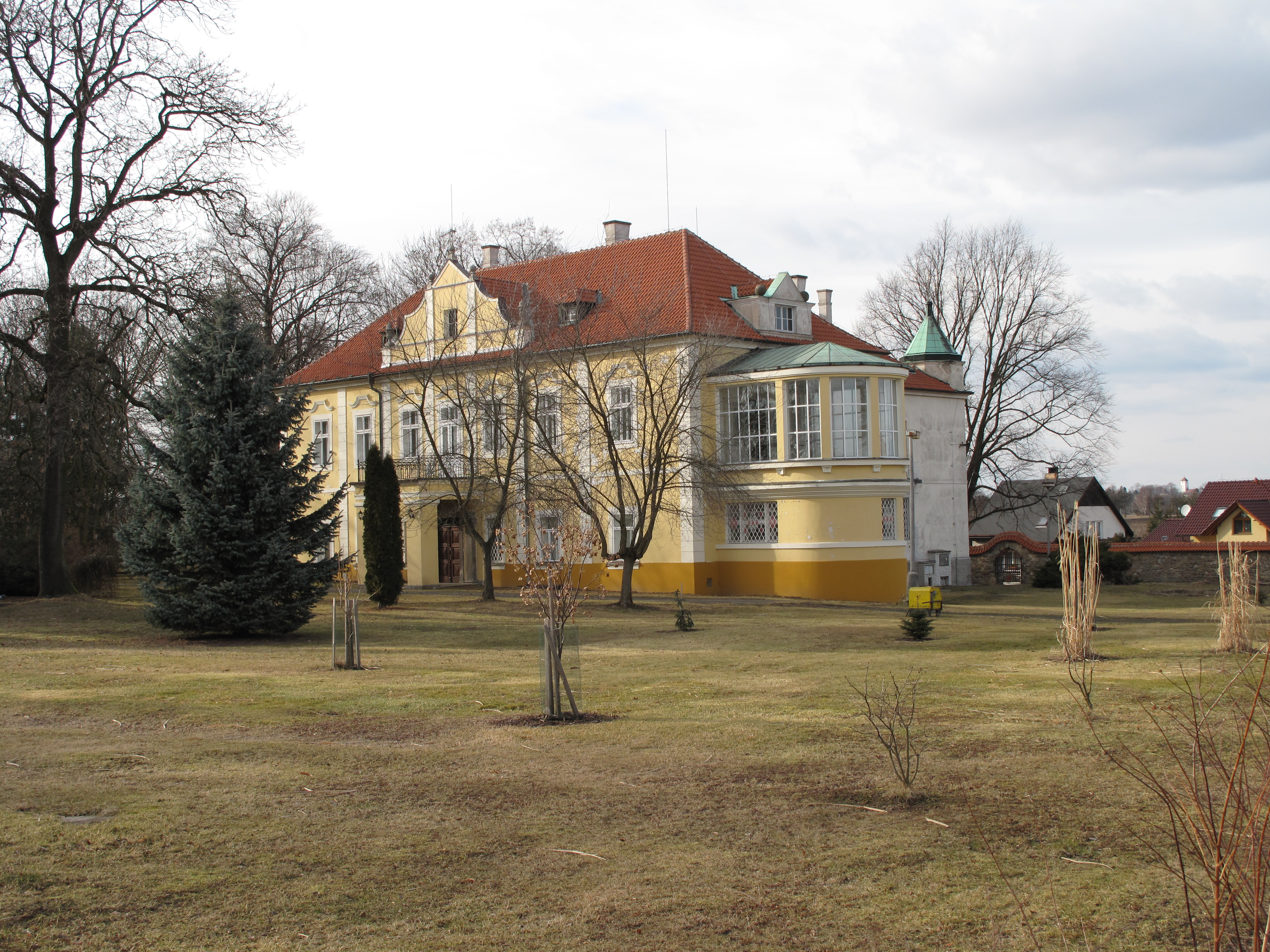
Starý zámek Ratboř

The oldest monument in Ratboř is the Church of Saint Wenceslaus. Originally a Gothic church, it was rebuilt in the Baroque style in 1673. The bell tower was added around 1700.

There are two small castles in the municipality. Starý zámek Ratboř ('Ratboř old castle') has medieval origin, but it was rebuilt in the Baroque style and then at the end of the 19th century. Nový zámek Ratboř ('Ratboř new castle') was built next to it in 1911–1915. It was built by the architect Jan Kotěra for the Mandelík family, owners of the local sugar refinery. Today, the new castle houses a hotel and restaurant. It is a significant example of modern architecture.

== Notable people ==
- Alfons von Czibulka (1888–1969), Czech-Austrian writer and painter
