= League of Lords =

League of high nobility against the rule of Wenceslas IV

- Panská jednota
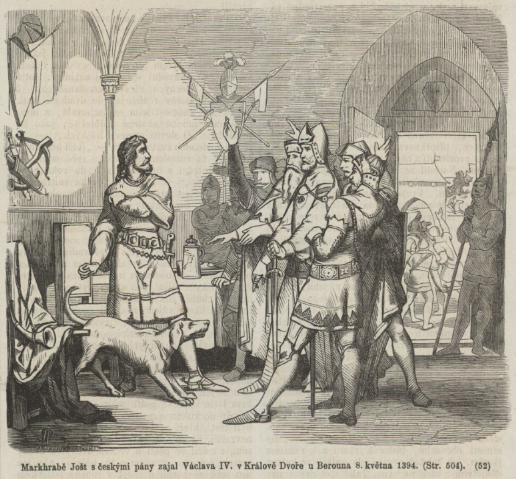
- The 1394 capture of Wenceslaus by Margrave Jobst
- Founded: 1394
- Dissolved: 1405
- Country: Kingdom of Bohemia

The League of Lords (Czech: Panská jednota) was an opposition group of feudal nobles dissatisfied with the rule of Wenceslaus IV of Bohemia, King of the Germans and the Romans and King of Bohemia. Lasting from 1394 to 1405, the goal of its members was to provide mutual support and gain co-government in the country.

== Formation ==
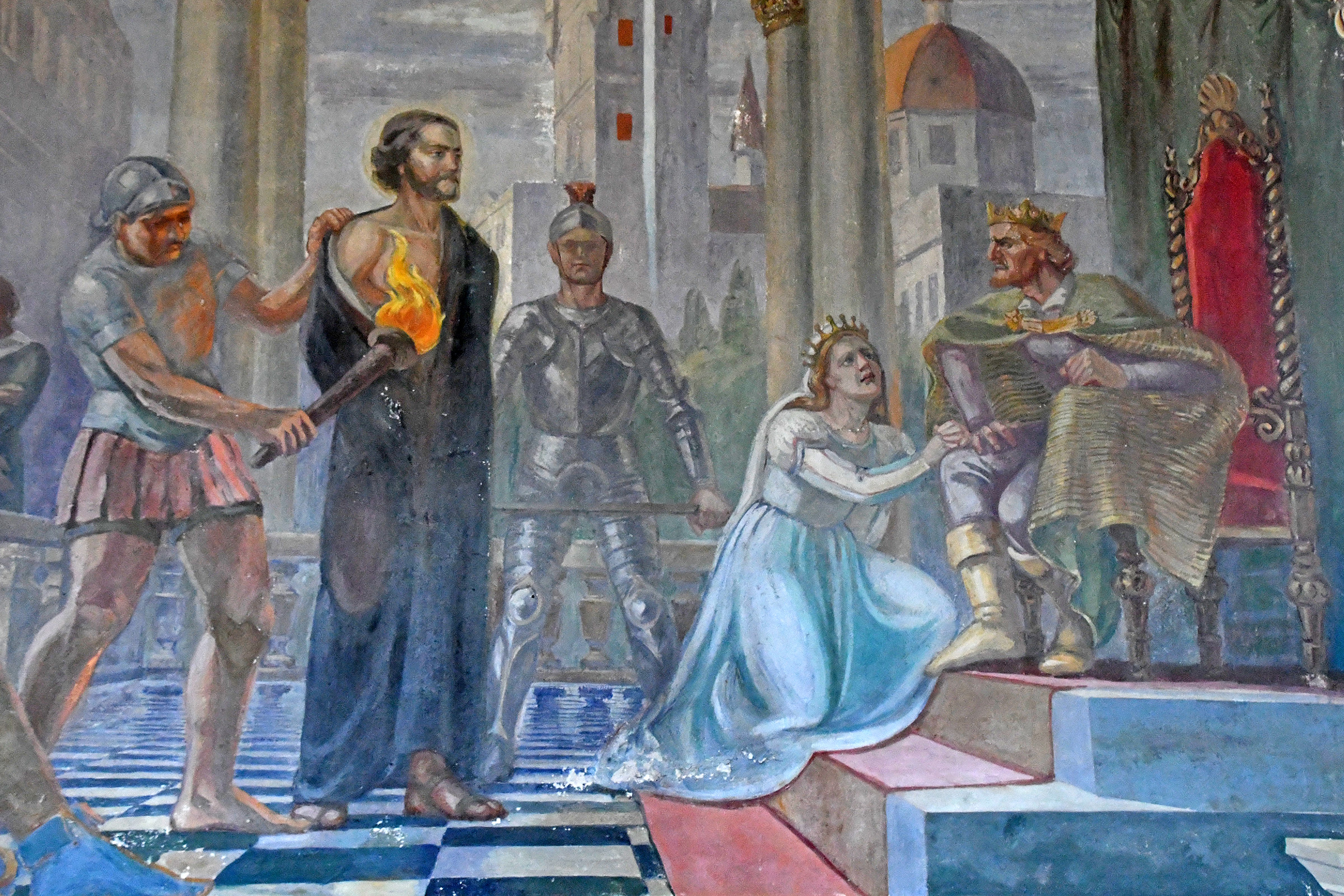
Fresco in Ghilvaci, Satu Mare depicting the torture of John of Nepomuk by Wenceslaus

After John of Nepomuk was murdered at the instigation of Wenceslaus in 1393, Jobst of Moravia lead an uprising against the king.

The League began to form in the spring of 1394. The group was closely allied with Margrave Jobst. Members were bothered not only by the manner of Wenceslaus' rule, but also by his preferential treatment of the lower nobility. The founding members were Henry III of Rosenberg, Jindřich III of Hradce, Vilém III of Landštejn, Otto III of Bergau, Břeněk of Skála, Jindřich Berka of Hohenštejn, John III of Michalovice, Boreš the Younger of Bečov and Rýzmburk, and Boček II of Poděbrady. They were later joined by other prominent noblemen such as Smil Flaška of Pardubice and Henry III of Lipá.

== Revolt ==
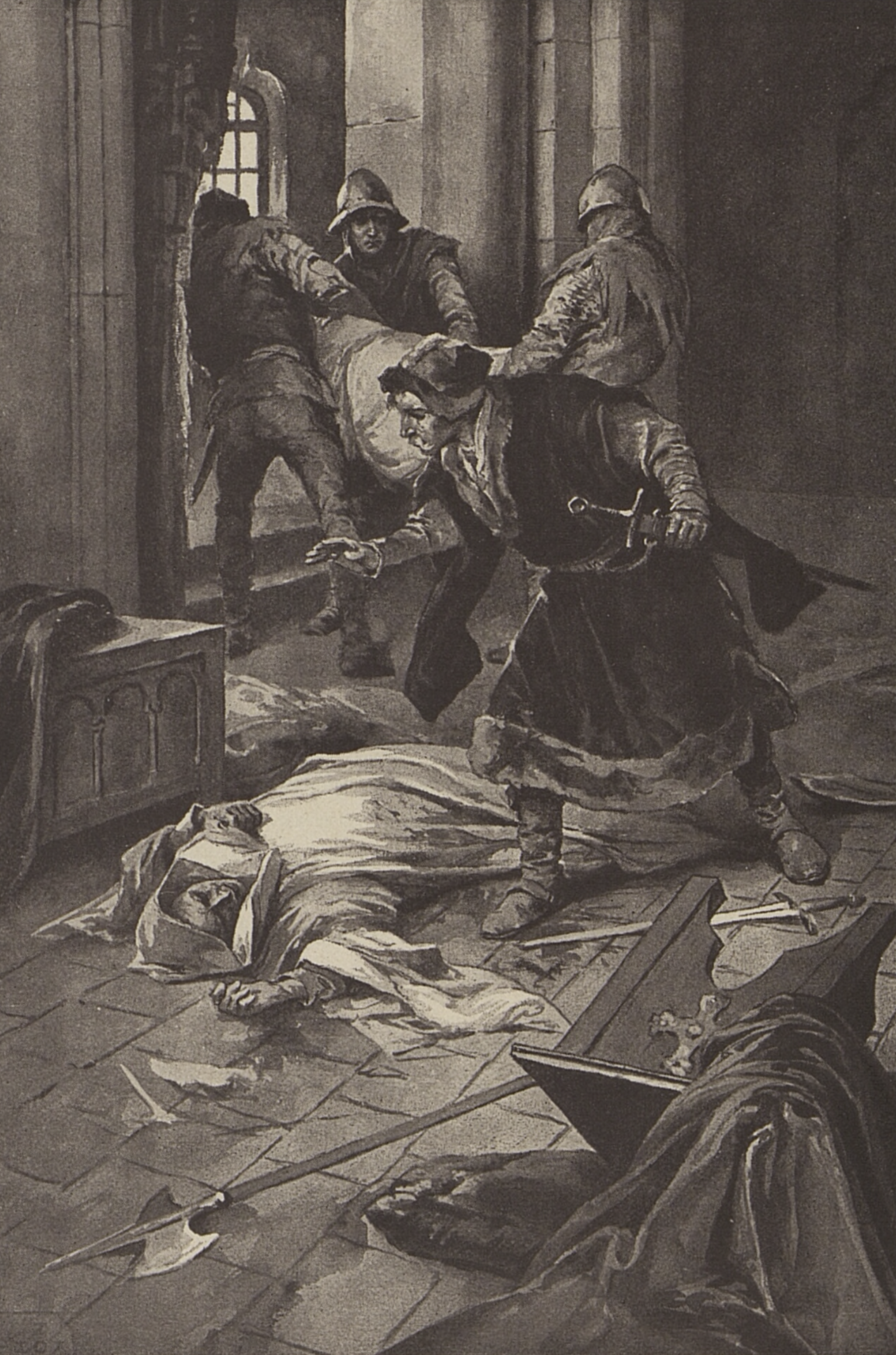
Murder of Wenceslaus' advisors at Karlštejn in 1397 (V. Černý, 1932)

On 8 May 1394, the League managed to capture Wenceslas in Králův Dvůr. Jobst was named as regent of the kingdom. However, John of Görlitz, Wenceslaus' half-brother, managed to raise an army of crown loyalists and negotiated the king's release on 1 August 1394. The League continued to operate against the crown. In 1395, troops led by Henry III of Rosenberg attacked the royal properties of Kuglvajt, Vodňany, and České Budějovice. John of Görlitz and Sigismund of Bohemia continued to mediate disputes. On 31 May 1396, Wenceslaus briefly arrested Margrave Jobst and six members of the League.

The League grew increasingly discontent with members of the lower nobility acting as advisors to the king. On 11 June 1397, four of Wenceslaus' advisors were assassinated at Karlštejn, as orchestrated by John II, Duke of Opava-Ratibor. John was able to convince Wenceslaus that the murdered were conspiring against the crown and went unpunished.

In 1401, the League of Lords supported Sigismund of Bohemia in his claim for the throne. On 29 June 1402, Sigismund captured Wenceslaus and took him to Vienna, where he remained imprisoned for more than a year before he managed to escape with the help of John II of Liechtenstein.

== Resolution ==
1405 marked the end of the Moravian Margrave Wars, with terms of peace negotiated between the rivaling members of the Luxembourg dynasty.

Wenceslaus, still titular King of Bohemia, reached a settlement with the League. Wenceslaus appointed more members of the high nobility to important positions, however, the king continued to decide for himself the composition of the royal council, including appointing members of the lower nobility.

== Historical significance ==
Czech historiography treats the League of Lords as a significant episode in the development of Bohemian noble constitutionalism. The capture of Wenceslaus at Králův Dvůr on 8 May 1394 marked a high point of baronial power against the Crown, and the partial concessions Wenceslaus made in the settlement established precedents for the noble councils that became central to the Hussite political order after 1419.

The League's immediate failure to stabilise Wenceslaus's reign is often read as evidence that late-medieval Bohemian politics could no longer be settled by elite compromise alone, a reading advanced in František Šmahel's multi-volume Die hussitische Revolution. The rise of the Hussite movement within a generation has made the League's short-lived concessions an object of sustained comparison with the later, more radical Hussite constitutional settlement.
