= Suchdol (Kutná Hora District) =

Market town in the Czech Republic

- Market town
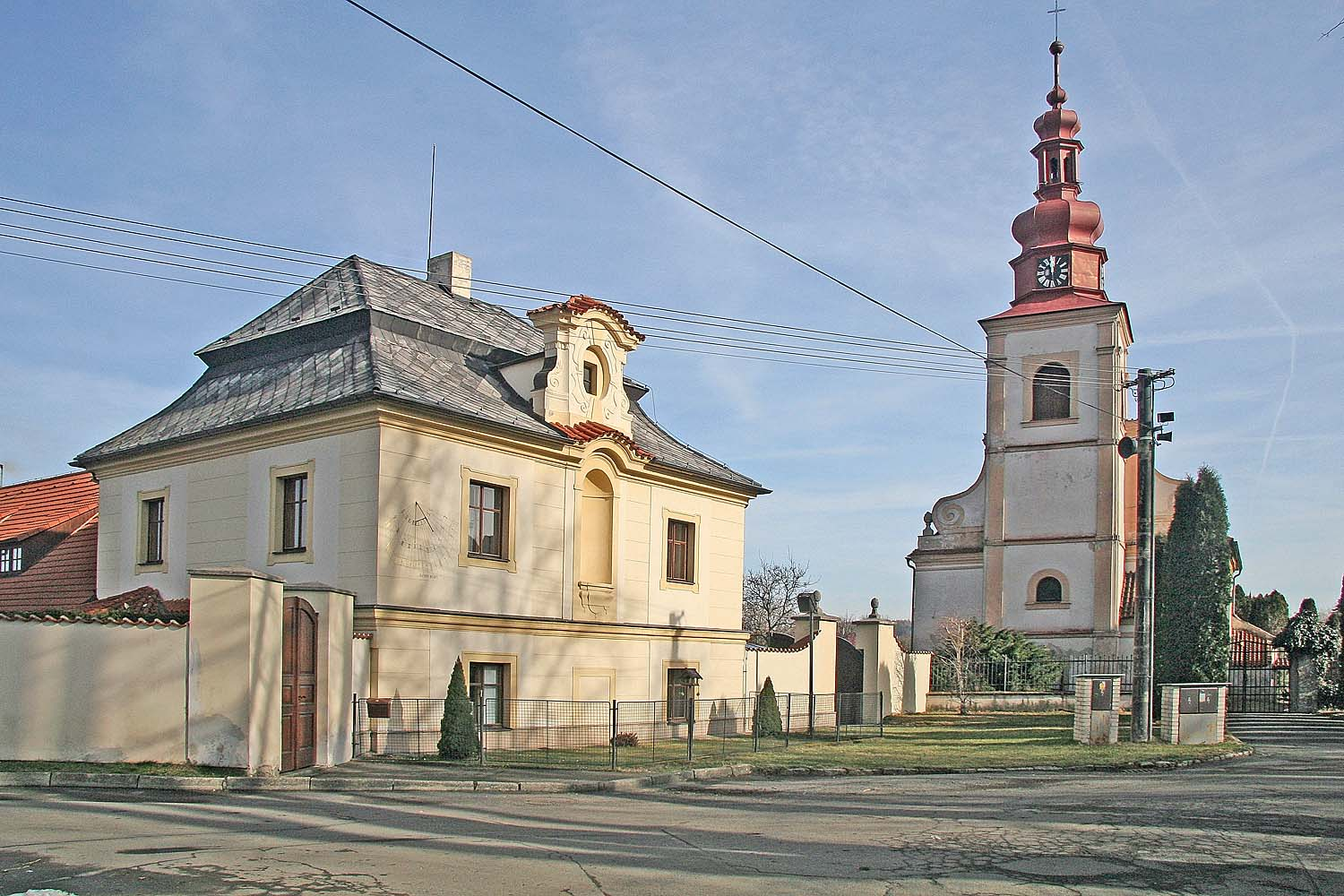
- Church of Saint Margaret

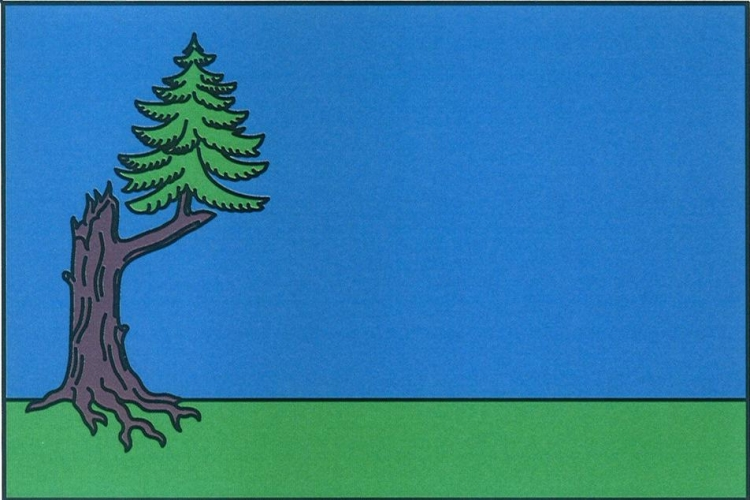
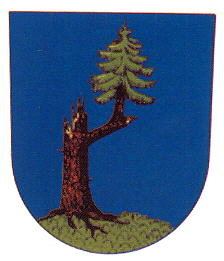
- Flag Coat of arms

- Location in the Czech Republic
- Coordinates: 49°57′9″N 15°10′0″E
- Country: Czech Republic
- Region: Central Bohemian
- District: Kutná Hora
- First mentioned: 1257

Area
  - Total: 19.30 km^{2} (7.45 sq mi)
- Elevation: 367 m (1,204 ft)

Population (2026-01-01)
  - Total: 1,108
  - Density: 57.41/km^{2} (148.7/sq mi)
- Time zone: UTC+1 (CET)
  - Summer (DST): UTC+2 (CEST)
- Postal code: 285 02
- Website: www.obecsuchdol.cz

Suchdol (Czech pronunciation: [ˈsuɦdol]) is a market town in Kutná Hora District in the Central Bohemian Region of the Czech Republic. It has about 1,100 inhabitants.

== Administrative division ==
Suchdol consists of five municipal parts (in brackets population according to the 2021 census):

- Suchdol (672)
- Dobřeň (199)
- Malenovice (51)
- Solopysky (78)
- Vysoká (72)

== Etymology ==
The name Suchdol is derived from suchý důl, i.e. 'dry valley' in Czech.

== Geography ==
Suchdol is located about 7 kilometres (4 mi) west of Kutná Hora and 47 km (29 mi) east of Prague. It lies in the Upper Sázava Hills. The highest point is the hill Vysoká at 471 m (1,545 ft) above sea level. The Polepka Stream originates here and flows across the municipal territory.

== History ==
The first written mention of Suchdol is from 1257. The village was promoted to a market town in 1562. In 1666, it was bought by the Sporck family and merged with the Lysá estate. Before it became separate municipality in 1848, it was part of the Malešov estate.

== Demographics ==
Historical population

Year	Pop.	±%
1869	1,493	—
1880	1,585	+6.2%
1890	1,580	−0.3%
1900	1,551	−1.8%
1910	1,520	−2.0%

Year	Pop.	±%
1921	1,518	−0.1%
1930	1,518	+0.0%
1950	1,160	−23.6%
1961	1,129	−2.7%
1970	1,072	−5.0%

Year	Pop.	±%
1980	1,065	−0.7%
1991	1,039	−2.4%
2001	1,048	+0.9%
2011	1,098	+4.8%
2021	1,072	−2.4%

Source: Censuses

== Transport ==
The I/2 road (the section from Prague to Kutná Hora) runs through the market town.

== Sights ==
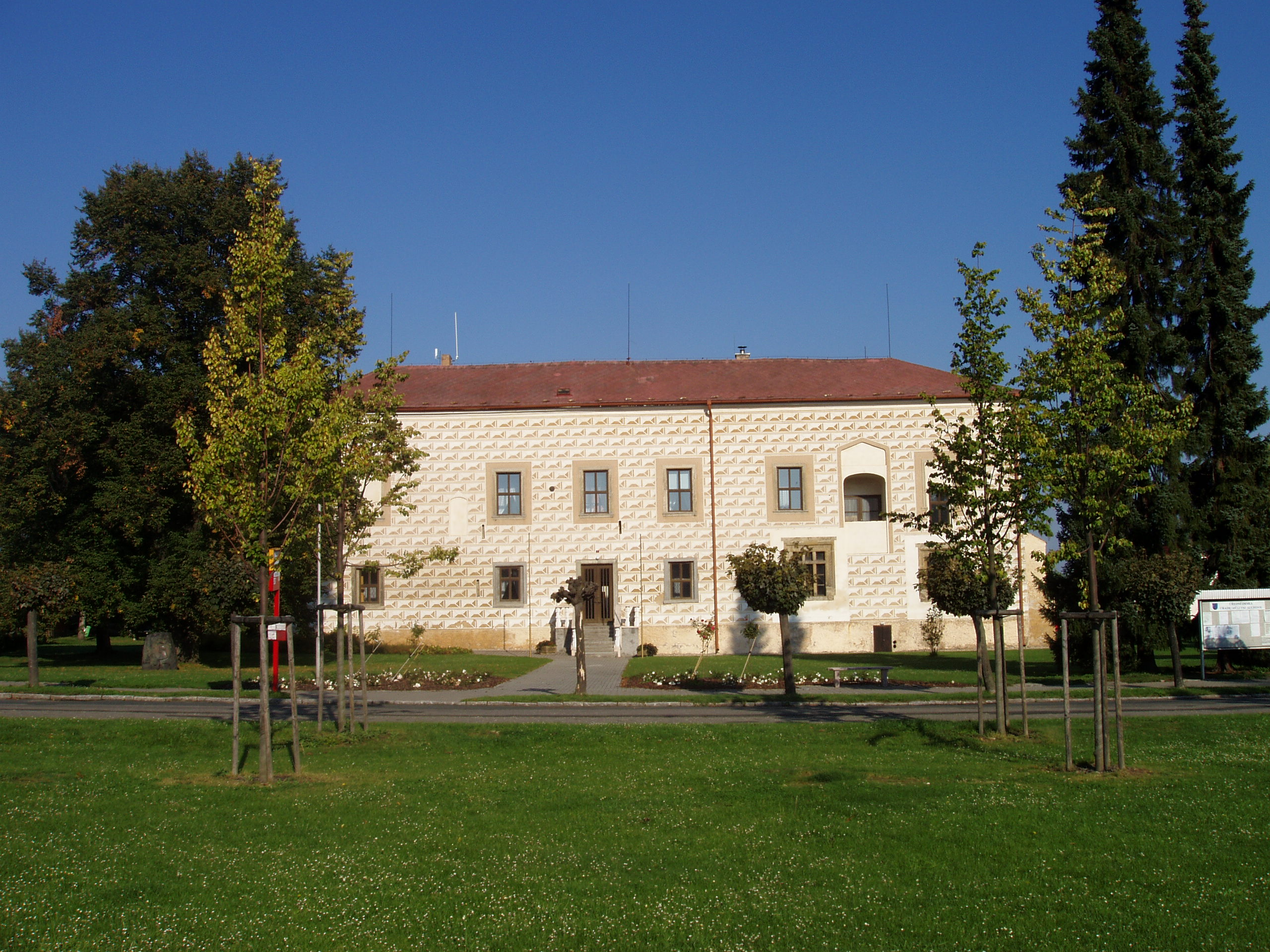
Suchdol Castle

An architectural landmark of Suchdol is the Suchdol Castle. The original Gothic fortress from the 14th century was rebuilt to the current form of a Renaissance castle in the 16th century. Baroque modifications were made in the mid-18th century. It is decorated with sgraffiti. In the second half of the 20th century, the building served as a school and library. Today it houses the municipal office.

The Church of Saint Margaret is located next to the castle. It was probably built around 1280. Baroque reconstruction took place in 1746–1747.

There are three other churches in the villages within the municipal territory: Church of the Visitation of the Virgin Mary in Vysoká, Church of Saint Wenceslaus in Dobřeň, and Church of Saint Bartholomew in Solopysky.

On Vysoká Hill is a ruin of the Chapel of Saint John the Baptist, now called "Belveder". It was founded by Franz Anton von Sporck and built in 1695–1697, but it was destroyed by fire after being struck by lightning in 1834. Next to the chapel is a 40 m (130 ft) high steel observation tower, which also serves as a telecommunications tower.

== Notable people ==
- František Kmoch (1848–1912), composer and conductor; lived and worked here as a teacher in 1869–1873

== In popular culture ==
A recreation of Suchdol and its castle as it existed in c. 1403 is depicted in the 2025 Czech role-playing game Kingdom Come: Deliverance II.
