= Užice (disambiguation) =

Užice is a city in Serbia.

Uzice, Užice, or Úžice may also refer to:

- Úžice (Kutná Hora District), a municipality and village in the Central Bohemian Region, Czech Republic
- Úžice (Mělník District), a municipality and village in the Central Bohemian Region, Czech Republic
- Republic of Užice, a short-lived military mini-state that existed in 1941 in occupied Yugoslavia
- The Republic of Užice, a 1974 Yugoslav film commonly known as Guns of War
- Užice Oblast, one of the Subdivisions of the Kingdom of Yugoslavia#Oblasts (1922–1929)
