= Přibyslavice =

Přibyslavice may refer to places in the Czech Republic:

- Přibyslavice (Brno-Country District), a municipality and village in the Central Bohemian Region
- Přibyslavice (Třebíč District), a municipality and village in the Central Bohemian Region
- Přibyslavice, a village and part of Vlkaneč in the Central Bohemian Region
- Přibyslavice, a village and part of Všelibice in the Liberec Region
- Přibyslavice (Stříbrná Skalice), a former village in the Central Bohemian Region
