= Benátky =

Benátky may refer to places in the Czech Republic:

- Benátky (Hradec Králové District), a municipality and village in the Hradec Králové Region
- Benátky (Svitavy District), a municipality and village in the Pardubice Region
- Benátky, a village and part of Jimramov in the Vysočina Region
- Benátky, a village and part of Pelhřimov in the Vysočina Region
- Benátky, a village and part of Úžice in the Central Bohemian Region
- Benátky, a village and part of Ždírec nad Doubravou in the Vysočina Region
- Benátky nad Jizerou, a town in the Central Bohemian Region

== See also ==
- Venice, a city in Italy called Benátky in Czech and Slovak
