= Podveky =

- Municipality
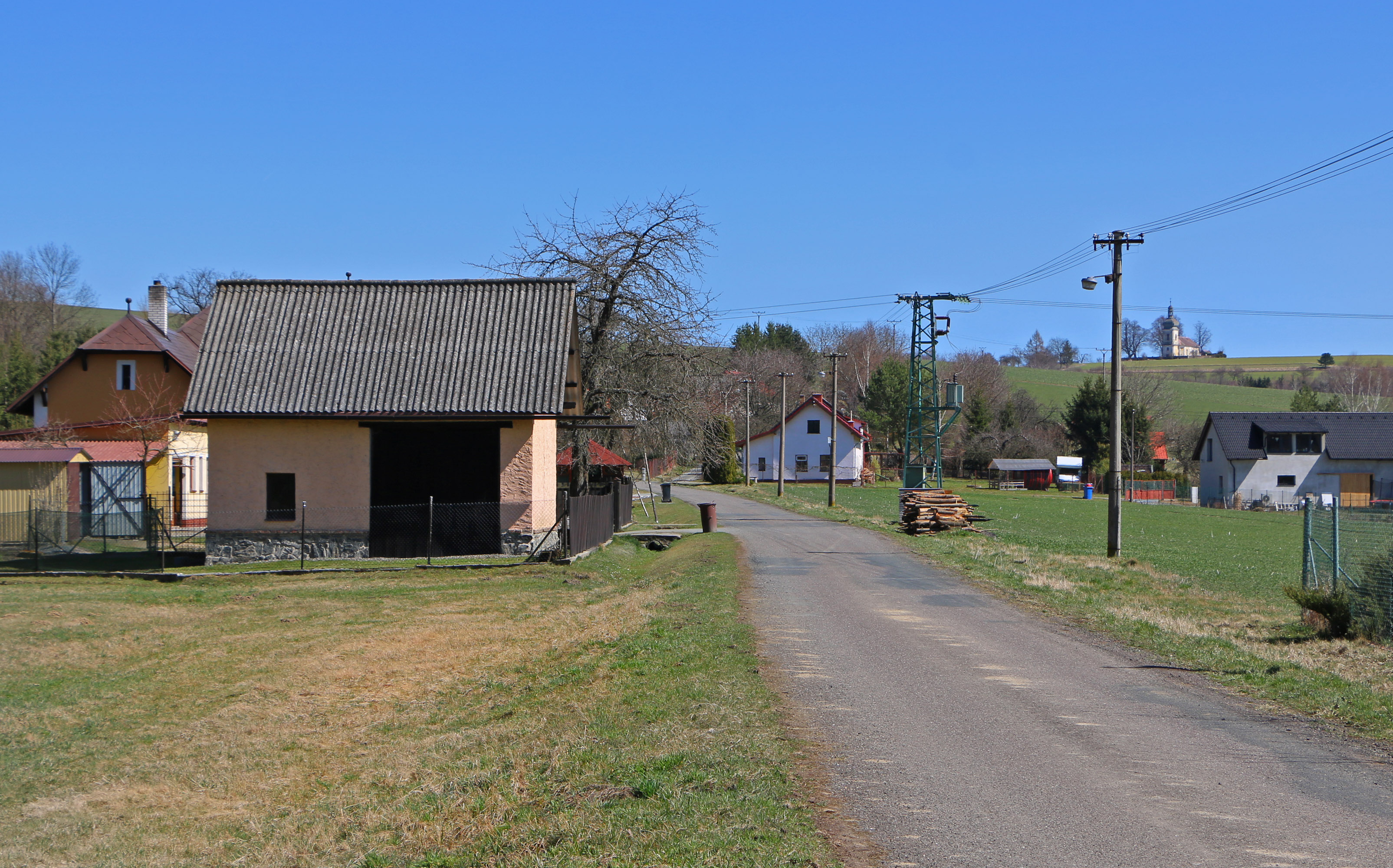
- Zalíbená, a part of Podveky

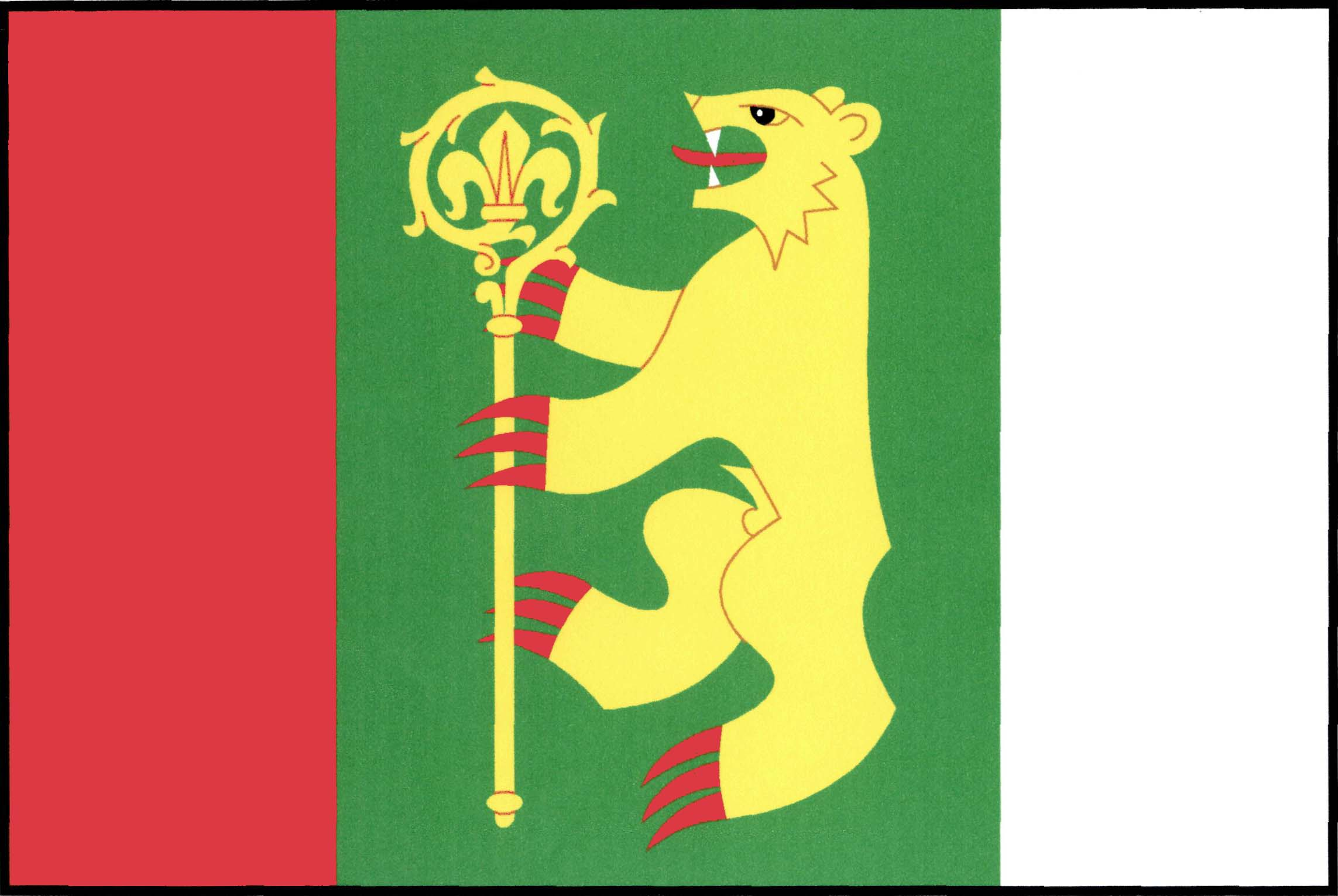
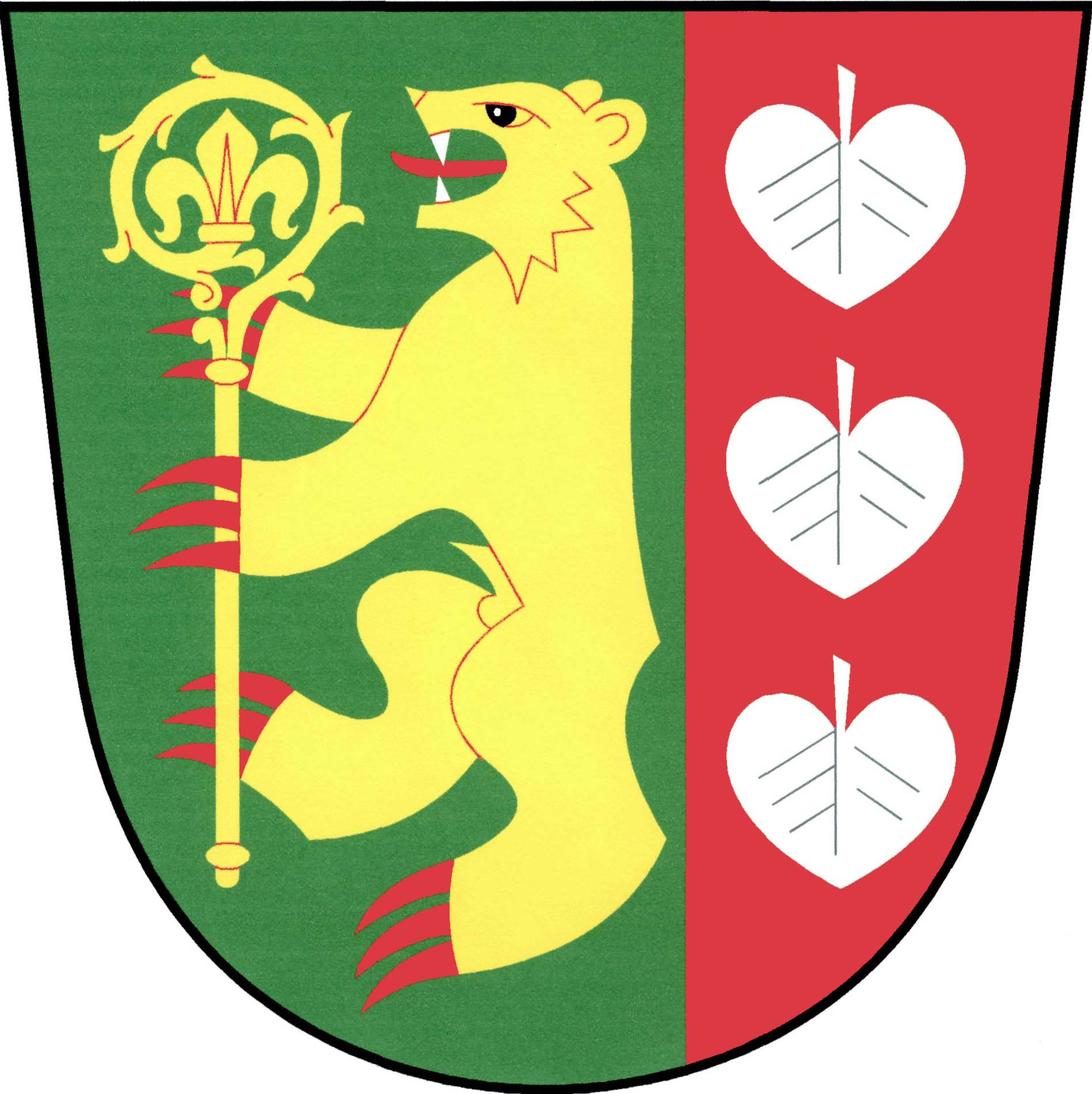
- Flag Coat of arms

- Location in the Czech Republic
- Coordinates: 49°49′30″N 14°59′39″E
- Country: Czech Republic
- Region: Central Bohemian
- District: Kutná Hora
- First mentioned: 1295

Area
  - Total: 10.28 km^{2} (3.97 sq mi)
- Elevation: 466 m (1,529 ft)

Population (2026-01-01)
  - Total: 228
  - Density: 22.2/km^{2} (57.4/sq mi)
- Time zone: UTC+1 (CET)
  - Summer (DST): UTC+2 (CEST)
- Postal code: 285 06
- Website: www.podveky.cz

Podveky is a municipality and village in Kutná Hora District in the Central Bohemian Region of the Czech Republic. It has about 200 inhabitants.

== Administrative division ==
Podveky consists of four municipal parts (in brackets population according to the 2021 census):

- Podveky (147)
- Ježovice (24)
- Útěchvosty (23)
- Zalíbená (21)

== Etymology ==
The name Podveky was derived from the Old Czech word poděvek, denoting a person who hides or throws something away, but also a weakling or a desperate person. The initial name of the village was Poděveky, meaning "the village where poděveks live". At the turn of the 14th and 15th centuries, the name was distorted to Podveky.

== Geography ==
Podveky is located 23 kilometres (14 mi) southwest of Kutná Hora and 42 km (26 mi) southeast of Prague. It lies in the Vlašim Uplands. The highest point is the hill Čihadlo at 486 m (1,594 ft) above sea level. Several brooks originate in the municipal territory.

== History ==
The first written mention of Podveky is from 1295. From the second half of the 17th century until the establishment of an independent municipality in 1848, Podveky was part of the Rataje estate.

== Demographics ==
Historical population

Year	Pop.	±%
1869	791	—
1880	780	−1.4%
1890	765	−1.9%
1900	798	+4.3%
1910	711	−10.9%

Year	Pop.	±%
1921	699	−1.7%
1930	561	−19.7%
1950	426	−24.1%
1961	378	−11.3%
1970	343	−9.3%

Year	Pop.	±%
1980	279	−18.7%
1991	260	−6.8%
2001	213	−18.1%
2011	210	−1.4%
2021	215	+2.4%

Source: Censuses

== Transport ==
The railway line Kolín–Ledečko crosses the northern part of the municipality, but there is no train station. The municipality is served by the station in neighbouring Rataje nad Sázavou.

== Sights ==
The main landmark of Podveky is the Church of Saint Gall. It was built in the late Baroque style in 1783 on the site of an older church. The core of the tower and the church bell, made in 1503, have been preserved from the original church.
