= Stříbrná Skalice =

- Municipality
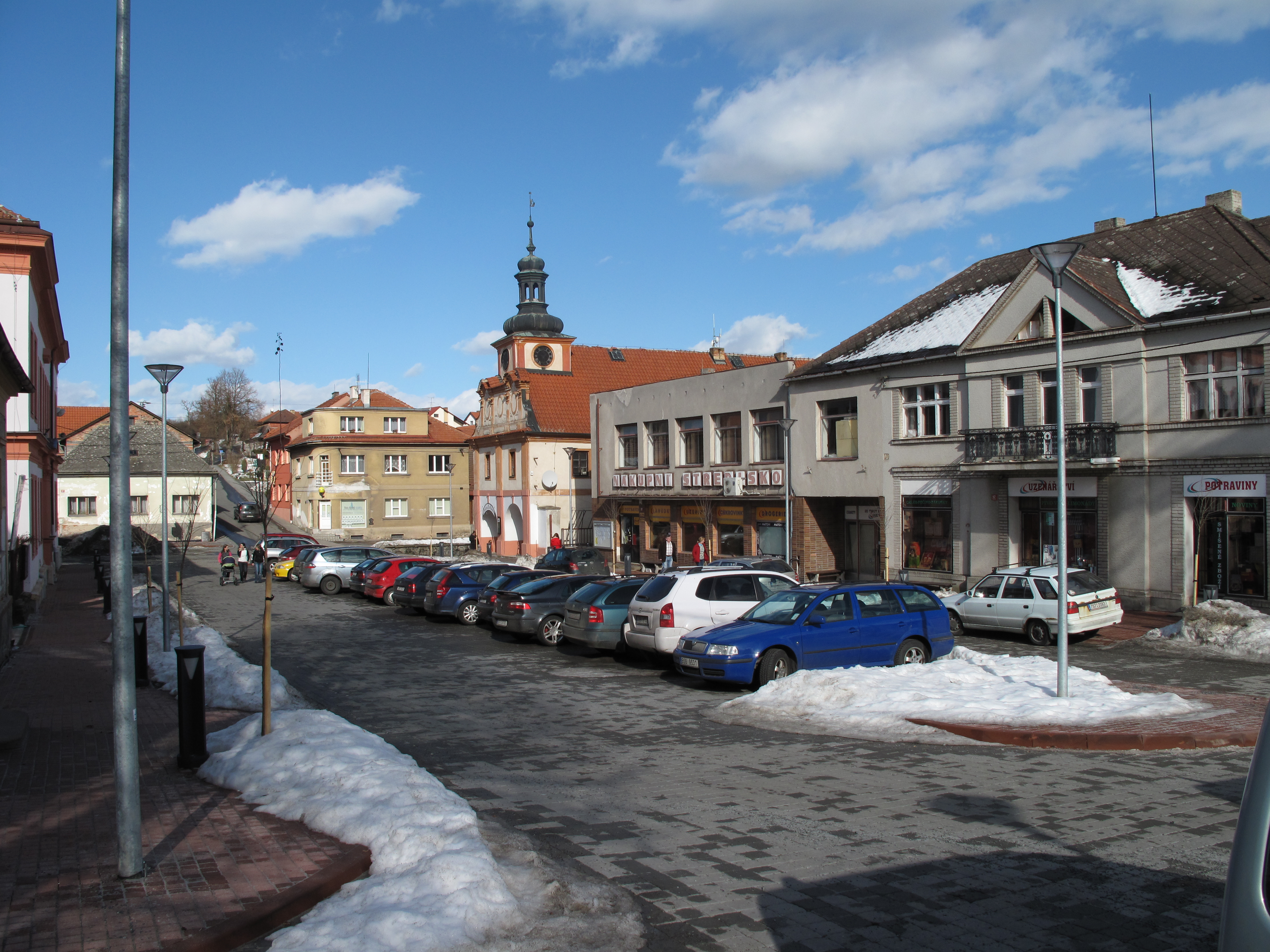
- Square in Stříbrná Skalice

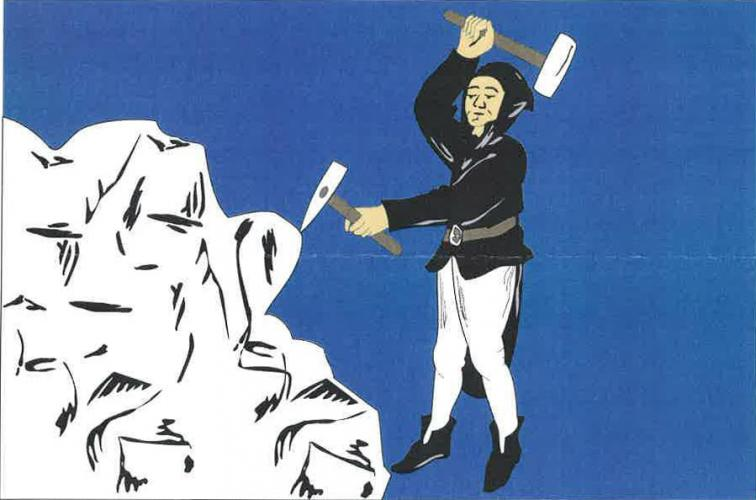
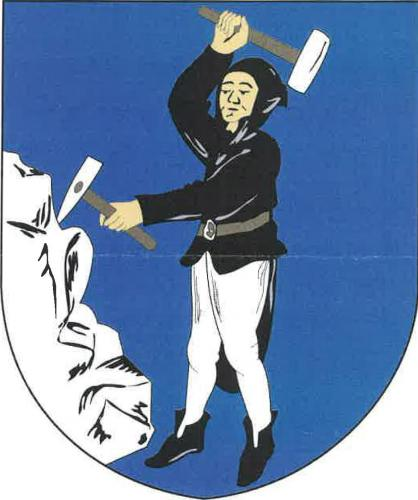
- Flag Coat of arms

- Location in the Czech Republic
- Coordinates: 49°53′52″N 14°50′46″E
- Country: Czech Republic
- Region: Central Bohemian
- District: Prague-East
- First mentioned: 1360

Area
  - Total: 24.44 km^{2} (9.44 sq mi)
- Elevation: 337 m (1,106 ft)

Population (2026-01-01)
  - Total: 1,607
  - Density: 65.75/km^{2} (170.3/sq mi)
- Time zone: UTC+1 (CET)
  - Summer (DST): UTC+2 (CEST)
- Postal codes: 281 63, 281 67
- Website: www.stribrnaskalice.cz

Stříbrná Skalice (German: Silber Skalitz) is a municipality and village in Prague-East District in the Central Bohemian Region of the Czech Republic. It has about 1,600 inhabitants. The municipality is located on the Sázava River in the Benešov Uplands.

== Administrative division ==
Stříbrná Skalice consists of four municipal parts (in brackets population according to the 2021 census):

- Stříbrná Skalice (996)
- Hradec (76)
- Hradové Střimelice (215)
- Kostelní Střimelice (238)

== Etymology ==
The name Stříbrná Skalice means 'little silver rock'. The settlement was originally named Skalice hor stříbrných, i.e. 'the little rock of silver mountains'. The name reflects the long mining history of the settlement.

== Geography ==
Stříbrná Skalice is located about 26 kilometres (16 mi) southeast of Prague. It lies in the Benešov Uplands. The highest point is the hill Skalkaat 516 m (1,693 ft) above sea level. The municipality is situated on the right bank of the Sázava River. There are several fishponds, the largest of which are Hruškov and Propast.

== History ==
The first written mention of Skalice is from 1360. The first recorded owners were allegedly Ctibor of Skalice (1360–1362), followed by Střížek of Skalice (1376), Kuneš of Skalice (1377), Ješek of Skalice (1384–1392), Jan of Střímelice (1393) and Bohdal of Drahenice and Skalice (1402–1403).

In 1403, Skalice passed over to King Wenceslaus IV whose burgrave in the Skalice Castle was Racek Kobyla of Dvorce. Later that year, Skalice was besieged by the army of King Sigismund, and was conquered and burned. Wenceslaus then donated Skalice to Jan Sokol of Lamberk in December 1403. In the years 1413–1415, Skalice was ruled by Kolman of Křikava, and then later became the property of the Sázava Monastery. In 1417, Stříbrná Skalice was first referred to as a market town.

In 1436, Sigismund pledged the town to Jan Zajímač of Kunštát, under whose family it remained until 1567. However, due to the financial difficulties of the nobility, expansion of Stříbrná Skalice partially stopped several times in this period (1508 and 1528). In 1573, Jaroslav Smiřický bought the town for Václav, Kateřina and Markéta, orphans of his brother. Since then, it passed ownership several times and ended up being acquired by the Liechtensteins.

In 1715, the inhabitants of Skalice turned to the Duke of Savoy to build a new town hall at the municipal's expense, in order to restore the autonomy of the town and the granting of old privileges. On 23 October 1715, the request was confirmed by the nobility and in 1719 a new town hall was built. Stříbrná Skalice was also granted the privileges to hold markets on 3 March 1757.

Until 1865, there was no proper road leading to the market town, only forest roads and the surrounding fields. The first road connection was built in 1866 to Kostelec nad Černými lesy. Later, the Sázava railway was built between 1899 and 1901, with regular transport commencing on 7 August 1901. The Pyskočely stop was renamed Stříbrná Skalice in 1903. However, the stop was on the other side of the Sázava river, so an iron truss bridge was made in 1946. The present-day concrete bridge was built in the early 1970s.

The village of Rovná was integrated with Skalice in 1935, and Hradec, Hradové Střimelice, and Kostelní Střimelice were merged in 1964. The areas of the abandoned villages of Kozly and Přibyslavice also belong to the municipality.

=== Silver mining ===
The municipality is connected with the silver mining that took place in surrounding areas in 15th and 16th century. The Skalice mines were the closest to Prague and gave impulse to the construction of a Prague mint during the reign of Ferdinand I (1526–1564). This event has become an important moment in the history of Skalice as a mining town. The oldest silver sealer from 1610 is stored in the Kolín State Regional Archive.

In the 18th century the silver was depleted. In Stříbrná Skalice there are still preserved old mining shafts.

== Demographics ==
Historical population

Year	Pop.	±%
1869	1,847	—
1880	2,017	+9.2%
1890	2,033	+0.8%
1900	1,952	−4.0%
1910	1,741	−10.8%

Year	Pop.	±%
1921	1,662	−4.5%
1930	1,510	−9.1%
1950	1,247	−17.4%
1961	1,339	+7.4%
1970	1,197	−10.6%

Year	Pop.	±%
1980	1,050	−12.3%
1991	949	−9.6%
2001	946	−0.3%
2011	1,207	+27.6%
2021	1,525	+26.3%

Source: Censuses

== Transport ==
There are no railways or major roads passing through the municipality.

== Sights ==
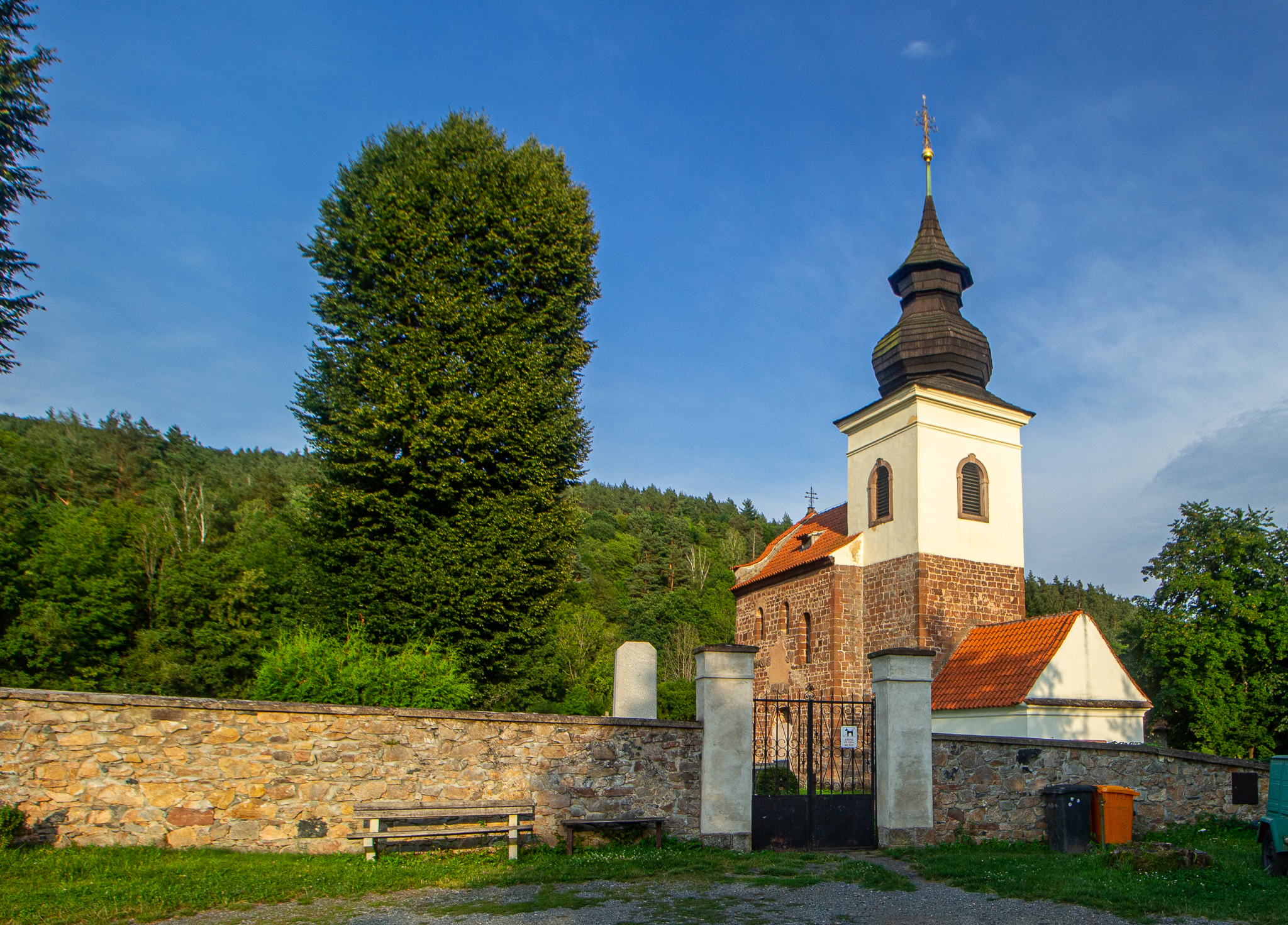
Church of Saint James the Great

The most valuable building is the Church of Saint James the Great. It was built in the Romanesque style at the end of 12th century and rebuilt around 1240. Further modifications were made in the 16th and 18th centuries. The church has a Baroque onion-shaped dome. The interior is decorated with rare Romanesque wall paintings.

The second church in Stříbrná Skalice is the Church of Saint John of Nepomuk. It was built in the Baroque style in 1730. It was built on the remains of a medieval castle.

An architecturally valuable building is the town hall. It is a Baroque house dating from 1719. In the 19th and 20th centuries, it was modified to its present form.

The Church of Saint Martin is located in Kostelní Střimelice. It was built in the Baroque style in the 18th century, but it contains the remains of a Gothic church from the 14th century.

== In popular culture ==
The village of Stříbrná Skalice features prominently in the video game Kingdom Come: Deliverance. Rovná and Přibyslavice feature as villages separate from Skalice.

== Notable people ==
- Ladislav Štaidl (1945–2021), songwriter and musician
