= Jan Valta =

Music composer

- Born: 1977 (age 48–49); Prague, Czechoslovakia
- Occupation: composer
- Known for: Kingdom Come: Deliverance and Kingdom Come: Deliverance II soundtrack

Jan Valta (born 1977) is a Czech composer, conductor, and violinist, best known for his work on the video game series Kingdom Come: Deliverance. He also worked as an orchestrator for Atli Örvarsson for the Czech film Colette.

== Early life ==
Valta was born in 1977 in Prague. According to an interview on KCD's website, Valta was born into a family of classical music. His father, also named Jan, was a composer while his mother was a pianist, and Valta himself began playing the violin at age five. Valta said he "grew up" with classical composers like Antonín Dvořák, Mozart and Maurice Ravel, which influenced his later works. He graduated from the Teplice Conservatoire where he studied both violin and conducting as well as the Academy of Performing Arts in Prague where he studied the violin. During his studies he was a prizewinner at a nation-wide competition of chamber music; he is also a prizewinner of the Czech Conservatories Competition. He and Sporka are cousins.

== Work on Kingdom Come: Deliverance ==
Valta began working on the soundtrack for KCD with Adam Sporka in the summer of 2014 for the alpha teaser trailer. A major theme of KCD, which takes place in 1400s Bohemia, was an attempt to be historically accurate "as much as possible." According to Dr. James Cook, there is not much extant early music from the place and time period, where Mensural notation was only just beginning to come into use. This makes it difficult to simply reuse existing medieval scores from that time period, with Cook noting about 19 possible works that could be used. Such a possibility is additionally complicated by the usage of adaptive music in video games, which requires works to be specifically composed to transition in line with different possible game states. Valta sought to convey a sense believable medievalness and keep a consistent theme throughout the track. Cook describes the historical accuracy of the soundtrack as varying depending on the context, with the monastic chants being the most "recognizably medievalist." Cook notes that the term "authenticity" has "become a dirty word" within historical music scholarship, and suggests that Valta's work could help it be "re-habilitated."

=== Soundtrack ===
The score consists of 2 to 3 minute pieces called ‘atmospheres’ and shorter ones called ‘nibbles.’ The segments are tied to specific locations in game, with multiple scenes for the same location. Generally, an atmosphere will be played followed by up to three nibbles after which the next atmosphere will begin, with varying lengths of silence between the pieces based on the length of the current atmosphere. There are strong leitmotifs throughout the game as well as about 30 themes, which link together the different environments. The soundtrack can also be viewed as split between three main environments: pastoral environments, urban environments and monastic environments. The monastic pieces include Gregorian chants composed by Sporka, which consist of a capella performed by low male voices, with the text used being from the Kyrie, Gloria in excelsis Deo, Agnus Dei and Credo from the Ordinary of the Mass. Cook describes the chants as "excellent examples of medievalism at work," noting in "Credo" the lack of barlines and time signatures. The rhythm in "Credo" is dictated by the rhythm of the text while the phrasing is dictated by the end of phrases of the text, making the phrases uneven. Cook Describes the tavern music as "quasi-authentic," noting their use of the recorder, shawm, lute, vielle and crumhorn, as well as the deliberate breaking of tonal expectations, which "convey[s] a real sense of antiquity." The orchestral pieces, however, are less authentic both in the instruments used – such as the French horn – and in its harmonic approach, which "leans far more heavily towards the film or game score."

=== Adaptive music ===
Sporka, who is a programmer as well as a musician, designed an adaptive music system together with Valta called Sequence Music Engine for CryEngine that can transition the music played in-game based on changes in the game state. Using Sporka's engine, the scenes can be broken up into patterns, which consist of "Intros", "Branches," and "Cinematic Elements" ("Cinels"). The Intro is used when transitioning to a new scene, and the branches are used to loop within the currently playing one, while the Cinels are used to glue two scenes during a transition.

=== Awards ===
Valta and Sporka received the Special Achievement in Multimedia Award from the International Festival of Film Music and Multimedia Soundtrack Poděbrady for their work on KCD in 2018. In 2024, he won the award for Most Successful Composer of Classical Music and Classical Composition of the Year from the OSA, Czech Republic's copyright protection association.

== Other works ==
Valta composed for Zbojník, a Czech film set in the 13th century.
