= Kingdom Come: Deliverance =

2018 video game

- Developer: Warhorse Studios (Note: Nintendo Switch port by Saber Interactive)
- Publisher: Deep Silver (Note: Warhorse Studios self-published the Microsoft Windows version for digital release.)
- Director: Daniel Vávra
- Producers: Martin Klíma; Prokop Jirsa; Kateřina Matějíčková
- Designer: Viktor Bocan
- Programmer: Tomáš Blaho
- Artist: Mikuláš Podprocký
- Writer: Daniel Vávra
- Composers: Jan Valta; Adam Sporka
- Series: Kingdom Come
- Engine: CryEngine
- Platforms: Microsoft Windows; PlayStation 4; Xbox One; Nintendo Switch; Amazon Luna; PlayStation 5; Xbox Series X/S
- Release: Microsoft Windows, PlayStation 4, Xbox One; 13 February 2018; Nintendo Switch; 15 March 2024; PlayStation 5, Xbox Series X/S; 13 February 2026
- Genre: Action role-playing
- Mode: Single-player

Kingdom Come: Deliverance is a 2018 action role-playing video game developed by Warhorse Studios and published by Deep Silver. It is the first entry in the Kingdom Come series. The game is set in the late medieval Kingdom of Bohemia, an Imperial State of the Holy Roman Empire, and takes place during a war in Bohemia in 1403, during the time of King Wenceslaus IV. After mercenaries raid his village, commoner Henry joins the service of Lord Radzig Kobyla, who leads a resistance movement against the invading Hungarian king Sigismund. As Henry pursues justice, he becomes involved in an effort to restore Wenceslaus to the throne. The game features branching quest lines in an open-world environment, and focuses on period-accurate content.

Kingdom Come: Deliverance was released for PlayStation 4, Windows, and Xbox One on 13 February 2018, on 15 March 2024 for Nintendo Switch, and on 13 February 2026 for PlayStation 5 and Xbox Series X/S. The game received generally positive reviews for PC, and mixed reviews for consoles; critics praised the story and characters, but were divided over its attention to detail and focus on realism, and criticised its technical bugs and save system. Some commentators, historians, and scholars criticised the game's portrayal of certain ethnic groups, particularly the Cumans. It sold over 10 million units by May 2025. A sequel, Kingdom Come: Deliverance II, was released in February 2025. A third game in the franchise is set to be released during Warhorse's 2027 fiscal year.

== Gameplay ==
In the game, Henry can explore the game's open world while riding on horseback.

Kingdom Come: Deliverance is an action role-playing video game set in an open-world environment and played from a first-person perspective. It utilises a classless role-playing system, allowing the player to customise their skills to take on roles such as warrior, bard, thief, or a hybrid of these. Abilities and stats grow depending on what the player does and says through branched dialogue trees. During conversations, the time a player takes to make a decision is limited and has an effect on their relationships with others. Reputation is based on player choices and therefore can bring consequences.

Character bodies and faces are created through the combination of multiple, individual pieces with finishing touches. The clothing system features 16 item slots and items on many areas of the body that can be layered. For example, a heavily armored knight may on his upper body wear a gambeson, followed by mail and plate armour, with a tabard or surcoat over top, for a total of four clothing items in the chest slots. Each clothing type provides different levels of protection against different types of weapons. Clothing also gets progressively more worn, dirty, or bloody through use, affecting the character's appearance. The player is able to use a variety of weapons, including swords, knives, axes, hammers, and bows. Horses are featured heavily in the game, and are designed to act with their own AI while under the player's control, moving or jumping to avoid small obstacles or dangers. The player can also fight from horseback and use their steed to carry items if they need additional inventory space, but warhorses are also competent combatants with their own AI. Steeds come with five slots for armor and attachments.

Kingdom Come: Deliverance also features a needs system which requires the player to sleep and eat in order to stay healthy. Equipment and clothing also degrade and require repair. Foodstuffs and other perishable items will spoil over time. The game uses skill/stat-based mini-games for many of these tasks, including weapon and armor repair, as well as for gathering new items by picking locks or pockets, distilling alcohol, or creating medicines. The game uses long- and short-ranged weapons in combat which is based on a physics system using inverse kinematics to determine the reactions of both combatants based on the speed and weight of a blow. This system aims to add greater variety and realism to the combat, coupled with a variety of basic combat moves and combination moves, some of which can be unlocked by skill points. Different weapons have different characteristics, making them useful for different purposes. For example, a sword is a quick weapon for striking and parrying, but it is not very effective against heavy armor.

Quests are intended to be nonlinear, with multiple ways to complete objectives to allow multiple character types to be viable. The storyline features some large-scale events such as castle sieges and large battles. Every non-player character (NPC) has a daily routine, and every routine can be affected by the player. Characters are able to react to all player actions and adjust their routines to them. NPCs will report crimes to authorities, who will punish the player accordingly, either with a fine or time in jail. Crime will affect economics, and people will get suspicious or aggressive after unresolved crimes.

== Synopsis ==
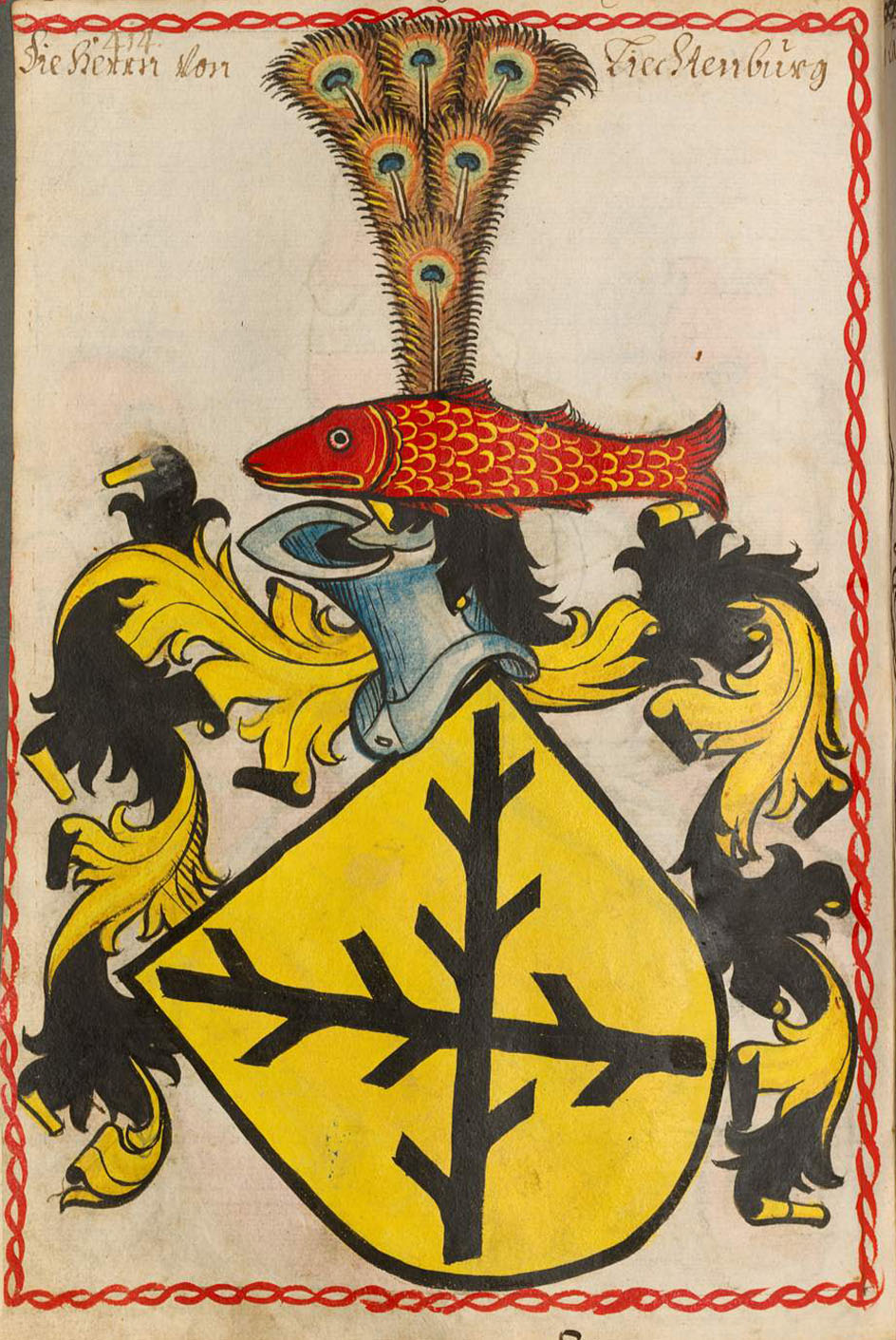
The noble family of House of Pirkstein and their coat of arms is featured in the game. (Note: The Czech noble family of House of Pirkstein (cs) is a sub-branch of the prominent House of Leipa (cs). Their coat of arms is identical to the coat of arms of the House of Lichtenburg (cs) (displayed).)

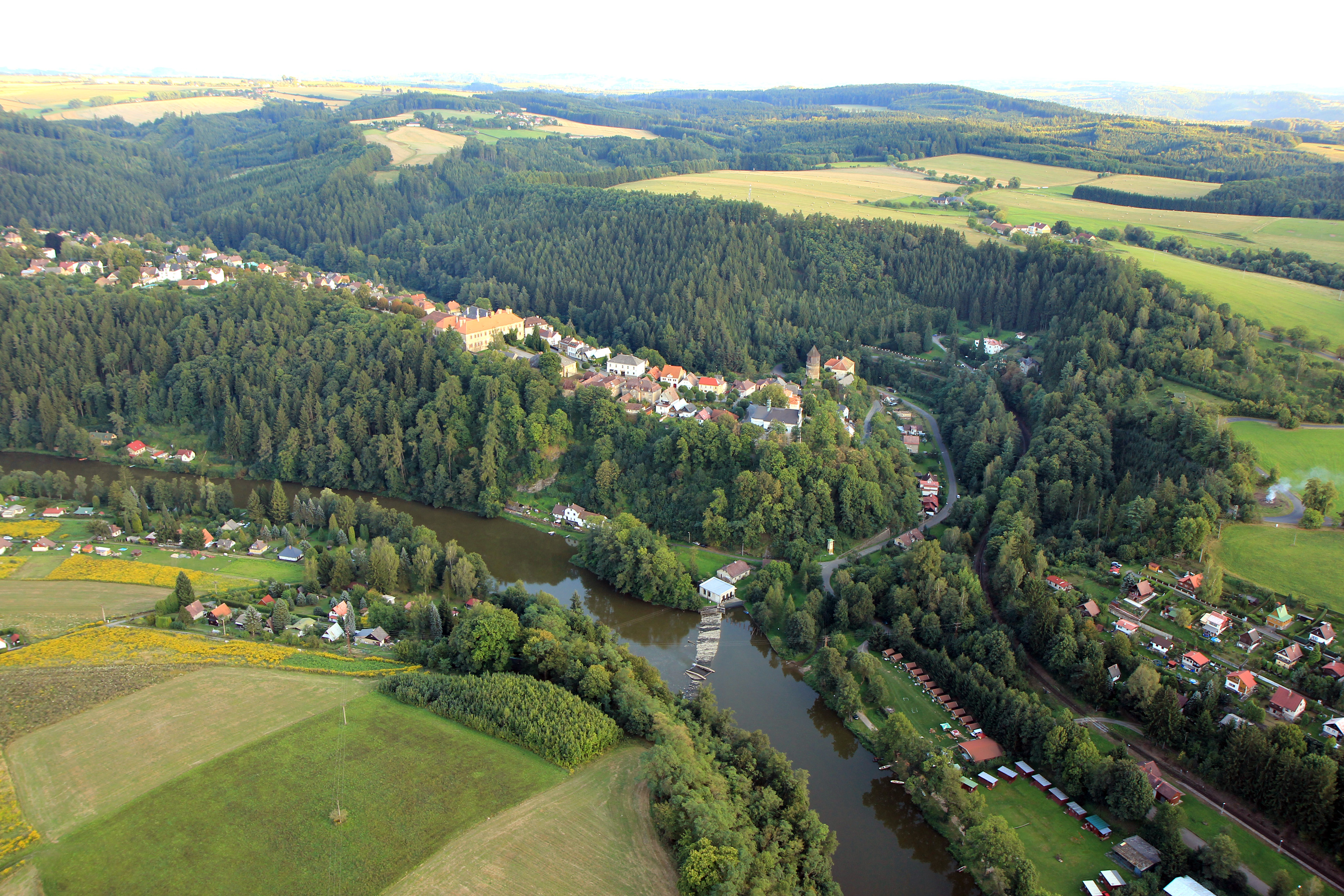
Modern-day aerial view of Rataje nad Sázavou and the Pirkštejn Castle which are situated approximately 3 km (1.9 mi) south of the Talmberk Castle, seat of the House of Talmberk, both of which are a template for the game's open world

=== Setting ===
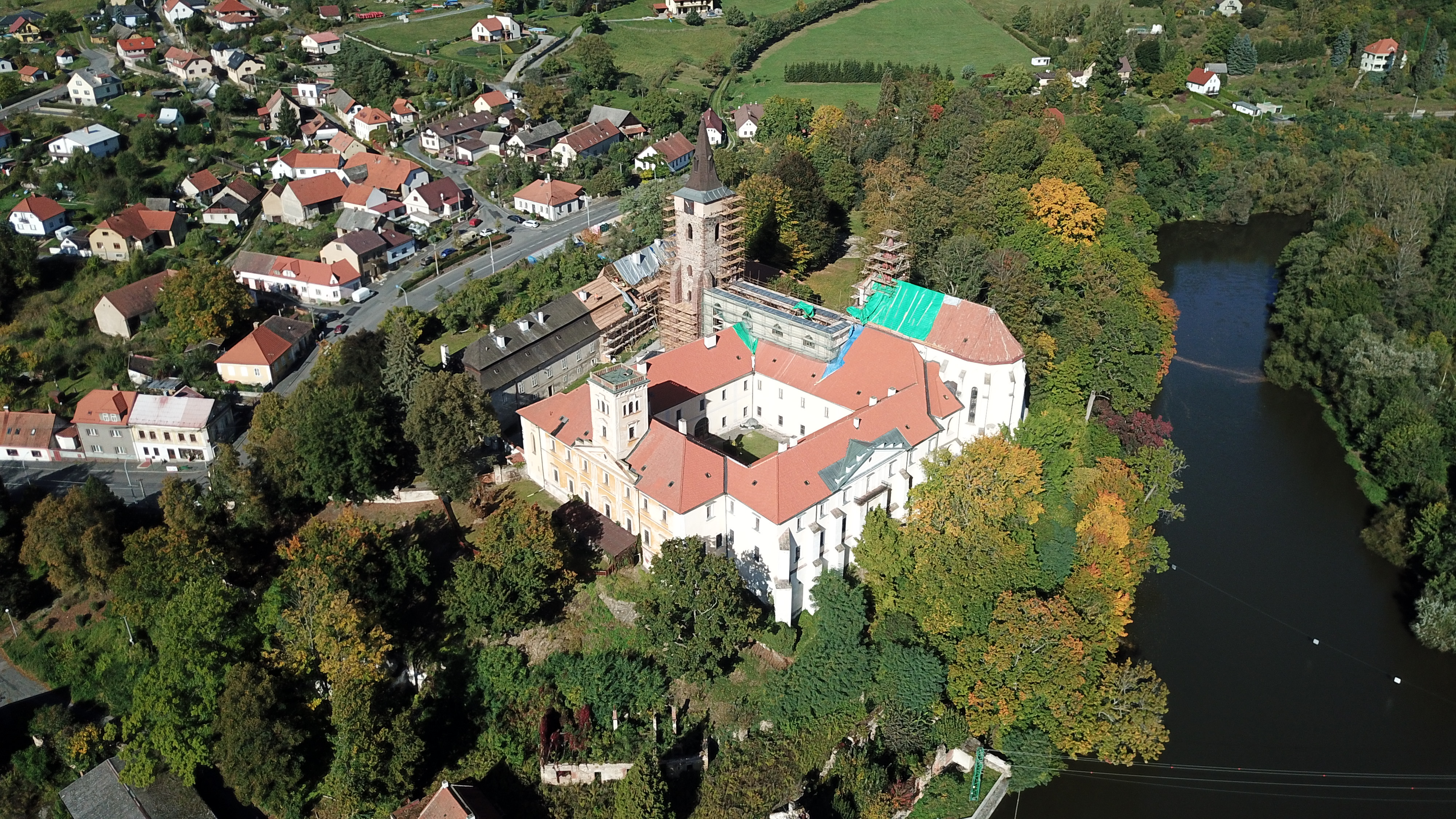
Aerial view of Sázava Monastery

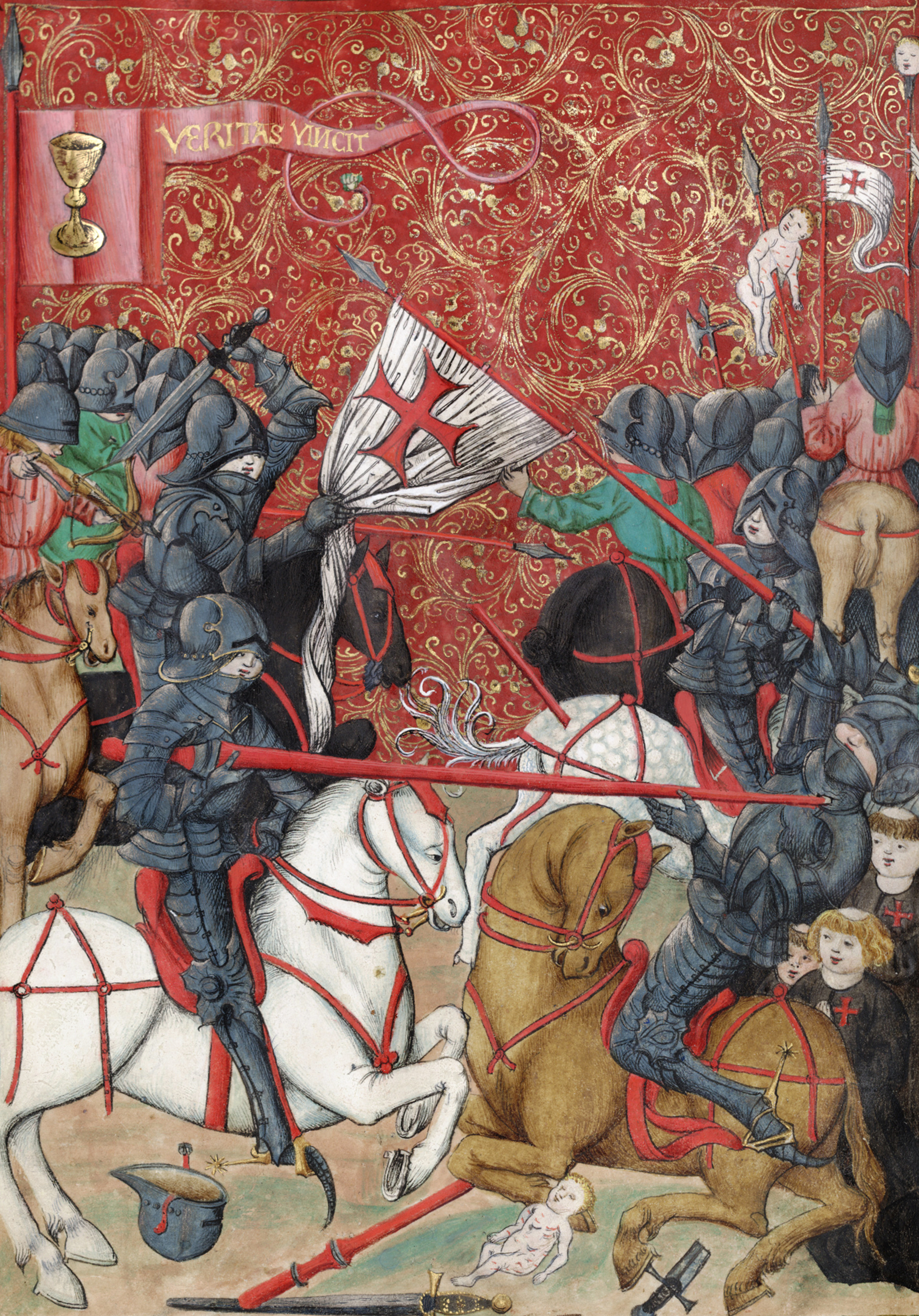
A 15th-century battle in the Kingdom of Bohemia during the reign of Sigismund, Holy Roman Emperor, who is featured in the game

Kingdom Come: Deliverance takes place in the early 15th century in the Kingdom of Bohemia, then part of the Lands of the Bohemian Crown and of the Holy Roman Empire, in what is now the Czech Republic. The accessible area of the game is located in the region between Sázava (Sasau) and Rattay. Other real-world settlements and towns in the game include Ledečko, Mrchojedy, Přibyslavice, Samopše, Sázava Monastery, Stříbrná Skalice, Talmberk, Úžice, and Vraník.

Before the events of the game, the Kingdom of Bohemia was ruled by Charles IV, who was also Holy Roman Emperor, and it experienced a golden age under his reign. Upon Charles' death in 1378, his eldest son, Wenceslaus IV, would inherit his father's throne. Wenceslaus would prove himself an idle and frivolous ruler, and a nuisance to the Bohemian nobility. After Wenceslaus did not seek a coronation ceremony as emperor, the nobles turned to his half-brother Sigismund, King of Hungary and Croatia, for help. Sigismund thus kidnapped Wenceslaus to force his abdication, and took advantage of the ensuing disorder with a brutal campaign to pillage the Bohemian lands and punish Wenceslaus' allies.

=== Characters ===
Many of the game's characters are based on historical people, though the protagonist Henry of Skalitz (Tom McKay) is fictional. Henry's companion is the heir to Rattay, Hans Capon of Pirkstein (Luke Dale). Other notable characters are the Hungarian nobleman and main antagonist Istvan Toth (Logan Hillier), liege lord of Skalitz: Radzig Kobyla (Michael Pitthan), Henry's primary love interest mill maid Theresa (Victoria Lynn Carroll), Henry's foster-father Martin (Matthew Wolf), acting lord of Rattay: Hanush of Leipa (Peter Hosking, Daniel Vávra), bandit gang leader Runt (Luke Allen-Gale), the noble Jobst of Moravia (Marc Cram), the German knight Markvart von Aulitz (Richard Zeman), and chief engineer of Skalitz: Tobias Feyfar (Ben Bradshaw).

=== Plot ===
In the silver mining town of Skalitz, Henry is a young apprentice living with his mother and his blacksmith father, Martin. Henry and Martin finish a commissioned sword for King Wenceslaus' hetman, Sir Radzig Kobyla, who visits to admire the weapon with Hungarian nobleman Sir Ištván Tóth. Skalitz is then attacked by an army of Cuman soldiers under Sigismund's command, and Henry's parents are killed by Sigismund's adjutant, German nobleman Sir Markvart von Aulitz. Henry flees with the sword to Talmberg to warn its lord, Sir Divish, of the attack. Taking advantage of a storm during the night, Radzig sneaks the survivors out of Skalitz castle and towards Rattay.

The next morning, Sigismund's army appears outside of Talmberg, but Divish parlays with Markvart and convinces Sigismund to leave. Meanwhile, Henry is devastated that his parents have not been properly buried, and sneaks back to Skalitz against Divish's orders. Henry is then confronted by bandits led by a man named Runt, who defeats Henry in a duel and steals the commissioned sword. Henry is saved by another Skalitz survivor, Theresa, and Talmberg's Captain Robard and his guard, who take him to Rattay to be harboured by Peshek, the local miller and Theresa's uncle.

Seeking to recover his father's sword and avenge his parents, Henry enters the service of Sir Hanush of Leipa, acting Lord of Rattay and guardian to his young nephew, Lord Hans Capon. After saving Capon from Cumans during a hunting trip, Henry becomes Radzig's envoy. Henry then helps investigate a bandit raid on a local stud farm in Neuhof, which leads him to a concealed camp in Pribyslavitz sheltering bandits and Cumans, Runt being among them. Henry helps Radzig's and Divish's soldiers overwhelm the camp and kills Runt after a duel, but fails to locate his father's sword.

The camp leads the Lords to believe that someone is secretly raising an insurgency. Henry follows various leads to discover a group of bandits operating near Sasau, who are recruiting mercenaries with counterfeit coins. Henry unravels the conspiracy and infiltrates the bandit ranks, leading him to their stronghold in Vraník. He encounters Tóth again, who recognises Henry and has him captured and tortured. Tóth reveals that he wields Henry's father's sword and plans to use his mercenaries to conquer Bohemia, expecting Sigismund to reward him once he reigns as king. He also reveals that Henry is actually Radzig's illegitimate son. With the help of a former Skalitz villager, Zbyshek, Henry escapes and warns the Lords of Tóth's treachery. Radzig acknowledges Henry as his son, and then the Lords and their combined army assault Vranik and defeat its garrison. However, Tóth and a number of his mercenaries infiltrate Talmberg and capture its castle, taking Divish's wife Stephanie and Sir Radzig as hostages.

The Lords lay siege to Talmberg, and Konrad Kyeser is recruited to help build a trebuchet, which the Lords use to breach the castle's walls. The Lords and their soldiers overwhelm Tóth's men, and Hanush negotiates the release of the hostages in exchange for Tóth's safe departure. Henry is angered at Tóth's escape with the sword, while Radzig believes that they will encounter him again. Radzig also reveals that he and Henry's mother were lovers when they were young, but Radzig could not marry a commoner, which was why he allowed Martin to be Henry's father.

In the epilogue, Martin visits Henry in a dream, who commends Henry for his courage and perseverance before walking away with Henry's mother into the afterlife. Henry and the Lords are then visited by Jobst of Moravia, King Wenceslaus' cousin, who has negotiated an alliance with various nobles throughout the empire against Sigismund. Seeing the futility of the war, Jobst wishes to have the Bohemian Lords join so that they can sway Sigismund's supporters to sue for peace. The Lords are uncertain, but agree that Wenceslaus must be restored to the throne. To assess the situation, Henry and Capon must visit one of Sigismund's allies, Otto von Bergow, at his estate in Trosky Castle, with a letter enquiring whether or not his allegiance to Sigismund has been shaken. The pair depart the region with a small armed entourage.

== Development and release ==
The project that was to become Kingdom Come: Deliverance began with a pitch by Daniel Vávra, who had left 2K Czech in 2009. With a small team he began seeking investors for the project. Vávra's pitch brought on board Martin Klíma, founder of Altar Games, but pitches to major investors in the Czech Republic were not successful. The team was preparing to abandon the project when a successful pitch to a private investor, the Czech billionaire Zdeněk Bakala, secured funding to develop a prototype of the game. Warhorse Studios was founded on 21 July 2011.

Warhorse Studios first announced that they were working on an "unannounced role-playing game" on 9 February 2012, having successfully licensed CryEngine 3 on this date. After seventeen months working on the prototype, Warhorse began a tour pitching the prototype to various international investors. The project did not generate the hype they had hoped for and, with dwindling resources, little progress was made towards an investment.

On 22 January 2014, Warhorse Studios launched a crowdfunding campaign via Kickstarter with the goal of generating £300,000, ten percent of the US$5,000,000 budget, in order to prove to investors that there was an audience and desire for the game. By 20 February, the effort had raised a total of £1,106,371. Even after the end of the Kickstarter campaign, crowdfunding was continued through the studio's website. On 1 October 2014, Daniel Vávra announced through a YouTube video that the game had raised US$2,002,547 from a total of 38,784 backers. The date of the public alpha access launch was on 22 October 2014. The beta was released for backers on 3 March 2015. On 29 September 2016, it was announced that Warhorse Studios had signed a deal with Koch Media's game publishing division Deep Silver to publish the console versions as well as the retail PC version. The game's adaptive music soundtrack was composed by Jan Valta and Adam Sporka, and its parts were recorded with a symphonic orchestra in Rudolfinum. Support for Linux was mentioned on the Kickstarter, but was later cancelled.

The game was released worldwide on 13 February 2018. A day-one patch was released with an extensive update of the game code and gameplay. The game reportedly cost 750 million crowns, approximately US$36.5 million, including marketing costs.

On 27 May 2018, the developers revealed a DLC roadmap. From the Ashes is the first story DLC and grants the player control over an abandoned village that needs to be rebuilt. Two more story DLCs—The Amorous Adventures of Bold Sir Hans Capon and Band of Bastards—were released before the end of 2018. Other new content includes combat tournaments, a "making of" documentary, and "Combat Academy" videos. The fourth and final story DLC, A Woman's Lot, arrived in early 2019. A Woman's Lot is a free expansion for early crowdfunding supporters. A "Royal Edition", which includes the base game and all additional content, was released in June 2019. Modding support was released in late October 2019, with Warhorse Studios saying "it is the last thing we want to release for Kingdom Come Deliverance." The modding tools are available for free on PC.

On 10 June 2021, it was announced that Warhorse Studios would be collaborating with Saber Interactive to develop a port for the Nintendo Switch, which released on 15 March 2024.

=== Tie-in media ===
A live-action adaptation of Kingdom Come was announced in October 2020, from Erik Barmack and Warhorse Studios.

A comic book prequel to Kingdom Come: Deliverance was produced by Sumerian Comics and released in 2022 as a four-issue series. It was later collected as a graphic novel and released in March 2023.

== Reception ==
Reception

Aggregate score
Aggregator	Score
Metacritic	(PC) 76/100 (PS4) 69/100 (XONE) 68/100 (NS) 69/100

Review scores
Publication	Score
Computer Games Magazine	8/10
Destructoid	7.5/10
Electronic Gaming Monthly	3.5/10
Game Informer	5.75/10
GameRevolution	4.5/5
GameSpot	8/10
GameStar	77/100
Hardcore Gamer	3.5/5
HobbyConsolas	82/100
IGN	8/10
Official Xbox Magazine (UK)	70/100
PC Gamer (UK)	84/100
Push Square	7/10
RPGFan	75/100
Shacknews	7/10
The Guardian	3/5

Kingdom Come: Deliverance received "mixed or average" reviews from critics for the PS4 and Xbox One versions, while the PC version received "generally favorable" reviews, according to review aggregator website Metacritic.

GameRevolution described the game as "if you stripped Skyrim of the fantastical creatures and magic", and concluded that "it made for good enough of an experience to warrant enduring the game's bugs and shortfalls." GameSpot identified the game's attention to small detail as both a positive and negative point in the game, praising the "Incredible attention to historical detail" and "Extensive, lifelike quests", but criticising that "Overly rigorous core mechanics can get in the way of your enjoyment". IGN praised the game for its story, characters, and combat system, while criticising its lack of technical polish. On the other hand, Dimitry Halley's review for GameStar criticised the game's villains as one-dimensional. Digitally Downloaded appreciated the game's attention to detail but criticised the "juvenile" tone the game takes in some of its traits, such as "manly odor" being a stat booster, receiving a stat boost by visiting a brothel, or needing to consume alcoholic drinks in order to save progress. HobbyConsolas described Kingdom Come: Deliverance as "one of the most immersive and ambitious RPGs in recent years". Hardcore Gamer praised the game's visuals, calling them "painstakingly crafted here in visuals alone [...] structurally and aesthetically". In a similar respect, the Official Xbox Magazine said, "A huge action RPG that is bursting with love and detail", though highlighted the game's bugs. Andy Kelly for PC Gamer and Alice Bell of VideoGamer.com criticised the game's numerous technical issues.

EGM criticised the game's difficult-to-use save system, long loading times, and frequency of software bugs, complaining that they had logged 30 hours of real-time play, but only 19 hours had been spent advancing the game. They summarised that "What could have been an intriguing, unique, if somewhat underwhelming RPG is completely crippled by a terrible save system and game-breaking bugs." Push Square's Glen Fox panned the game's loading times as "ridiculously lengthy". Game Informer similarly criticised the save system and software bugs, concluding that the game was only worth buying for those interested in the setting and focus on realism. Shacknews's Charles Singletary Jr panned the game's technical issues as "repeatedly stifl[ing]" the game. Dave Yeager in his review for RPGFan criticised the save system and the combat as being "brutal for casual types".

Kat Bailey of USgamer thought that the game's commitment to "realism", including hunger and sleep meters and the restrictive save system, was "contrived" and got in the way of fun and immersion. She felt she "was piloting Henry as if he were a robot, constantly monitoring his vitals so that he didn't suddenly keel over dead". Charlie Hall of Polygon similarly found the realism to be overplayed, complaining that despite plenty of people populating the world, only a small fraction were interactable. Robert Purchese of Eurogamer pointed to the cumbersome inventory management system as another weakpoint borne of realism.

Outlets such as Kotaku noted that there seemed to be more glitches and software bugs on the Xbox version of the game, and that the update patches were solving fewer of the errors than they were on other platforms.

=== Historical accuracy ===
Although historians commended the game for aiming for historical accuracy, some commentators have criticised the developers' portrayal of 15th-century Central Europe, while scholars criticised the simplistic portrayal of Cumans and Hungarians as cruel invaders. The developers responded by saying that the game was historically accurate and that people of colour did not inhabit early 15th-century Bohemia in significant numbers. One researcher attempted to evaluate the game's historical accuracy with respect to medieval life. He found that many aspects of material reality, including melee weapons, armor, and food, were accurate to medieval sources. However, he noted that the lack of crossbows and firearms was anachronistic, and that the Cumans would not have been Hungarian-speaking "barbaric" nomads with outdated gear as they are depicted in the game.

Reid McCarter, a writer for Unwinnable, indicted the game for its policing of cultural borders. He felt that the Cumans and Hungarians were unfairly portrayed as cruel invaders, while the Czechs were shown only in a positive light. Further, Sigismund was treated as Hungarian, despite being as Bohemian as his half-brother Wenceslaus IV. He believed that "[the game's] vision of 15th-century Bohemia suggests a continuity of history that says the Czech Republic is for ethnically Czech citizens only", which was "especially unsettling in the context of the recent re-election of anti-immigrant, anti-European Union President Milos Zeman, the country's reluctance to accept Muslim refugees, and the rise of populist nationalism". Andreas Inderwildi of Rock Paper Shotgun was puzzled by the lack of ideological diversity across the different economic classes in the game. Jan Hus was depicted as unpopular among both peasants and nobles, despite being the flashpoint for the Hussite Wars in 1419, a series of civil wars which pitted peasant revolutionaries against nobles who supported the Catholic Church. He felt that the game's idyllic version of Bohemia did not accurately reflect the "powder keg" of ideological tension that would soon break out into war just a few years later.

Scholars investigated the developers' claims about the game's historical authenticity. Martin Bostal, a medieval archaeologist at University of Caen Normandy, drew parallels between the developers' attempt at historical authenticity and the work of historical reenactment. Both involve reconstruction of history based on interpretation of sources but are limited by the level of detail that exists in those sources. Bostal observed that although the game successfully stripped away elements of fantasy, it still retained its status as chivalric romance, full of adventure, violence, and romance that would be unrealistic for a peasant of that age. He also acknowledged the controversy surrounding the game's lack of people of colour, pointing to evidence of Moors in the region, but did conclude it was historically logical, due to the size of the game's open world. Helen Young, a literature professor at Deakin University, says that when creatives strive for "historical authenticity", they naturally extend beyond proven historical fact to include "audience expectation". In the case of Kingdom Come: Deliverance, the target audience expects medieval racial purity, which leads to a product that reflects and reinforces that expectation, and rejects evidence that does not fit. She noted that the protagonist Henry's social mobility from peasant to knight would have been so rare as to be anachronistic for the time period, but fits with the modern audience's expectations of a hero's journey. In contrast, no amount of evidence of non-White peoples in Bohemia would be deemed sufficient to gain acknowledgement in the product, as it could always be dismissed as "inaccurate, poorly researched, politically motivated or too specific". Dr. James Cook argues that since Henry is the adoptive son of a blacksmith, which were "highly prized of the peasantry of the period," together with the fact that he is the illegitimate son of the feudal lord who eventually takes an interest in him, "there is just enough narrative reason for the suspension of disbelief, even if the trajectory presented is one that would have been unlikely in the extreme in the middle ages."

European media also responded to some aspects of the criticism. A commentator at the Czech newspaper Lidové noviny called the accusations "out of place" and claimed that most Europeans would respond that there were very few, if any, black people in early 15th-century Bohemia. The German magazine M! Games asked scholars at the Johannes Gutenberg University Mainz about the ethnic composition of 15th-century Bohemia. They responded that dark-skinned Turkic peoples, like Cumans, would have been present in courtly settings but their presence in rural Bohemia is not known.

Some publications have criticised the views held by the game's director Daniel Vávra, who supported GamerGate. Eurogamer criticised Vávra for wearing a shirt from the band Burzum while promoting the game at Gamescom in 2017. Vávra and Martin Klíma responded to the accusations in an interview, stating that Vávra might be a little "quick with words", apologising for anyone who felt offended.

Klára Hübnerová, a history professor at Masaryk University, gave a lecture on the historical accuracy of Kingdom Come: Deliverance in late 2018. She criticised the game for inaccurately portraying the gender roles of the time and that the villainous depiction of Cumans was based on modern stereotypes, not historical sources. She also argued that the game distorted history through the lens of national myth, which cast historical figures as characters in the mythic origin of the Czech nation, resulting in the oafish portrayal of Wenceslaus IV and the cruel Sigismund. Joanna Nowak, the historical consultant for Warhorse Studios, also gave a presentation in the same lecture series in which she disclosed that the studio's goal was to make a "historically credible" game, but compromises and manipulations needed to be made to make the game fun. She downplayed the game's commitment to historical accuracy, stating "It's a game, it's not an open-air museum, it's not a medieval simulator!" Vávra posted a 2.5-hour video response to Hübnerová's lecture on YouTube in 2020, in which he criticised the methods of contemporary historians like Hübnerová. David Francis Wagner, of Heroine magazine, criticised both sides of the conflict—Hübnerová for her failure to play the game thoroughly, which led to some inaccurate statements, and Vávra for his inability to distinguish between biased and unbiased historical sources. Wagner observed the difference between Vávra's attitude on historical accuracy in a 2015 Polygon interview, where he was more open about the changes he made for the sake of the story and gameplay, compared to his uncompromising defense of accuracy in 2020. Vávra shared his video response on his Facebook page, which resulted in abuse, harassment, and violent threats against Hübnerová, which academics compared to the behavior of members of GamerGate.

=== Sales ===
On release day, Kingdom Come: Deliverance topped the Steam top-sellers list. At the time of its release, the game reached a peak concurrent player count on Steam of 95,863 players at once, surpassing The Elder Scrolls V: Skyrim, which recorded a peak of 90,780 players.

Game director Daniel Vávra stated that the game sold 500,000 units during its first two days, of which 300,000 were on Steam. Within two weeks of release, the game had sold over 1 million units. A year after its release, the game had sold over 2 million units. In June 2020, Warhorse announced that it had sold 3 million units, as well as 1.5 million units of additional DLCs. The game had sold over 5 million units by June 2022, and over 8 million units by November 2024. The release of the successful sequel in February 2025 boosted sales of the original game and by May 2025, the game sold over 10 million units.

In Japan, the PlayStation 4 version of Kingdom Come: Deliverance sold 13,058 units within its first week on sale in Japan, which placed it at number four on the all-format sales chart.

=== Accolades ===
Before release, the game was nominated at the 2017 Game Critics Awards and Gamescom events for "Best RPG", winning the award for "Best PC Game" at the latter. In 2018, the game was also nominated for "PC Game of the Year" at the 2018 Golden Joystick Awards. The authors of the soundtrack received "Special Achievement in Multimedia Award" at the 2nd International Festival of Film Music and Multimedia Soundtrack in Poděbrady. The game was nominated at the 1st Central & Eastern European Game Awards for "Best Game" and "Technology", winning the award for "Narrative". Kingdom Come: Deliverance also received GameRevolution's Editors Choice award.

List of awards and nominations for Kingdom Come: Deliverance

Year	Award / Venue	Category	Recipient(s)	Result	Ref.
2017	Game Critics Awards	Best RPG	Kingdom Come: Deliverance	Nominated	
2017	Gamescom	Best PC Game	Kingdom Come: Deliverance	Won	
2018	Golden Joystick Awards	PC Game of the Year	Kingdom Come: Deliverance	Nominated	
2018	International Festival of Film Music and Multimedia Soundtrack Poděbrady	Special Achievement in Multimedia Award	Jan Valta and Adam Sporka	Won	
2018	Central and Eastern European Game Awards	Best Game	Kingdom Come: Deliverance	Nominated	
2018	Central and Eastern European Game Awards	Technology	Kingdom Come: Deliverance	Nominated	
2018	Central and Eastern European Game Awards	Narrative	Kingdom Come: Deliverance	Won	
2018	Gamers' Choice Awards	Fan Favorite Role Playing Game	Kingdom Come: Deliverance	Nominated	
2018	Titanium Awards	Best Role-Playing Game	Kingdom Come: Deliverance	Nominated	
2018	Australian Games Awards	RPG of the Year	Kingdom Come: Deliverance	Nominated	
2018	MundoBSO	Mejor BSO Juego o Videojuego	Jan Valta and Adam Sporka	Nominated	
2019	Player's Awards	Game of the Year	Warhorse Studios	Nominated	
2019	Player's Awards	Game Story of the Year	Warhorse Studios	Nominated	
2019	Player's Awards	RPG Game of the Year	Warhorse Studios	Won	
2019	Player's Awards	PC Game of the Year	Warhorse Studios	Won	
2019	Player's Awards	Czech-Slovak Game of the Year	Warhorse Studios	Won	
2019	Player's Awards	Game Soundtrack of the Year	Warhorse Studios	Nominated	
2019	Czech Game of the Year Awards	Developer's Award - Main Award	Warhorse Studios	Nominated	
2019	Czech Game of the Year Awards	Game Journalists Award	Warhorse Studios	Nominated	
2019	Czech Game of the Year Awards	YouTuber's Award	Warhorse Studios	Won	
2019	Czech Game of the Year Awards	Audiovisual Execution	Warhorse Studios	Nominated	
2019	Czech Game of the Year Awards	Best Game Design	Warhorse Studios	Won	
2019	Czech Game of the Year Awards	Best Technological Solution	Warhorse Studios	Won	
2020	Czech Game of the Year Awards	Czech game of the Decade	Warhorse Studios	Won	

== Sequel ==
On 18 April 2024, Warhorse Studios revealed that a sequel, Kingdom Come: Deliverance II, would be released later that year for PlayStation 5, Windows, and Xbox Series X and Series S. The sequel continues the story of Henry, while the game's open world is twice the size of the original game. The sequel was delayed until early 2025 and eventually released on 4 February 2025.

== See also ==
- Video games in the Czech Republic
