= Zalíbená =

- Village
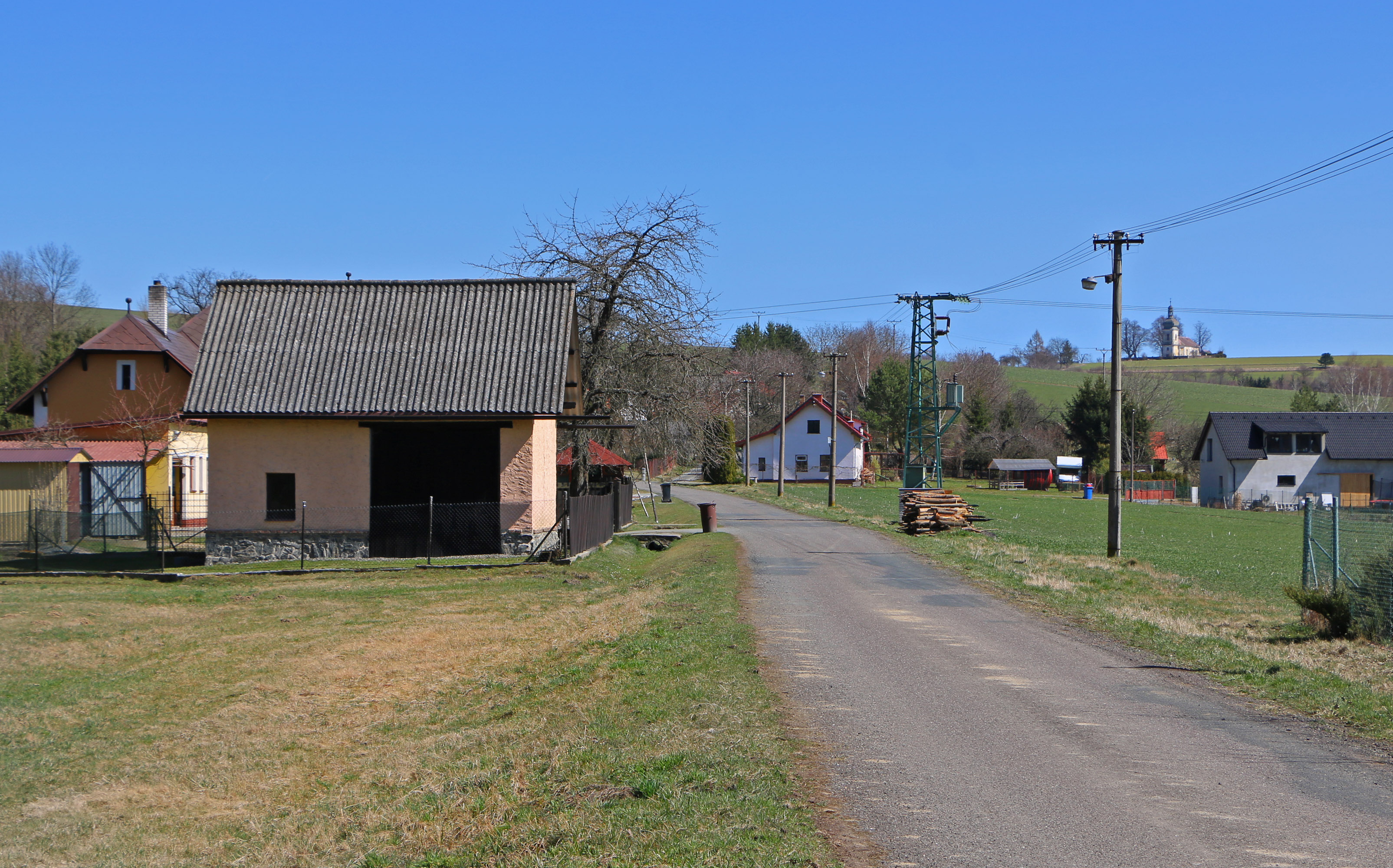
- Western part of Zalíbená

- Location in the Czech Republic
- Coordinates: 49°49′5″N 14°58′38″E
- Country: Czech Republic
- Region: Central Bohemian
- District: Kutná Hora
- Municipality: Podveky
- First mentioned: 1788

Area
  - Total: 1.68 km^{2} (0.65 sq mi)
- Elevation: 430 m (1,410 ft)

Population (2021)
  - Total: 21
  - Density: 13/km^{2} (32/sq mi)
- Time zone: UTC+1 (CET)
  - Summer (DST): UTC+2 (CEST)
- Postal code: 285 07

Zalíbená is a village and administrative part of Podveky in Kutná Hora District in the Central Bohemian Region of the Czech Republic. It has about 20 inhabitants.
