= Ladislav Štaidl =

Czech musician (1945–2021)

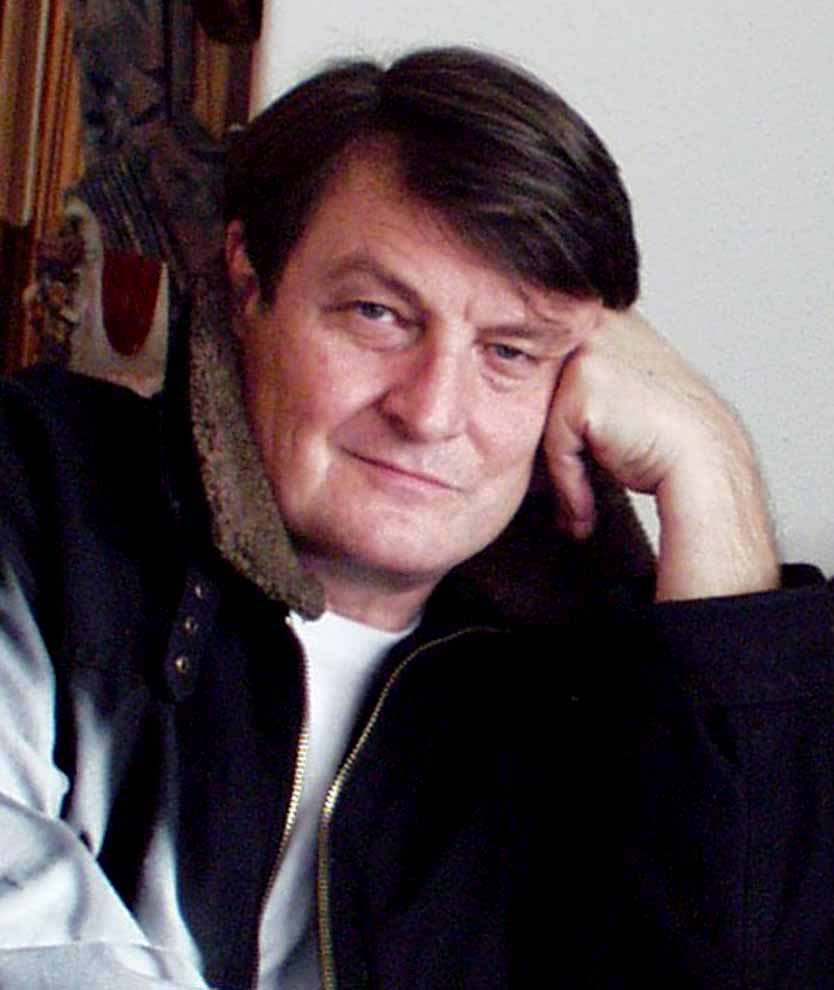
Ladislav Štaidl

Ladislav Štaidl (10 March 1945 in Stříbrná Skalice – 31 January 2021 in Prague) was a Czech musician, guitarist, pianist, conductor, bandleader, composer, lyricist, music arranger, singer, and businessman. His older, prematurely deceased brother Jiří Štaidl was also a musician and lyricist.

On 28 October 2015, President Miloš Zeman awarded him the Medal of Merit.

== Death ==
On 31 January 2021, he succumbed to complications associated with COVID-19 at the General University Hospital in Prague during the COVID-19 pandemic in the Czech Republic.
