= Vraník =

- Village
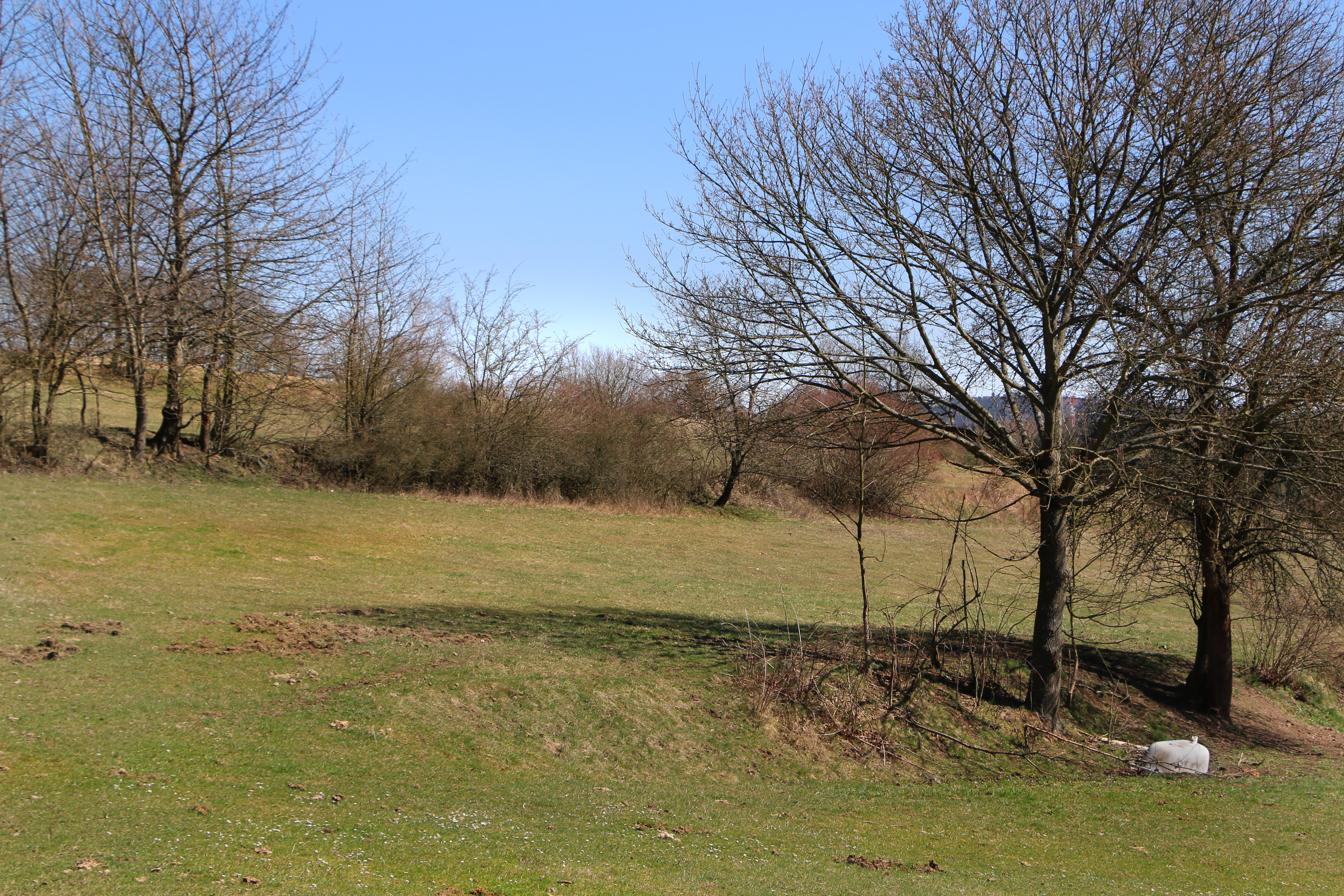
- Area of the former Vraník Gord

- Location in the Czech Republic
- Coordinates: 49°50′45″N 14°55′10″E
- Country: Czech Republic
- Region: Central Bohemian
- District: Kutná Hora
- Municipality: Ledečko
- First mentioned: 1542

Area
  - Total: 0.63 km^{2} (0.24 sq mi)
- Elevation: 400 m (1,300 ft)

Population (2021)
  - Total: 7
  - Density: 11/km^{2} (29/sq mi)
- Time zone: UTC+1 (CET)
  - Summer (DST): UTC+2 (CEST)
- Postal code: 285 06

Vraník is a village and part of Ledečko in Kutná Hora District in the Central Bohemian Region of the Czech Republic. It has about 10 inhabitants.

== Sights ==
Vraník is home to the Vraník Gord, the protected remains of a Slavic gord.

== In popular culture ==
A 15th century recreation of the village is featured in the video game Kingdom Come: Deliverance.
