= Přibyslavice (Stříbrná Skalice) =

Abandoned village in Central Bohemian Region, Czech Republic

Přibyslavice Bývalá obec Přibyslavice
- Former village
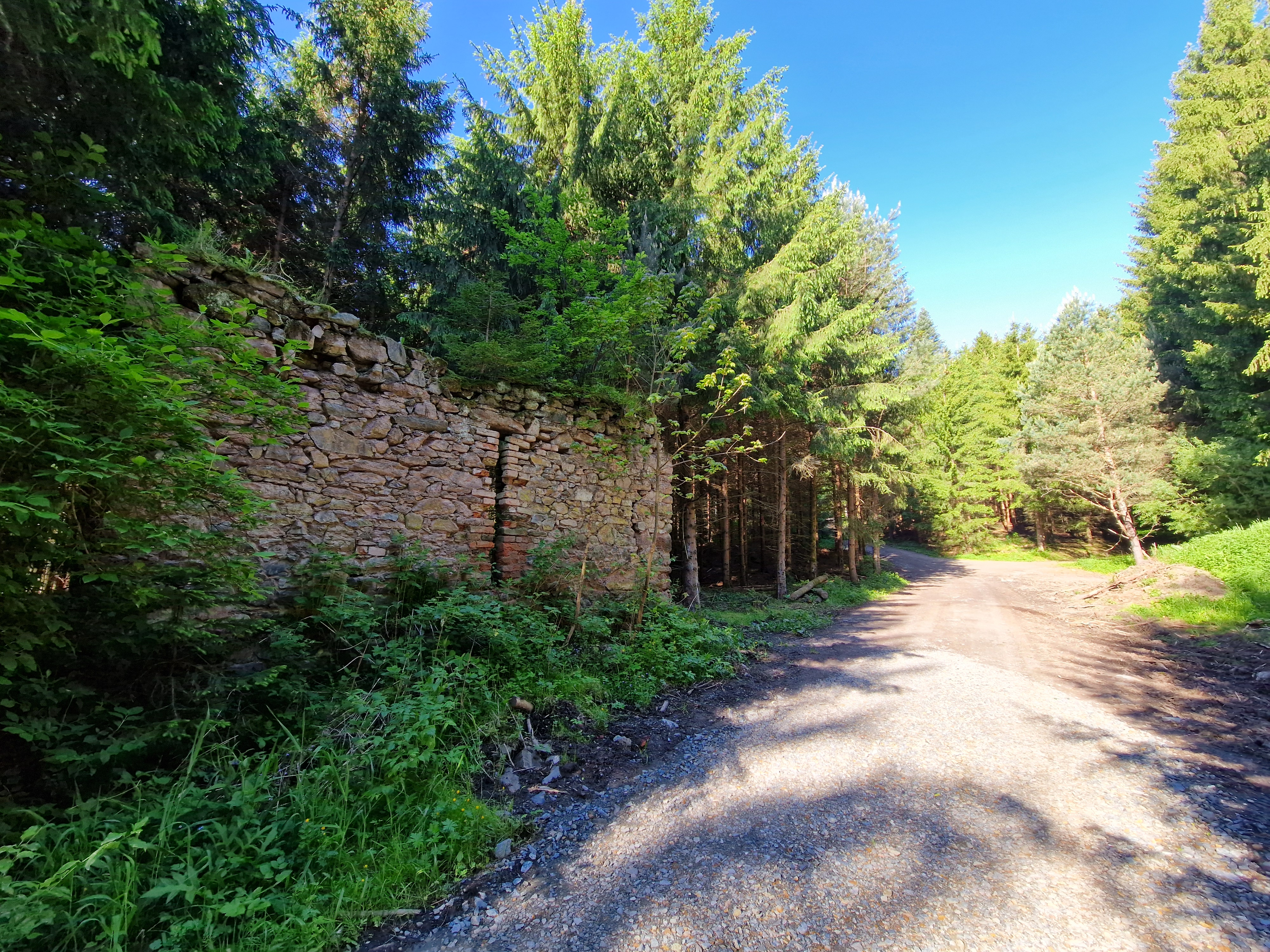
- Přibyslavice ruins, 2024

- Location in the Czech Republic
- Coordinates: 49°54′51″N 14°51′10″E
- Country: Czech Republic
- Region: Central Bohemian Region
- District: Prague-East District
- Elevation: 345 m (1,132 ft)

Přibyslavice, also known as Bývalá obec Přibyslavice (English: The former village of Přibyslavice), is a former village in the municipality of Stříbrná Skalice in the Central Bohemian Region of the Czech Republic.

== History ==
The first surviving record of the towns existence comes from the mortgage deed of Emperor Sigismund in 1436 where it is said to be under the control of the Sázava Monastery. In 1525, the village fell under ownership of the lords of Komorní Hrádek. It stayed a small and minor settlement, having only two farms by 1654. It was mentioned as being owned by the Kounice family in 1697. In 1761, the Duchess Maria Theresa of Savoy bought the Kounice estate, incorporating Přibyslavice into the municipality of Stříbrná Skalice. By the 19th century the village had been turned into a simple farmyard with two houses owned by the Buriánk family but by 1900 the family had left. In the 1920s and 1930s the village’s only inhabitants were a gamekeeper and a family of foresters. In 1932 the gamekeeper abandoned the village.

In 1945, the last person residing in the village, František Kroupa, died. The land subsequently became property of the School Forest Enterprise of Kostelec nad Černými lesy, part of the Czech University of Life Sciences Prague. As of surveys done in 2006 and 2007, only two buildings remain.

== In popular culture ==
A 15th century recreation of the village under the name Pribyslavitz features prominently in the video game Kingdom Come: Deliverance, developed by Czech studio Warhorse Studios. The village is said to have been razed by Havel Medek of Valdek thirteen years before the events of the game. The From the Ashes DLC allows the player character to become bailiff and rebuild the ruined village.
