= Benátky (Svitavy District) =

- Municipality
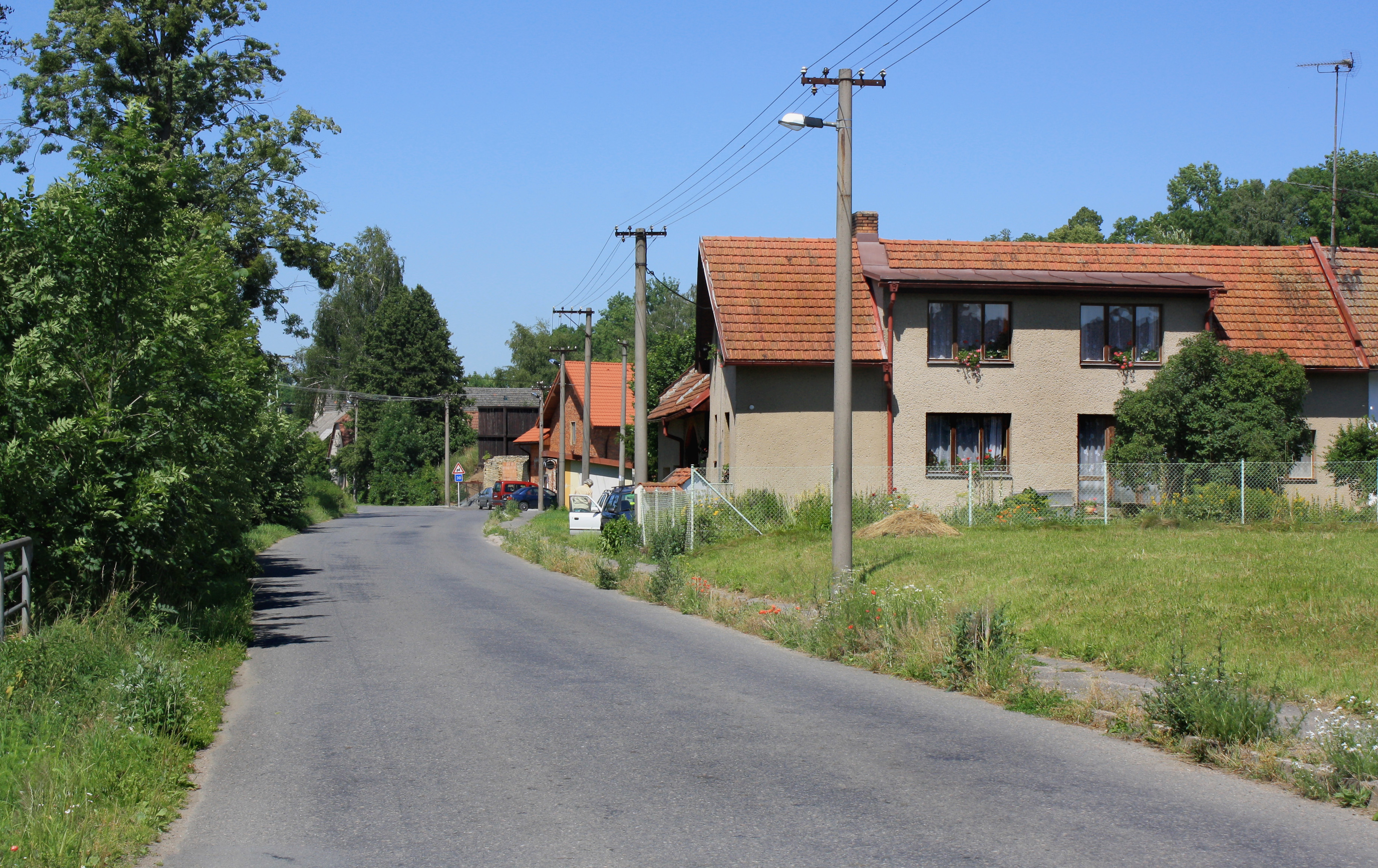
- Southern part of Benátky

- Flag Coat of arms

- Location in the Czech Republic
- Coordinates: 49°51′15″N 16°19′36″E
- Country: Czech Republic
- Region: Pardubice
- District: Svitavy
- First mentioned: 1547

Area
  - Total: 4.79 km^{2} (1.85 sq mi)
- Elevation: 350 m (1,150 ft)

Population (2026-01-01)
  - Total: 409
  - Density: 85.4/km^{2} (221/sq mi)
- Time zone: UTC+1 (CET)
  - Summer (DST): UTC+2 (CEST)
- Postal code: 570 01
- Website: www.obecbenatky.cz

Benátky is a municipality and village in Svitavy District in the Pardubice Region of the Czech Republic. It has about 400 inhabitants.

Benátky lies approximately 15 kilometres (9 mi) north-west of Svitavy, 45 km (28 mi) south-east of Pardubice, and 140 km (87 mi) east of Prague.

== Demographics ==
Historical population
Year	Pop.	±%
1869	484	—
1880	490	+1.2%
1890	507	+3.5%
1900	468	−7.7%
1910	451	−3.6%
1921	431	−4.4%
1930	456	+5.8%
1950	325	−28.7%
1961	308	−5.2%
1970	305	−1.0%
1980	288	−5.6%
1991	255	−11.5%
2001	300	+17.6%
2011	350	+16.7%
2021	374	+6.9%
Source: Censuses
