= Ledečko =

- Municipality
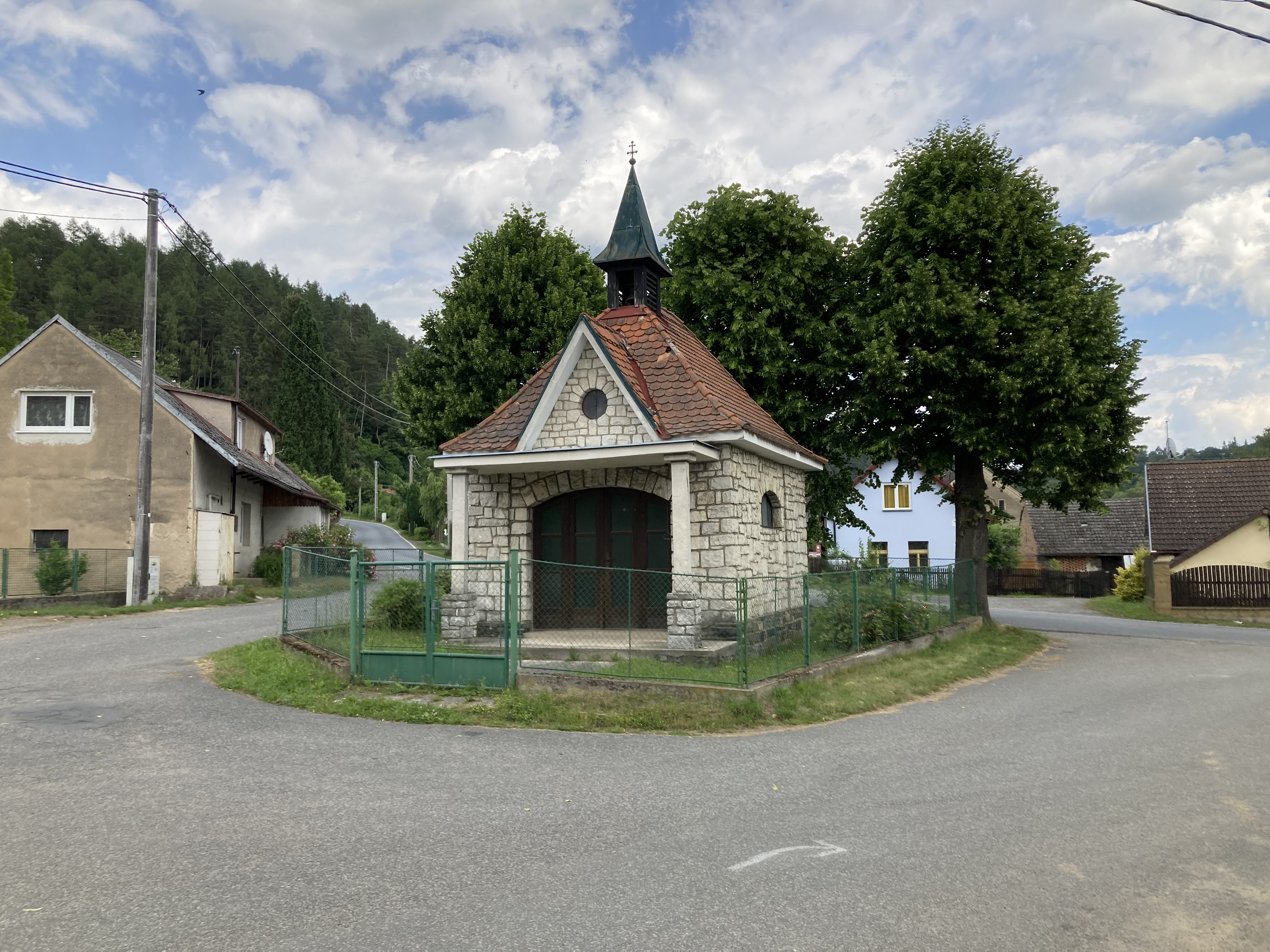
- Chapel of Saint Anne in the centre of Ledečko

- Flag Coat of arms

- Location in the Czech Republic
- Coordinates: 49°51′0″N 14°56′56″E
- Country: Czech Republic
- Region: Central Bohemian
- District: Kutná Hora
- First mentioned: 1280

Area
  - Total: 3.01 km^{2} (1.16 sq mi)
- Elevation: 303 m (994 ft)

Population (2026-01-01)
  - Total: 238
  - Density: 79.1/km^{2} (205/sq mi)
- Time zone: UTC+1 (CET)
  - Summer (DST): UTC+2 (CEST)
- Postal code: 285 06
- Website: www.obecledecko.cz

Ledečko is a municipality and village in Kutná Hora District in the Central Bohemian Region of the Czech Republic. It has about 200 inhabitants.

== Administrative division ==
Ledečko consists of two municipal parts (in brackets population according to the 2021 census):

- Ledečko (212)
- Vraník (7)

== Etymology ==
In the 13th century, the village was called Ledeč. The name was derived from the personal name Ledek, meaning "Ledek's (court)". From the 15th century, the village was called Ledecko (Ledečsko), which meant that Ledeč was abandoned and then a new village was established in its place. From the 19th century, the village was called Ledečko because people thought that the name is a diminutive of Ledeč.

== Geography ==
Ledečko is located 25 kilometres (16 mi) southwest of Kutná Hora and 37 km (23 mi) southeast of Prague. It lies in the Vlašim Uplands. The highest point is at 444 m (1,457 ft) above sea level. The Sázava River flows through the municipality.

== History ==
The first written mention of Ledečko is from 1280. During its feudal history, the village was alternately part of the Rataje and Talmberk estates.

== Demographics ==
Historical population

Year	Pop.	±%
1869	314	—
1880	317	+1.0%
1890	343	+8.2%
1900	397	+15.7%
1910	317	−20.2%

Year	Pop.	±%
1921	319	+0.6%
1930	284	−11.0%
1950	308	+8.5%
1961	341	+10.7%
1970	271	−20.5%

Year	Pop.	±%
1980	181	−33.2%
1991	141	−22.1%
2001	144	+2.1%
2011	177	+22.9%
2021	219	+23.7%

Source: Censuses

== Transport ==
Ledečko is located on the railway lines Kolín–Ledečko and Zruč nad Sázavou–Čerčany.

== Sights ==
The only protected cultural monument in the municipality are terrain remains of an early medieval Slavic gord near Vraník. The location was inhabited already in prehistoric times.

The main landmark of Ledečko is the Chapel of Saint Anne. It was built in 1940.

== In popular culture ==
A recreation of the villages of Ledečko and Vraník in 1403 was featured in Czech role-playing game Kingdom Come: Deliverance.
