= Vlkaneč =

- Municipality
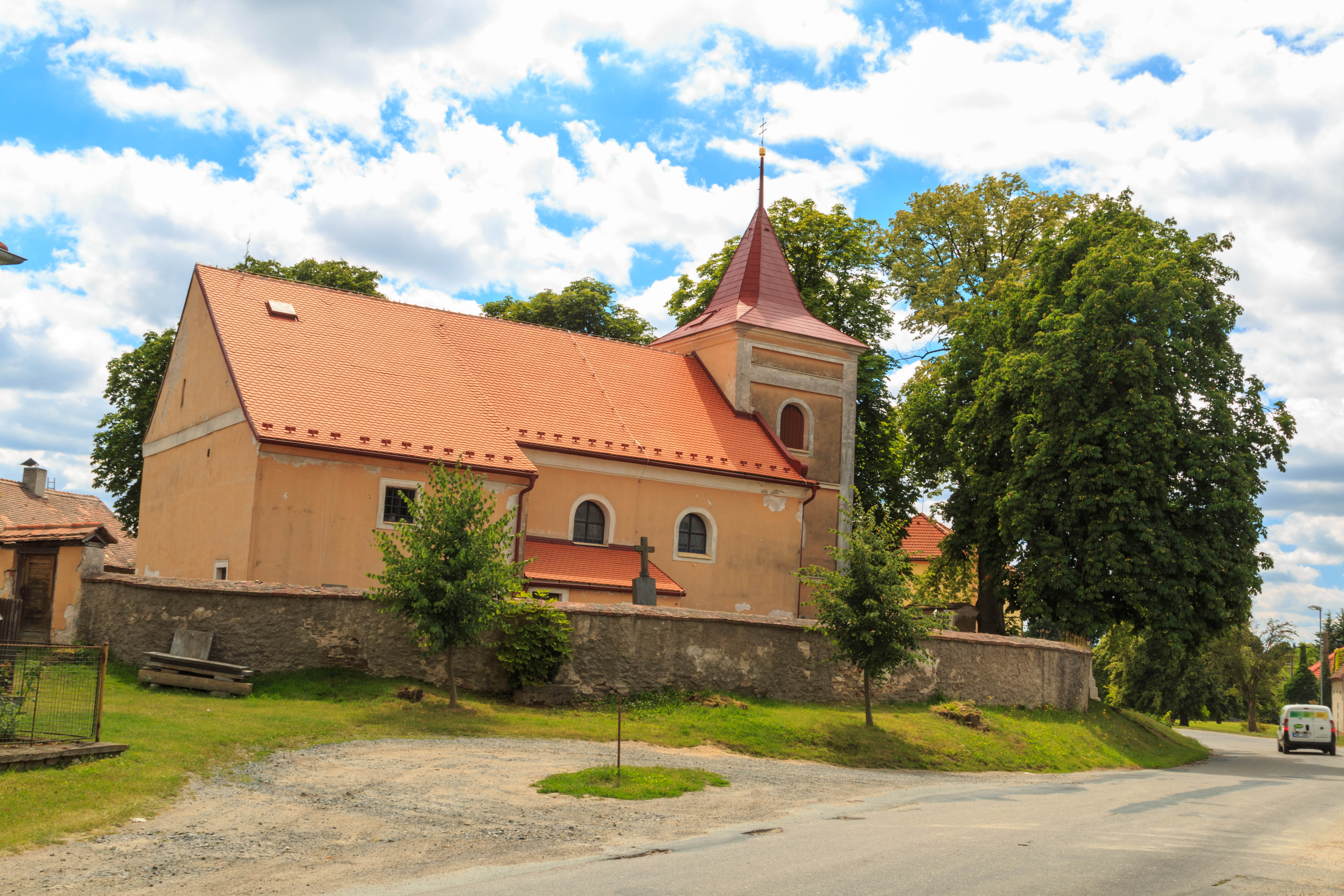
- Church of Saint James the Great

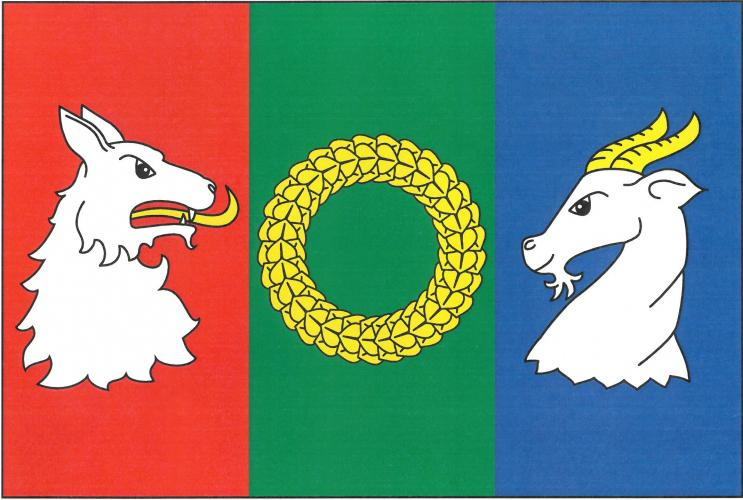
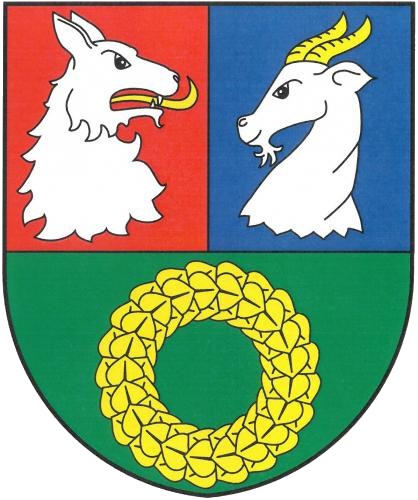
- Flag Coat of arms

- Location in the Czech Republic
- Coordinates: 49°48′23″N 15°24′11″E
- Country: Czech Republic
- Region: Central Bohemian
- District: Kutná Hora
- First mentioned: 1226

Area
  - Total: 14.14 km^{2} (5.46 sq mi)
- Elevation: 430 m (1,410 ft)

Population (2026-01-01)
  - Total: 629
  - Density: 44.5/km^{2} (115/sq mi)
- Time zone: UTC+1 (CET)
  - Summer (DST): UTC+2 (CEST)
- Postal codes: 285 64, 286 01
- Website: www.vlkanec.cz

Vlkaneč is a municipality and village in Kutná Hora District in the Central Bohemian Region of the Czech Republic. It has about 600 inhabitants.

== Administrative division ==
Vlkaneč consists of three municipal parts (in brackets population according to the 2021 census):

- Vlkaneč (391)
- Kozohlody (148)
- Přibyslavice (69)

== Demographics ==
Historical population
Year	Pop.	±%
1869	878	—
1880	892	+1.6%
1890	805	−9.8%
1900	819	+1.7%
1910	871	+6.3%
1921	898	+3.1%
1930	928	+3.3%
1950	783	−15.6%
1961	803	+2.6%
1970	755	−6.0%
1980	696	−7.8%
1991	648	−6.9%
2001	610	−5.9%
2011	576	−5.6%
2021	608	+5.6%
Source: Censuses

== Transport ==
Vlkaneč is located on the railway line Kolín–Havlíčkův Brod.
