= Úžice (Mělník District) =

- Municipality
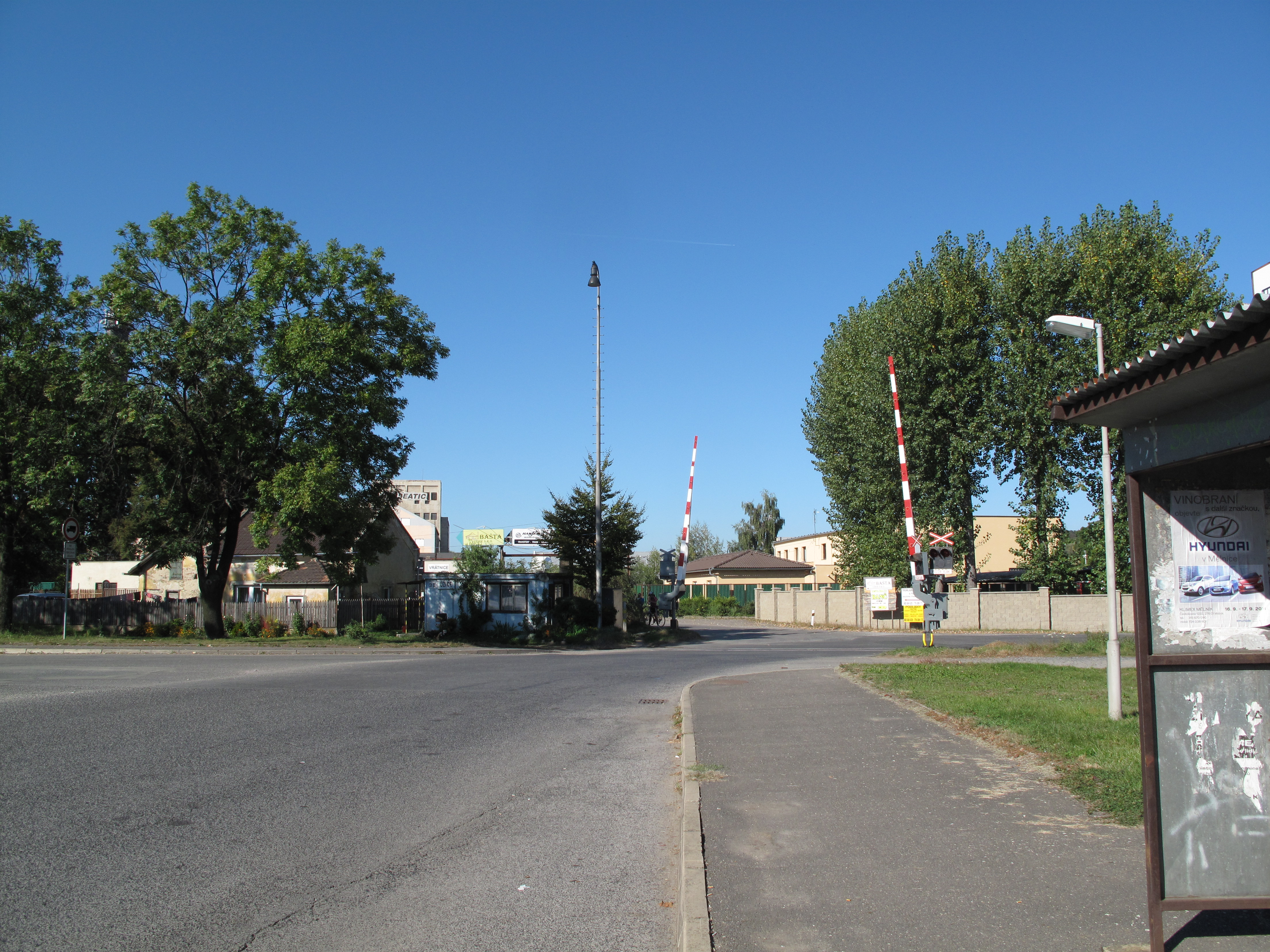
- Main street

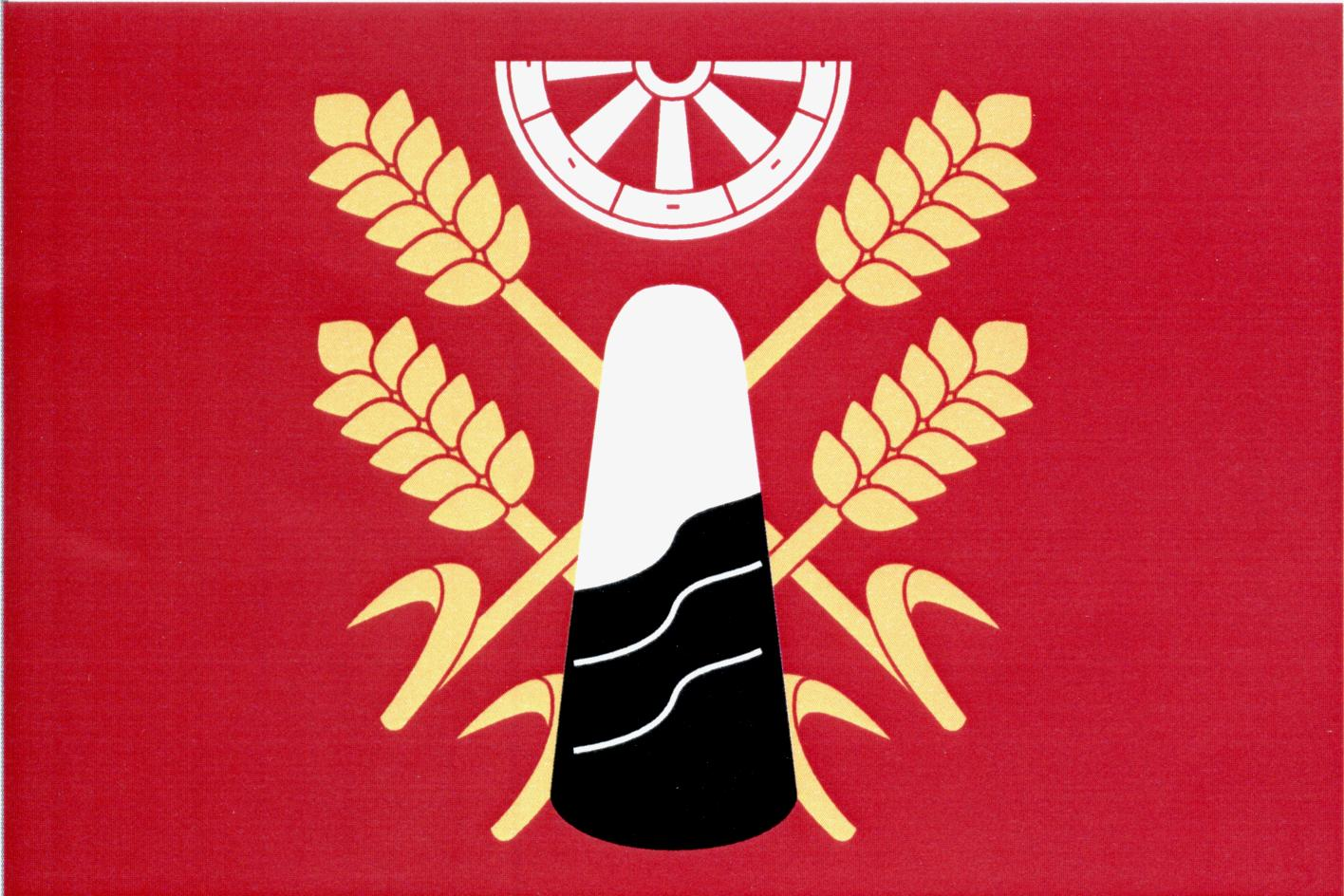
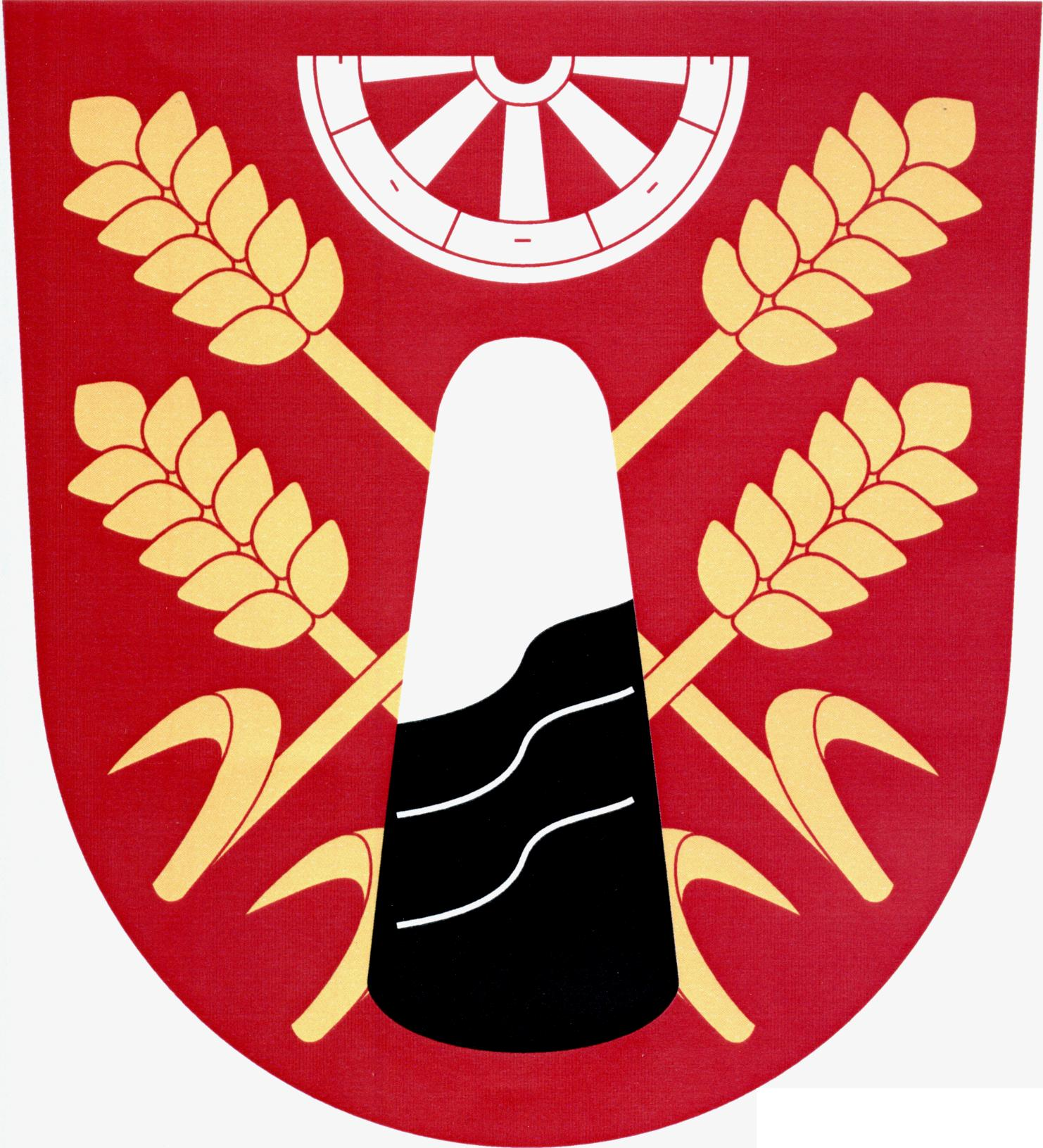
- Flag Coat of arms

- Location in the Czech Republic
- Coordinates: 50°15′11″N 14°22′44″E
- Country: Czech Republic
- Region: Central Bohemian
- District: Mělník
- First mentioned: 1405

Area
  - Total: 10.30 km^{2} (3.98 sq mi)
- Elevation: 188 m (617 ft)

Population (2026-01-01)
  - Total: 1,133
  - Density: 110.0/km^{2} (284.9/sq mi)
- Time zone: UTC+1 (CET)
  - Summer (DST): UTC+2 (CEST)
- Postal code: 277 45
- Website: www.uzice.cz

Úžice (German: Auschitz) is a municipality and village in Mělník District in the Central Bohemian Region of the Czech Republic. It has about 1,100 inhabitants.

== Administrative division ==
Úžice consists of four municipal parts (in brackets population according to the 2021 census):

- Úžice (765)
- Červená Lhota (0)
- Kopeč (75)
- Netřeba (93)

== Etymology ==
The name is derived from the personal name Úža, meaning "the village of Úža's people".

== Geography ==
Úžice is located about 13 kilometres (8 mi) southwest of Mělník and 15 km (9 mi) north of Prague. It lies in a relatively flat landscape in the Central Elbe Table. The highest point is a nameless hill at 227 m (745 ft) above sea level. The Černávka Stream flows through the municipality.

There are three small-scale protected areas in the municipal territory: Kopeč Nature Reserve (rocks with rare thermophilic plants), Dřínovská stráň Nature Monument (protected grasslands on dry marlstone slopes) and Netřebská slaniska Nature Monument (small remains of the original extensive swamps and salt marshes).

== History ==
The first written mention of Úžice is from 1405. In the 19th century, the municipality was industrialised. The local sugar factory was in operation from 1856 to 1999. The railway was opened in 1865.

== Demographics ==
Historical population

Year	Pop.	±%
1869	766	—
1880	912	+19.1%
1890	851	−6.7%
1900	966	+13.5%
1910	1,005	+4.0%

Year	Pop.	±%
1921	1,000	−0.5%
1930	1,066	+6.6%
1950	985	−7.6%
1961	1,004	+1.9%
1970	935	−6.9%

Year	Pop.	±%
1980	816	−12.7%
1991	794	−2.7%
2001	769	−3.1%
2011	940	+22.2%
2021	933	−0.7%

Source: Censuses

== Transport ==
The D8 motorway from Prague to Ústí nad Labem (part of the European route E55) runs through the municipality.

Úžice is located on the railway line Kralupy nad Vltavou–Neratovice. The municipality is served by two train stations: Úžice and Netřeba.

== Sights ==
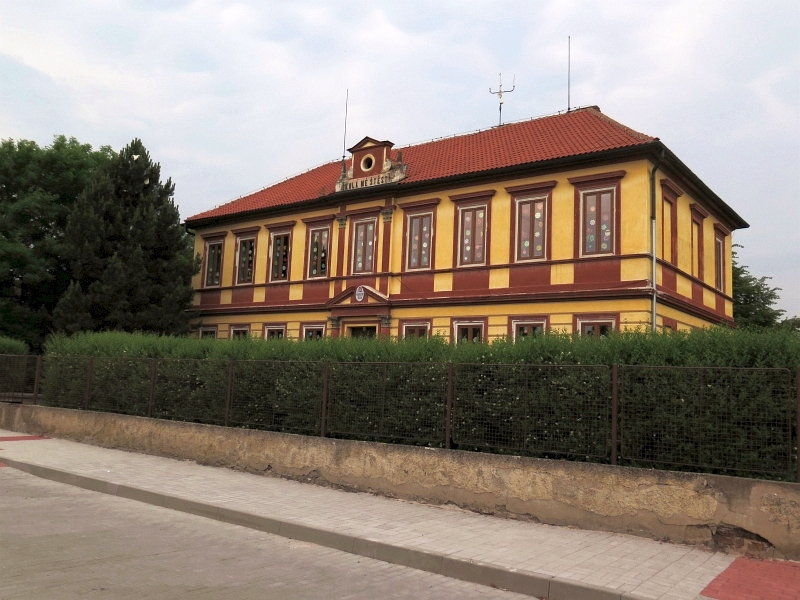
Primary school

The only protected cultural monument in the municipality is the local primary school. It is an architecturally valuable building, built in the Neo-Renaissance style in 1891–1894.

In 2022, the tallest statue of Jesus of the Czech Republic was erected in Úžice.
