= Sázava Monastery =

Former Benedictine abbey and monastery in the Czech Republic

Coordinates: 49.8761°N 14.8981°E

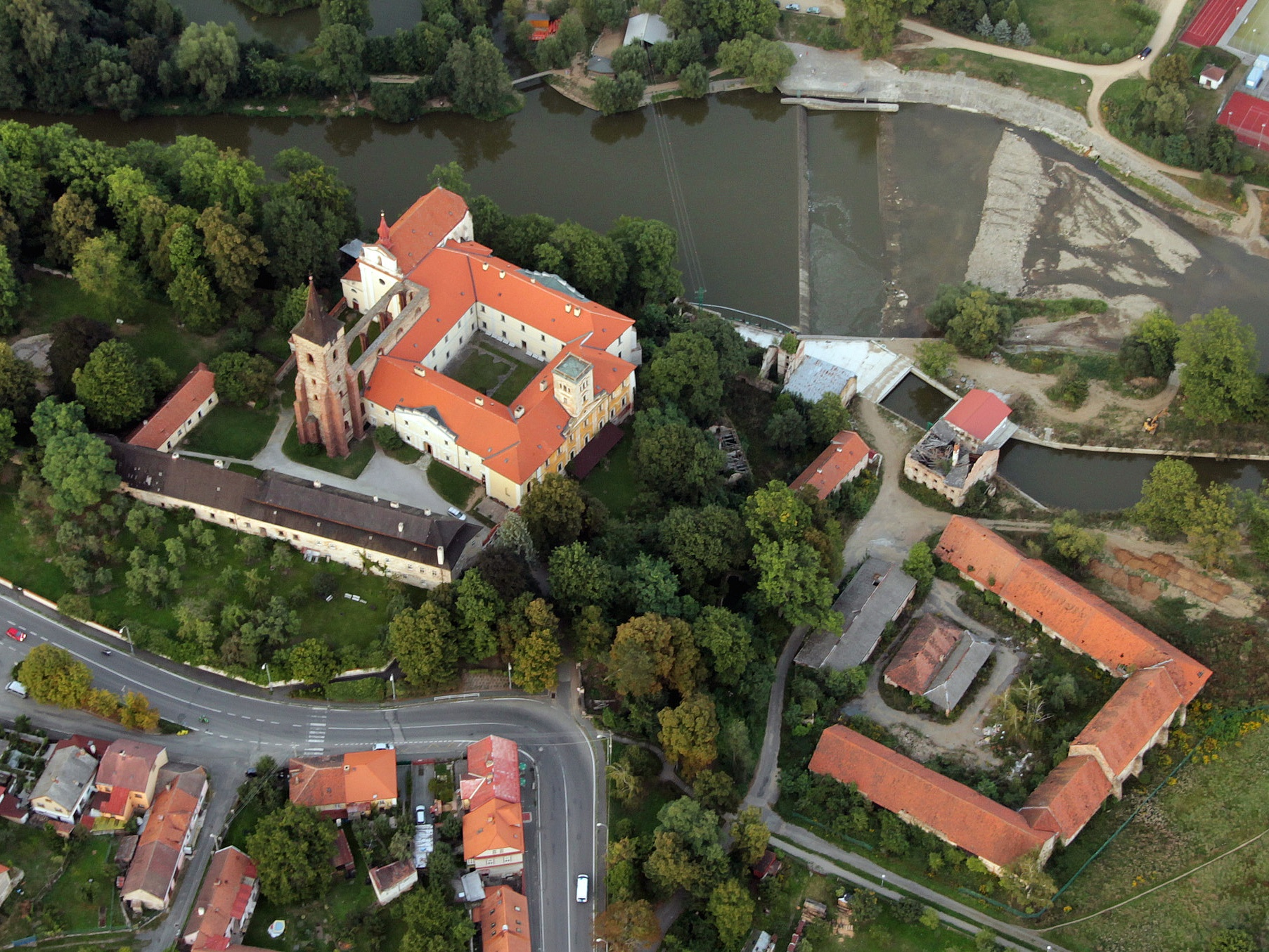
Aerial view of the monastery

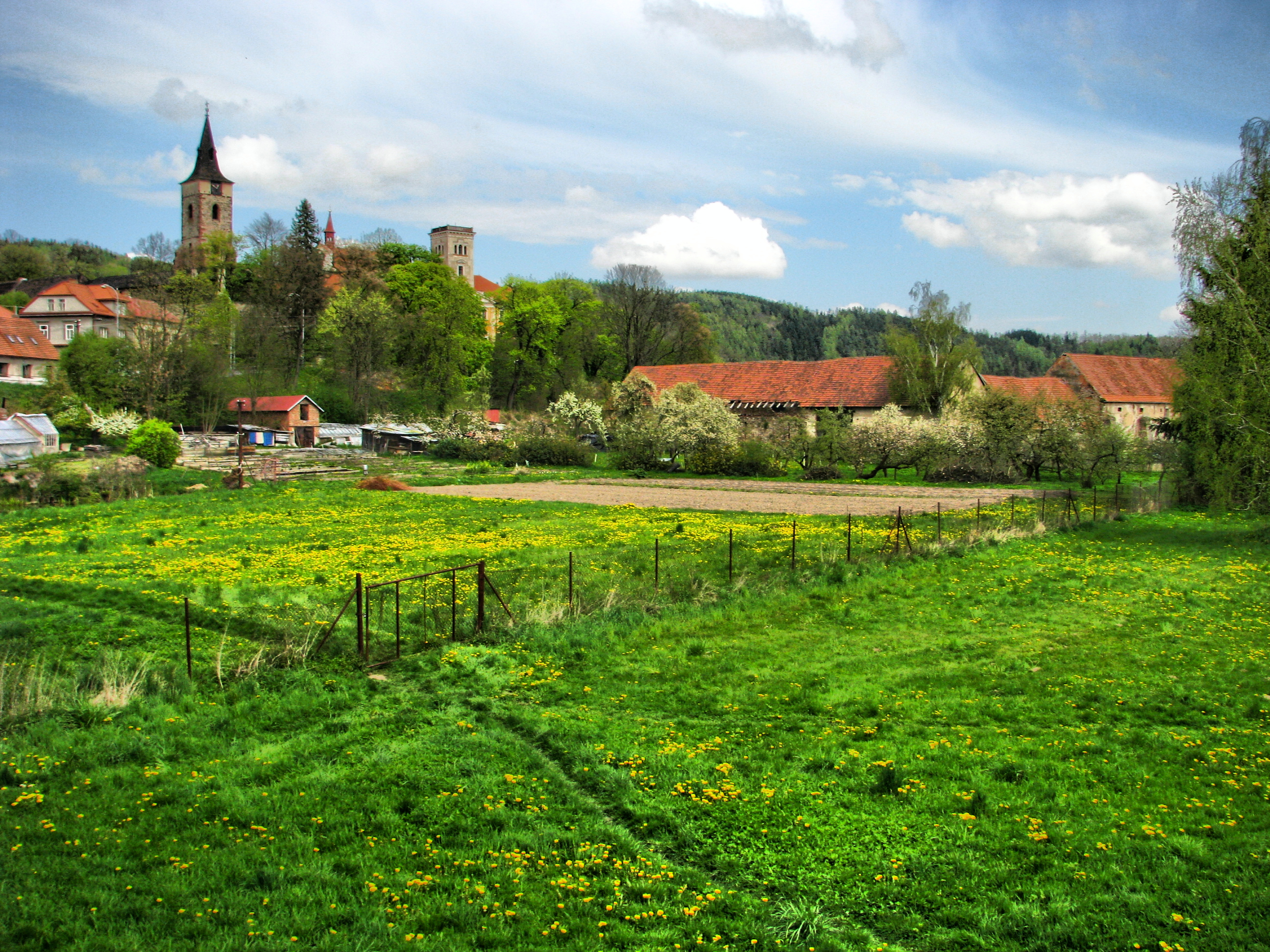
The monastery seen from the southwest

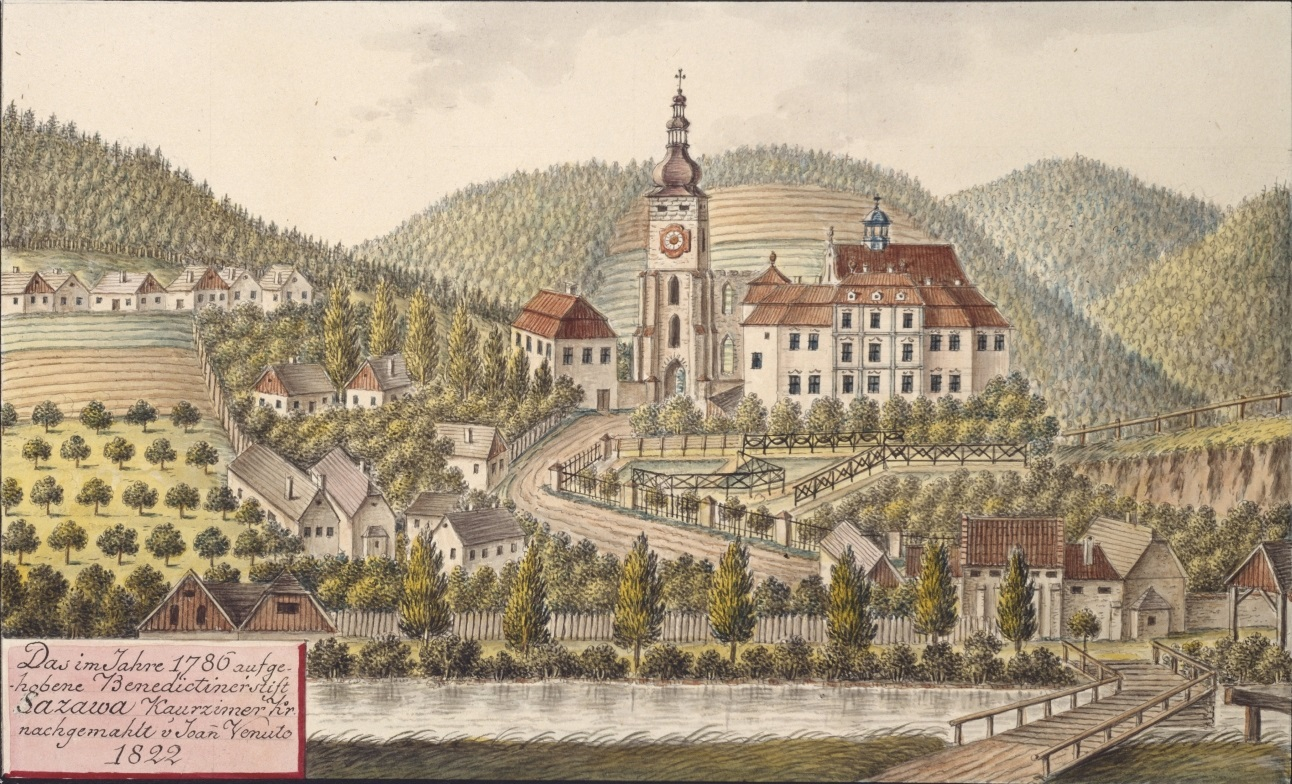
1822 depiction of the monastery

Sázava Monastery (Czech: klášter Sázava, unoficially Sázavský klášter) is a former Benedictine abbey and a monastery in the Czech Republic. it was established by Duke Bretislav I around 1032. It is situated about 30 km (19 mi) southeast of Prague, on the right bank of the eponymous Sázava river. The town of Sázava grew around the monastery.

The monastery is notable, long after its foundation by Saint Procopius of Sázava, for having followed the Byzantine Rite in the Old Church Slavonic liturgical language in the 11th century. It was forcibly transferred to the Latin rite in 1097, but remained a monastery until its destruction during the Hussite Wars in 1421.

It was again re-established as part of the re-Catholisation of Bohemia under Habsburg rule in 1664 and finally dissolved under the policy of Josephinism in 1785.

The extant buildings mostly date to the Baroque period, with 19th-century neo-Renaissance extensions, with some remaining structures in the Gothic style of the 13th to 14th centuries, notably the unfinished three-nave Gothic basilica.

== History ==
The monastery is the site of the hermitage of Procopius of Sázava (d. 1052), a hermit (canonized in 1204 by Innocent III). Procopius attracted a community of hermits, which formed the basis of the Benedictine monastery established in 1032. It is one of the oldest monasteries founded in the Duchy of Bohemia, established some 40 years after Břevnov Monastery.

In 1056, duke Spytihněv II had the monks expelled from the abbey. The monks found sanctuary in Hungary until 1061, when Duke Vratislaus II of Bohemia had them returned to the abbey. Unusually for a Benedictine abbey, Sázava was an important center of the Byzantine Rite Divine Liturgy in Old Church Slavonic (rather than Ecclesiastical Latin) until 1096. The first stone church, consecrated to the Holy Cross, was built in 1070. The ruins of this church have been excavated and are visible in the garden north of the monastery building.

In December 1096, the monks were expelled for the second time, by duke Bretislav II, marking the end of the Byzantine Rite in the Czech lands. The Byzantine Catholic monks were replaced by Latin Rite Benedictines from Břevnov Monastery under abbot Diethard (d. 1133). It was under Diethard that all Old Church Slavonic books in the monastery library were destroyed. In the 12th century, the Romanesque basilica and monastery buildings were completed. A 12th-century chronicle, De exordio Zazavensis monasterii, records the history of the monastery up to the year 1177. It also contains a continuation of Cosmas of Prague down to 1162.

The monastery's founder Procopius was formally canonized in Sázava, in the presence of Ottokar, the first hereditary king of Bohemia, on 4 July 1204.

In the later 13th to 14th centuries, the Romanesque basilica was transformed into a Gothic one, intended as a monumental three-nave structure, which however remained unfinished. The monastery buildings were also rebuilt in the Gothic style. The Madonna of Sázava is a notable 14th-century fresco in the capitular hall, unusually depicting Mary, mother of Jesus walking alongside a child Jesus aged about five years old.

Sázava was sacked by Hussite troops in 1421 and the monks were expelled, interrupting building activity. Over the following two centuries, the monastery had secular owners and fell into decay. In 1664, the monastery was again revived, bought by Seifert, abbot of the Břevnov and Broumov monasteries. The dilapidated buildings were reconstructed in the Baroque style by architect Vít Václav Kaňka.

A fire in 1746 damaged the Baroque buildings, which were restored under architect Kilian Ignaz Dientzenhofer in the late Baroque or Rococo style. The Rococo altar with a painting of the Assumption of Mary by Jan Petr Molitor and frescos of this period are extant. The monastery was finally closed down by decree of Emperor Joseph II in 1785.

The monastery estate again fell to secular owners from 1809, first to Wilhelm Tiegel of Lindenkrone, who used the cloister as a manor house, while the basilica remained in operation as a parish church. The estate was sold to Johann Friedrich Neuberg in 1869, who commissioned reconstruction work in neo-Renaissance style. The estate and the manor house were sold to Friedrich Schwarz in 1876.

Part of the estate was sold to Benedictine monks from Emmaus Monastery in 1932, who intended to re-establish the monastery in Sázava. Benedictine monk and priest Method Klement moved from Emmaus to Sázava in 1940 and began preparatory work, but the plan was interrupted by the outbreak of World War II and the subsequent communist regime. The area was managed by the National Cultural Committee of Czechoslovakia from 1951. In 1962, the area became a cultural monument, managed by the National Heritage Institute. In 1998, it became a national cultural monument. Archaeological excavations were carried out during the 1960s to 1990s by Ivan Borkovský, Petr Sommer, and others. The exhibition "Old Slavic Sázava" was opened in 1983.

As part of the reprivatization following the establishment of the Czech Republic, the property was restored to Marie Hayessová, as heiress of the Schwarz family in 2003. She sold the property to the state in 2006. Under the 2013 act on church restitution, parts of the estate were returned to the Roman Catholic parish of Černé Budy (Sázava) and parts to Emmaus Monastery. The National Heritage Institute remains in charge of restoration and conservation, focussing on the threatened pillars of the unfinished Gothic three-nave structure and on the restoration of the Baroque frescos.

== In popular culture ==
Sázava Monastery is featured in the 2018 video game Kingdom Come: Deliverance, where it is called Sasau Monastery. "The Madonna of Sasau" is the name of a story arc in the game.

== Sources ==
- Curta, Florin (2017). "Foundation of Sazava Abbey". In Curta, Florin; Holt, Andrew (eds.). Great Events in Religion: An Encyclopedia of Pivotal Events in Religious History. Vol. I. ABC-CLIO.
- Konzal, Václav (2014). "Svatý Prokop a Sázavský klášter" [Saint Procopius and Sázava Monastery]. The Cyril and Methodius Mission and Europe: 1150 Years Since the Arrival of the Thessaloniki Brothers in Great Moravia (in Czech). pp. 296–299. ISBN 978-80-86023-51-9. OS LG 2023-08-18.
- Sommer, Petr; Třeštík, Dušan; Žemlička, Josef; Opačić, Zoë (2007). "Bohemia and Moravia". In Berend, Nora (ed.). Christianization and the Rise of Christian Monarchy: Scandinavia, Central Europe and Rus', c.900-1200. Cambridge University Press. pp. 214–262. ISBN 978-0-521-87616-2.
- Wolverton, Lisa (2001). Hastening Toward Prague: Power and Society in the Medieval Czech Lands. University of Pennsylvania Press. ISBN 0-8122-3613-0.
