= Úžice (Kutná Hora District) =

- Municipality
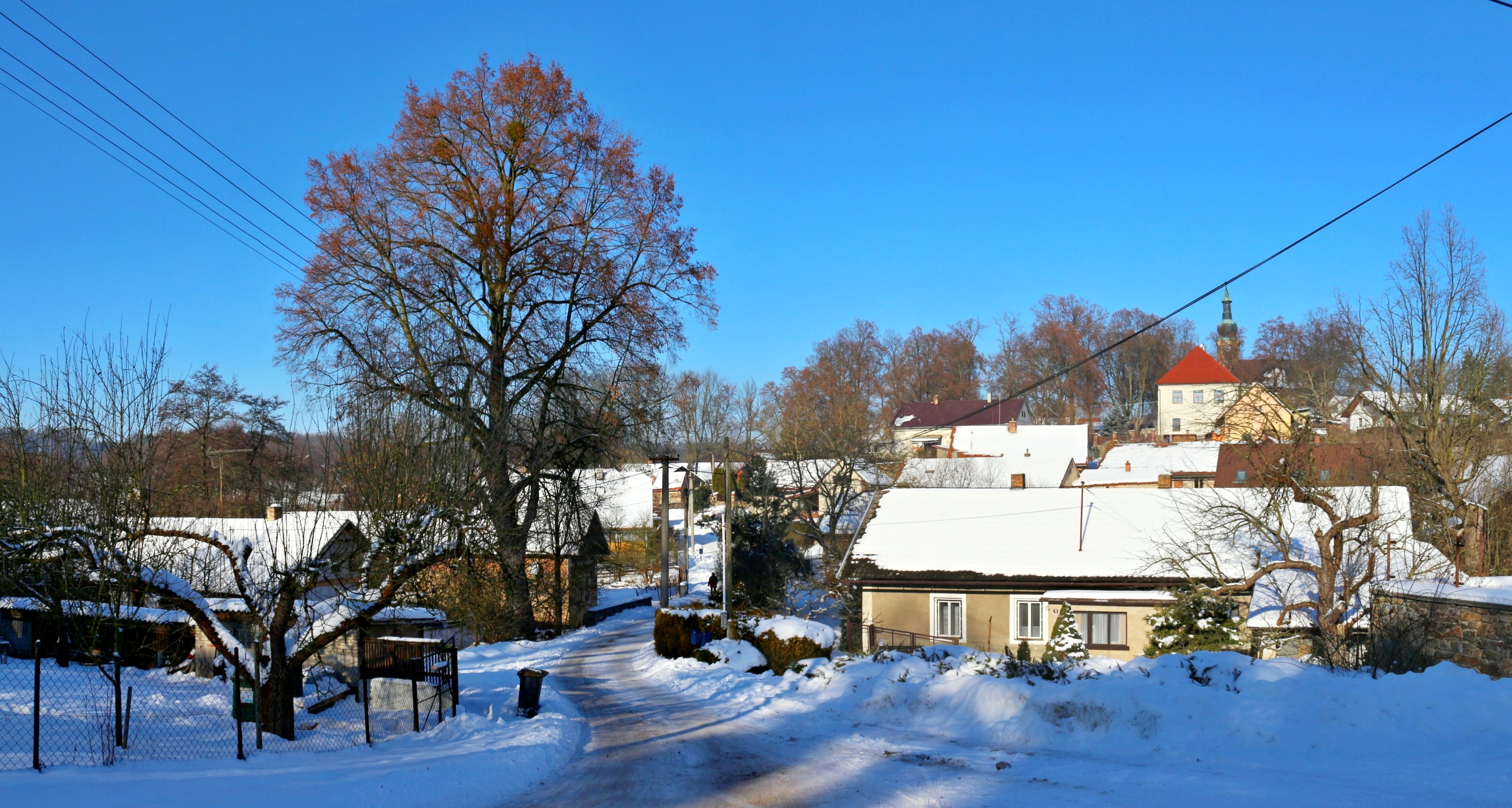
- View from the south

- Location in the Czech Republic
- Coordinates: 49°52′20″N 14°58′21″E
- Country: Czech Republic
- Region: Central Bohemian
- District: Kutná Hora
- First mentioned: 1284

Area
  - Total: 18.56 km^{2} (7.17 sq mi)
- Elevation: 416 m (1,365 ft)

Population (2026-01-01)
  - Total: 736
  - Density: 39.7/km^{2} (103/sq mi)
- Time zone: UTC+1 (CET)
  - Summer (DST): UTC+2 (CEST)
- Postal codes: 285 04, 285 06
- Website: www.obecuzice.cz

Úžice (German: Auschitz) is a municipality and village in Kutná Hora District in the Central Bohemian Region of the Czech Republic. It has about 700 inhabitants.

== Administrative division ==
Úžice consists of ten municipal parts (in brackets population according to the 2021 census):

- Úžice (127)
- Benátky (33)
- Čekanov (96)
- Chrastná (35)
- Františkov (7)
- Karlovice (0)
- Mělník (108)
- Nechyba (107)
- Radvanice (121)
- Smrk (76)

== Demographics ==
Historical population
Year	Pop.	±%
1869	1,619	—
1880	1,769	+9.3%
1890	1,770	+0.1%
1900	1,759	−0.6%
1910	1,589	−9.7%
1921	1,487	−6.4%
1930	1,373	−7.7%
1950	972	−29.2%
1961	956	−1.6%
1970	787	−17.7%
1980	675	−14.2%
1991	578	−14.4%
2001	590	+2.1%
2011	633	+7.3%
2021	710	+12.2%
Source: Censuses

== In popular culture ==
The 1403 recreation of the village, called Uzhitz, was prominently featured in Czech role-playing game Kingdom Come: Deliverance.
