= Komorní Hrádek =

- Village
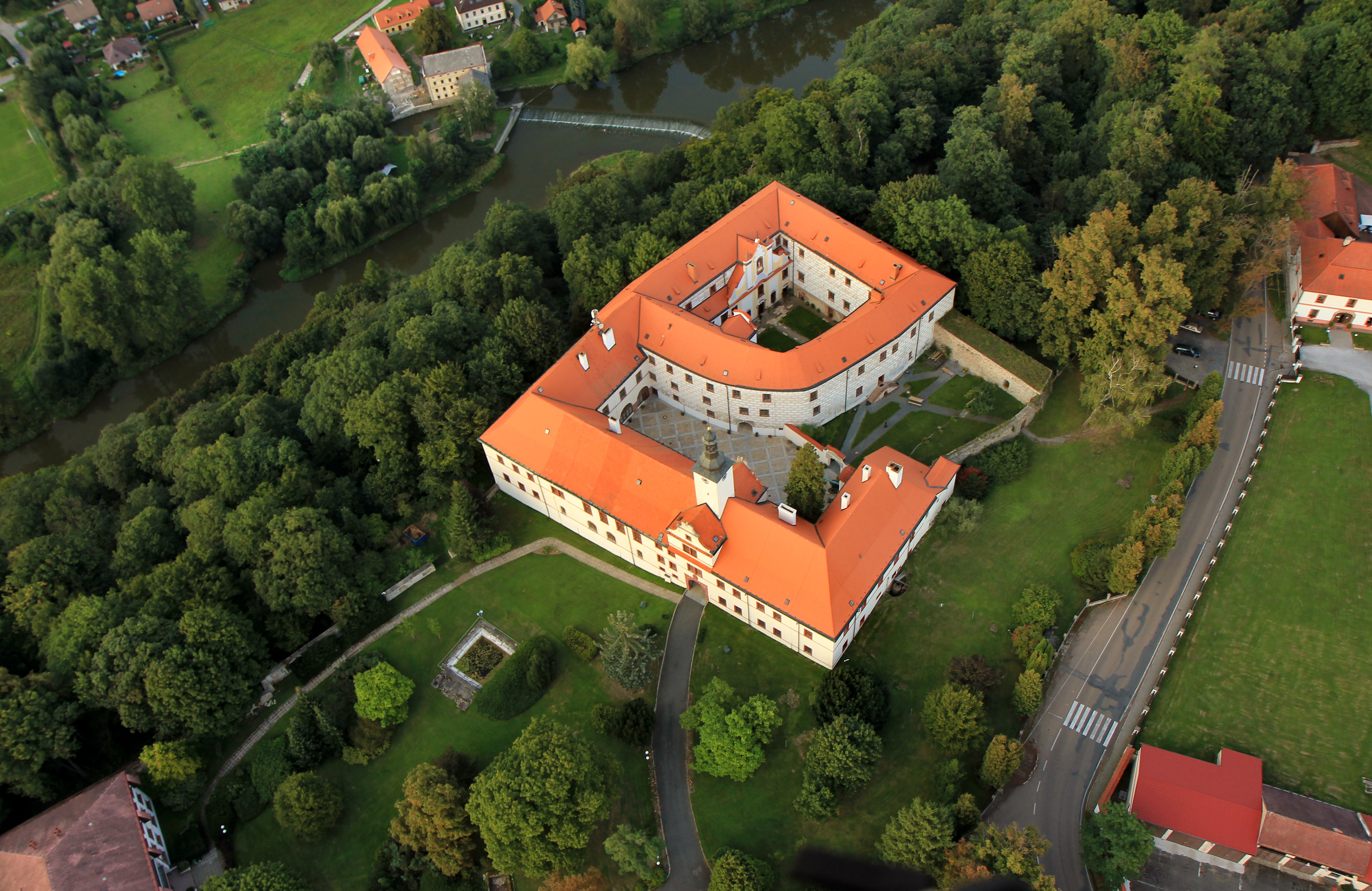
- Aerial view of the Komorní Hrádek chateau and surrounding land

- Location in the Czech Republic
- Coordinates: 49°51′1″N 14°47′56″E
- Country: Czech Republic
- Region: Central Bohemian Region
- District: Benešov District

Area
  - Total: 2.58 sq mi (6.69 km^{2})

Population (2011)
  - Total: 101
- Time zone: UTC+1 (CET)
  - Summer (DST): UTC+2 (CEST)
- Postal code: 257 24

Komorní Hrádek is a village located within the municipality of Chocerady in the Benešov District of the Czech Republic. It is on the left bank of the river Sázava. The village is home to a medieval castle that was rebuilt into a Baroque chateau. The first written mention of the village dates back to 1401.

== Landmarks ==
=== Čejchanov ===
Čejchanov is a ruined castle built before 1356. At the end of the 14th-century, the castle was taken by Mikeš Zoul of Ostředek and his son Jan Zoul of Ostředek. In retaliation, the castle was besieged and destroyed in 1404 by Zbyněk Zajíc of Hazmburk. It has been a protected cultural monument since 1965.

=== Chateau Komorní Hrádek ===
==== History ====
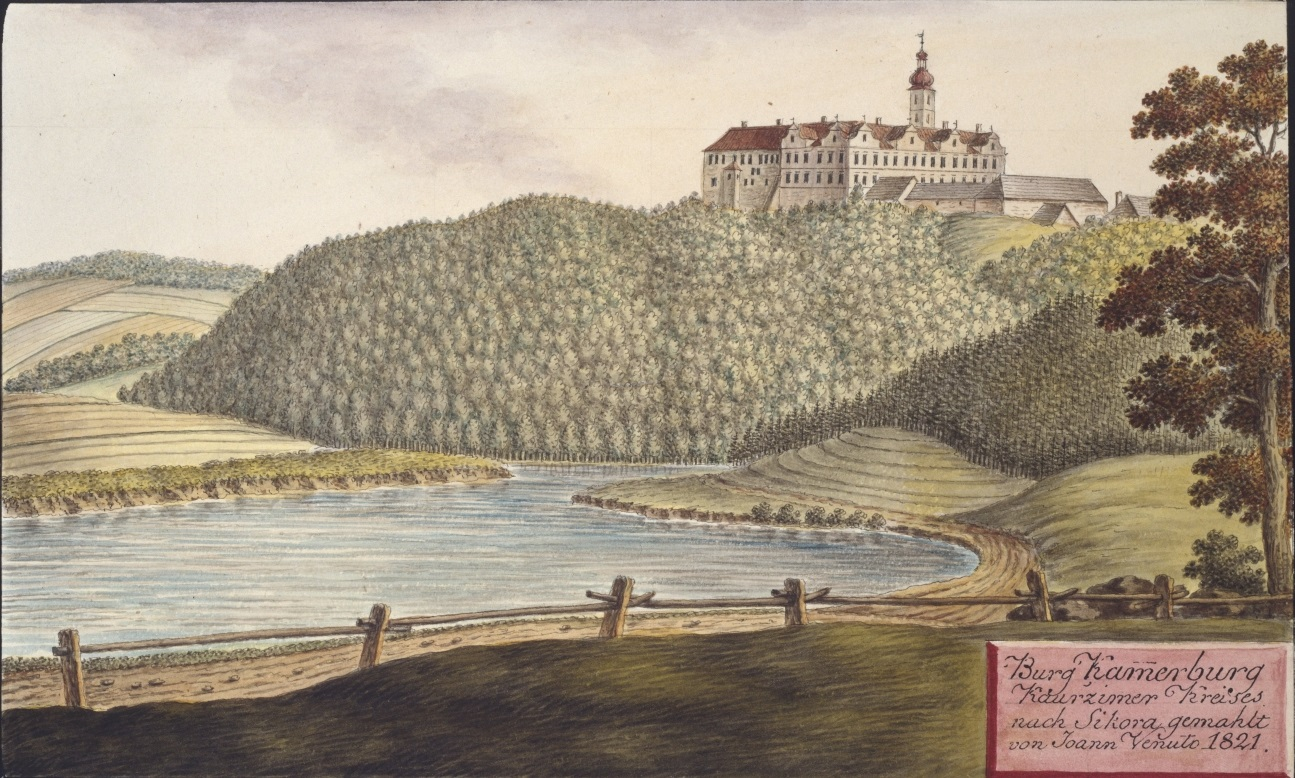
View of the chateau, drawing by Johann Venuto from 1821

Komorní Hrádek is home to the Chateau Komorní Hrádek. Originally, a castle called Veselé was founded by Racek Kobyla of Dvorce, the burgrave of Vyšehrad. This was permitted by King Wenceslas IV on 28 August 1412, however, the castle was most likely completed before Wenceslas authorized it. The castle was likely the replacement for the older Čejchanov (see above), only 200 meters to the west. The reason for Veselé replacing Čejchanov was likely Čejchanov's unsuitable position that rendered the castle easily endangered by firearms.

After the death of Racek Kobyla in 1416, his widow ceded the castle to the Hussite nobleman William Kostka of Postupice in 1422. At the beginning of the 16th century, Albrecht Rendl of Oušava acquired the castle from the Kostka family. In 1516, he sold the castle to Ludvík Zajímač of Kunštát. However, Zajímač's debts prevented him from completing the payment for the castle. So, in 1525 Albrecht's sons gave the estate to Jaroslav of Selmberk, and the castle's name was changed to Komorní Hrádek. Jaroslav reconstructed the castle into a Renaissance chateau. In 1554, the castle was bought by the Waldstein family. Count František Josef of Valdštejn sold the castle to Count Jan Adolf of Metsch in 1733.

==== Buildings ====
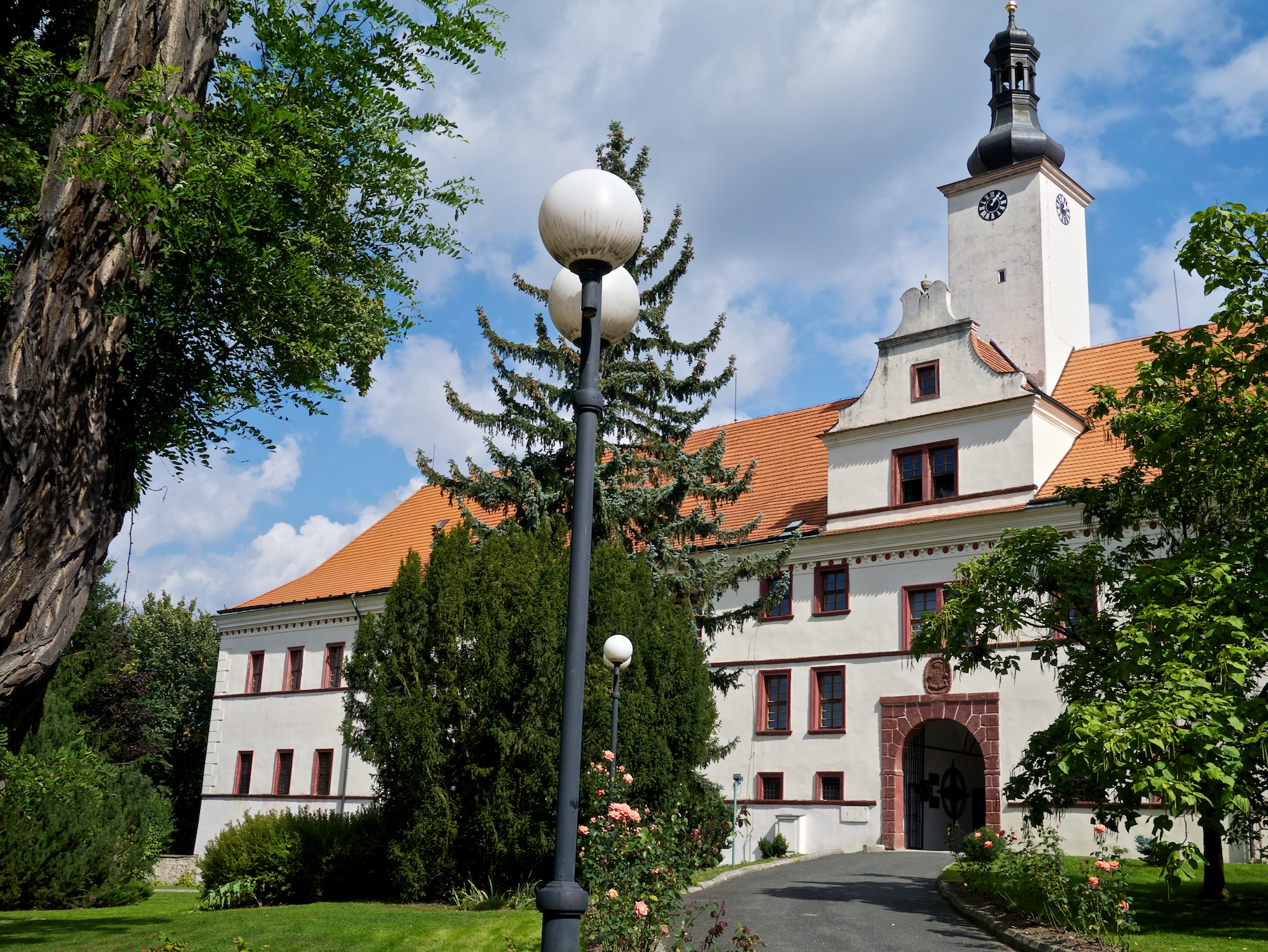
Western facade of the Chateau Komorní Hrádek

The castle had a fake entrance wing and several courtyards. The castle had a small square tower. A moat protected the entire castle. The castle contains the remains of two ruined buildings. The fort was strengthened by a massive gable wall with a preserved artillery cell. A battery tower probably stood in the southeast corner. The chateau has the remains of a two-storey older building from the second half of the 16th century. There is a rococo chapel of the Holy Trinity.

==== Design ====
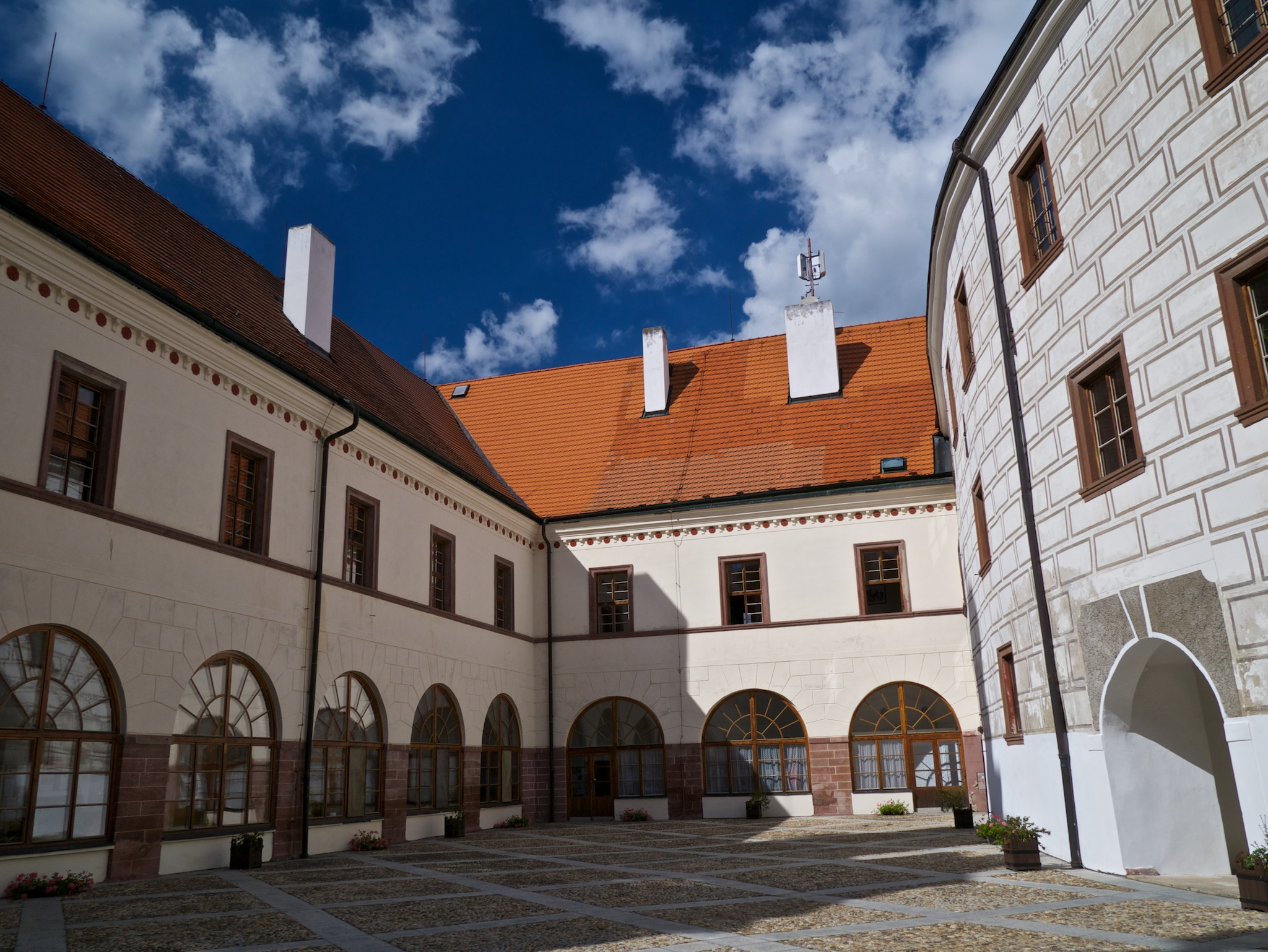
Courtyard of the Chateau Komorní Hrádek

The castle core had a four-circle floor plan and on the south and west side. The castle is centered around a diamond courtyard. The walls have sgraffito rustication.

Gothic masonry from the second decade of the 15th century has been preserved on the southern and western sides. The masonry from the same period has been partially preserved in the northern wing, while the appearance of the eastern side was completely changed during the Renaissance reconstruction. Three additional wings were added during the 17th century.

=== Loreto Chapel ===
In 1765, the Countess Marie Karolína of Khevenhüller had a Loreto Chapel built on the edge of the castle park near Vráž. She arranged for the Holy Mass to be offered in the chapel. Marie also ordered for a pilgrimage to the Our Lady of Sorrows to be celebrated in the chapel every third Sunday after Easter. On 10 August 1766, the chapel was consecrated by the abbot of the Sázava monastery, Leander Kramář. During the Josephine reforms in 1787, the chapel was abolished and a wooden Marian statue was transferred to the church in Vranov on 25 April. The abolished chapel was then used as a warehouse. In 1870, Princess Antonie Khevenhüllern-Metsch died, planning to restore the chapel as a place of pilgrimage. Her relatives had the original chapel demolished and a new chapel was built in its place in 1872, according to a drawing by a Viennese architect. The princess was then buried in it.
