= Racek Kobyla of Dvorce =

14th-century Bohemian nobleman

- Royal Hetman of Wenceslaus IV; Burgrave of Stříbrná Skalice; Burgrave of Vyšehrad
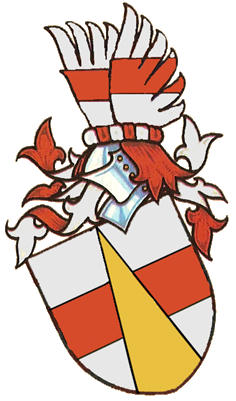
- Coat of arms
- Born: 1370s
- Died: 2 February 1416; Kutná Hora
- Spouse: Anna of Úlibice

Racek Kobyla of Dvorce (also Dvojic, Dvojitz, or Dwoygicz; died 2 February 1416) was a Bohemian landowner, hetman of Wenceslaus IV of Bohemia, and burgrave of Stříbrná Skalice and Vyšehrad during the Late Middle Ages.

== Early career ==
Racek was likely born in the 1370s. Not much is known about his early life. He had a reputation as a robber knight, having spent years in the service of Prokop of Moravia.

== Royal service ==
Racek was appointed burgrave of Skalice Castle by King Wenceslaus IV in 1403. Later that year, the town was razed by Sigismund of Luxembourg. Racek initially retreated to Talmberk after evacuating the town. Reportedly, only an elderly woman and a pig were left in Skalice. Fleeing the continuing threat of Sigismund, Racek sought refuge in Rataje nad Sázavou, where he was received by Hanuš of Lipá.

In the service of King Wenceslaus, Racek helped wage a guerrilla campaign against the Rosenberg family. He acted with other men such as Jan Žižka, Jan Sokol of Lamberk, and Matěj Vůdce. In 1410, he was appointed burgrave of Vyšehrad by Wenceslas. In the same year, Archbishop Zbyněk Zajíc of Hazmburk threatened to declare interdict over every scholar who refused to give up their writings of John Wycliffe. After the evaluation, the books were deemed heretical and were burned at the archbishop's courtyard. King Wenceslaus IV ordered the archbishop and his subordinates to compensate the book owners. When they refused, the king tasked Racek and Wok of Waldstein with confiscating their property. He was since hated by the Anti-Wycliffite faction of the clergy.

In 1412, Wenceslaus permitted Racek to build his castle, Veselé, near present-day Chocerady. In 1415, he was mentioned as a patron of the Chocerady church.

== Death ==
The assassination of Racek Kobyla is well attested and can be considered as a prelude to the Hussite Wars. In 1416, Racek was sent to Kutná Hora to collect taxes for the king. As he was a known supporter of Jan Hus, the local Catholic preachers incited the townsfolk against him. On 2 February 1416, Racek and 12 of his associates were murdered in an inn by a mob of miners fueled by anti-Hussite sentiment.

Přepadli je v domě, v němž byli ubytováni, rozsekali jejich těla na kusy a rozházeli na ulici, kde pak ve vzteku po nich šlapali a za zpěvu veselých písní šli v houfech k domu kněží, aby byli pochváleni za to, co dle jejich výzvy vykonali.

"They seized them in the inn where they were staying, cut their bodies into pieces and threw them out onto the street, where the mob vigorously stomped on their remains and then went in merry song to the home of the preacher to be praised for the act they had been encouraged to commit."

— Bohdan Dobiáš, Přeloučtí mučedníci

Racek's castle, along with the villages of Chocerady, Údolnice, and Vráž, were left to his widow, Anna of Úlibic, together with the knights Mikuláš Šraňek and Mikuláš of Úlibic.

== In popular culture ==
Sir Radzig Kobyla, a character featured in the 2018 video game Kingdom Come: Deliverance, is based on Racek. In the game, he is the burgrave of Silver Skalitz, the town the player character hails from, and leads the pro-Wenceslaus faction alongside Divish of Talmberg and Hanush of Leipa. He also features in the 2025 sequel Kingdom Come: Deliverance II.
