= Jerome of Prague =

14/15th-century Czech reformist theologian and scholastic philosopher

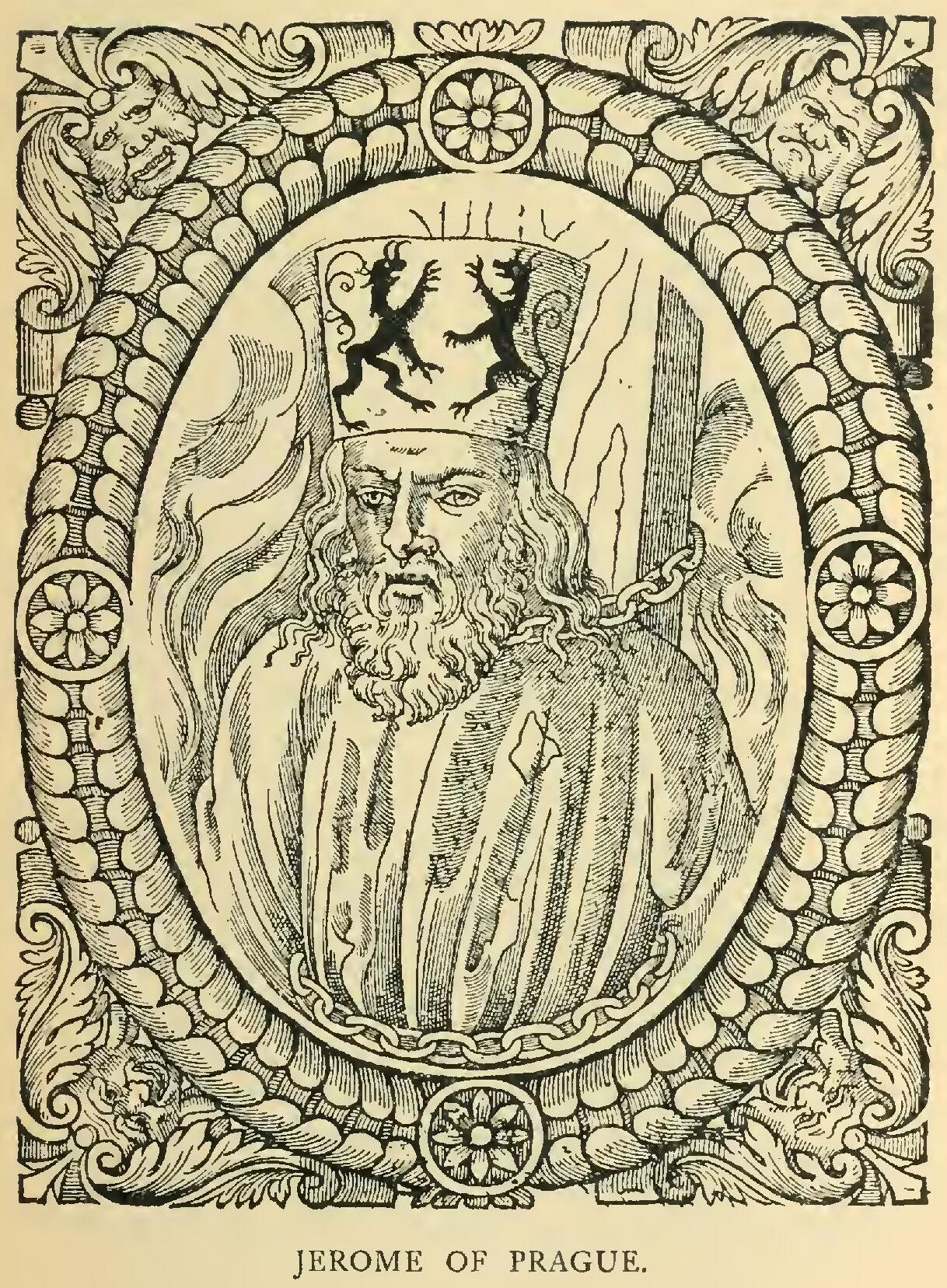
- 16th century Engraving of Jerome of Prague from Theodore Beza's Icones
- Born: 1379; Prague, Kingdom of Bohemia, Holy Roman Empire
- Died: 30 May 1416 (aged 36–37); Konstanz, Bishopric of Constance, Holy Roman Empire
- Education: University of Prague; Oxford University
- Notable work: Abjuratio; Scutum fidei christianae
- Title: Philosopher; Theologian; Professor
- Theological work
- Era: Bohemian Reformation

Jerome of Prague (Czech: Jeroným Pražský; Latin: Hieronymus Pragensis; 1379 – 30 May 1416) was a Czech scholastic philosopher and theologian. Jerome was one of the chief followers of Jan Hus and was burned for heresy at the Council of Constance.

== Early life ==
Jerome was born in Prague, Kingdom of Bohemia (now the Czech Republic), in 1379 and graduated from the Charles University of Prague in 1398. He later studied at Oxford University where he first became familiar with the reformist teachings of John Wycliffe. He was a philosopher, theologian, university professor, and church reformer who dedicated his life to eradicate those church doctrines and dogmas he found to be corrupt. He was constantly in and out of jail. His radical ideas eventually brought about his death by execution as a heretic to the church, but made him a martyr for the Protestant Reformation and followers of Jan Hus (known as Hussites).

He was well-educated and spent most of his life traveling, trying to incite religious reform in various cities. It was for his criticisms rather than heresy that he was martyred.

== Early life and education ==
Jerome spent time teaching at the universities of Paris, Cologne, and Heidelberg, but was accused of heresy at all these universities and forced to return to Bohemia. He spent much of his life traveling about various universities, but frequently returned to Bohemia where he was virtually safe from any prosecution. He earned popular renown, as his rhetoric and oratory skills were acclaimed and often roused the public into demonstrations against the church, although they sometimes ended badly. He secured, in 1399, permission to travel. In 1401 he returned to Prague, but in 1402 visited England, where, at Oxford University, he copied out the Dialogus and Trialogus of John Wycliffe, and thus evinced his interest in Lollardry. He became an ardent and outspoken advocate of realism and, thereafter, of Wyclifism; charges of which were constantly getting him into trouble. In 1403 he went to Jerusalem, in 1405 to Paris. There he took his master's degree, but Jean Gerson drove him out. In 1406 he took the same degree at the University of Cologne, and a little later at the University of Heidelberg.

He was no safer in Prague, where he returned and where, in 1407, he took the same degree. In that year he returned to Oxford, but was again compelled to flee. During 1408 and 1409 he was in Prague, and there his pronounced Czech preferences aroused opposition to him in some quarters. Early in January 1410, he made a cautious speech in favour of Wycliffe's philosophical views, and this was cited against him at the Council of Constance four years later. In March 1410, a papal bull against Wycliffe's writings was issued, and on the charge of favouring them, Jerome was imprisoned in Vienna, but managed to escape to Moravia. For this he was excommunicated by the bishop of Kraków. Returned to Prague, he appeared publicly as the advocate of Hus. Popular legend attributes to Jerome leadership of a protest in which papal bulls were first strung around the neck of a prostitute in a cart and then carried to the pillory in Prague to be publicly burned, but the leader was actually Wok of Waldstein.

== Middle life and teachings ==
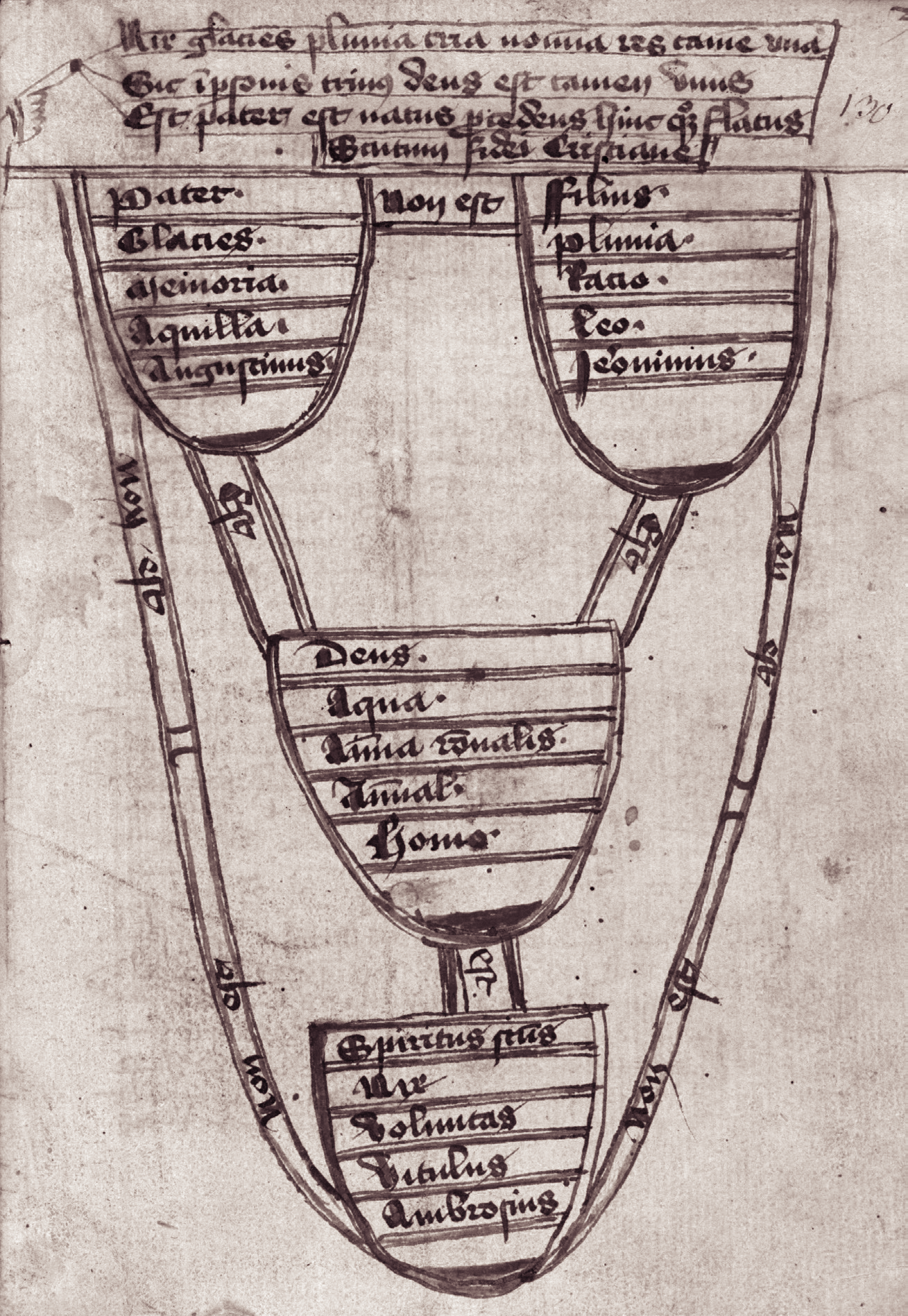
"Scutum fidei Christianae" diagram

Jerome tended to teach radical ideas pertaining to Roman Catholic doctrine, namely that God's teachings were directly accessible to a Christian without need for the church or church officials. He taught that one should obey the direct teachings of Jesus, even when they conflicted with those of the Catholic Church. He was largely a follower of the ideologies of both church reformers John Wyclif and Jan Hus. As his teachings were contrary to those of the Roman Catholic Church, he was constantly on the run from authorities. Hus, although much less disruptive in his approach, was a mentor for Jerome.

Jerome incited public demonstrations in Paris, Vienna, Prague, and everywhere in between; most of these demonstrations took place in cities with universities where Jerome taught. Teaching at universities allowed Jerome to reach a broad audience. In Kraków, he was publicly examined as to his acceptance of the forty-five articles which the enemies of Wyclif had made up from Wyclif's writings and which they asserted represented Wyclif's heretical teachings. Jerome declared that he rejected them in their general tenor.

== Trial and death ==
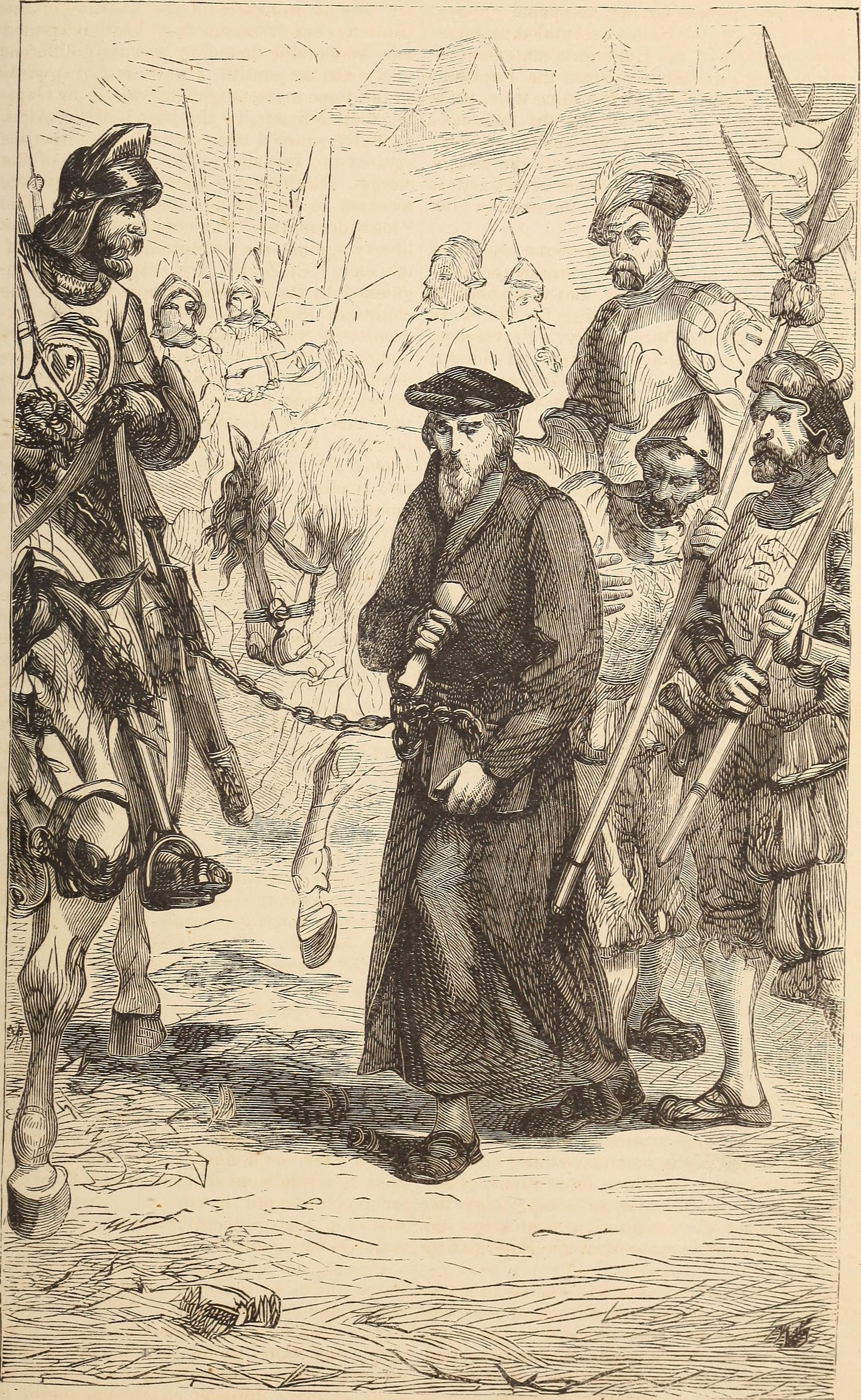
Jerome of Prague being dragged to prison, 1870 illustration

When, on 11 October 1414, Hus left for the Council of Constance, Jerome assured him that if needed, he would come to his assistance, contrary to the wishes of Hus. Upon Hus' arrival in Constance he was arrested and imprisoned. Jerome kept his promise, even though Hus and other friends of Jerome warned him not to come. On 4 April 1415, he arrived at Constance. Predictably, he created a stir in the town.

Jerome's friends persuaded him to return to Bohemia. But on his way back he was arrested in Hirschau on 20 April and taken to Sulzbach, where he was imprisoned, and was returned to Constance on 23 May. He was immediately arraigned before the council on the charge of fleeing a citation.

The humanist Poggio Bracciolini, present in those days in Constance, left a direct testimony of Girolamo's trial and execution, through a letter in Latin addressed to Leonardo Bruni on the same day as he was sentenced to the stake.

Conducted in public and commanded to respond to each accusation, for a long time he refused to answer, stating that he would first clarify his position rather than respond to the specific accusations made by his opponents [...] But deny him this possibility, so he said below: "What iniquity is this, which for a good 340 days I have been in a very hard prison, in a thousand ugliness, in the filth, in the stocks, in the lack of everything, while you have always listened to my accusers and detractors, and "Now do you not want to listen to me for an hour? Having given them an audience for so long, they have persuaded you that I am a heretic, an enemy of faith and a persecutor of the church. You have judged in your minds that I am a wicked man, before having could have known which man I really am. But I remind you that you are men, not gods, you are mortal, not immortal, you can spend, err, be deceived and seduced [...]"

But having been repeatedly interrupted by the clamor and noise of many, in the end it was decided in the Council that Girolamo mainly replied on the errors of which he was accused, and that he was then granted the faculty of being able to speak as much as he wanted [...]

The accusations of being a detractor of the papacy and of the Roman pope, enemy of the cardinals, persecutor of the prelates and of the clergy and enemy of the Christian religion, rejected the doctrinal orthodoxy on the doctrine of the Eucharist, and he was insulted with titles of hypocrite and donkey.

The hearing was postponed three days later, he was allowed to speak: he remembered the fate of Socrates, Plato's imprisonment, the tortures suffered by Anaxagoras and Zeno, the death of Boethius and the condemnations of John the Baptist, of Christ and of saint Stephen. "But being the whole weight of the cause placed on the witnesses of the prosecution, with many reasons he showed that they should not be trusted, showing that they had said all those things not for the sake of truth but out of hatred, malevolence and envy [...] They were the minds of the surrounding contracted and bent almost to mercy [...]".

Everyone was waiting for him to admit and retract his errors and ask for forgiveness but "in the end he began to praise a certain John Hus, who had been condemned to the stake and said he had been a good man, just, holy and not worthy of that death. Prepared with a strong and constant mind to support any suspicion rather than giving in to his enemies, to those false witnesses, who will not be able to lie before God, when they will have to give an account of things said. The pain of the surrounding was great and everyone wished he was spared death, if he really had been sincere. Girolamo, persevering in his convictions, praised that Giovanni and confirmed that he had never heard him say anything against the state of the church of God, but against the perverse customs of the clerics, against the arrogance and pomp of the prelates, also devastators of church property. Since the assets of the churches had to be distributed first to the poor, then to the pilgrims and to the church factory, it was not worthy to spend them with prostitutes, at banquets, in horses, in dogs, in pumping clothes and in so many other unworthy things of the religion of Christ".

He was still given two days to confess his alleged faults; after which, on May 30, 1416, it was judged a heretic by the council and condemned to the stake.

To whom he came with a playful forehead and with a happy face, not frightened by fire, not by torments, not by death, and there was never any stoic who, like him, sustained death with such a strong and constant heart. When he arrived at the place of torture, he stripped himself of his clothes and, kneeling down, greeted the pole to which he was then tied with many ropes and was tightened, naked, with a chain. After much wood had been placed around his chest and kidneys, mixed with straw, and fire was set, Girolamo began to sing a certain hymn, which was interrupted by smoke and flames.

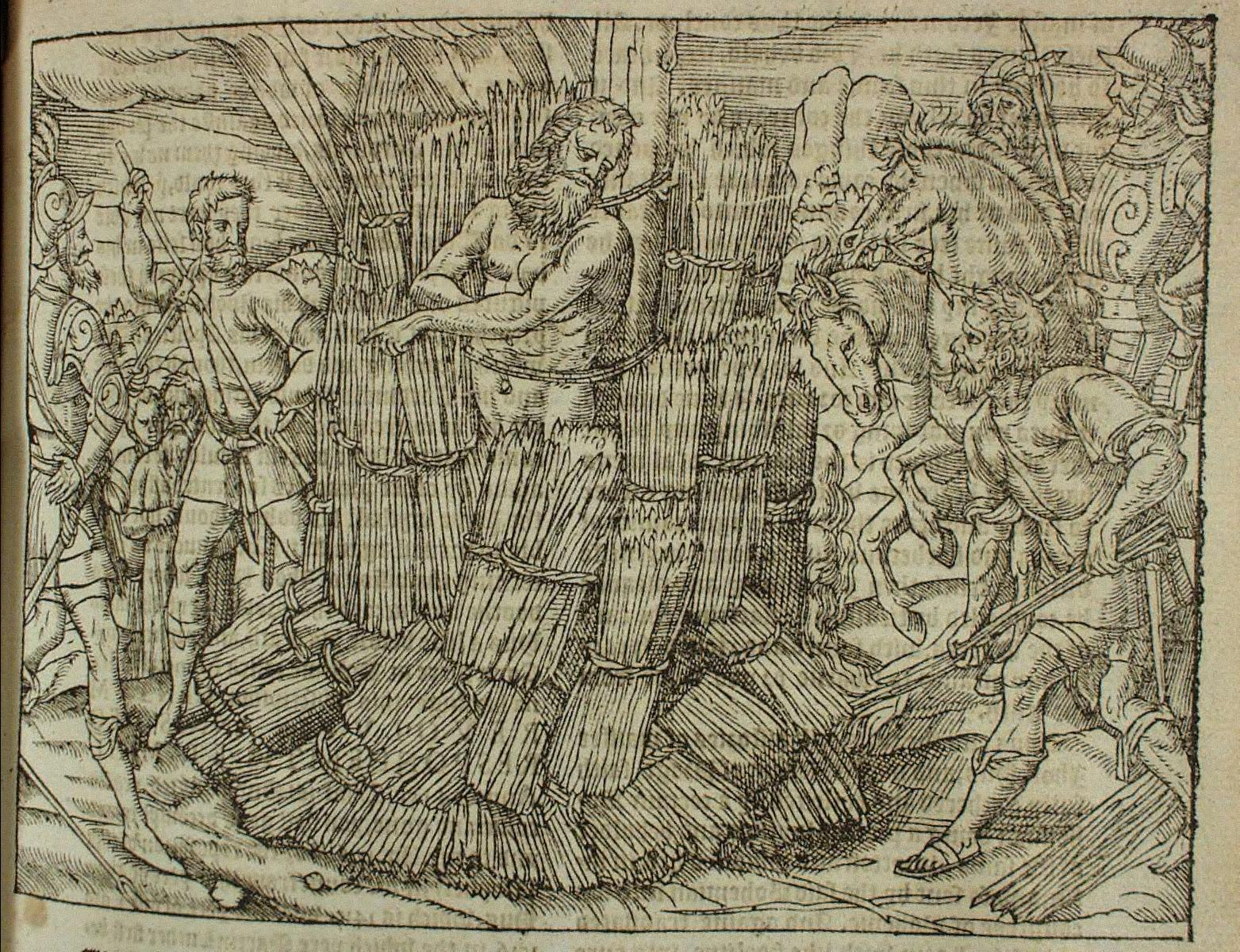
The burning of Jerome of Prague, John Foxe's Book of Martyrs (1563)

His condemnation was predetermined in consequence of his open acceptance of the heretical views and ideas of Wyclif, especially on the Eucharist, and his open admiration for Hus and his doctrines. Refusing to recant those beliefs, the council used the conditions of imprisonment to coerce Jerome to recant his heresies. In public sessions of the council on 11 and 23 September 1415 Jerome abjured his heresies and renounced Wyclif and Hus. In letters to the king of Bohemia and the University of Prague, he declared that he had become convinced that Hus had been rightfully burned for heresy. (Hus had been burned at the stake while Jerome was imprisoned.) However, he remained imprisoned as the council rightly doubted the sincerity of his recantation. On 23 May 1416, and on 26 May, he was again brought before the council in order for them to ascertain the truth of his abjuration. On the second day he withdrew his recantation, and as a result, having "again fallen" back into heresy, he was condemned by the council and handed over to the secular authorities to be burned. Subsequently, Jerome was claimed as a martyr of the Hussites and adopted by later Protestants such as John Foxe to demonstrate a historical “past" for the new denominations of the sixteenth century Protestant Reformation.
