= Siege of Znojmo =

1404 siege

Siege of Znojmo (1404)
- Part of the Moravian Margrave Wars
Date	July–August 1404
Location	Znojmo, Margraviate of Moravia
Result	Bohemian victory; withdrawal of the besieging army

Belligerents
Kingdom of Bohemia; Margraviate of Moravia	Kingdom of Hungary; Duchy of Austria

Commanders and leaders
Jan Sokol of Lamberk; Hynek I Suchý Čert of Kunštát and Jevišovice	Sigismund of Luxembourg; Albert IV, Duke of Austria †

Strength
Several thousand defenders	Approximately 24,000 men

Casualties and losses
Unknown	Heavy; possibly several thousand deaths from dysentery

The Siege of Znojmo (1404) was an unsuccessful six-week attempt by the combined forces of Sigismund of Luxembourg, King of Hungary, and Albert IV, Duke of Austria, to capture Znojmo in July and August 1404. The town was defended by troops loyal to the Margraviate of Moravia, commanded by the knights Jan Sokol of Lamberk and Hynek I Suchý Čert of Kunštát and Jevišovice. The siege was a major episode of the Moravian Margrave Wars. Despite their numerical superiority, the attackers failed to take the town and eventually withdrew. Both Sigismund and Albert fell seriously ill during the campaign, and Albert died in September 1404.

== Background ==
Following the death of Charles IV, political stability gradually deteriorated in the Lands of the Bohemian Crown and the Holy Roman Empire. Moravia was jointly ruled by the sons of John Henry, Margrave of Moravia, the brothers Jobst and Prokop of Luxembourg. Both had supported the ambitions of their cousin Sigismund to obtain the crowns of Poland and Hungary, including by providing financial assistance for his acquisition of the Hungarian crown.

The King of Bohemia, Wenceslaus IV, also sought financial support from his Moravian cousins. After a period of relative peace and cooperation during the 1380s, however, a struggle for power developed within the House of Luxembourg. Sigismund and Jobst initially cooperated, while Wenceslaus sought support from his younger brother John of Görlitz and from Prokop. The relationship between the two Moravian margraves also deteriorated towards the end of the 14th century, partly because of disputes over the distribution of revenues from Brandenburg.

In March 1402, Sigismund captured his brother Wenceslaus IV. In June of the same year, Prokop was lured from Bezděz Castle and imprisoned through an operation involving Sigismund and Jobst. Jobst subsequently broke with Sigismund and indicated that he might seek power in Bohemia. He sided with Wenceslaus and established links with opposition groups in Hungary.

Sigismund allied himself with Albert IV of Austria, a member of the House of Habsburg, and the conflict expanded. In 1403, however, an uprising broke out in Hungary, forcing Sigismund and Albert to withdraw their forces from Moravia to suppress it. At the end of 1403, Wenceslaus escaped from captivity in Vienna and removed the government installed by Sigismund. Sigismund and Albert then launched another military campaign into the Bohemian lands.

== Siege ==
The siege is mentioned by contemporary sources and later discussed by historians including František Palacký and Karel Vladislav Zap.

The Austrian and Hungarian forces advanced into Moravia in two armies. In July 1404, the armies of Sigismund and Albert, each reportedly numbering around 12,000 men, joined forces outside Znojmo, one of the principal border strongholds of the Moravian margraves. Protected by its town walls and favourable terrain above the Dyje River, the defense of Znojmo was led by Jan Sokol of Lamberk and Hynek Suchý Čert of Kunštát, both experienced military commanders who also operated as robber knights. The attacking armies surrounded the town while ravaging the surrounding countryside and launched several assaults, reportedly using catapults and cannons.

Despite their considerable numerical advantage, the attackers failed to breach the town's gates. The defenders are also said to have mounted a counterattack outside the walls, during which some of the siege equipment was burned. Dysentery then spread widely through the attacking army, possibly as a result of a contaminated water supply. According to some accounts, several thousand besiegers died from the disease. Sigismund and Albert also fell seriously ill. It has been suggested that they may instead, or additionally, have been poisoned, although this remains uncertain. Albert died at Klosterneuburg, near Vienna, on 14 September 1404, while Sigismund recovered after undergoing a severe course of treatment.

The besieging forces eventually abandoned the operation and withdrew towards Austria. According to later accounts, some abandoned catapults and cannons were left in their camp.

== Aftermath ==
The siege was a major event in the Moravian Margrave Wars and temporarily weakened Sigismund's political influence. Prokop of Luxembourg was released from his imprisonment in the Carthusian monastery in Brno, but died on 4 September 1405, reportedly as a consequence of the hardships he had suffered in captivity.

After Prokop's death, Jobst became the sole ruler of Moravia and gradually reached an accommodation with his cousins Wenceslaus IV and Sigismund. At the end of 1410, Jobst was briefly elected King of the Romans, but died in January 1411. As he and Prokop had both died without heirs, Moravia passed to Wenceslaus IV, who permanently united the Kingdom of Bohemia and the Margraviate of Moravia under one ruler. He confirmed the traditional liberties of the Moravians and appointed his court official Lacek of Kravaře as provincial governor.
