= Hynek I Suchý Čert of Kunštát and Jevišovice =

14th-century Moravian nobleman

- Burgrave of Znojmo
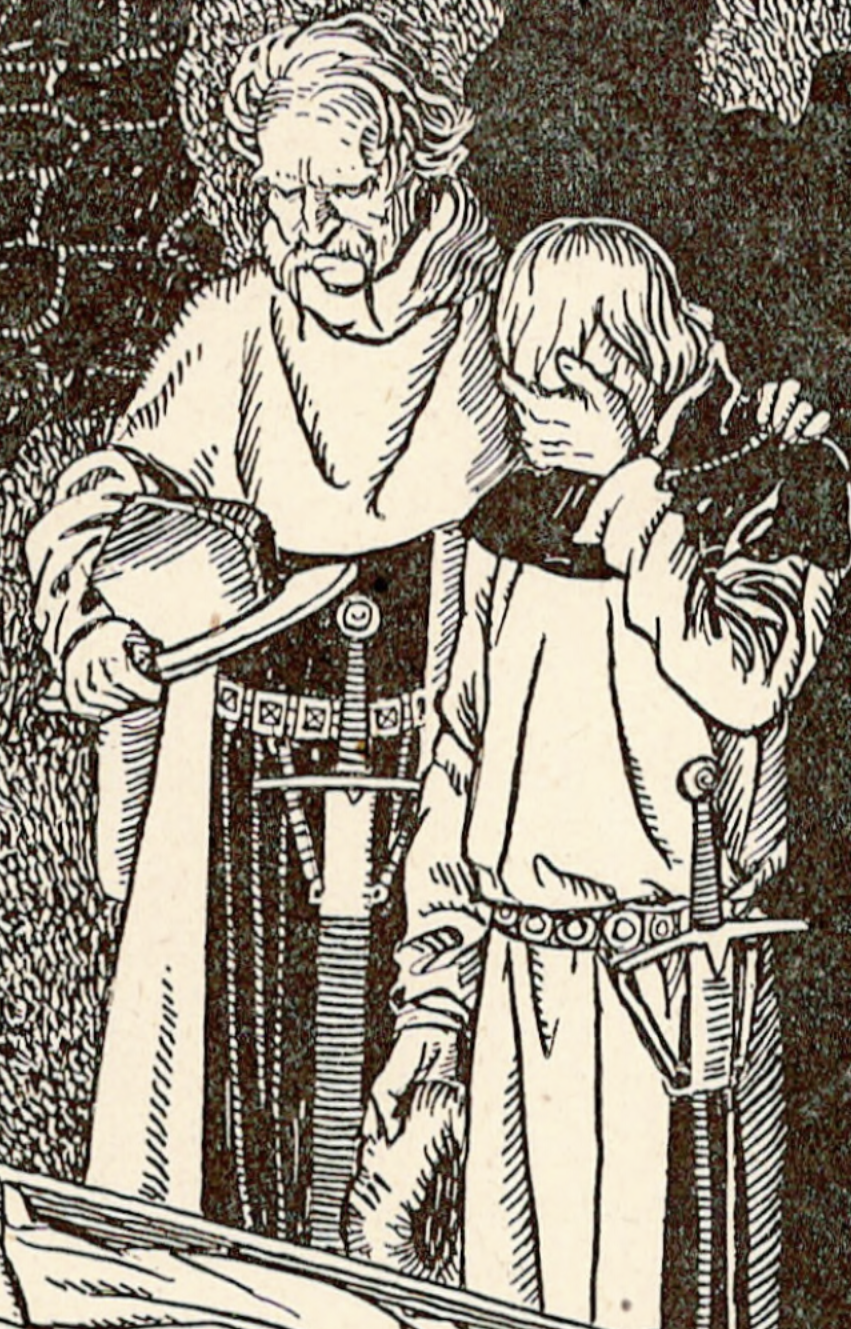
- Hynek (left) depicted in Suchý čert a divoký sokol, 1926

- Coat of arms
- Native name: Hynek I. Suchý Čert z Kunštátu a Jevišovic
- Other names: Hynek the Dry Devil
- Died: 1408
- Noble family: Kunštát and Poděbrady family
- Spouse: Anna of Deblín

Hynek I Suchý Čert of Kunštát and Jevišovice (died 1408) was a Moravian nobleman from the Kunštát and Poděbrady family. He was an infamous robber knight and supporter of Prokop of Luxembourg.

== Biography ==
Hynek was born to Sezema II of Jevišovice. In 1390 he was made lord of Přímělkov. He was given the honorific "Suchý Čert" (English: Dry Devil) for his tall and thin physique, his dry temperament, and for the devilish manner in which he persecuted his enemies. He married Anna of Deblín, but she died before 1398.

He and his brother, Jindřich, became well known during the Moravian Margrave Wars fighting for Margrave Prokop. Hynek in particular took an active role in the conflict. He captured Znojmo Castle and was named hetman. He was further awarded Castle Rabštejn in 1401. Hynek earned a reputation as a robber knight, and was active in assaulting merchant caravans alongside Jan Zoul of Ostředek.

In 1404, Sigismund of Luxembourg and Albert IV of Austria lead the Siege of Znojmo against Hynek and Jan Sokol of Lamberk. Hynek orchestrated raids that destroyed much of the besiegers equipment. The siege was ultimately lifted after six weeks.

After the death of Prokop, Hynek continued to raid around Moravia and Austria. As a result, he was imprisoned in 1406. He went on to join the retinue of Albert V of Austria and died in 1408.

== Legacy ==
The Jevišovice Historical Festival in Jevišovice is held in honor of Hynek and his successes against Sigismund.

Hynek is featured in the 2025 video game Kingdom Come: Deliverance II, named Hynek the Dry Devil.
