= Jevišovice =

- Town
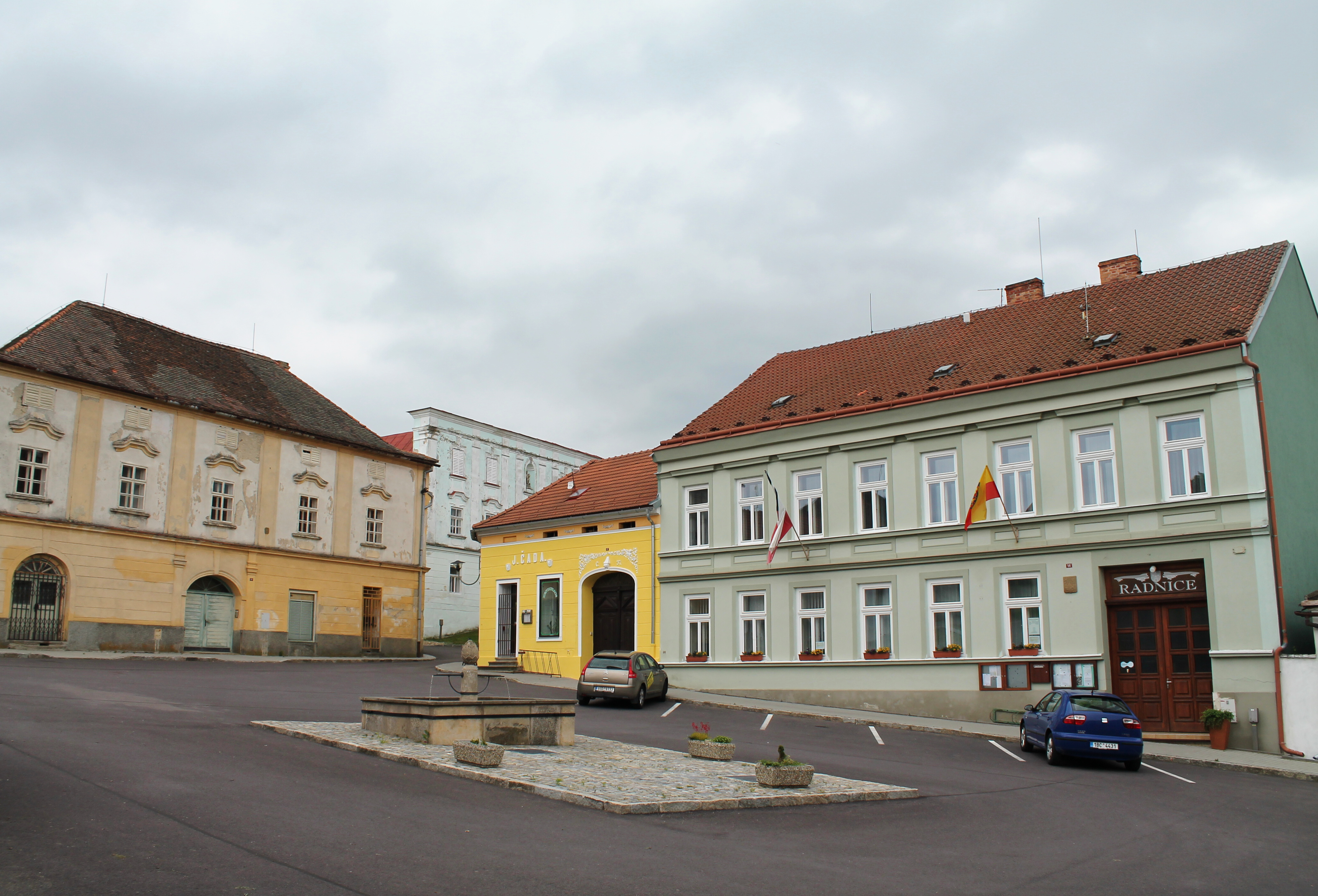
- Town square

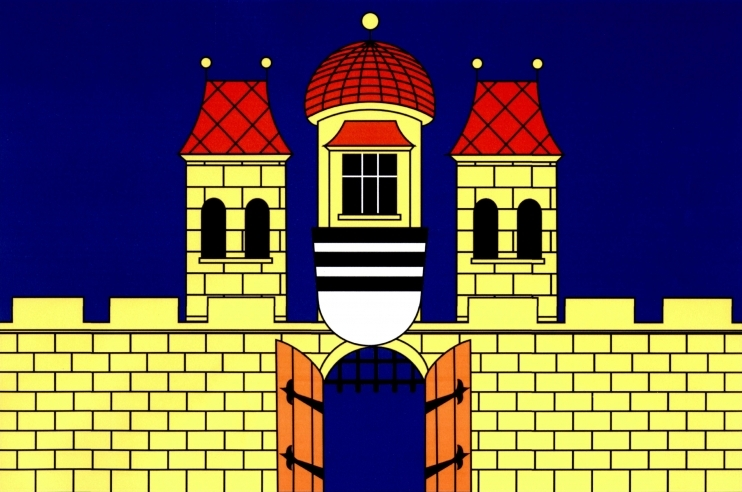
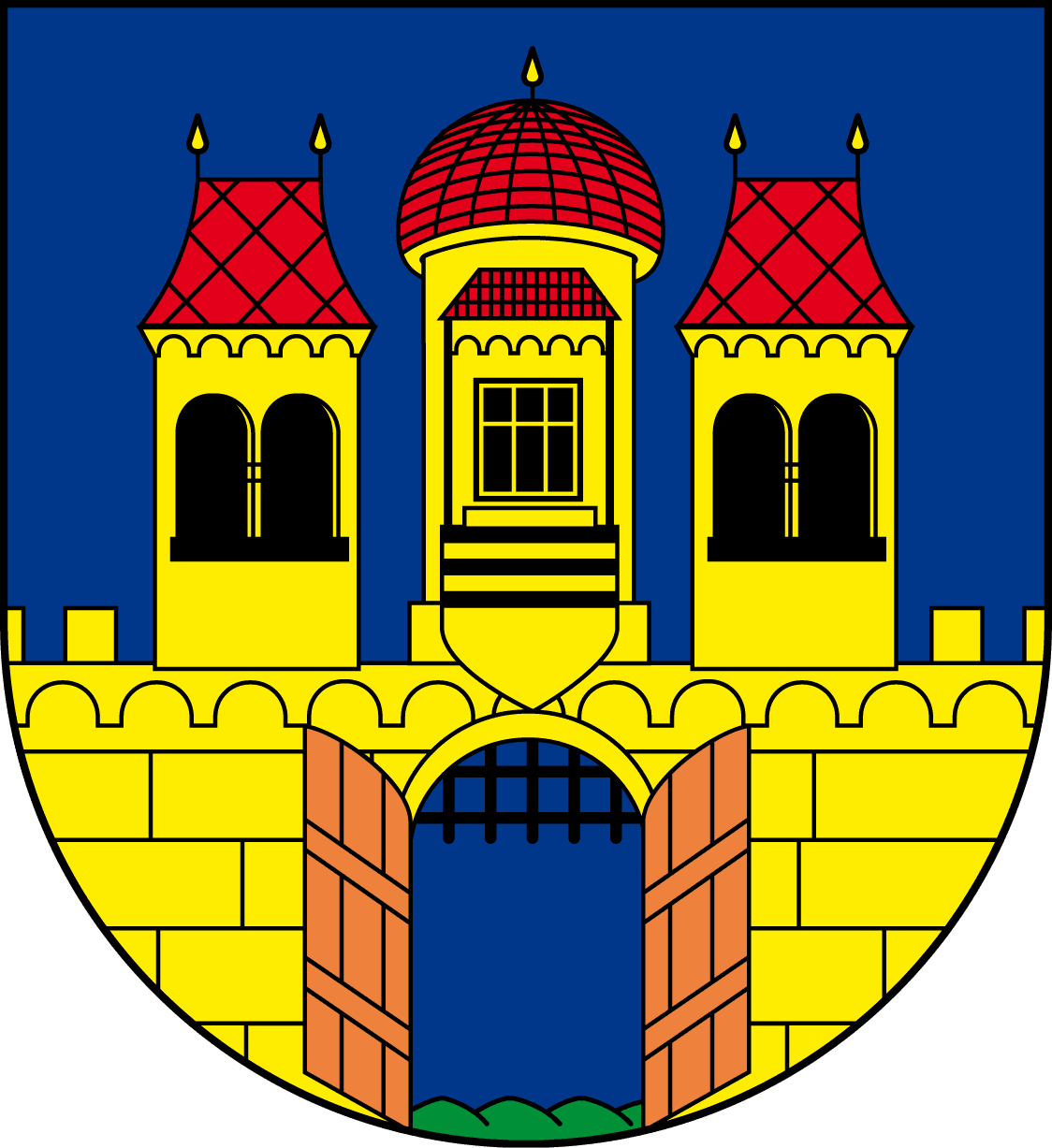
- Flag Coat of arms

- Location in the Czech Republic
- Coordinates: 48°59′15″N 15°59′24″E
- Country: Czech Republic
- Region: South Moravian
- District: Znojmo
- First mentioned: 1289

Government
  - Mayor: Pavel Málek (STAN)

Area
  - Total: 7.86 km^{2} (3.03 sq mi)
- Elevation: 352 m (1,155 ft)

Population (2026-01-01)
  - Total: 1,156
  - Density: 147/km^{2} (381/sq mi)
- Time zone: UTC+1 (CET)
  - Summer (DST): UTC+2 (CEST)
- Postal code: 671 53
- Website: www.jevisovice.cz

Jevišovice (Czech pronunciation: [ˈjɛvɪʃovɪtsɛ]; German: Jaispitz) is a town in Znojmo District in the South Moravian Region of the Czech Republic. It has about 1,200 inhabitants. The town is located on the Jevišovka River. The historic town centre is well preserved and is protected as an urban monument zone.

== Geography ==
Jevišovice is located about 14 kilometres (9 mi) north of Znojmo and 48 km (30 mi) southwest of Brno. It lies in the Jevišovice Uplands. The highest point is at 403 m (1,322 ft) above sea level. The town is situated on the right bank of the Jevišovka River. The Jevišovice Reservoir is built here on the river.

== History ==
The first written mention of Jevišovice is from 1289. Until 1945, it was a town. In 2007, Jevišovice was restored the title of a town.

== Demographics ==
Historical population

Year	Pop.	±%
1869	1,087	—
1880	1,237	+13.8%
1890	1,182	−4.4%
1900	1,208	+2.2%
1910	1,319	+9.2%

Year	Pop.	±%
1921	1,222	−7.4%
1930	1,092	−10.6%
1950	973	−10.9%
1961	1,244	+27.9%
1970	1,190	−4.3%

Year	Pop.	±%
1980	1,138	−4.4%
1991	1,133	−0.4%
2001	1,167	+3.0%
2011	1,124	−3.7%
2021	1,150	+2.3%

Source: Censuses

== Transport ==
There are no railways or major roads running through the municipal territory.

== Culture ==
Every year in August, the Jevišovice Historical Festival takes place in Jevišovice. The festival includes historical pageant, historical theatre performance, and other activities. The festival is dedicated to the Moravian nobleman Hynek I Suchý Čert of Kunštát and Jevišovice.

== Sights ==
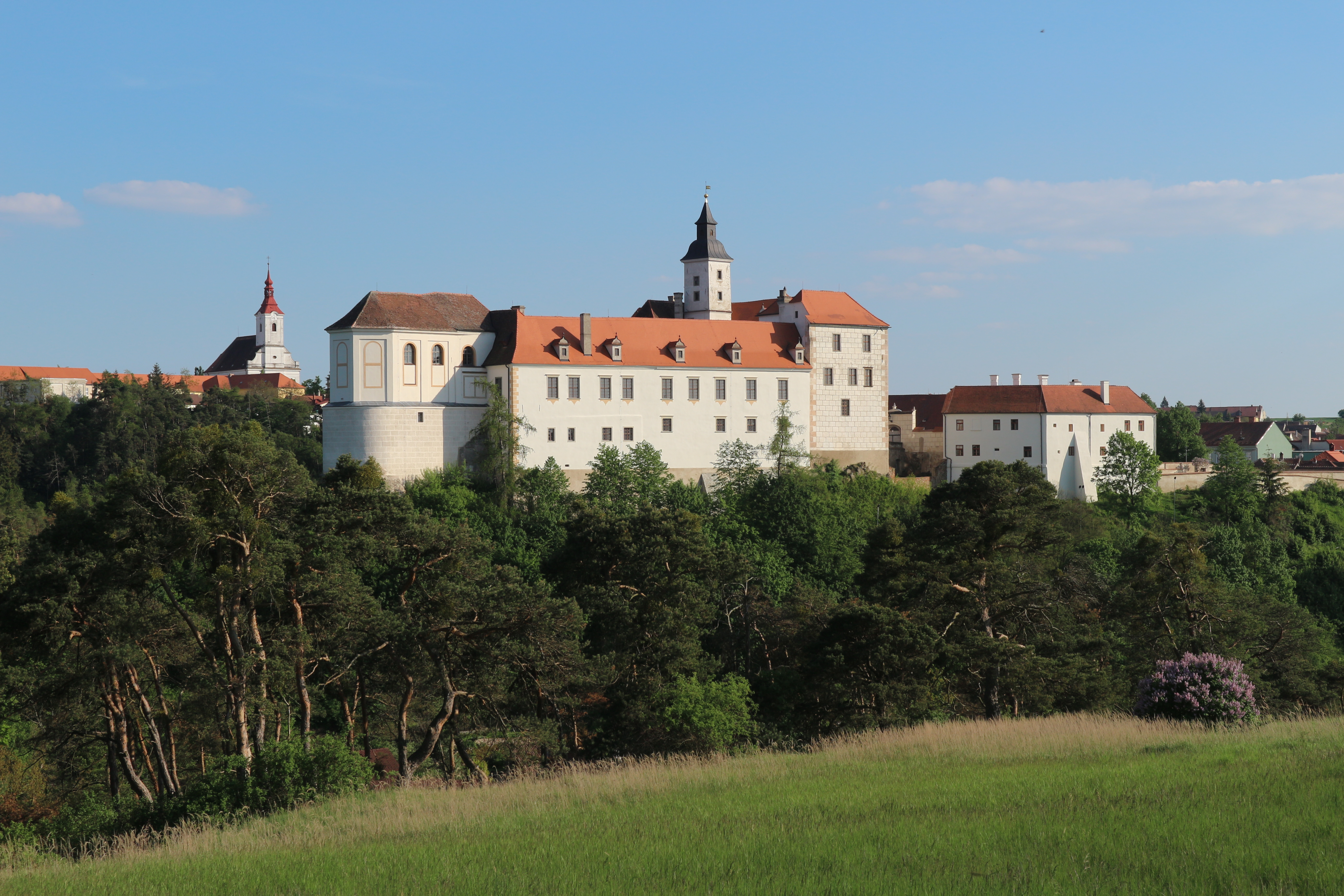
Starý zámek

The most significant monument is the castle Starý zámek ('old castle'). The original Gothic castle was rebuilt in the Baroque style by Jean-Louis Raduit de Souches in the first half of the 17th century. Today it is owned and administered by Moravské zemské muzeum in Brno and contains several expositions.

The castle Nový zámek ('new castle') was built by Jean-Louis Raduit de Souches in the early 1680s as a wooden Baroque hunting castle, and replaced in 1879 by the current structure. Today it houses a retirement house. It includes a large park with 22 Baroque sculptures, which is open to the public.

== Notable people ==
- Joann Venuto (1746–1833), painter
