= Jan Zoul of Ostředek =

Czech robber and nobleman

- Died: 13 July 1404; Prague, Kingdom of Bohemia
- Buried: 1411; St. Stephen's Church, Prague
- Father: Mikeš Zoul of Ostředek

Jan Zoul of Ostředek (died 13 July 1404) was a nobleman and robber knight of the Posázaví region in the 14th-century.

== Biography ==
Jan Zoul was formerly in the service of Wenceslaus IV of Bohemia, before joining the retinue of Prokop of Moravia. At the end of the 14th-century, the nobility rebelled and a coalition of lords was formed against Wenceslaus. Jan and his father, Mikeš Zoul of Ostředek, took advantage of the disorder and seized the castle Čejchanov near Chocerady. From there, they set out on raids throughout the Benešov region, acting with other robber knights such as Hynek the Dry Devil.

Jan fell out of favor with King Wenceslaus. He was briefly imprisoned by his royally-allied neighbor, Wenceslaus of Dubá, at Karlštejn. However, Jan was pardoned. The neighbors continued to war. In 1403, Jan seized Wenceslaus' castle Stará Dubá. In doing so, he was declared a land pest and was targeted by royal forces.

In 1404, King Wenceslaus sent a retaliatory army against Jan led by Archbishop Zbyněk Zajíc of Hazmburk, who recaptured Čejchanov as well as Stará Dubá. Jan, his father, and 50 members of their gang were executed by hanging in Prague on 13 July 1404. His body remained in the gallows for seven years before he was buried at St. Stephen's Church, Prague.

After his death, King Wenceslaus confiscated Jan's properties and redistributed them amongst his supporters.
