= Údolnice =

- Village
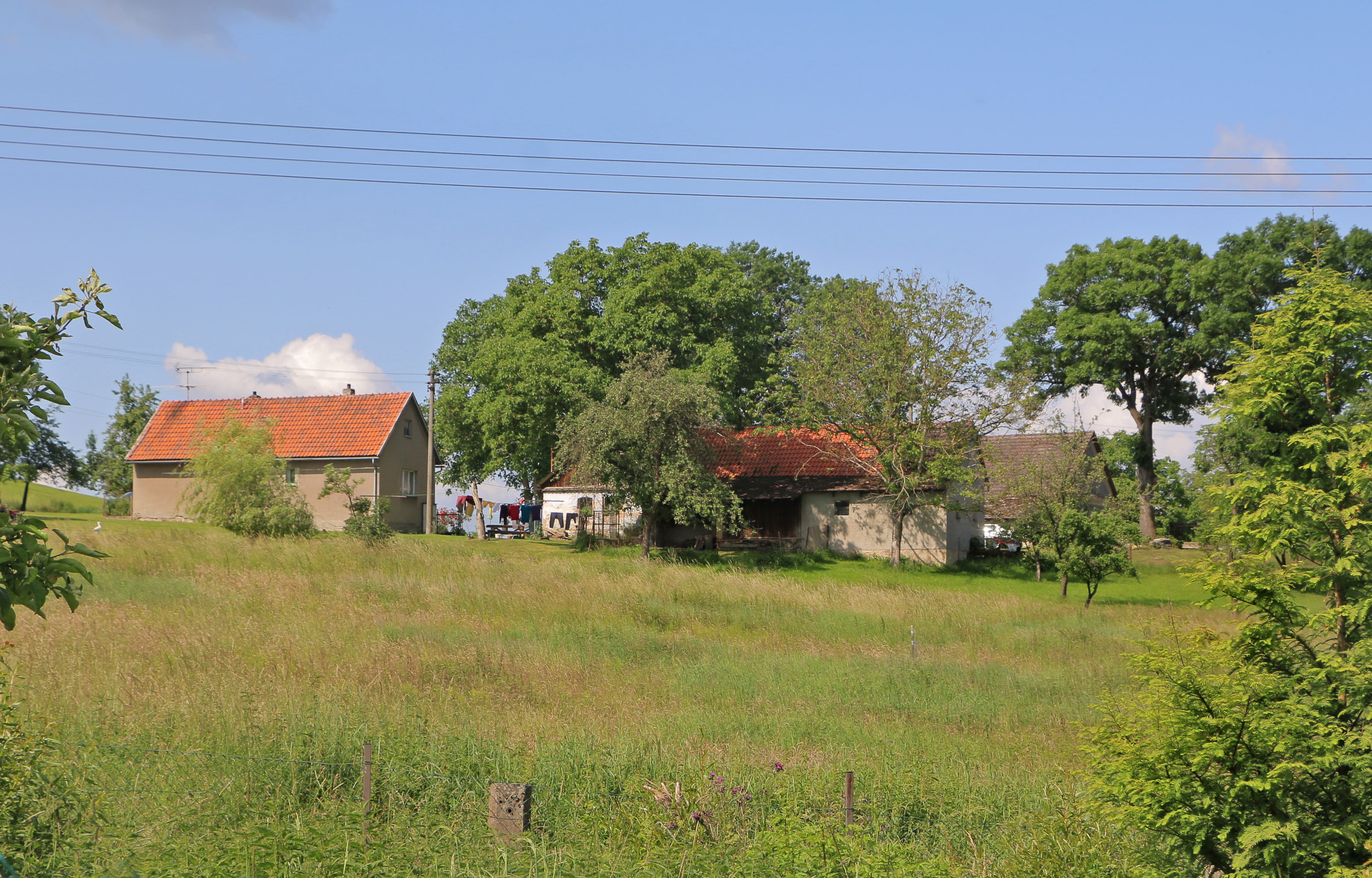
- Upper part of Údolnice

- Location in the Czech Republic
- Coordinates: 49°51′18″N 14°47′26″E
- Country: Czech Republic
- Region: Central Bohemian
- District: Benešov
- Municipality: Vranov
- First mentioned: 1422

Area
  - Total: 1.04 km^{2} (0.40 sq mi)
- Elevation: 385 m (1,263 ft)

Population (2021)
  - Total: 12
  - Density: 12/km^{2} (30/sq mi)
- Time zone: UTC+1 (CET)
  - Summer (DST): UTC+2 (CEST)
- Postal code: 257 24

Údolnice is a village and municipal part of Vranov in Benešov District in the Central Bohemian Region of the Czech Republic. It has about 10 inhabitants.

== History ==
The first written mention of Údolnice is from 1422.

== Demographics ==
Historical population
Year	Pop.	±%
1869	58	—
1880	47	−19.0%
1890	48	+2.1%
1900	51	+6.2%
1910	53	+3.9%
1921	47	−11.3%
1930	36	−23.4%
1950	27	−25.0%
1961	17	−37.0%
1970	12	−29.4%
1980	8	−33.3%
1991	6	−25.0%
2001	6	+0.0%
2011	8	+33.3%
2021	12	+50.0%
Source: Censuses
