= Joann Venuto =

Czech clergyman and painter

- Jan Antonín Venuto
- Born: 24 May 1746; Jevišovice, Margraviate of Moravia
- Died: 1 April 1833 (aged 86); Hradec Králové, Austrian Empire

Joann Anton Venuto, also styled as Jan Antonín Venuto, (24 May 1746 – 1 April 1833) was a Czech clergyman, watercolorist, draftsman, and cartographer. He specialized in the paintings of Bohemian and Moravian castles.

== Biography ==
Venuto was born on 24 May 1746 in Jevišovice, in the Margraviate of Moravia (present-day Czech Republic). In 1769, he became a canon living with Bishop Jan Leopold Hay at the Cathedral of the Holy Spirit, Hradec Králové. He died on 1 April 1833.

== Gallery ==
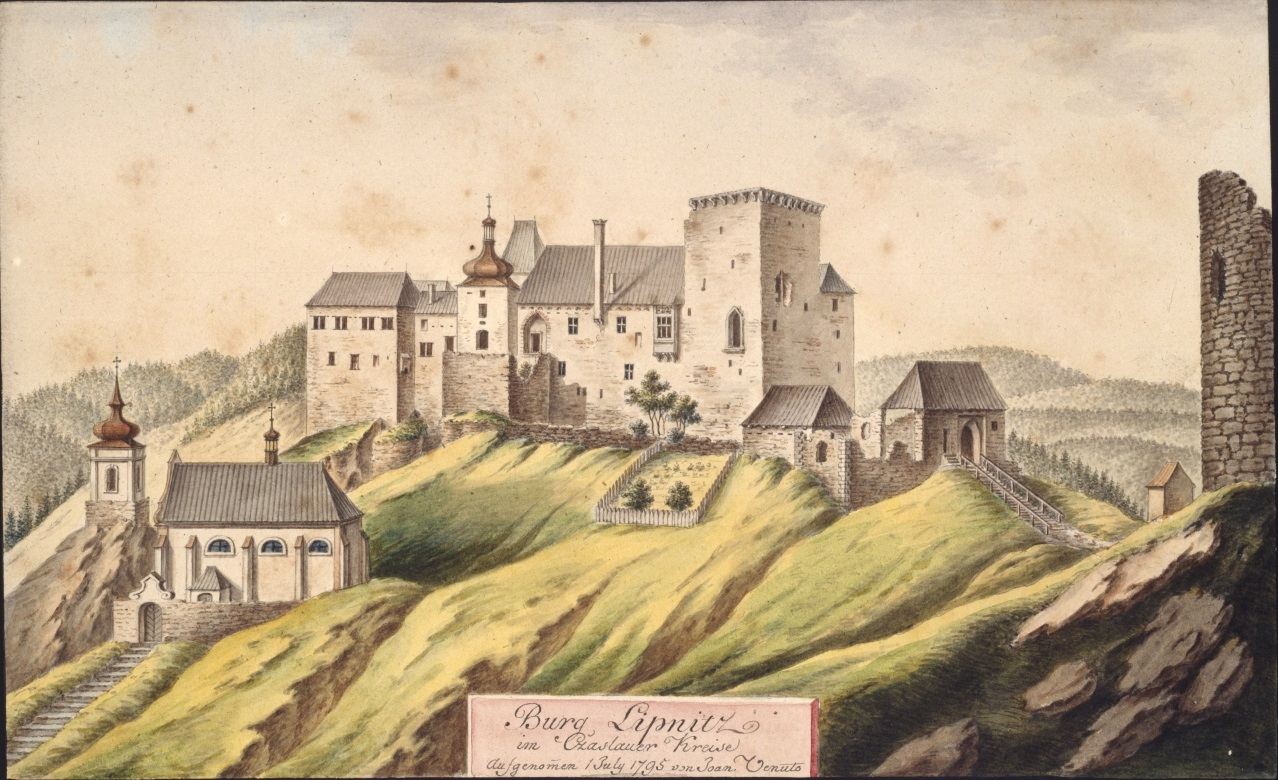
Hrad Lipnice v Čáslavském kraji (1795)

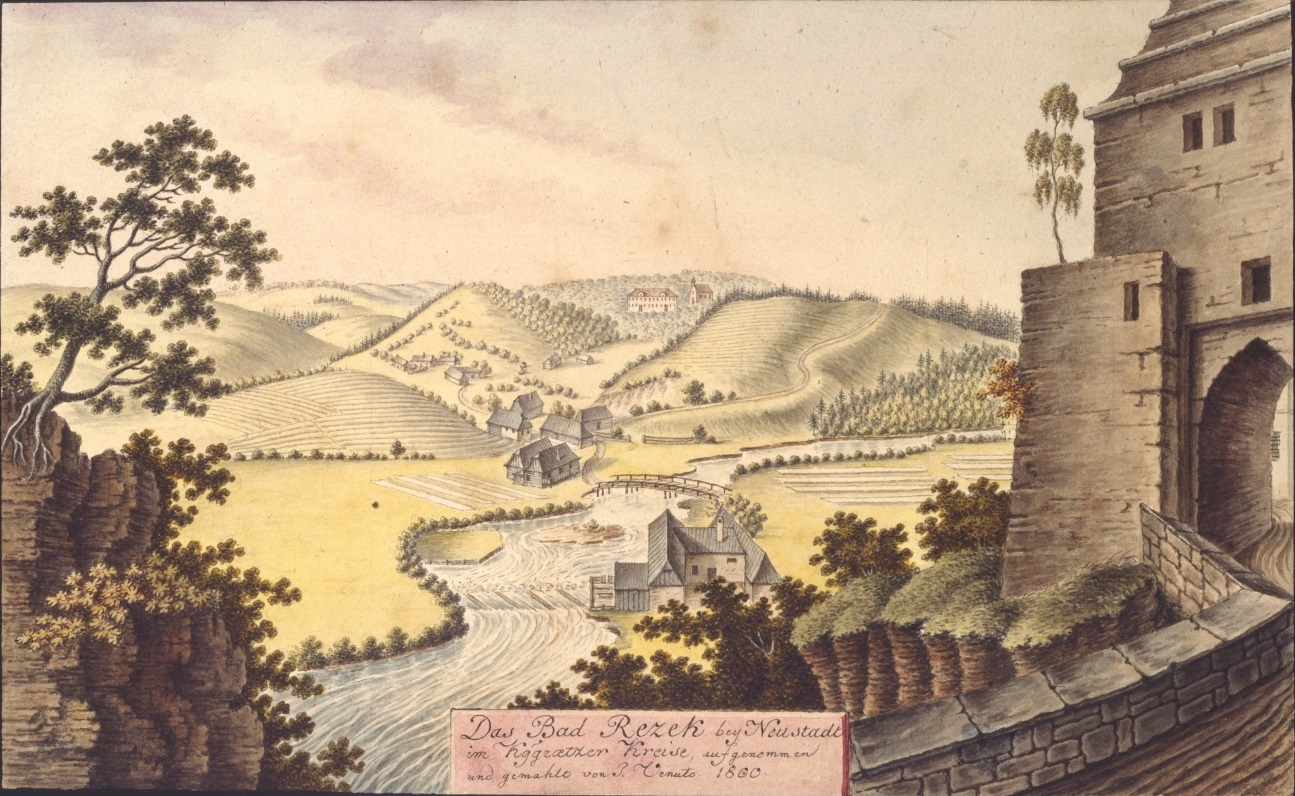
Nové Město nad Metují (1800)

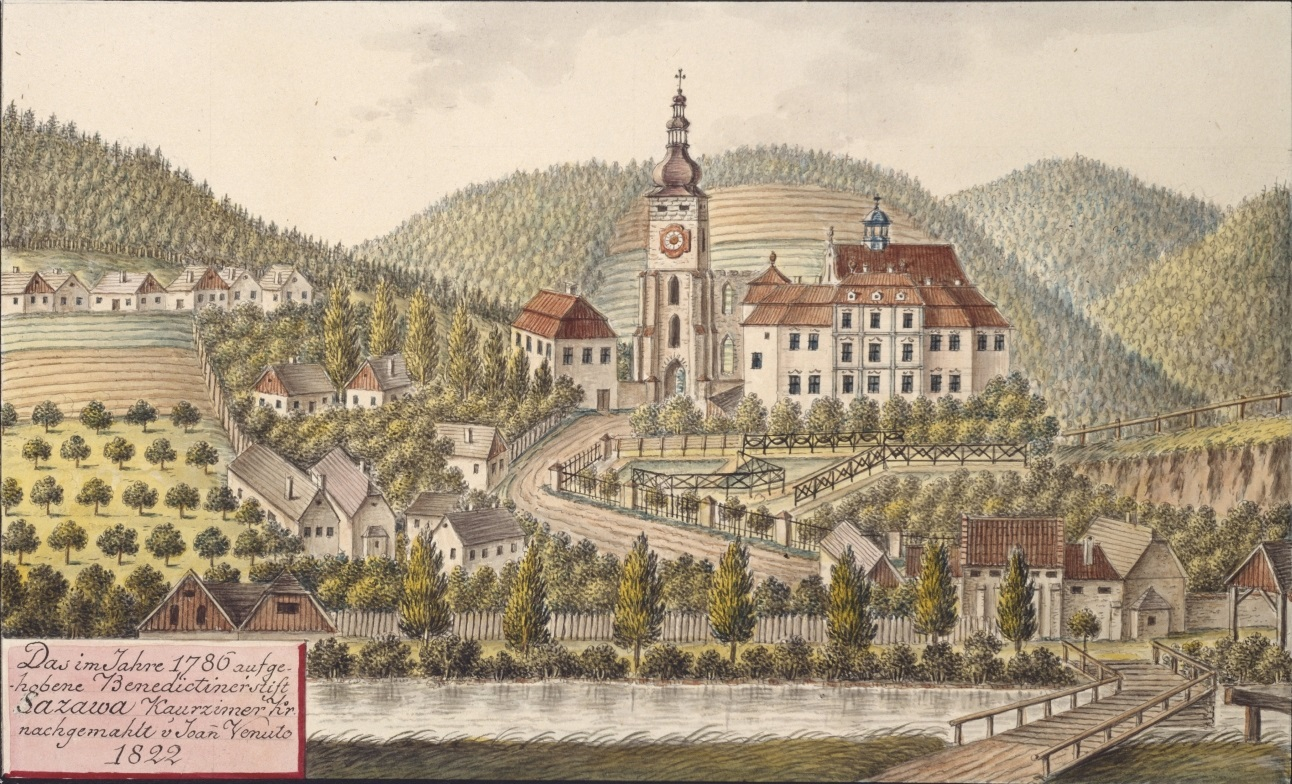
Sázavský klášter (1822)

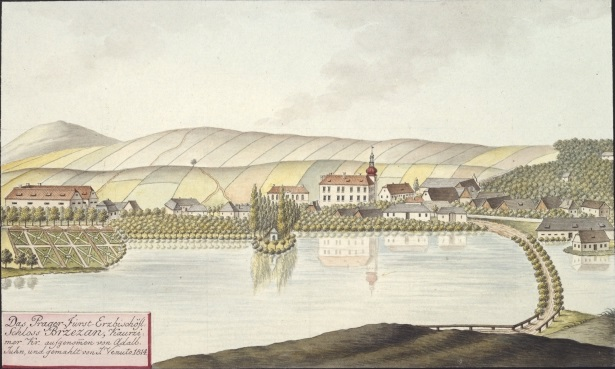
Dolní Břežany (1814)

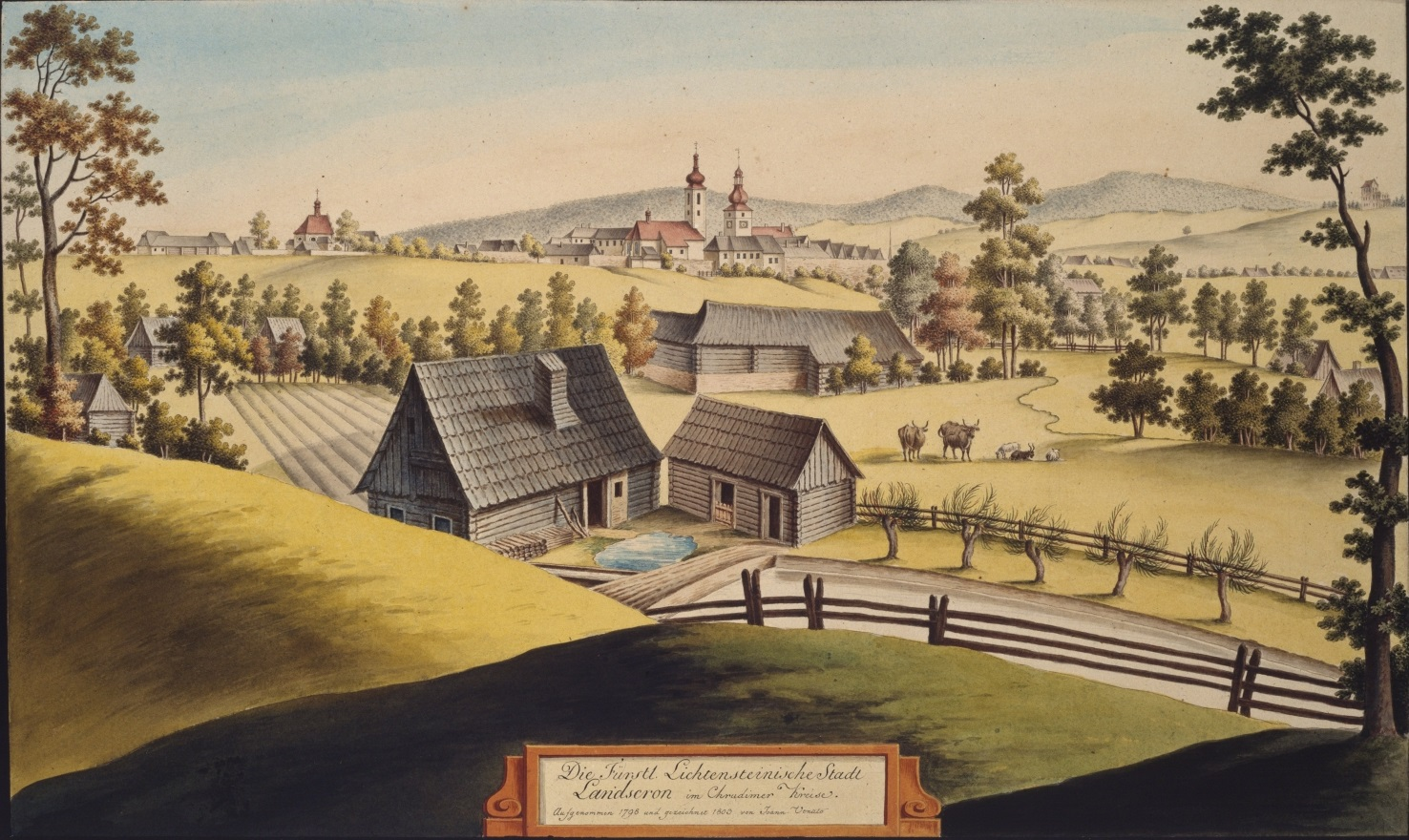
Město Lanškroun (1803)

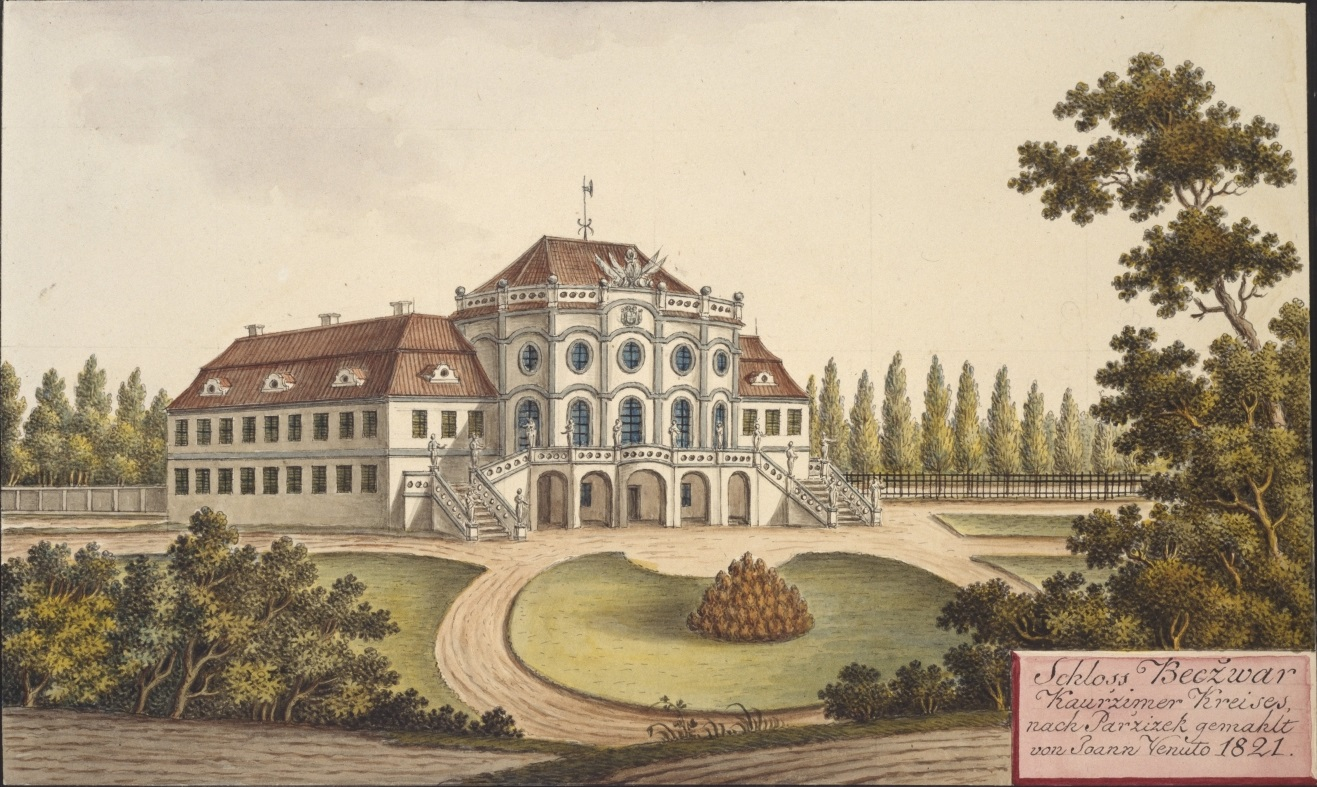
Zámek Bečváry (1821)
