= Wok of Waldstein =

15th-century Bohemian nobleman

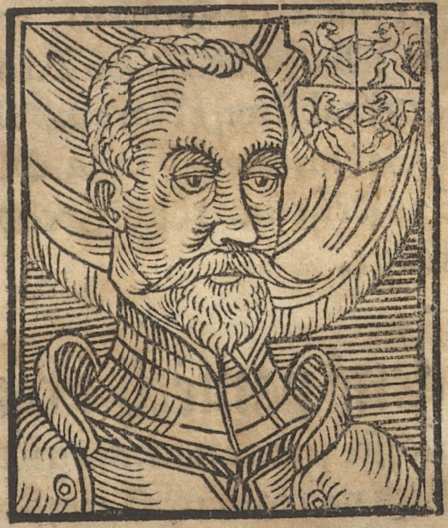
- 17th-century depiction of Wok of Waldstein by Bartosz Paprocki

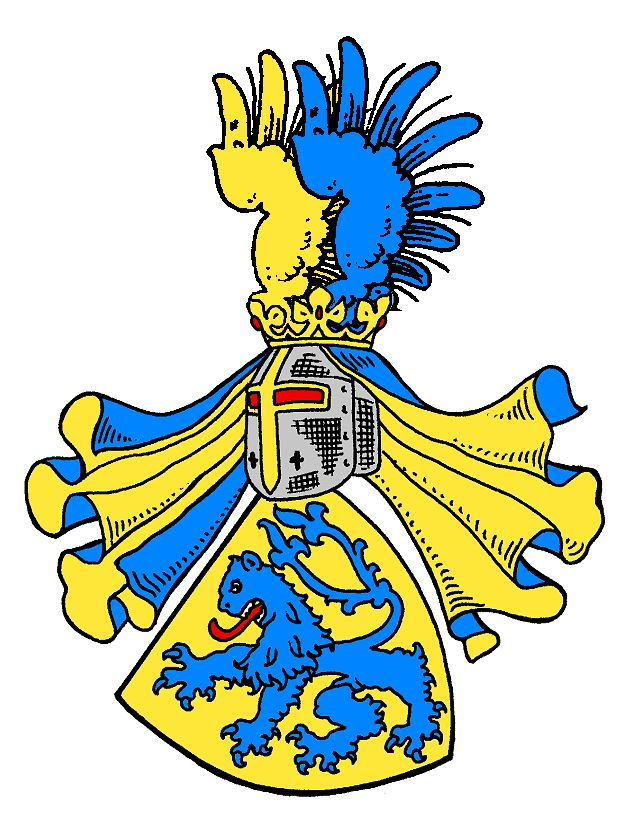
- Coat of arms
- Native name: Vok z Valdštejna
- Noble family: Waldstein family

Wok of Waldstein was a Bohemian noble and a notable figure among the Hussites of Prague.

== Biography ==
In 1410, Archbishop Zbyněk Zajíc of Hazmburk threatened to declare interdict over every scholar who refused to give up their writings of Wycliffe. After the evaluation, the books were deemed heretical and were burned at the archbishop's courtyard. King Wenceslaus IV ordered the archbishop and his subordinates to compensate the book owners. When they refused, the king tasked Wok and Racek Kobyla with confiscating their property. That year, Wok received a congratulatory letter from John Oldcastle after a number of protests resulting from the burning of books written by Wycliffe.

In 1412 Wok was the leader of a crowd that publicly burned papal bulls regarding intercession on the pillory of Prague. In 1415, he protested against the condemnation of Jan Hus by the Council of Constance.
