= Vráž (Ostředek) =

- Village
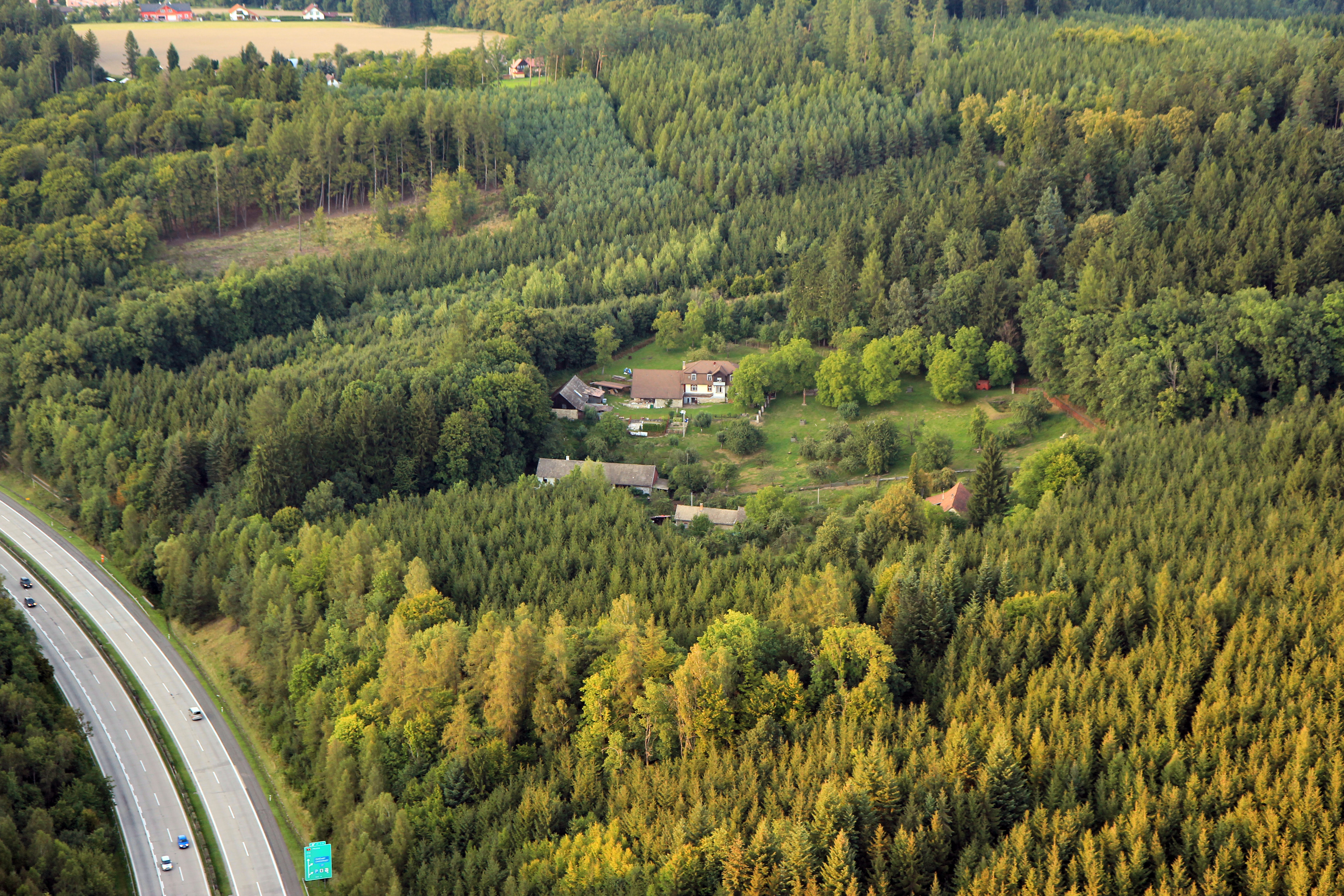
- Aerial view

- Location in the Czech Republic
- Coordinates: 49°51′19″N 14°47′56″E
- Country: Czech Republic
- Region: Central Bohemian
- District: Benešov
- Municipality: Ostředek
- First mentioned: 1406

Area
  - Total: 1.46 km^{2} (0.56 sq mi)
- Elevation: 400 m (1,300 ft)

Population (2021)
  - Total: 1
  - Density: 0.68/km^{2} (1.8/sq mi)
- Time zone: UTC+1 (CET)
  - Summer (DST): UTC+2 (CEST)
- Postal code: 257 24

Vráž is a village and municipal part of Ostředek in Benešov District in the Central Bohemian Region of the Czech Republic. It has 1 inhabitant.

== History ==
The first written mention of the village is from 1406.

== Demographics ==
Historical population
Year	Pop.	±%
1869	58	—
1880	44	−24.1%
1890	37	−15.9%
1900	34	−8.1%
1910	27	−20.6%
1921	15	−44.4%
1930	13	−13.3%
1950	11	−15.4%
1961	12	+9.1%
1970	6	−50.0%
1980	3	−50.0%
1991	0	−100.0%
2001	1	—
2011	1	+0.0%
2021	1	+0.0%
Source: Censuses
