= Chocerady =

- Municipality
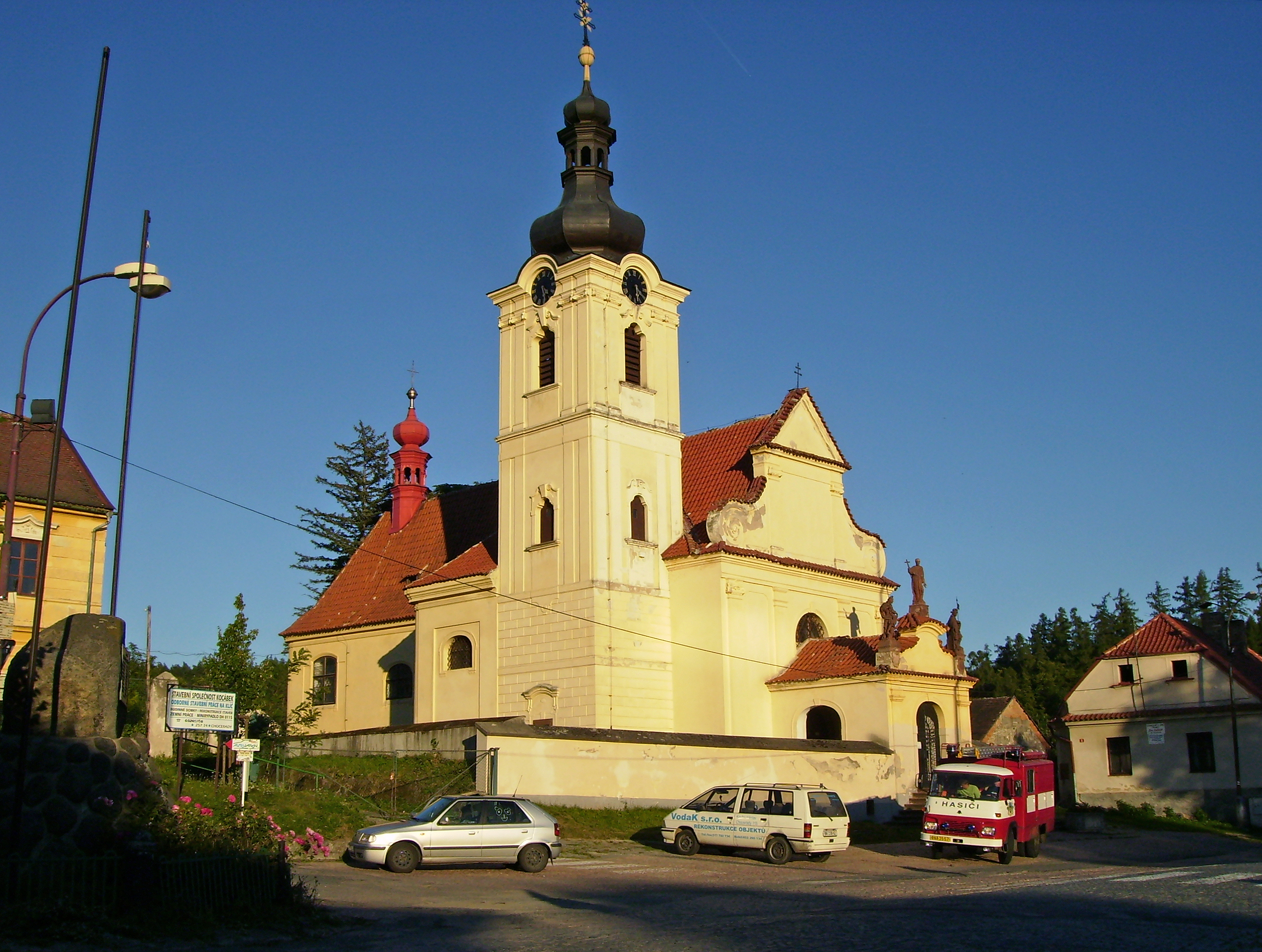
- Church of the Assumption of the Virgin Mary

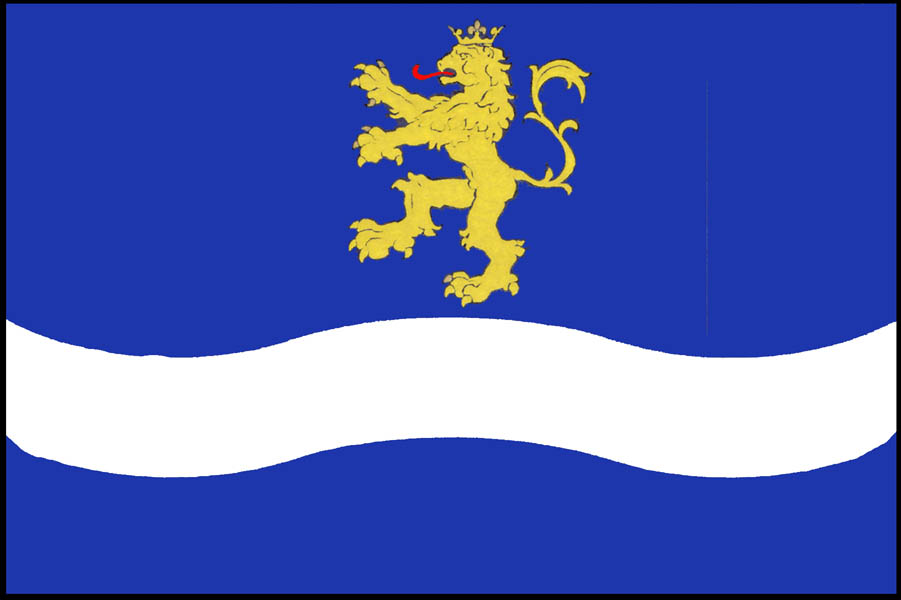
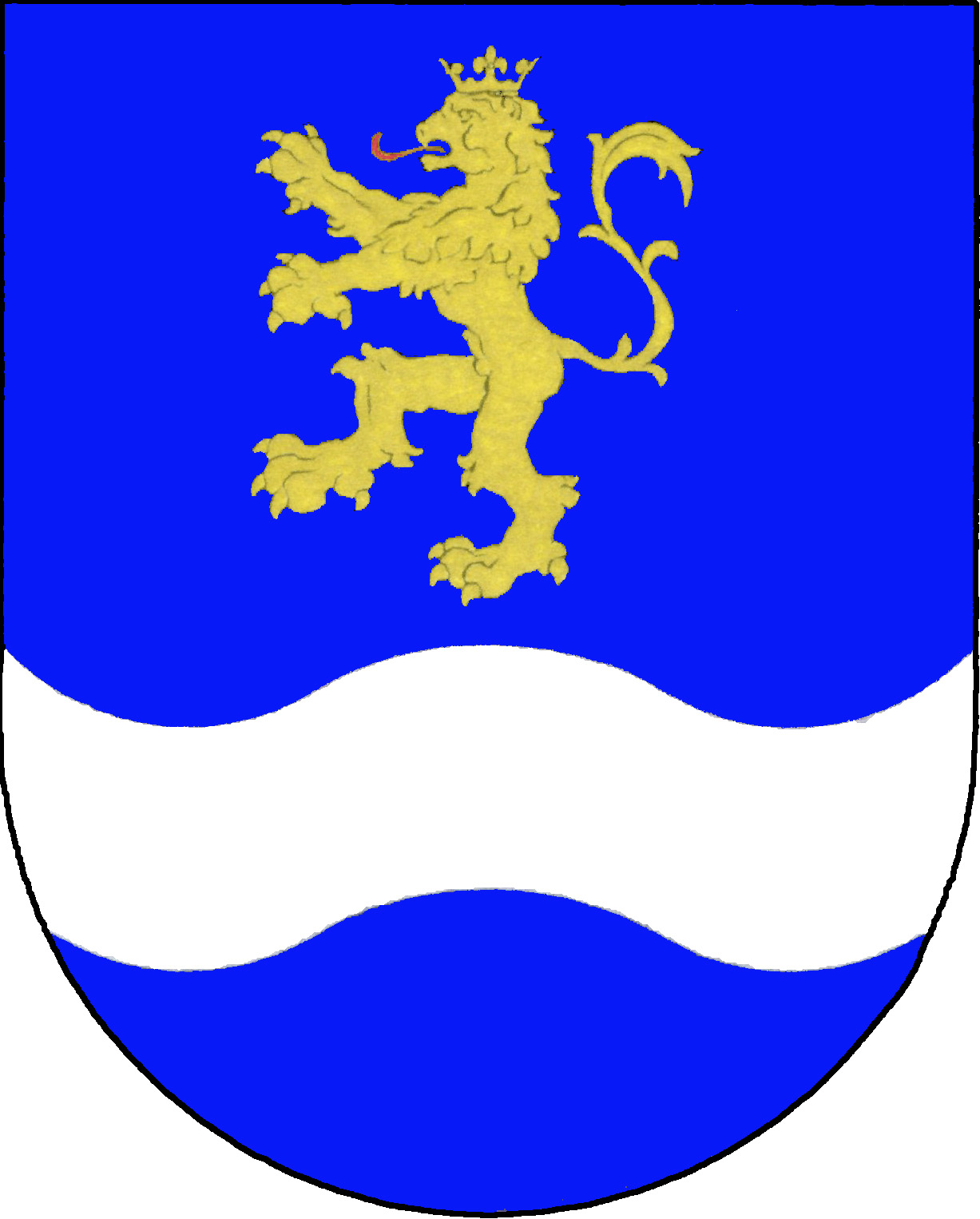
- Flag Coat of arms

- Location in the Czech Republic
- Coordinates: 49°52′23″N 14°48′8″E
- Country: Czech Republic
- Region: Central Bohemian
- District: Benešov
- First mentioned: 1250

Area
  - Total: 17.84 km^{2} (6.89 sq mi)
- Elevation: 284 m (932 ft)

Population (2026-01-01)
  - Total: 1,444
  - Density: 80.94/km^{2} (209.6/sq mi)
- Time zone: UTC+1 (CET)
  - Summer (DST): UTC+2 (CEST)
- Postal code: 257 24
- Website: www.chocerady.cz

Chocerady is a municipality and village in Benešov District in the Central Bohemian Region of the Czech Republic. It has about 1,400 inhabitants.

== Administrative division ==
Chocerady consists of five municipal parts (in brackets population according to the 2021 census):

- Chocerady (863)
- Komorní Hrádek (94)
- Samechov (140)
- Vestec (72)
- Vlkovec (169)

== Etymology ==
The first part of the name Chocerady is derived either from the Czech word choť ('husband', 'wife') or from the old Czech word chotě ('desirably'). The second part of the name is derived from rád ('glad'). Chocerad was the nickname of the people who lived here, but it is not known how it originated.

== Geography ==
Chocerady is located about 12 kilometres (7 mi) northeast of Benešov and 27 km (17 mi) southeast of Prague. It lies in the Benešov Uplands. The highest point is at 482 m (1,581 ft) above sea level. The Sázava River flows through the municipality.

== History ==
The first written mention of Chocerady is from 1250. The Komorní Hrádek Castle was first documented in 1412 and in 1525, it became the administrative centre of the estate. From 1554 to 1773, it was owned by the Waldstein family.

== Demographics ==
Historical population

Year	Pop.	±%
1869	1,446	—
1880	1,341	−7.3%
1890	1,274	−5.0%
1900	1,368	+7.4%
1910	1,150	−15.9%

Year	Pop.	±%
1921	1,220	+6.1%
1930	1,332	+9.2%
1950	1,426	+7.1%
1961	1,424	−0.1%
1970	1,261	−11.4%

Year	Pop.	±%
1980	1,110	−12.0%
1991	938	−15.5%
2001	1,002	+6.8%
2011	1,224	+22.2%
2021	1,338	+9.3%

Source: Censuses

== Transport ==
The D1 motorway from Prague to Brno passes along the western and southern municipal border just outside the municipal territory.

Chocerady is located on the railway line Čerčany–Ledeč nad Sázavou.

== Sights ==
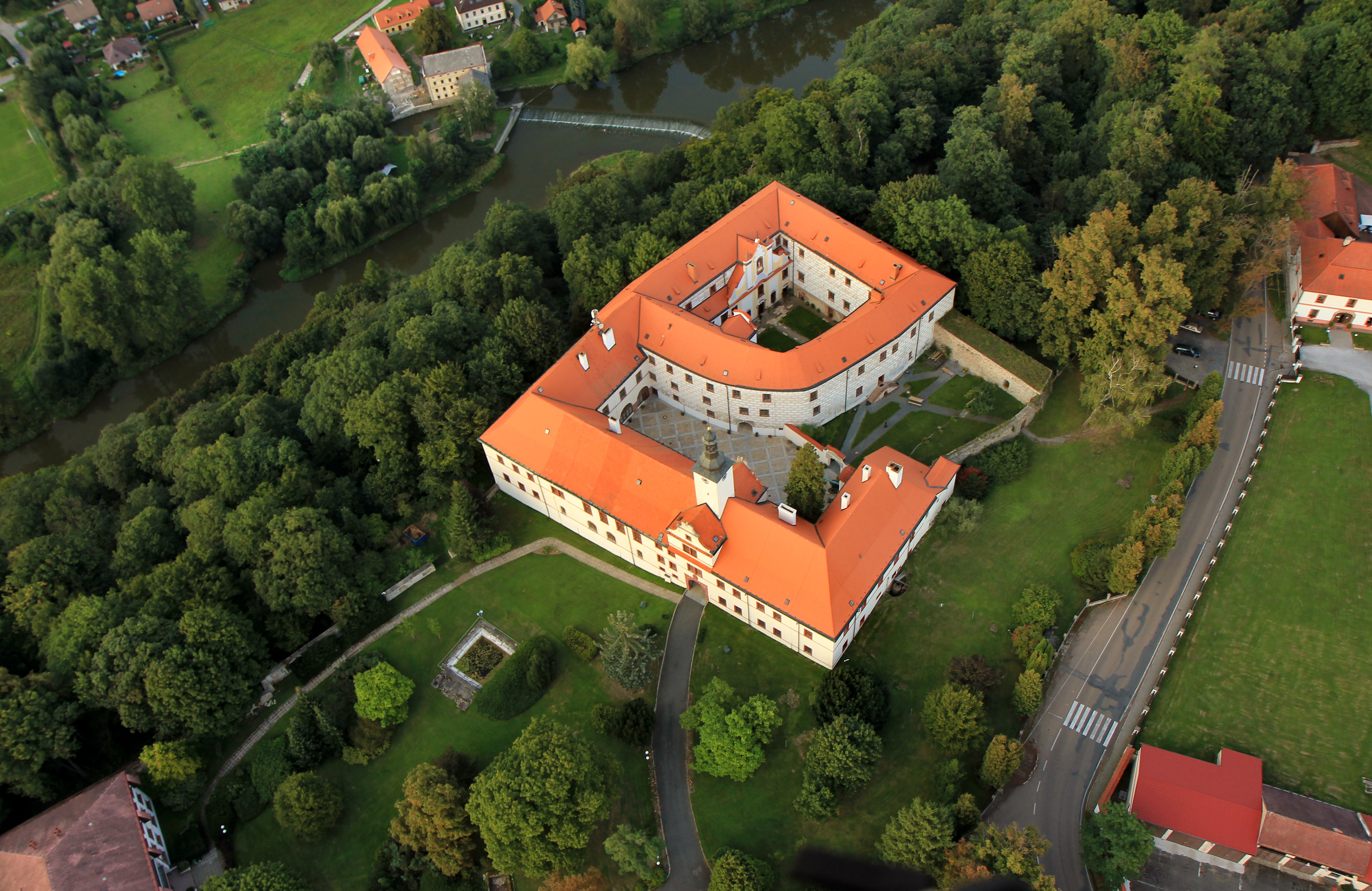
Komorní Lhotka Castle

The main landmark of the centre of Chocerady is the Church of the Assumption of the Virgin Mary. It was a Gothic church from the 14th century, rebuilt in the Renaissance style in the second half of the 16th century, and then in the Baroque style in the early 18th century.

The Komorní Lhotka Castle was an old medieval castle from the 14th century, which was rebuilt and modernized in the Renaissance style during the rule of Jaroslav of Šelmberk between 1525 and 1550, further modifications were made in the 18th century. Today the castle houses the Education and Training Centre of the Ministry of Defense.
