= Vranov (Benešov District) =

- Municipality
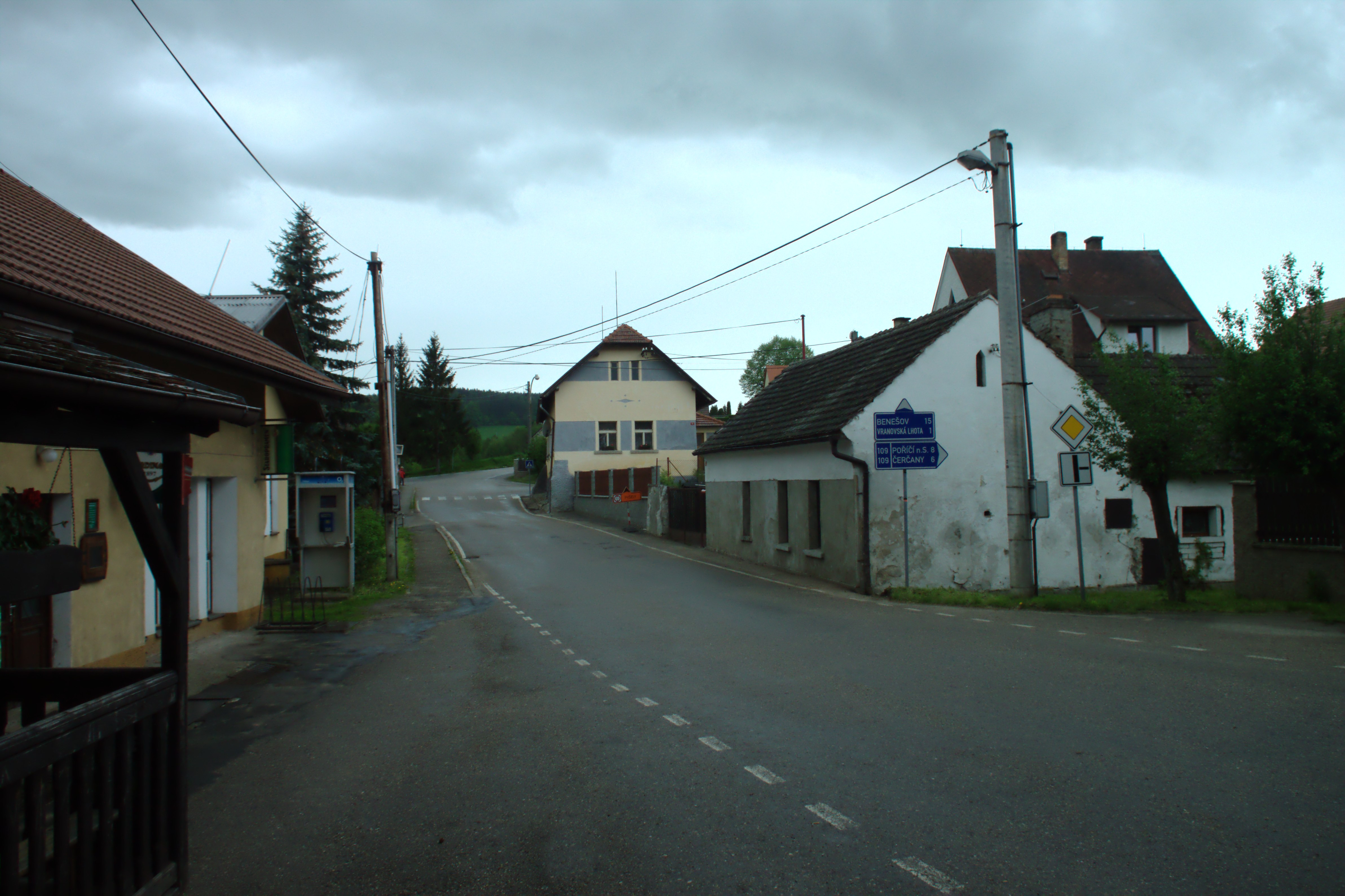
- Main street

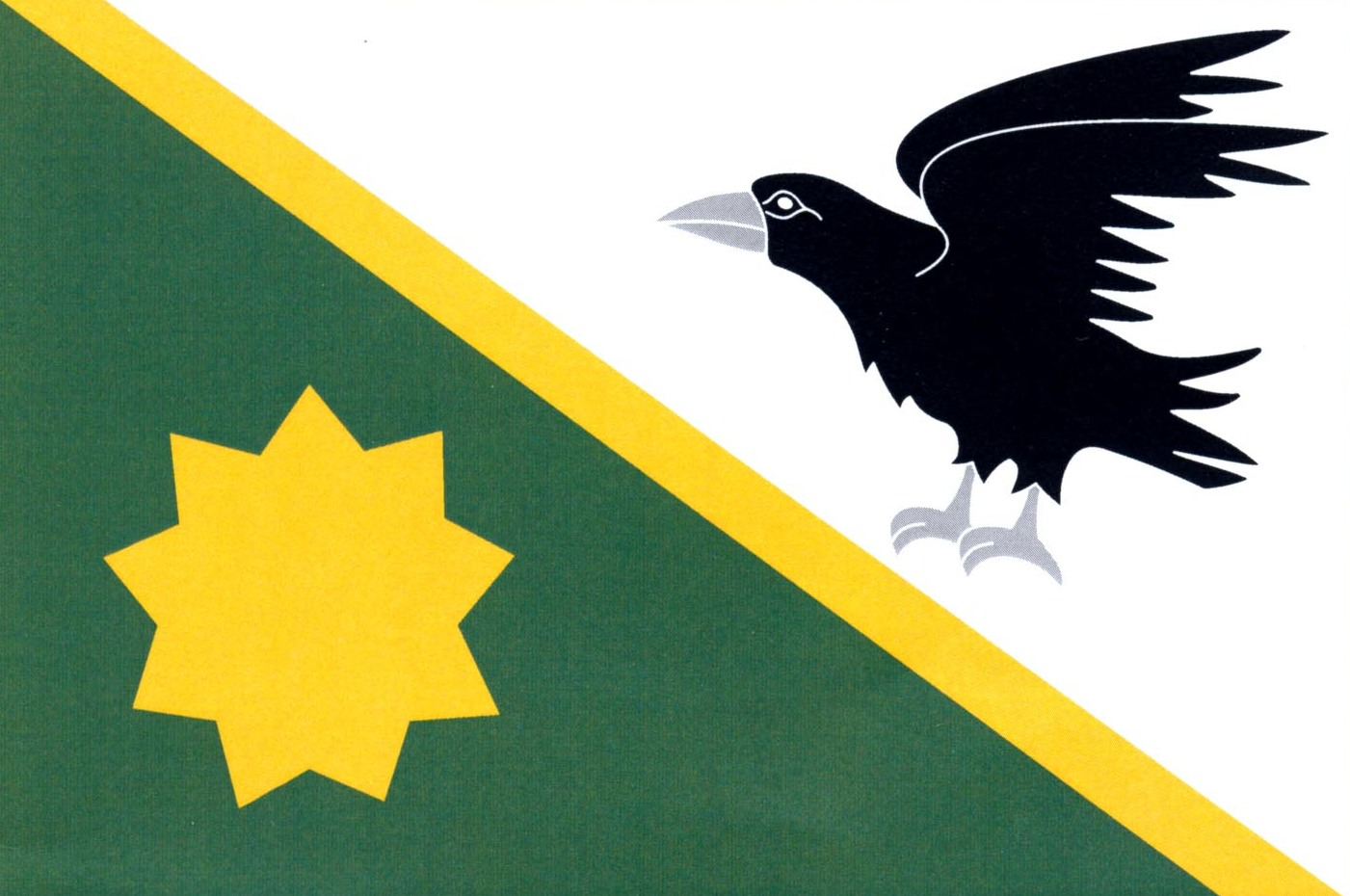
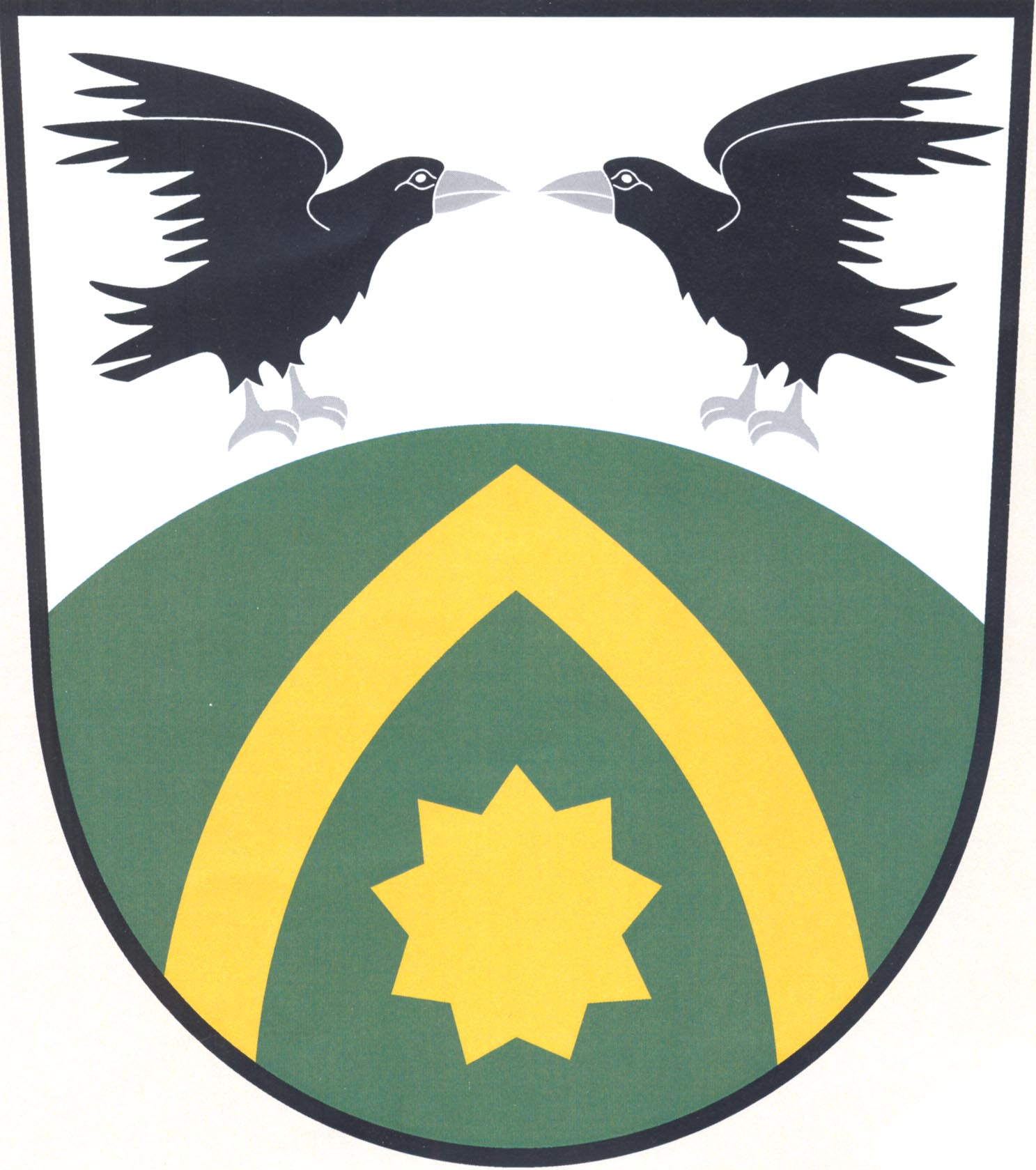
- Flag Coat of arms

- Location in the Czech Republic
- Coordinates: 49°51′12″N 14°46′37″E
- Country: Czech Republic
- Region: Central Bohemian
- District: Benešov
- First mentioned: 1352

Area
  - Total: 9.49 km^{2} (3.66 sq mi)
- Elevation: 356 m (1,168 ft)

Population (2026-01-01)
  - Total: 432
  - Density: 45.5/km^{2} (118/sq mi)
- Time zone: UTC+1 (CET)
  - Summer (DST): UTC+2 (CEST)
- Postal codes: 257 22, 257 24
- Website: chopos.cz/obce/vranov

Vranov is a municipality and village in Benešov District in the Central Bohemian Region of the Czech Republic. It has about 400 inhabitants.

== Administrative division ==
Vranov consists of eight municipal parts (in brackets population according to the 2021 census):

- Vranov (165)
- Bezděkov (81)
- Bučina (11)
- Doubravice 2.díl (2)
- Klokočná (11)
- Mačovice (60)
- Naháč (0)
- Údolnice (12)
- Vranovská Lhota (107)

== Etymology ==
The name is derived from the Czech surname Vraný or Vrána, meaning "Vraný's/Vrána's property".

== Geography ==
Vranov is located about 10 kilometres (6 mi) northeast of Benešov and 27 km (17 mi) southeast of Prague. It lies in the Benešov Uplands. The highest point is the hill Meduná at 500 m (1,600 ft) above sea level. In the municipality is a system of fishponds supplied by the brook Drhlavský potok.

== History ==
The first written mention of Vranov is from 1352, when it was a parish village.

== Demographics ==
Historical population

Year	Pop.	±%
1869	749	—
1880	715	−4.5%
1890	747	+4.5%
1900	690	−7.6%
1910	635	−8.0%

Year	Pop.	±%
1921	574	−9.6%
1930	570	−0.7%
1950	495	−13.2%
1961	467	−5.7%
1970	366	−21.6%

Year	Pop.	±%
1980	327	−10.7%
1991	293	−10.4%
2001	296	+1.0%
2011	377	+27.4%
2021	449	+19.1%

Source: Censuses

== Transport ==
The D1 motorway from Prague to Brno runs through the northeastern part of the municipality.

== Sights ==
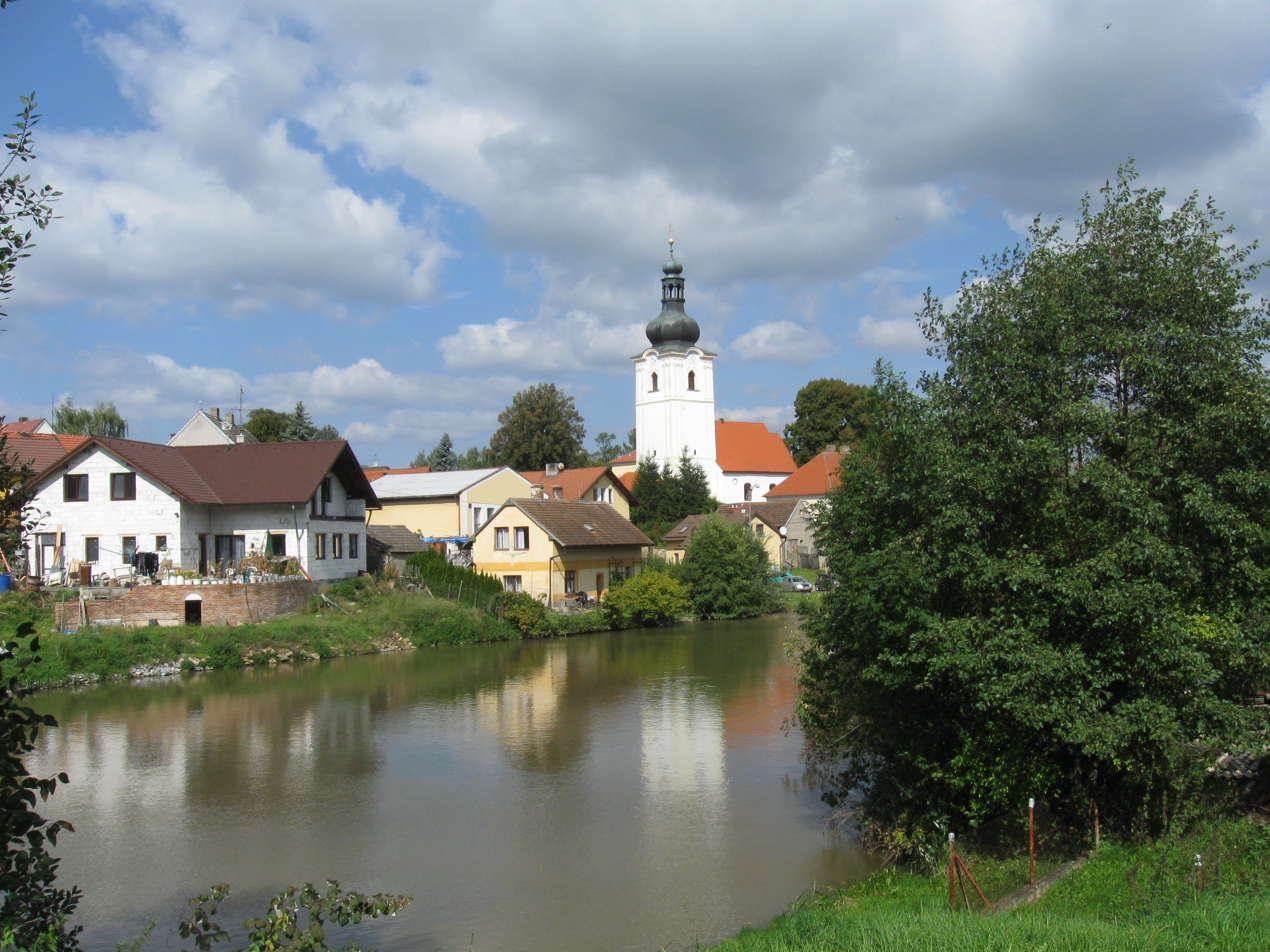
Church of Saint Wenceslaus

The main landmark of Vranov is the Church of Saint Wenceslaus. The most valuable part is the sacristy with an apse, which was preserved from the original pre-Romanesque church from the 11th century. The church was rebuilt in the Baroque style in the 18th century, when the tower added. Neo-Baroque modifications were made in 1905.
