= Treaty of Győr (1386) =

The Treaty of Győr (also known as the Treaty of Raab) was concluded between the Hungarian queen dowager and regent, Elizabeth of Bosnia, and Sigismund of Luxembourg in Győr in April 1386.

Sigismund married Elizabeth's daughter Mary, Queen of Hungary, in 1385, but was unable to immediately assert his jure uxoris right to the crown of Hungary due to King Charles III of Naples's invasion. In April 1386, Sigismund's brother Wenceslaus IV of Bohemia and the large Bohemian army escorted Sigismund to Hungary. Elizabeth was then compelled to sign the treaty by which Sigismund was recognized as Mary's future co-ruler. Pending his coronation, Sigismund was granted the lands once held by Mary's uncle Stephen, Duke of Slavonia, namely Croatia, Dalmatia and Slavonia. Sigismund's Luxembourg cousins, Jobst and Prokop, were permitted to keep Pressburg and the castles between Morava and Váh.
