= Sigismund, Holy Roman Emperor =

King of Hungary (1387–1437); Holy Roman Emperor (1433–1437)

Sigismund
- Imperator Romanorum
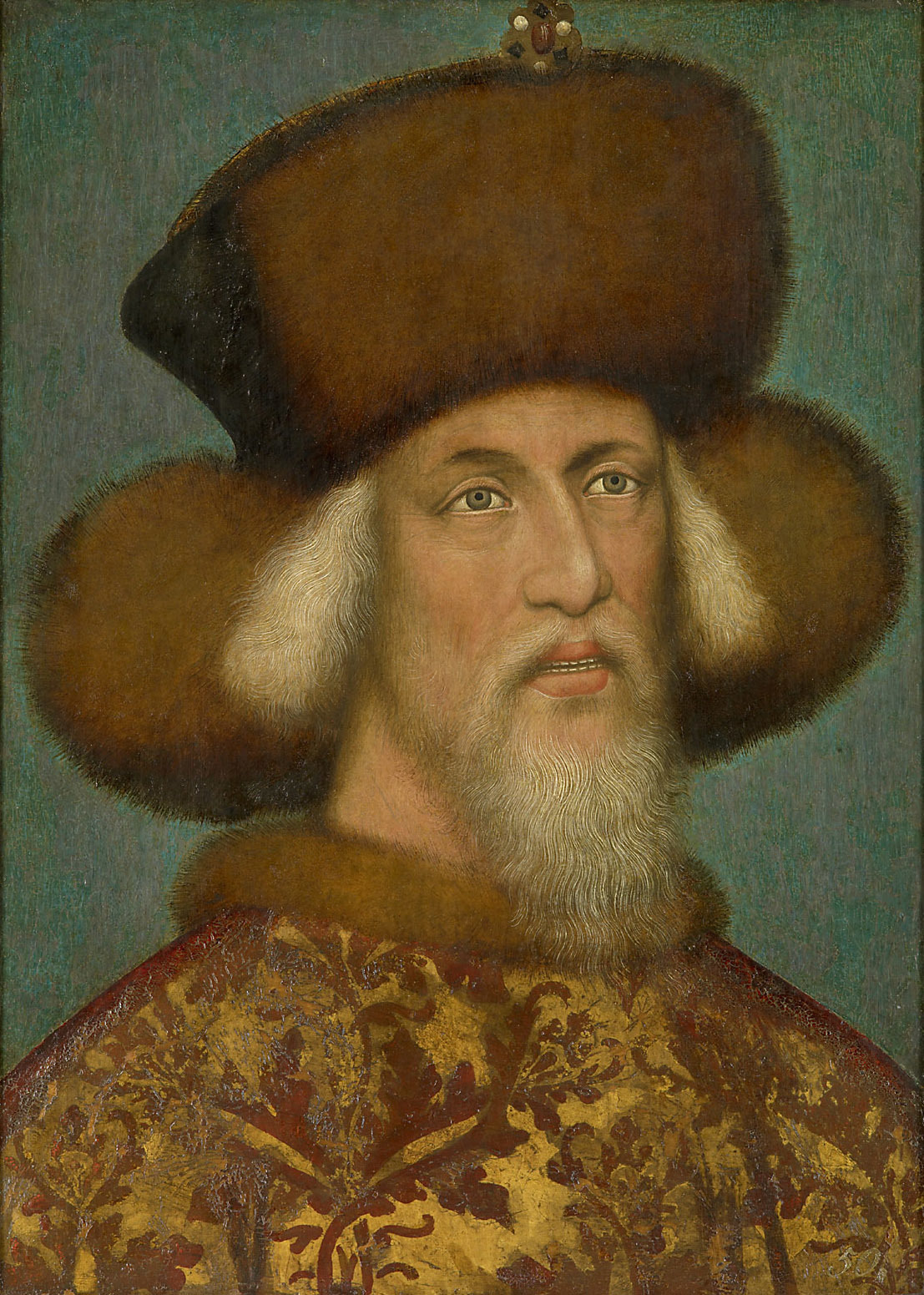
- Portrait of Sigismund of Luxemburg attributed to Pisanello, c. 1433

King of Hungary and Croatia
- Reign: 1387–1437
- Coronation: 31 March 1387, Székesfehérvár
- Predecessor: Mary
- Successor: Albert
- Co-ruler: Mary (1387–1395)

King of the Romans King of Germany
- Reign: 1410–1437
- Coronation: 8 November 1414, Aachen
- Predecessor: Rupert
- Successor: Albert II
- Contender: Jobst of Moravia (1410–1411)

King of Bohemia
- Reign: 1419–1437
- Coronation: 27 July 1420, Prague
- Predecessor: Wenceslaus IV
- Successor: Albert

Holy Roman Emperor
- Reign: 1433–1437
- Coronation: 31 May 1433, Rome
- Predecessor: Charles IV
- Successor: Frederick III
- Born: 14 or 15 February 1368; Prague or Free Imperial City of Nuremberg
- Died: 9 December 1437 (aged 69); Znojmo, Kingdom of Bohemia
- Burial: Nagyvárad, Kingdom of Hungary (today Oradea, Romania)
- Spouses: Mary, Queen of Hungary (m. 1385; died 1395) Barbara of Cilli (m. 1405)
- Issue: Unnamed son; Elizabeth of Luxembourg
- House: Luxembourg
- Father: Charles IV, Holy Roman Emperor
- Mother: Elizabeth of Pomerania

Sigismund of Luxembourg (Note: Luxembourgish: Sigismund vu Lëtzebuerg; French: Sigismond de Luxembourg; German: Sigismund von Luxemburg; Hungarian: Luxemburgi Zsigmond; Croatian: Žigmund Luksemburški; Czech: Zikmund Lucemburský; Dutch: Sigismund van Luxemburg; Italian: Sigismondo di Lussemburgo; Slovene: Sigismund Luksemburški; Romanian: Sigismund de Luxemburg; Slovak: Žigmund Luxemburský) (14 February or 15 February 1368 – 9 December 1437) was Holy Roman Emperor from 1433 until his death in 1437. As the husband of Mary, Queen of Hungary, he was King of Hungary and Croatia (jure uxoris) from 1387. He was elected King of Germany (King of the Romans) in 1410, and was also King of Bohemia from 1419, as well as prince-elector of Brandenburg (1378–88 and 1411–15). He was the last male member of the House of Luxembourg.

Sigismund was the son of Charles IV, Holy Roman Emperor and his fourth wife Elizabeth of Pomerania. He married Mary, Queen of Hungary in 1385 and was crowned King of Hungary soon after. He fought to restore and maintain authority to the throne. Mary died in 1395, leaving Sigismund the sole ruler of Hungary.

In 1396, Sigismund led the Crusade of Nicopolis but was decisively defeated by the Ottoman Empire. Afterwards, he founded the Order of the Dragon to fight the Turks and secured the thrones of Croatia, Germany and Bohemia. To enforce his authority against domestic resistance during his 1403 offensive against Bohemian loyalists supporting King Wenceslaus IV, Sigismund deployed foreign mercenary forces, including Cumans. Utilizing scorched-earth tactics against civilian populations, his armies systematically plundered and burned vital economic hubs around Kutná Hora, leaving widespread devastation across the region. Sigismund was one of the driving forces behind the Council of Constance (1414–18) that ended the Papal Schism, but which also led to the Hussite Wars that dominated the later period of his life. In 1433, Sigismund was crowned Holy Roman Emperor and ruled until his death in 1437.

Historian Thomas Brady Jr. remarks that Sigismund "possessed a breadth of vision and a sense of grandeur unseen in a German monarch since the thirteenth century". He realised the need to carry out reforms of the empire and the Church at the same time. However, external difficulties, self-inflicted mistakes and the extinction of the Luxembourg male line made this vision unfulfilled. Later, the Habsburgs would inherit this mission and imperial reform was carried out successfully under the reigns of Frederick III and especially his son Maximilian I, although perhaps at the expense of the reform of the Church, partly because Maximilian was not particularly focused on the matter.

In recent years, scholarly interest (especially from East-Central Europe) has grown greatly in the person and reign of Sigismund – the ruler who had gained and led an imperial association almost reaching the size of the later Habsburg Empire – as well as cultural developments associated with his era. The setbacks which have been seen as his major failures (like dealing with the Hussite movement) are now generally considered to be the result of the lack of financial resources and other heavy constraints, rather than personal failings.

== Biography ==
=== Place and date of birth ===
Sigismund's place and exact date of birth are disputed in historiography. A letter written by his mother, Elizabeth of Pomerania, on 16 February 1368 states that she had given birth to a son on the Monday following Exsurge Sunday, at about seven o'clock in the evening, corresponding to 14 February 1368. The letter was issued in Prague, although it does not explicitly state that the birth itself took place there.

This is consistent with the account of Theodor Hirsch, who wrote in 1878 that his father, Charles IV, then staying in Nuremberg, received news of his son's birth from Prague and subsequently travelled there to see the newborn son. A different interpretation was advanced by Theodor Lindner in 1892, who gave 15 February as his date of birth and considered Nuremberg the probable birthplace because Charles arranged Sigismund's betrothal there only a few days after his birth. Lindner's inference was subsequently widely repeated as a definite birthplace in German-language reference works, while other modern Czech sources give Prague and 14 February.

=== Early life ===
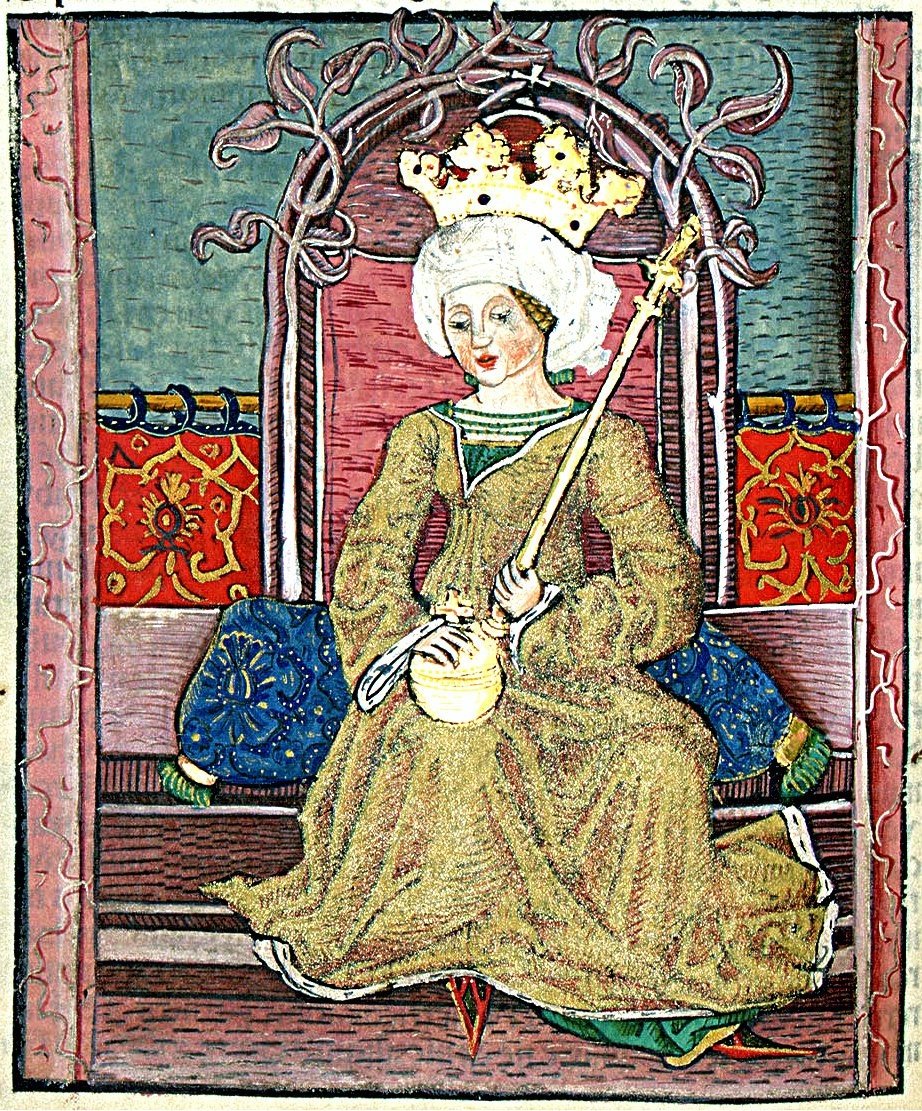
Sigismund's first wife, Mary, Queen of Hungary, Chronica Hungarorum, 1488

Sigismund was the son of Charles IV, Holy Roman Emperor and his fourth and final wife, Elizabeth of Pomerania, who was the granddaughter of King Casimir III of Poland and the great-granddaughter of Gediminas, a Grand Duke of Lithuania. He was named after Saint Sigismund of Burgundy, the favourite saint of Sigismund's father. From Sigismund's childhood, he was nicknamed the "ginger fox" (liška ryšavá) in the Bohemian Crown lands on account of his hair colour.

King Louis I of Hungary always had a good and close relationship with Emperor Charles IV, and Sigismund was betrothed to Louis's eldest daughter, Mary, in 1374, when he was six years old and Mary but an infant. The marital project aimed to augment the lands held by the House of Luxembourg. Upon his father's death in 1378, young Sigismund became Margrave of Brandenburg and was sent to the Hungarian court, where he soon learned the Hungarian language and way of life, and became entirely devoted to his adopted country. King Louis named him as his heir and appointed him his successor as King of Hungary.

In 1381, the then 13-year-old Sigismund was sent to Kraków by his eldest half-brother and guardian Wenceslaus IV of Bohemia, to learn Polish and to become acquainted with the land and its people. King Wenceslaus also gave him Neumark to facilitate communication between Brandenburg and Poland.

While Mary was accepted as monarch of Hungary, Sigismund vied for the crown of Poland as well. However, the Poles were unwilling to submit to a German sovereign, nor did they want to be tied to Hungary. The disagreement between Polish landlords of Lesser Poland on one side and landlords of Greater Poland on the other, regarding the choice of the future monarch of Poland, finally ended in choosing the Lithuanian side. The support of the lords of Greater Poland was, however, not enough to give Prince Sigismund the Polish crown. Instead, the landlords of Lesser Poland gave it to Mary's younger sister Jadwiga, who married Jogaila of Lithuania.

=== King of Hungary ===
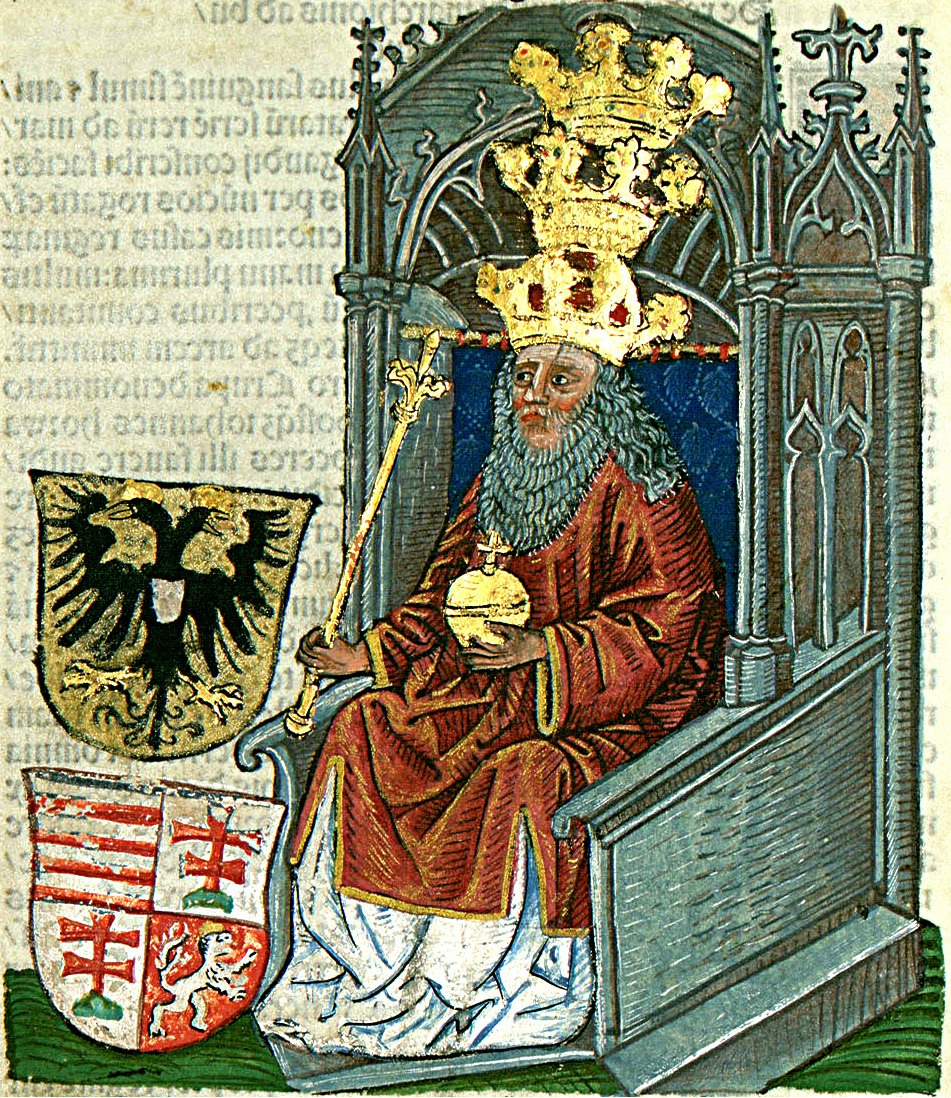
King Sigismund of Hungary, Chronica Hungarorum, 1488

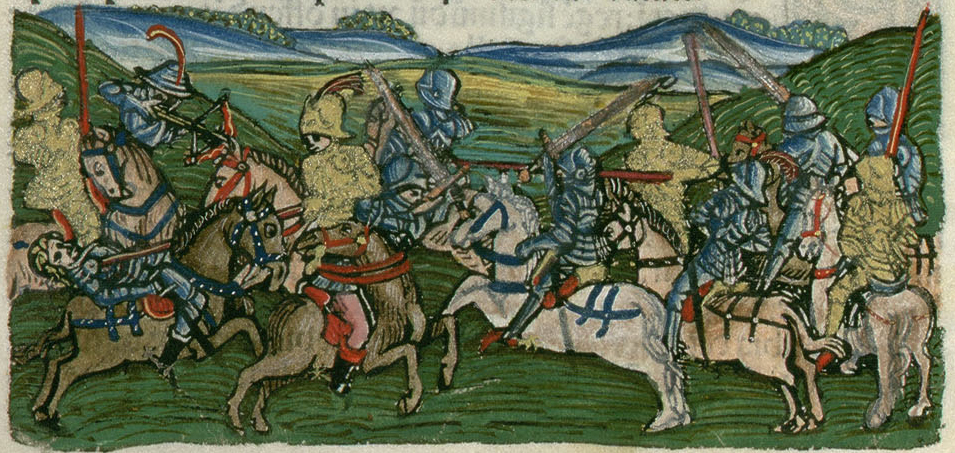
Campaign of King Sigismund of Hungary against the rebellious House of Horvat in 1387, Chronica Hungarorum, 1488

On the death of her father in 1382, his betrothed, Mary, became queen of Hungary and Sigismund married her in 1385 in Zólyom (today Zvolen). The next year, he was accepted as Mary's future co-ruler by the Treaty of Győr. However, Mary was captured, together with her mother, Elizabeth of Bosnia, who had acted as regent, in 1387 by the rebellious House of Horvat, Bishop Paul Horvat of Mačva, his brother John Horvat and younger brother Ladislav. Sigismund's mother-in-law was strangled, while Mary was liberated.

Having secured the support of the nobility, Sigismund was crowned King of Hungary at Székesfehérvár on 31 March 1387. Having raised money by pledging Margraviate of Brandenburg to his cousin Jobst of Moravia (1388), he was engaged for the next nine years in a ceaseless struggle for the possession of this unstable throne. The central power was finally weakened to such an extent that only Sigismund's alliance with the powerful Czillei-Garai League could ensure his position on the throne. It was not for entirely selfless reasons that one of the leagues of barons helped him to power: Sigismund had to pay for the support of the lords by transferring a sizeable part of the royal properties. (For some years, the baron's council governed the country in the name of the Holy Crown). The restoration of the authority of the central administration took decades of work. The bulk of the nation headed by the House of Garai was with him; but in the southern provinces between the Sava and the Drava, the Horvathys with the support of King Tvrtko I of Bosnia, Mary's maternal uncle, proclaimed as their king Ladislaus of Naples, son of the murdered Charles II of Hungary. Not until 1395 did Nicholas II Garai succeed in suppressing them. Mary died heavily pregnant in 1395.

To ease the pressure from Hungarian nobles, Sigismund tried to employ foreign advisors, which was not popular, and he had to promise not to give land and nominations to anyone other than Hungarian nobles. However, this was not applied to Stibor of Stiboricz, who was Sigismund's closest friend and advisor. On a number of occasions, Sigismund was imprisoned by nobles, but with the help of the armies of Garai and Stibor of Stiboricz, he was able to regain power.

==== Crusade of Nicopolis ====
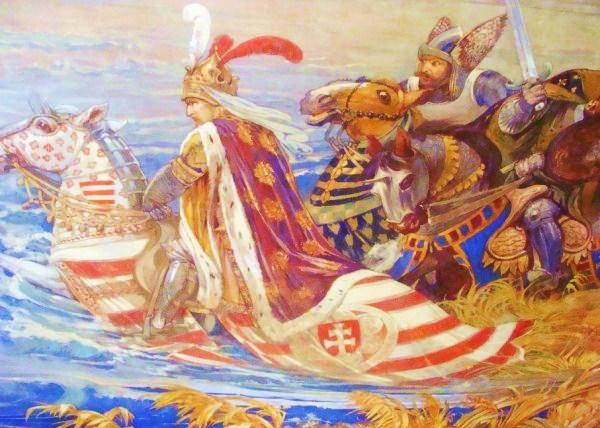
King Sigismund of Hungary during the battle of Nicopolis in 1396. Painting by Ferenc Lohr (1896), main hall of the Castle of Vaja.

Royal Standard of Hungary under the rule of Sigismund (1387–1437).

In 1396, Sigismund led the combined armies of Christendom against the Turks, who had taken advantage of the temporary helplessness of Hungary to extend their dominion to the banks of the Danube. This crusade, preached by Pope Boniface IX, was very popular in Hungary. The nobles flocked in their thousands to the royal standard and were reinforced by volunteers from nearly every part of Europe, the most important contingent being that of the French led by John the Fearless, son of Philip II, Duke of Burgundy. Sigismund set out with 15,000 men and a flotilla of 70 galleys. After capturing Vidin, he camped with his Hungarian armies before the fortress of Nicopolis. Sultan Bayezid I raised the siege of Constantinople and, at the head of 10,000 men, completely defeated the Christian forces in the Battle of Nicopolis fought between the 25 and 28 September 1396. Sigismund returned by sea and through the realm of Zeta, where he ordained the local Montenegrin lord Đurađ II with the islands of Hvar and Korčula for resistance against the Turks; the islands were returned to Sigismund after Đurađ's death in April 1403.

Gold coin of Sigismund of Hungary with his coat of arms (right), and the image of the King Saint Ladislaus I of Hungary (left).

The disaster at Nicopolis angered several Hungarian lords, leading to instability in the kingdom. Deprived of his authority in Hungary, Sigismund then turned his attention to securing the succession in Kingdom of Germany and Kingdom of Bohemia, and was recognized by his childless half-brother Wenceslaus IV of Bohemia as Vicar-General of the whole empire. However, he was unable to support Wenceslaus when he was deposed in 1400, and Rupert of Germany, Elector Palatine, was elected King of Germany in his stead.

==== Return to Hungary ====
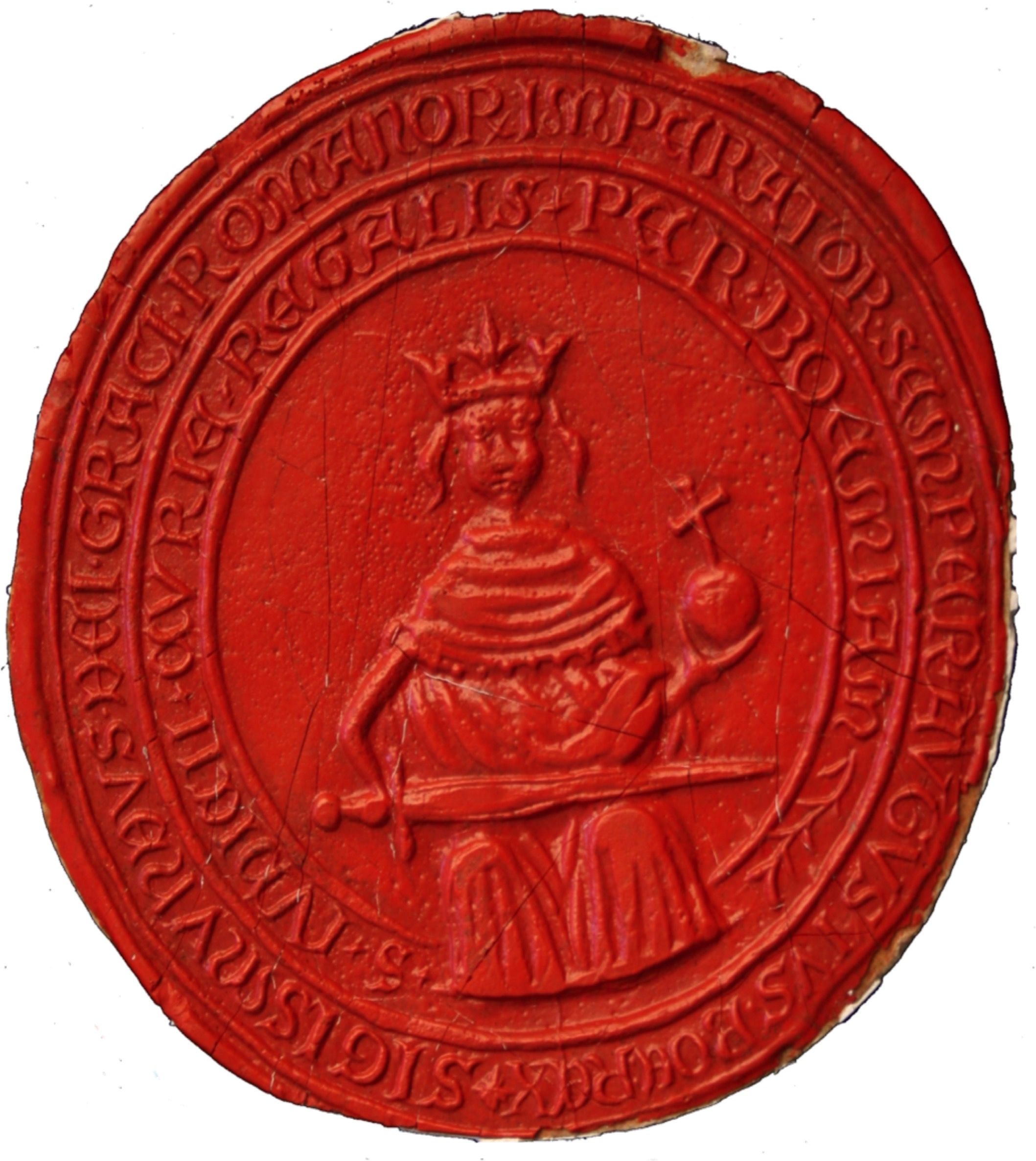
Sigismund of Luxembourg, official imprint.

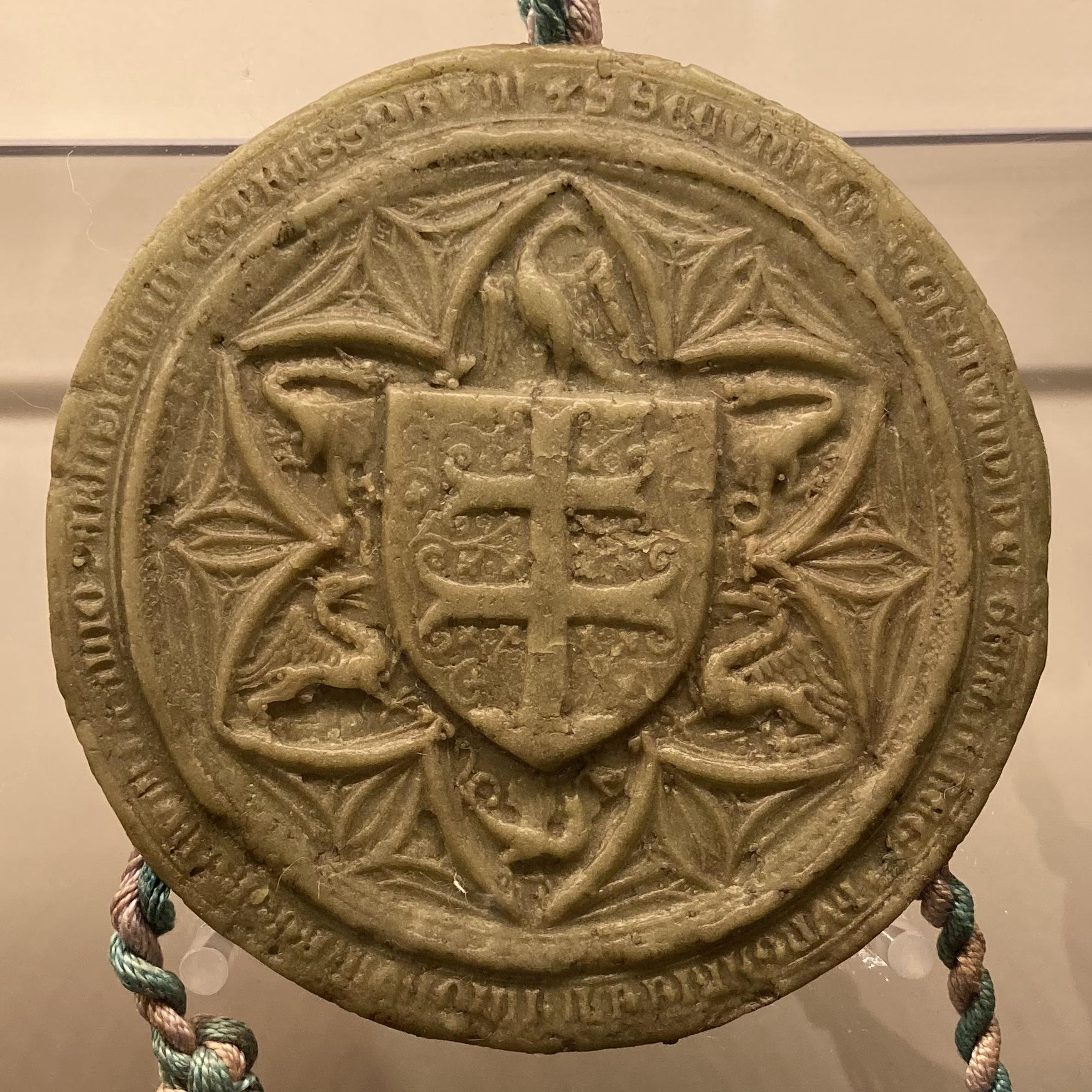
Reverse of the first double seal (1387–1405) of King Sigismund of Hungary

On his return to Hungary in 1401, Sigismund was imprisoned once and deposed twice. That year, he aided an uprising against Wenceslaus IV, during the course of which the Bohemian king was taken prisoner, and Sigismund ruled Bohemia for nineteen months. He released Wenceslaus in 1403. In the meantime, a group of Hungarian noblemen swore loyalty to the last Anjou monarch, Ladislaus of Naples, putting their hands on the relic of Saint Ladislas of Hungary in Nagyvárad (today Oradea). Ladislaus was the son of the murdered Charles II of Hungary, and thus a distant relative of the long-dead King Louis I of Hungary. Ladislaus captured Zara (today Zadar) in 1403, but soon stopped any military advance. This struggle in turn led to a war with the Republic of Venice, as Ladislaus had sold the Dalmatian cities to the Venetians for 100,000 ducats before leaving for his own land. In the following years, Sigismund acted indirectly to thwart Ladislaus' attempts to conquer central Italy by allying with the Italian cities resisting him and by applying diplomatic pressure on him.

Due to his frequent absences attending to business in the other countries over which he ruled, he was obliged to consult Diets in Hungary with more frequency than his predecessors and institute the office of Palatine as chief administrator while he was away. In 1404, Sigismund introduced the Placetum Regium. According to this decree, Papal bulls could not be pronounced in Hungary without the consent of the king. During his long reign, the royal Buda Castle became probably the largest Gothic palace of the Late Middle Ages.

==== Crusade against Bosnia ====
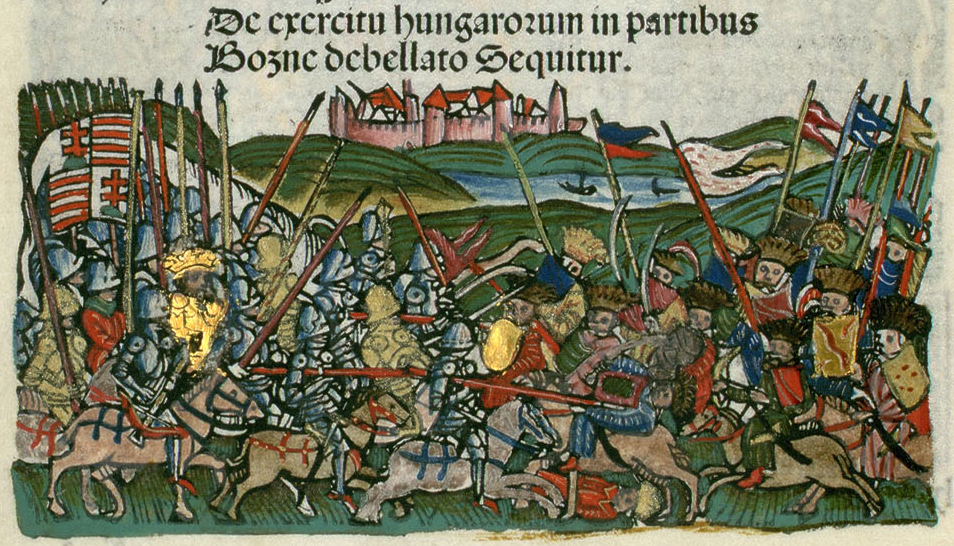
The campaign of Hungarians against Bosnia during the reign of King Sigismund of Hungary, Chronica Hungarorum, 1488

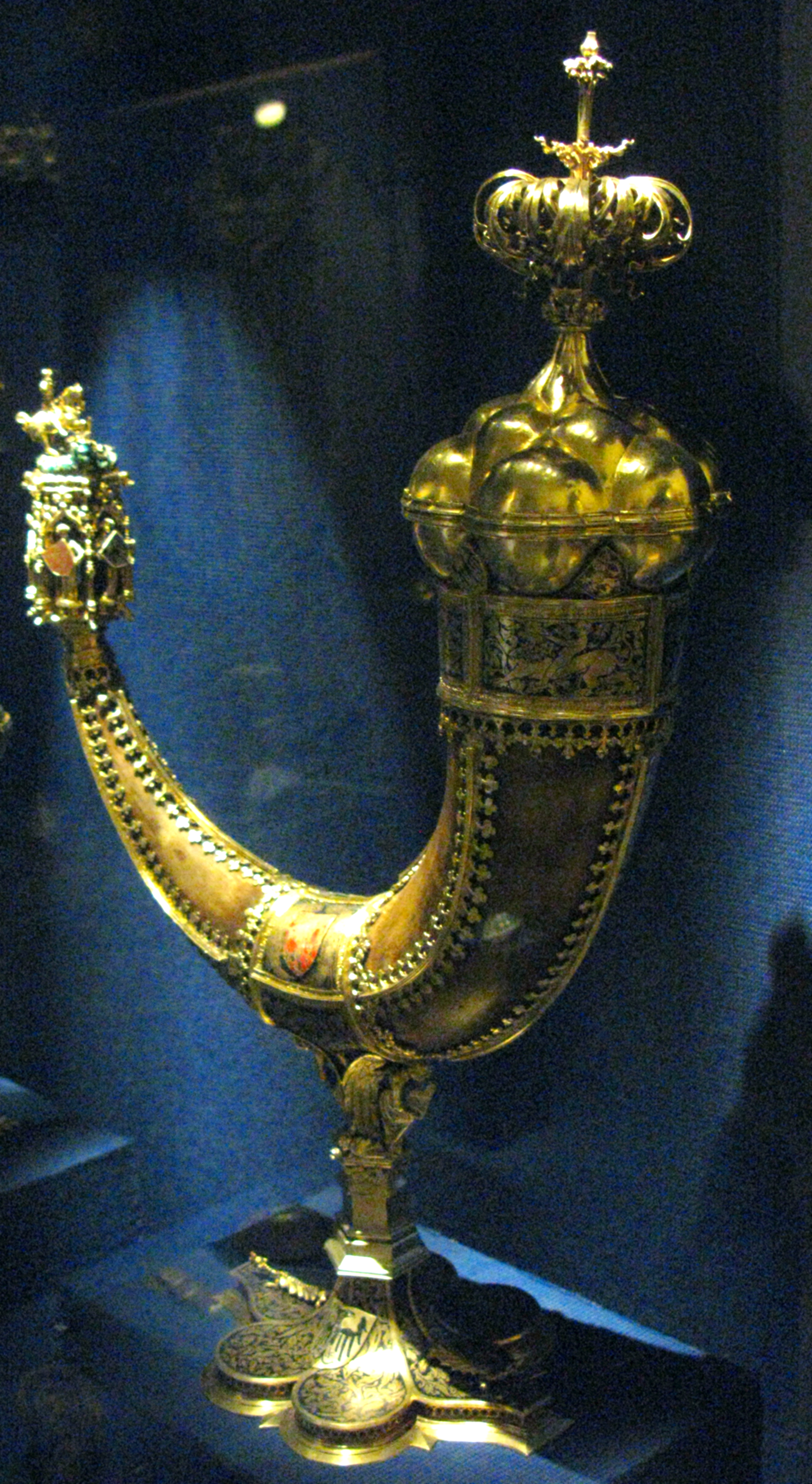
Drinking horn of Sigismund of Luxembourg, before 1408

In about 1406, Sigismund married Mary's cousin Barbara of Cilli, daughter of Hermann II, Count of Celje. Hermann's mother Catherine of Bosnia, Countess of Cilli (of the House of Kotromanic) and Mary's mother Queen Elisabeth of Bosnia were sisters, or at least cousins who were adoptive sisters.

Sigismund managed to establish control in Slavonia. He did not hesitate to use violent methods (see Bloody Sabor of Križevci), but from the River Sava to the south, his control was weak. Sigismund personally led an army of almost 50,000 "crusaders" against the Bosnians, culminating with the Battle of Dobor in 1408, a massacre of about 200 members of various Bosnian noble families. However, although the campaign militarily looked like a success, it ultimately failed politically and Hungarians retreated, while the Bosnian crown slowly but surely slipped away out of the reach for Sigismund and Hungarians.

==== Possessions in Serbia ====
Threatened by Ottoman expansion, King Sigismund managed to strengthen the security of southern Hungarian borders by entering into a defensive alliance with Despot Stefan Lazarević of Serbia. In 1403, Hungarian possessions in northwestern regions of Serbia (the city of Belgrade and the Banate of Macsó) were given to Despot Stefan, who pledged his allegiance to King Sigismund, remaining the king's loyal vassal until death in 1427. Stefan's successor, Đurađ Branković of Serbia, also pledged his allegiance to Sigismund, returning Belgrade to the king. By maintaining close relations with Serbian rulers, Sigismund succeeded in securing the southern borders of his realm.

==== Order of the Dragon ====
Sigismund founded his personal order of knights, the Order of the Dragon, after the victory at Dobor. The main goal of the order was fighting the Ottoman Empire. Members of the order were mostly his political allies and supporters. The main members of the order were Sigismund's close allies Stefan Lazarević, Nicholas II Garay, Hermann II, Count of Celje, Stibor of Stiboricz, and Pippo Spano. The most important European monarchs became members of the order. He encouraged international trade by abolishing internal duties, regulating tariffs on foreign goods and standardising weights and measures throughout the country.

=== King of the Romans ===
After the death of King Rupert of Germany in 1410, Sigismund – ignoring the claims of his half-brother Wenceslaus – was elected as successor by three of the electors on 20 September 1410, but he was opposed by his cousin Jobst of Moravia, who was elected by four electors in a different election on 1 October. Jobst's death on 18 January 1411 removed this conflict and Sigismund was again elected king on 21 July 1411. His coronation was deferred until 8 November 1414, when it took place at Aachen.

=== Anti-Polish alliances ===
On a number of occasions, and in 1410 in particular, Sigismund allied himself with the Teutonic Knights against Władysław II Jagiełło of Poland. In return for 300,000 ducats, he would attack Poland from the south after the truce on St. John's Day, 24 June, expired. Sigismund ordered his most loyal friend Stibor of Stiboricz to set up the attack on Poland. Stibor of Stiboricz was of Polish origin and from the main line of the powerful Clan of Ostoja that had also been against choosing Jogaila as King of Poland. With the support of Sigismund, Stibor became one of the most influential men in late medieval Europe, holding titles as Duke of Transylvania and owning about 25% of modern-day Slovakia, including 31 castles of which 15 were situated around the 406 km long Váh river with surrounding land that was given to him by Sigismund. In the diplomatic struggle to prevent war between Poland-Lithuania, which was supported by the Muscovites, and the Teutonic Knights, Sigismund used Stibor's fine diplomacy to gain financially. The Polish side appointed several negotiators and most of them were also from the Clan of Ostoja, distant relations of the Stibors. However, those "family meetings" could not prevent the war and an alliance of twenty-two Western states formed an army against Poland in the Battle of Grunwald in July 1410. Stibor attacked then Nowy Sącz and burned it to the ground, but after that, he returned with his army to the Beckov Castle. After the Polish-Lithuanian victory in the Battle of Grunwald, the Teutonic Knights had to pay a huge sum of silver to Poland as reparation and again, through the diplomacy of his friend Stibor, Sigismund was able to borrow all this silver from King Władysław II of Poland on good conditions. In light of facts about the diplomatic work of Stibor and the Clan of Ostoja that followed the politics of King Sigismund, one can question whether Sigismund actually joined the anti-Polish alliance.

=== Conference in Buda ===
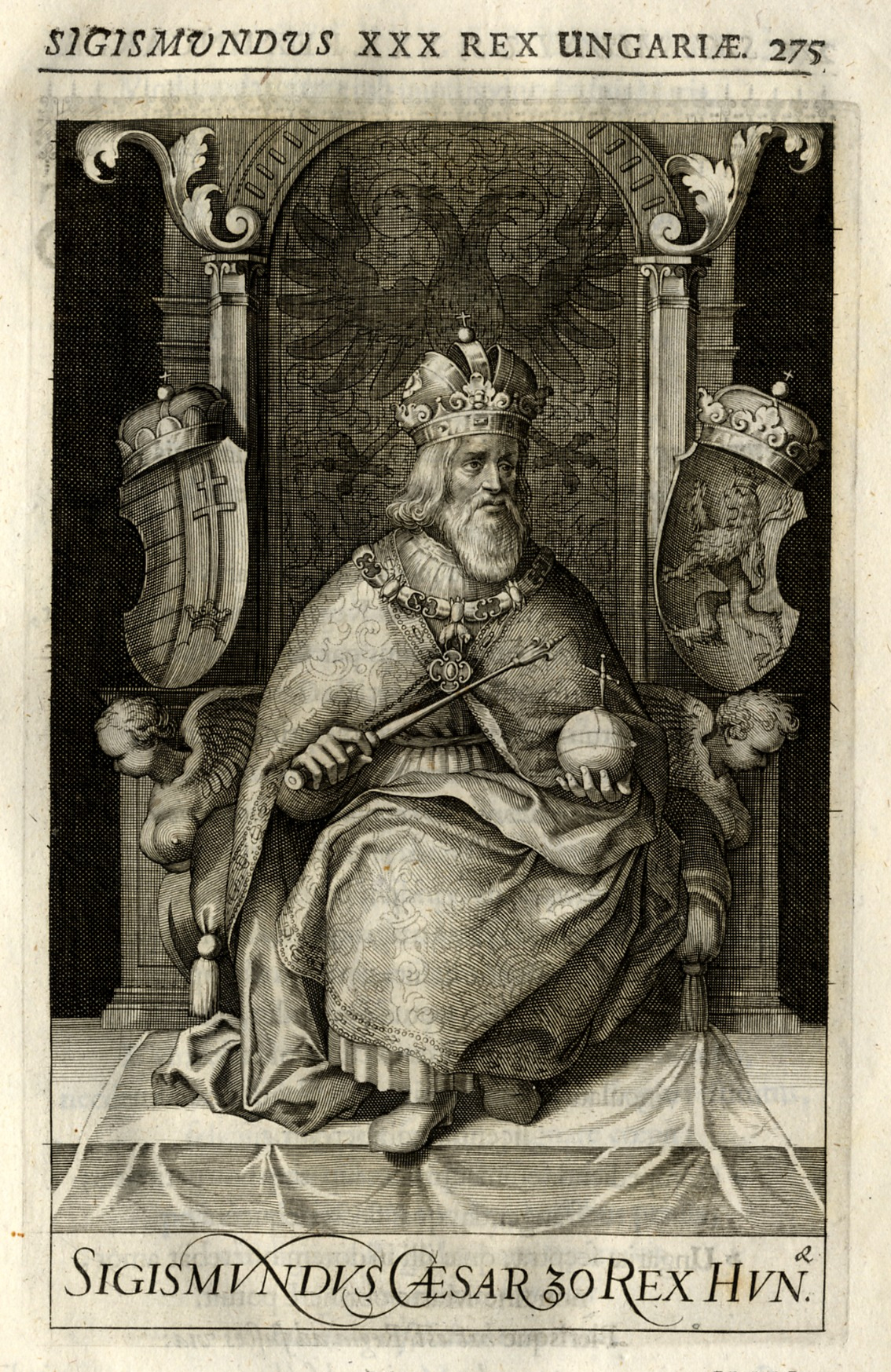
King Sigismund of Hungary, Nádasdy Mausoleum, 1664

In 1412, a Knights' Tournament was held in Buda, Hungary. This was also a conference between Hungarian King Sigismund, Polish King Wladyslaw II (Jogaila) and Bosnian King Tvrtko II. 2000 knights were present from all over Europe, even England. There were many princes, lords, knights and servants at the court of Buda in Hungary. Three kings and three other monarchs, a Serbian despot, 13 herzogs and/or dukes, 21 counts, 2,000 knights, 1 cardinal, 1 legate, 3 archbishops, 11 other bishops, 86 players and trumpeters, 17 messengers, and 40,000 horses. There were people from 17 countries and languages. A presumably contemporary list of the participants of the meeting has also survived. Besides the host, Sigismund, and his main guest, Władysław II, this text mentions Władysław's cousin Vytautas, Grand Duke of Lithuania, and the king of Bosnia, usually identified as Tvrtko II. Some argue convincingly that it was not Tvrtko II but Stjepan Ostoja who visited Buda at that time. Besides the king, Hrvoje Vukčić Hrvatinić, Sandalj Hranić Kosača and Pavle Radinović also came from Bosnia, and from Serbia, the Despot Stefan Lazarević, bringing two thousand horses. From Austria, Ernest, Duke of Austria and Albert II of Germany, the latter successor of Sigismund, also took part in the Buda meeting. Also Heinrich von Plauen, the Grand Master of the Teutonic Order, Stibor of Stiboricz, Nicholas II Garai, Hermann II, Count of Celje and his son Frederick II, Count of Celje, Karlo Kurjaković, count of Krbava, Ivan Morović, ban of Machva. Długosz reports the arrival in Buda of the envoys of the Jalal al-Din, khan of the Golden Horde and son of Tokhtamysh, who wanted to meet Władysław II of Poland. Jalal al-Din was an ally of the Polish and Lithuanian rulers in their fight against the Teutonic Order, and according to some reconstructions of the events, Sigismund also wanted to rely on the Tatars against the Ottoman threat. A narrative source from Lübeck also mentions the proceedings in Buda in 1412. Detmar's Lübeckische Chronik continued from 1400 to 1413. The continuation also gives a detailed description of the participants at the Buda meeting. The royal meeting was accompanied by festivities and various entertainments. At the tournament, a knight from Silesia named Nemsche and a page from Austria won the joust. A Polish priest and chronicler Jan Długosz says in his Annales seu cronici incliti regni Poloniae that in the tournament there were also knights from Bulgaria, probably from the court of Prince Fruzhin, Sigismund's vassal, who was also at the conference.

=== Council of Constance ===
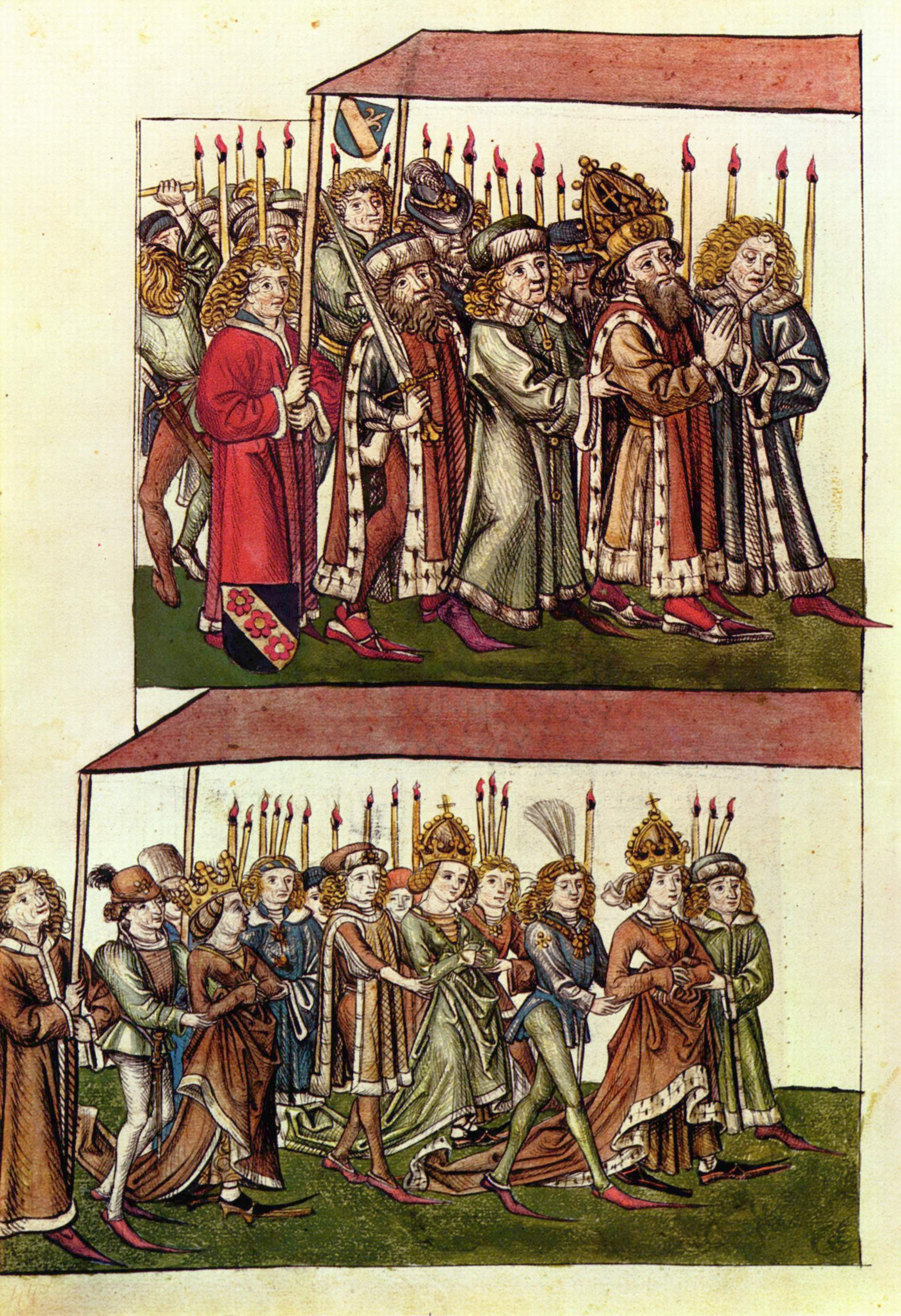
Sigismund and Barbara of Celje at the Council of Constance.

From 1412 to 1423, Sigismund campaigned against the Republic of Venice in Italy. The king took advantage of the difficulties of Antipope John XXIII to obtain a promise that a council should be called in Constance in 1414 to settle the Western Schism. He took a leading part in the deliberations of this assembly, and during the sittings travelled to France, England, and Burgundy in a vain attempt to secure the abdication of the three rival popes. The council ended in 1418, having resolved the Schism and – of great consequence to Sigismund's future career – having the Czech religious reformer, Jan Hus, burned at the stake for heresy in July 1415. The complicity of Sigismund in the death of Hus is a matter of controversy. He had granted Hus a safe conduct and protested against his imprisonment, and Hus was burned during Sigismund's absence, by a decision of an ad hoc Church court outside of Sigismund's jurisdiction as an Emperor.

When at one point during the council a cardinal corrected Sigismund's Latin, Sigismund replied Ego sum rex Romanus et super grammaticam ("I am king of the Romans and above grammar"). Thomas Carlyle nicknamed Sigismund "Super Grammaticam".

His main acts during these years were an alliance with England against France, and a failed attempt, owing to the hostility of the princes, to secure peace in Germany by a league of the towns. Also, Sigismund awarded Brandenburg (which he had recovered after Jobst's death) to Frederick I, Elector of Brandenburg, burgrave of Nuremberg, in 1415. This step made the House of Hohenzollern one of the most important in Germany.

Sigismund began to shift his alliance from France to England after the French defeat at the Battle of Agincourt, which he was also controversially absent from due to hosting a pseudo-council in Perpignan with Antipope Benedict XIII and King Ferdinand I of Aragon. The signing of the Treaty of Canterbury on 15 August 1416 culminated diplomatic efforts between Henry V of England and Sigismund and resulted in a defensive and offensive alliance against France. This, in turn, led the way to the resolution of the papal schism. The close relationship that developed between Henry V and Sigismund resulted in him being inducted into the Order of the Garter.

=== Hussite Wars ===
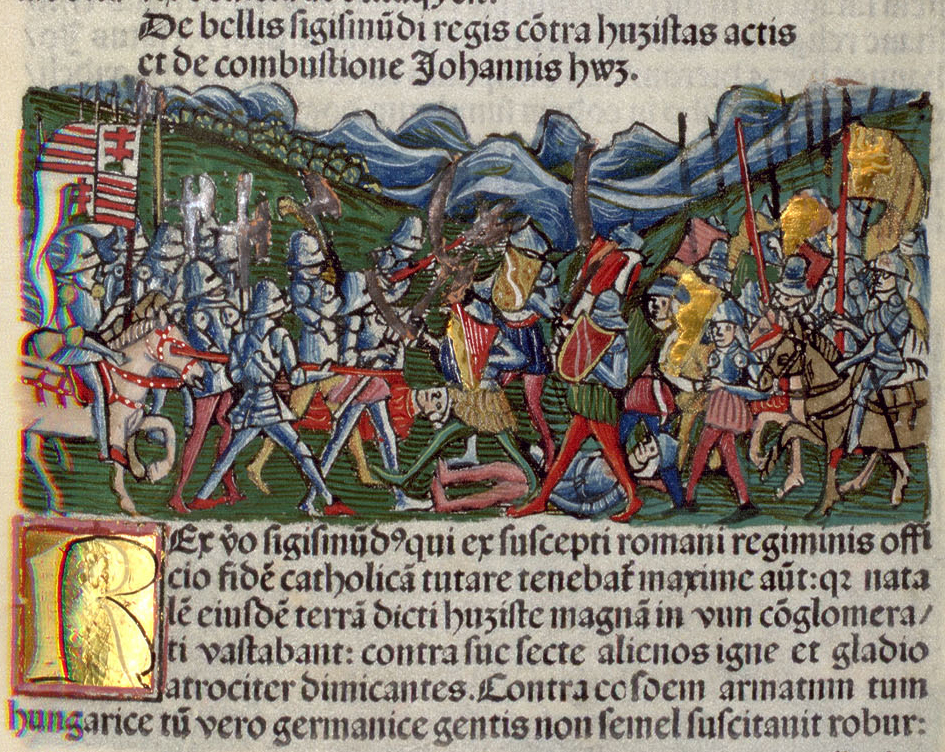
The wars of King Sigismund against the Hussites, Chronica Hungarorum, 1488

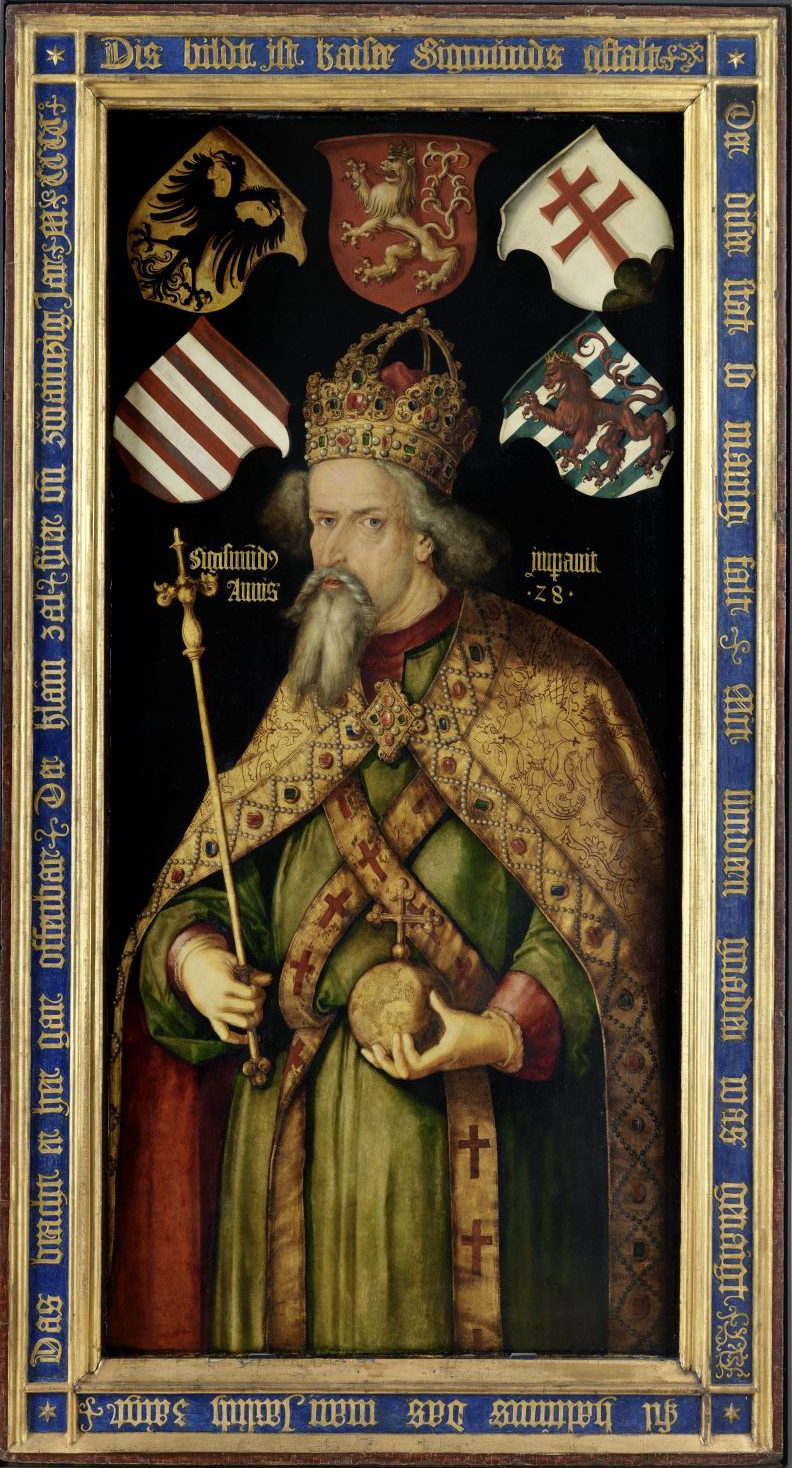
Portrait of Emperor Sigismund, painted by Albrecht Dürer after the emperor's death

In 1419, the death of Wenceslaus IV of Bohemia left Sigismund titular King of Bohemia, but he had to wait for seventeen years before the Czech Estates would acknowledge him. Although the two dignities of king of the Romans and king of Bohemia added considerably to his importance, and indeed made him the nominal temporal head of Christendom, they conferred no increase of power and financially embarrassed him. It was only as King of Hungary that he had succeeded in establishing his authority and in doing anything for the order and good government of the land. Entrusting the government of Bohemia to Sophia of Bavaria, the widow of Wenceslaus, he hastened into Hungary.

The Bohemians, who distrusted him as the betrayer of Jan Hus, were soon in arms, and the flame was fanned when Sigismund declared his intention of prosecuting the war against heretics. Three campaigns against the Hussites ended in disaster, although the army of his most loyal ally Stibor of Stiboricz and later his son Stibor of Beckov could hold the Hussite side away from the borders of the kingdom. The Turks took advantage of the internal disorder and soon began attacking Hungary again at this time.

Jan Žižka defeated the Sigismund's Imperial force at the Battle of Kutná Hora in December 1421 and then at the Battle of Německý Brod in January 1422. Furthermore, Grand Duke of Lithuania Vytautas, sent Sigismund Korybut to lead his army to Bohemia. Sigismund Korybut arrived in Prague on 16 May 1422, and was acknowledged ruler of Bohemia. He became commander of local Hussites, succeed in ending the internal discords between Jan Žižka and the Utraquists, enabling a successful Hussite military campaign to Moravia against Emperor Sigismund. The army of Sigismund of Hungary retreated to Hungary in avoidance of the encounter. The unexpected defeats at the hands of the Hussites "ended the first Imperial and Catholic attempt to crush the Bohemian "heretic rebellion"." At the July–September 1422 Diet of Nuremberg, Sigismund and German territorial princes collaborated to organise two armies against the Hussite rebels. The first army was sent to relieve Karlštejn, which was under a Hussite siege; the second army was ordered to destroy the Hussite field army.

The alliance against the Hussites continued to develop, though, joined by Upper German princes and cities, even from "the regions furthest from Bohemia". In January 1424, the associative activity of the German electors led to the Union ("einunge") of Bingen, "within which the Rhenish princes were joined by the elector of Saxony and Sigismund's loyal partner, Margrave Frederick of Brandenburg, and mutual assistance, adjudication, and cooperation in the face of the Hussite threat were stipulated."

Sigismund of Hungary and Sigismund Korybut began negotiations, with an intention to reconcile the Catholics and Hussites. However, after Žižka's death, despite Sigismund Korybut becoming the supreme commander of his army and gaining victory in the Battle of Usti nad Labem in 1427, not long after, he was accused by Prague Taborites of an organization of a revolt in Prague and imprisoned, effectively ending his political power in Bohemia. After the release from prison in 1428, Sigismund Korybut still participated in Taborite battles in Silesia, however, after their decisive loss in the Battle of Lipany he returned to the Grand Duchy of Lithuania and as a consequence of the battle, Compacts of Basel was signed in July 1436. The following month, Sigismund of Hungary was accepted as King of Bohemia by most factions. Although, the last formation of opposing Taborites were defeated at the castle Sion in late 1437.

=== Kingdom of Germany ===
Sigismund's rule in Germany and in the empire in general was hampered by his complete lack of Hausmacht (domestic power) within the Kingdom of Germany.

His rule relied on key allies and the culture of associative political mechanisms in Germany. Duncan Hardy remarks that "both the local and the trans-regional dimensions of the political activity displayed by the sources from throughout Sigismund's reign demonstrate that power at every level in the empire was exercised and mediated through the customary institutions and mechanisms of associative political culture. If Sigismund enjoyed considerable successes at certain junctures, it was not in spite of or independently from these institutions and mechanisms, but precisely because he devoted considerable energy to harnessing associative interactions and building strategic relationships with leading actors within elite networks. Even during his prolonged absences from the empire's core lands, Sigismund was able to make use of these partnerships, and could reasonably expect that the associative activity of princes, nobles, and towns would yield results – as indeed they did, in the form of large-scale collective activity against Duke Frederick IV of Austria – Tyrol in the 1410 and the Hussites in the 1420. Not all of Sigismund's projects came to fruition, and he could not always control the longer-term outcomes of his policies, but the notion that there were phases of an 'empire without a king' during his reign clearly does not stand up to the abundant evidence of his interactions with regional clients and associations. At the same time, the somewhat adulatory view that has developed in recent years of Sigismund as a masterly politician can be tempered by the evidence that it was often felicitous alliances as much as personal skill which made his successes possible."

The alliance between Sigismund and his two key allies in Germany, namely Frederick I, Elector of Brandenburg and Albert II of Germany (who became his son-in-law and heir through the marriage with Sigismund's only daughter Elizabeth of Luxembourg), started the rise of the Hohenzollerns and reboosted the Habsburgs (who returned to the German throne and also inherited the connection with Hungary, Croatia and Bohemia from Sigismund).

=== Final years ===
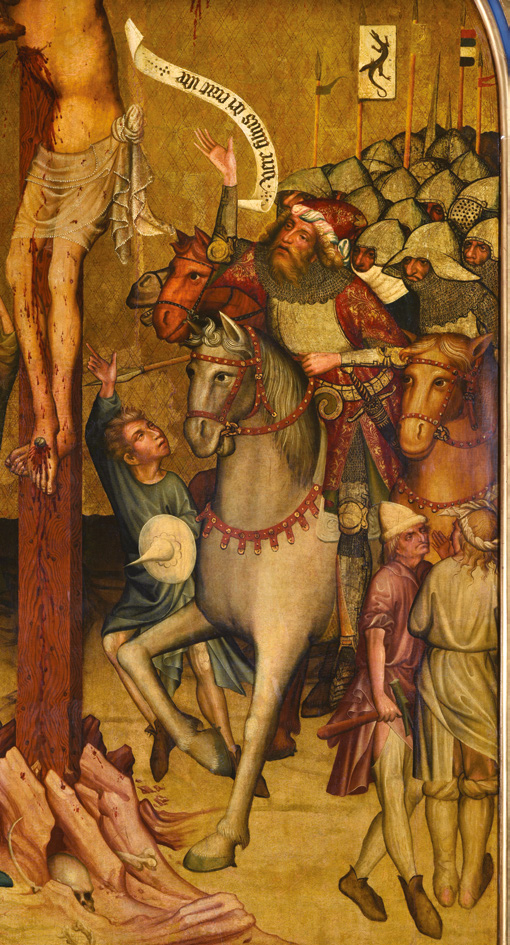
Calvary altar with the representation of King Sigismund of Hungary, 1427

In 1428, Sigismund led another campaign against the Ottoman Turks, but again with few results. In 1431, he went to Milan where on 25 November he received the Iron Crown as King of Italy; after which he remained for some time at Siena, negotiating for his coronation as emperor and for the recognition of the Council of Basel by Pope Eugenius IV. He was crowned emperor in Rome on 31 May 1433, and after obtaining his demands from the pope, returned to Bohemia, where he was recognised as king in 1436, though his power was little more than nominal. Shortly after he was crowned, Pope Eugenius began attempts to create a new anti-Ottoman alliance. This was sparked by an Albanian revolt against the Ottomans, which had begun in 1432. In 1435, Sigismund sent Fruzhin, a Bulgarian nobleman, to negotiate an alliance with the Albanians. He also sent Daud, a pretender to the Ottoman throne, in early 1436. However, following the defeat of the rebels in 1436, plans for an anti-Ottoman alliance ended. Sigismund died on 9 December 1437 at Znojmo (German: Znaim), Moravia (now Czech Republic), and as ordered in life, he was buried at Nagyvárad, Hungary (today Oradea, Romania), next to the tomb of the King Saint Ladislaus I of Hungary, who was the ideal of the perfect monarch, warrior and Christian for that time and was deeply venerated by Sigismund. By his second wife, Barbara of Cilli, he left an only daughter, Elisabeth of Luxembourg, who was married to Albert V, Duke of Austria (later German king as Albert II), whom Sigismund named as his successor. As he left no sons, the male line of Henry VII, Holy Roman Emperor became extinct on his death.

== Family and issue ==
Sigismund married twice but had little luck in securing the succession to his crowns. Each of his two marriages resulted in the birth of one child. His firstborn child, probably a son, was born prematurely as a result of a horse riding accident suffered by Mary, Queen of Hungary when she was well advanced in pregnancy. Mother and child both died shortly after the birth in the hills of Buda on 17 May 1395. This caused a deep succession crisis because Sigismund ruled over Hungary by right of his wife, and although he managed to keep his power, the crisis lasted until his second marriage to Barbara of Cilli. Barbara's only child, born in the purple on 7 October 1409, probably in the castle of Visegrád, was Elisabeth of Luxembourg, the future queen consort of Hungary, Germany, and Bohemia. Queen Barbara was unable to give birth to any further issue. Elizabeth of Luxembourg was thus the only surviving legitimate offspring of Sigismund.

=== Hungarian affiliations ===
Coat of arms of John Hunyadi

Sigismund was known to speak fluent Hungarian, wore Hungarian-style royal clothes, and even grew his beard in the Hungarian fashion.

Emperor Sigismund, in terms of the quality of his face and the greatness of his stature, was a fairly great man. The world's chief creator blessed him with a beautiful face, curly, bluish hair, and a gentle look. He wore a long beard out of his attraction to the Hungarians because they also wore long beards once upon a time.

— Johannes de Thurocz: Chronica Hungarorum

He also spent huge amounts of money during his reign to rebuild the Gothic castles of Buda and Visegrád in the Kingdom of Hungary, ordering the transportation of materials from Austria and Bohemia.

His many affairs with women led to the birth of several legends, as the one that existed decades later during the reign of the King Matthias Corvinus of Hungary. According to this, John Hunyadi was Sigismund's illegitimate son. Sigismund gave a ring to the boy's mother when he was born, but one day in the forest, a raven stole it from her, and the ring was only recovered after the bird was hunted down. It is said that this incident inspired the coat of arms of the Hunyadis, and later also appeared in the coat of arms of Matthias "Corvinus".

Sigismund adopted the Hungarian reverence for Saint Ladislaus I of Hungary, who was considered to be an ideal Christian knight at that time. He went on pilgrimage several times to his tomb in Nagyvárad. Before Sigismund died, in Znaim, Moravia, he ordered to be buried next to the king saint.

Through his father, Sigismund was a grandnephew of Wenceslaus III of Bohemia, one of a short-reigning monarch of Hungary between the Hungarian Árpád dynasty and Angevin dynasty. In addition, the bloodline of Sigismund connects through three princesses to the Árpád.

Béla III of Hungary; King of Hungary
Andrew II of Hungary; King of Hungary	Constance of Hungary; Queen of Bohemia
Béla IV of Hungary; King of Hungary
Yolanda of Poland; Duchess of Greater Poland	Anna of Hungary, Duchess of Macsó; Duchess of Macsó	Wenceslaus I of Bohemia; King of Bohemia
Jadwiga of Kalisz; Queen of Poland	Kunigunda of Halych; Queen of Bohemia	Ottokar II of Bohemia; King of Bohemia
Casimir III the Great; King of Poland	Wenceslaus II of Bohemia; King of Bohemia
Elizabeth of Poland, Duchess of Pomerania; Duchess of Pomerania	Wenceslaus III of Bohemia; King of Bohemia	Elizabeth of Bohemia; Queen of Bohemia
Elizabeth of Pomerania; Holy Roman Empress	Charles IV; Holy Roman Emperor
Sigismund; King of Hungary

== Reformatio Sigismundi ==
The Reformatio Sigismundi appeared in connection with efforts to reform the Holy Roman Empire during the reign of Emperor Sigismund (1410–1437). It was presented in 1439 at the Council of Basel, published by an anonymous author, and referred to the injustice of the German rulers. It included a vision of Sigismund's about the appearance of a priest-king, Frederick, as well as plans for a wide reform of the monarchy and emperorship and the German empire.

== Titles ==
- Title of Sigismund in the Hungarian first decree of 1405: "Sigismund, by the Grace of God, King of Hungary, Dalmatia, Croatia, Rama, Serbia, Galicia, Lodomeria, Cumania and Bulgaria, Margrave of Brandenburg, Chief Chamberlain of the Holy Roman Empire, Heir of Bohemia and Luxemburg."

== Heraldry ==
Heraldry of Sigismund, Holy Roman Emperor

Coat of arms as King of the Romans (1433–1437)	Coat of arms as Holy Roman Emperor (1433–1437), king of Hungary and Bohemia
Arms of the House of Luxembourg-Hungary-Bohemia
Coat of arms as Knight of the Garter

== In popular culture ==
=== Films ===
King Sigismund is portrayed by Czech actor Jan Pivec in Czechoslovak movie series Hussite Revolutionary Trilogy directed by Otakar Vávra

King Sigismund is portrayed by British actor Matthew Goode in the 2022 film Jan Žižka by director Petr Jákl.

King and Emperor Sigismund are portrayed by Hungarian actor László Gálffi in the 2025 historical television series Rise of the Raven.

=== Video games ===
King Sigismund is a briefly seen antagonist in the 2018 Warhorse Studios action role-playing game Kingdom Come: Deliverance, where he leads an attack on the main character's village. The main character becomes involved in a plot which opposes Sigismund and aims to restore Wenceslaus to the Bohemian throne. Sigismund returned in Kingdom Come: Deliverance II, where he appeared at a city council meeting in Kuttenberg, accompanied by Markvart von Aulitz, was portrayed by Ondřej Vetchý.

== See also ==
- Kings of Germany family tree
- Stibor of Stiboricz
- Clan of Ostoja
- Order of the Dragon

== Bibliography ==
- Ćirković, Sima (2004). The Serbs. Malden: Blackwell Publishing. ISBN 978-1405142915.
- Fine, John Van Antwerp Jr. (1994) [1987]. The Late Medieval Balkans: A Critical Survey from the Late Twelfth Century to the Ottoman Conquest. Ann Arbor, Michigan: University of Michigan Press. ISBN 0472082604.
- Geaman, Kristen L. (2022). Anne of Bohemia. Routledge.
- Hoensch, Jörg K. (2000). Die Luxemburger: Eine spätmittelalterliche Dynastie gesamteuropäischer Bedeutung 1308-1437 (in German). Verlag W. Kohlhammer.
- Jefferson, John (2012). The Holy Wars of King Wladislas and Sultan Murad: The Ottoman-Christian from 1438-1444. Brill Publishers. ISBN 978-9004-21904-5.
- Kondyli, Fotini; Andriopoulou, Vera; Panou, Eirini; Cunningham, Mary B., eds. (2014). Sylvester Syropoulos on Politics and Culture in the Fifteenth-Century Mediterranean: Themes and Problems in the Memoirs, Section IV: 16 (Birmingham Byzantine and Ottoman Studies). Routledge.
- Wood, Christopher S. (2008). Forgery, Replica, Fiction: Temporalities of German Renaissance Art. University of Chicago Press.

Sigismund, Holy Roman Emperor House of Luxembourg Born: 15 February 1368 Died: 9 December 1437
Regnal titles
Preceded by Mary, Queen of Hungary as sole monarch	King of Hungary and Croatia; 1387 – 1437 with Mary, Queen of Hungary	Succeeded by Albert II of Germany
Preceded by Rupert of Germany	German King (formally King of the Romans); 1410 – 1437 contested by Jobst of Moravia (1410 – 1411)	Succeeded by Albert II of Germany
Preceded by Wenceslaus IV of Bohemia	King of Bohemia; 1419 – 1437	Succeeded by Albert II of Germany
Preceded by Wenceslaus IV of Bohemia	Elector of Brandenburg; 1378 – 1388	Succeeded by Jobst of Moravia
Preceded by Jobst of Moravia	Elector of Brandenburg; 1411 – 1415	Succeeded by Frederick I, Elector of Brandenburg
Vacant Interregnum Title last held by Charles IV, Holy Roman Emperor	Holy Roman Emperor; 1433 – 1437	Succeeded by Frederick III, Holy Roman Emperor
