= Olomouc Law Book =

15th-century Moravian manuscript

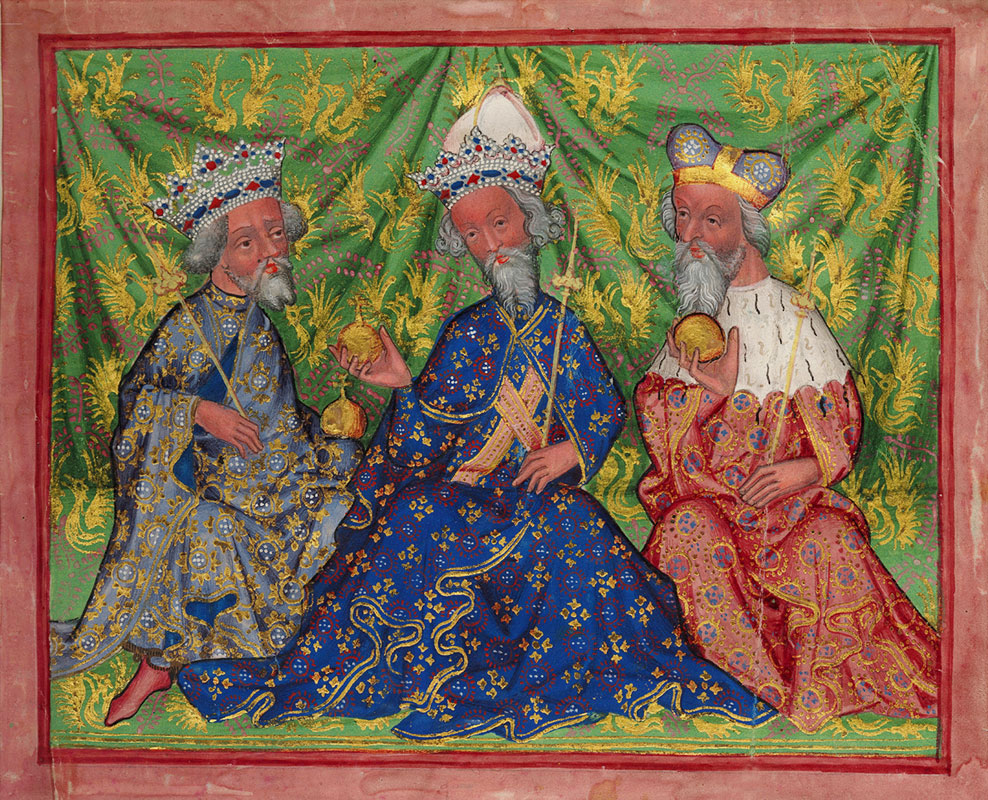
Emperor Charles IV (centre), King Wenceslaus IV (left) and Margrave Jobst (right)

The Olomouc Law Book or Commemorative Book of Olomouc (shelfmark SOk AO, cod. Knihy, 1540) is an illuminated manuscript created for the city of Olomouc around 1430 and currently in the municipal archives.

The manuscript is parchment and measures 350 by 265 millimetres (13.8 in × 10.4 in). It is bound between wooden boards covered in red leather; they were restored in 1959.

The text is Latin and German in Gothic italic script. The scribe was Václav of Jihlava, who was active in Olomouc between 1423 and 1446. Although the illumination has in the past been attributed to Václav of Jihlava or to the illustrator Vaněk, a town councilor in 1435–39, it is more likely the masterwork of a foreign artist. It is in the style of International Gothic with clear Austrian influence.

There is a full-page illustration that shows the twelve members of the town council taking their oath of office, with Václav of Jihlava at work in the corner. As the twelve councilors are identifiable as historical persons, this is "the first known case of the portrayal of a concrete event from contemporary life" in Czech art. In contrast with the lack of convention and stylization in the portrayal of the councilors, there is a half-page illustration of the three reigning monarchs that is highly conventional and symbolic. The Emperor Charles IV is surrounded by his son King Wenceslaus IV of Bohemia and nephew Margrave Jobst of Moravia. They are all shown with the symbols of rule and their characteristic beards: Charles wears a closed crown, Wenceslaus an open one and Jobst a margravial hat. The difference between the two illustrations has led some to posit two illustratos.
