= John II of Liechtenstein =

15th century nobleman

- Burgrave of Znojmo Castle
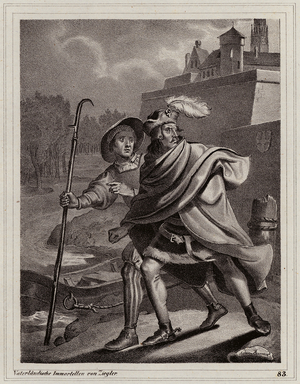
- John II escaping with Wenceslaus IV, 19th-century engraving

- Coat of arms
- Native name: Jan II. z Lichtenštejna
- Died: c. 1412
- Noble family: House of Liechtenstein

John II of Liechtenstein (died c. 1412) was a 15th-century nobleman and member of the council of Jobst of Moravia. He was burgrave of Znojmo Castle.

John II helped King Wenceslaus IV escape to Vienna from his second imprisonment on 11 November 1403. Wenceslas was able to initially escape his prison wearing a disguise. He crossed the Danube, where John II was waiting for him with a guard of fifty horsemen who escorted him to Mikulov Castle.

In 1405, Margrave Jobst paid a ransom for John II after he was captured in his service.

== Family ==
John II was the son of Hartneid III of Liechtenstein, and the grandson of Hartneid II of Liechtenstein. His uncle, John I of Liechtenstein, acquired the lands of Lednice for the family.

== In popular culture ==
A fictionalized John II appears in the 2018 video game Kingdom Come: Deliverance. He returned in the 2025 sequel Kingdom Come: Deliverance II. In 2022, it was leaked that John II would be voiced by actor Richard Kiess. He was portrayed by Czech actor Matouš Ruml, who also voiced the character in the Czech version of the game.
