= 1410–1411 imperial elections =

In the years 1410 and 1411 saw three royal elections in the Holy Roman Empire. The elections were prompted by the death of the previous King of the Romans Rupert III in 1410 and, after two contested elections in 1410, resulted in King Sigismund of Hungary being recognized as the new king in 1411.

== Background ==
In 1378, Wenceslaus IV, of the House of Luxembourg, had succeeded his father Charles IV as ruler of both the Holy Roman Empire (King of the Romans) and the Kingdom of Bohemia. However, his failure to stamp out civil unrest or resolve the Western Schism led some of the prince-electors to remove him from his rule in 1400. In August 1400 four of the seven prince-electors chose Rupert, Elector Palatinate from the House of Wittelsbach as the new King of the Romans. Wenceslaus did not recognise his removal but did not move against Rupert either. Rupert ruled for ten years until he died on 18 May 1410.

After Rupert's death, two princes vied for the succession, both from the House of Luxembourg:

- Sigismund, King of Hungary, Wenceslaus's younger brother and also son of the previous Emperor Charles IV.
- Jobst, Margrave of Moravia, nephew of Emperor Charles IV and cousin to both Wenceslaus and Sigismund.

Wenceslaus supported neither candidate as he still deemed himself the rightful King of the Romans.

== Rival elections of 1410 ==
=== 20 September 1410 imperial election ===
20 September 1410 imperial election
- 20 September 1410

3 Prince-electors (Note: This assembly consisted of only three electors: the Elector Palatine, the Elector of Trier, and the Elector of Brandenburg (represented by proxy). This assembly lacked the legal majority of four required by the Golden Bull of 1356, causing the election to be disputed.)
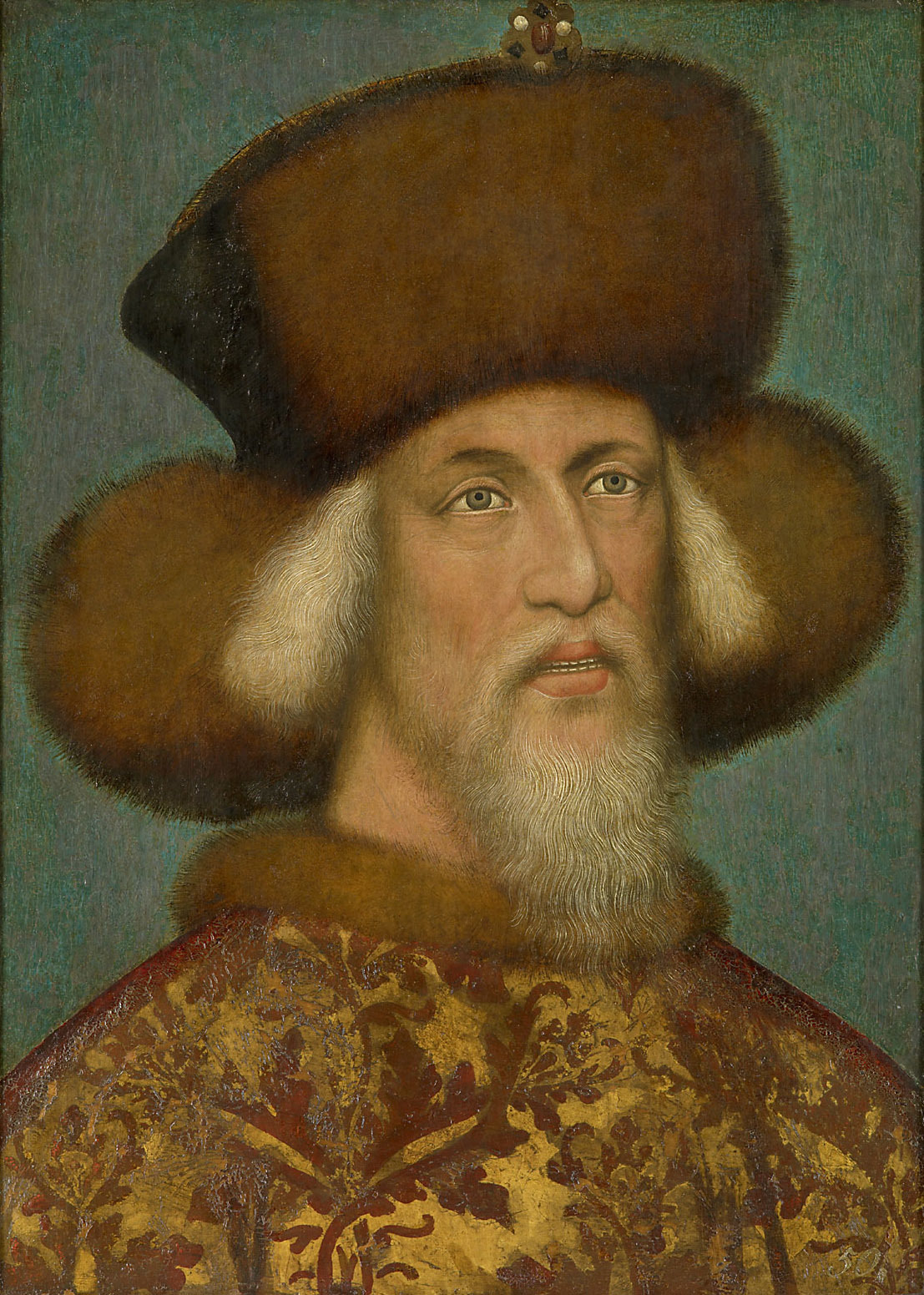
Candidate	Sigismund
House	Luxembourg
Electoral vote	3
Percentage	100%
King before election
Rupert
(Died 18 May 1410)
Wittelsbach
Elected King
Sigismund (disputed) (Note: Sigismund failed to reach the majority of four votes required by the Golden Bull of 1356. His status remained unrecognized until he was unanimously re-elected in July 1411, following the death of his rival, Jobst of Moravia.)
House of Luxembourg

On 20 September 1410, three prince-electors convened to elect a new king. These were:

- Louis III, Elector Palatine, the son of the deceased King Rupert III.
- Werner von Falkenstein, Archbishop of Trier.
- Frederick, Burgrave of Nuremberg, from the House of Hohernzollern, as the representative of Sigismund in his capacity as Margrave of Brandenburg.

These three men elected Sigismund as the new king.

However, the remaining electors accepted neither Sigismund's election nor his right to act as Elector of Brandenburg. Sigismund, had ruled Brandenburg since 1378 but in 1388 had pawned it to his cousin, Jobst. Jobst argued that his rule over Brandenburg - even as a pawn - entailed its electoral vote, while Sigismund argued that it did not.

=== 1 October 1410 imperial election ===
1 October 1410 imperial election
- 1 October 1410

4 Prince-electors (Note: Four electors attended: the Elector of Mainz, the Elector of Cologne, the Elector of Saxony, and the Elector of Brandenburg (Jobst himself).) 4 votes needed to win (Note: Four votes were required to establish an absolute majority of the seven recognized electoral seats.)
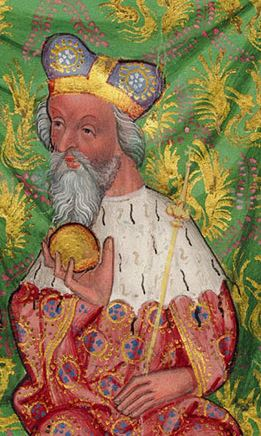
Candidate	Jobst
House	Luxembourg
Electoral vote	4
Percentage	100%
King before election
Rupert
(Died 18 May 1410)
Wittelsbach
Elected King
Jobst
House of Luxembourg

On 1 October 1410 another set of electors convened to elect a different king:

- Friedrick III of Saarwerden, Archbishop of Cologne.
- Johann II of Nassau, Archbishop of Mainz.
- Rudolf III, Duke of Saxe-Wittenberg.
- Jobst of Moravia in his capacity as Margrave of Brandenburg.

These four men elected Jobst as the new king.

== 1411 election ==
1411 Imperial election
- 21 July 1411

7 Prince-electors 4 votes needed to win
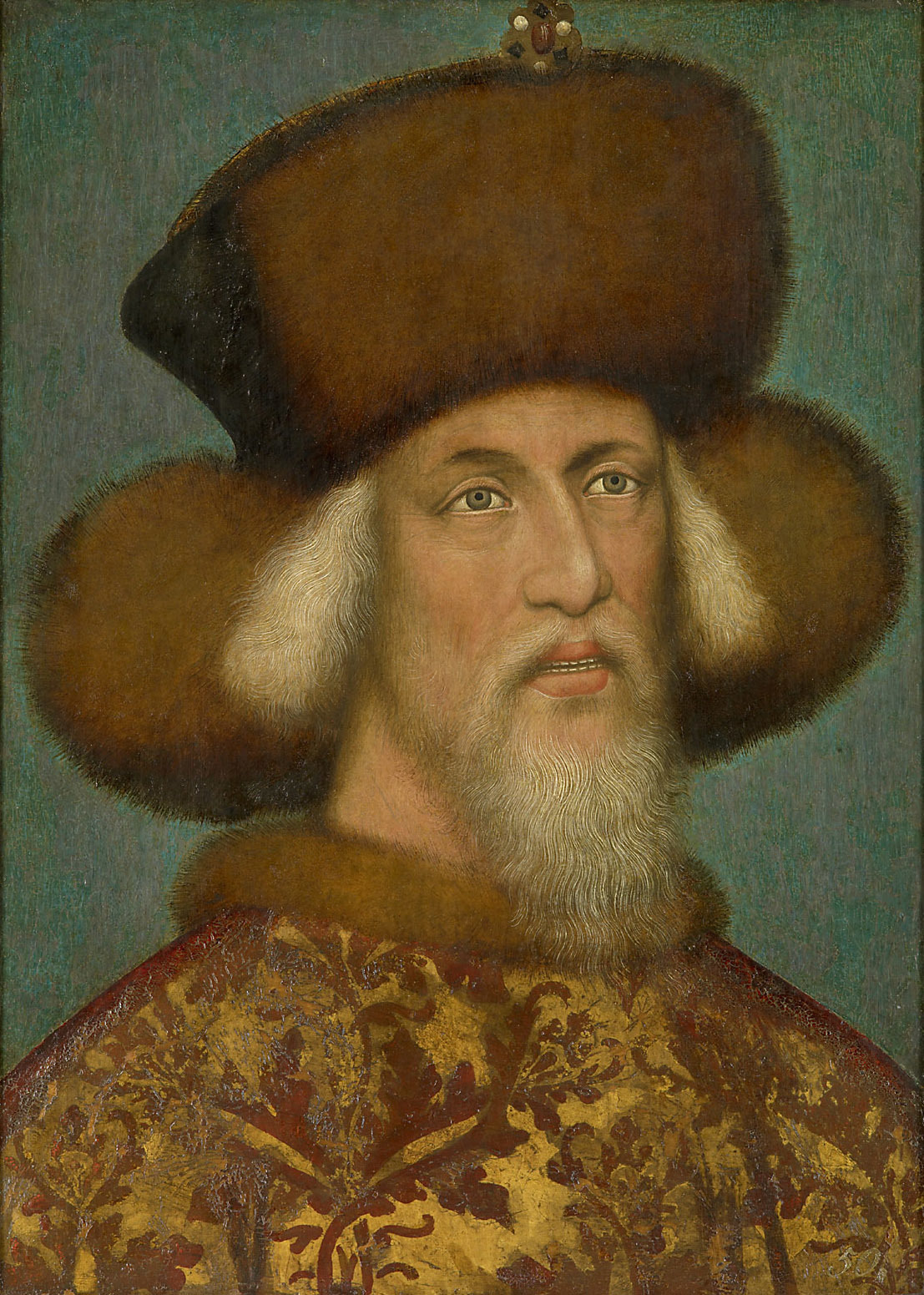
Candidate	Sigismund
House	Luxembourg
Electoral vote	7
Percentage	100%
King before election
disputed
Elected King
Sigismund
House of Luxembourg

The elections of 1410 had resulted in two rival claimants to the kingship. Of the two, Jobst could count on the stronger support but he suddenly died on January 18, 1411, leaving the road to the throne open to the remaining claimant, Sigismund. However, Sigismund did not simply accede to the throne. On 21 July 1411, the prince-electors - who had previously stood on opposing sides - convened for another election. These were:

- Johann II of Nassau, Archbishop of Mainz.
- Frederick III of Saarwerden, Archbishop of Cologne.
- Werner of Falkenstein, elector of Archbishop of Trier.
- Louis III, Elector Palatinate.
- Rudolf III, Duke of Saxe-Wittenberg.
- Sigismund, in his capacity as Margrave of Brandenburg.
- Wenceslaus IV, King of Bohemia.

Wenceslaus, who had not taken part in the previous elections, agreed to cast his vote, thus accepting his deposition of 1400, in exchange for being confirmed as King of Bohemia.

The electors unanimously elected Sigismund. By his participation in this election, Sigismund had tacitly admitted that his election in September of the previous year had been invalid. He was crowned King of the Romans at Aachen on November 8, 1414.

== Aftermath ==
One of the tasks, Sigismund set himself was to end the Western Schism. He urged the rival claimants to the papacy to participate in the Council of Constance, called in the name of the Pisan Pope John XXIII in 1414. The council accepted the resignation of the Roman Pope Gregory XII on July 4, 1415, and excommunicated John XXIII and the Avignonian Pope Benedict XIII in 1417. Pope Martin V was elected pope on November 11, ending the schism.

On May 31, 1433, Sigismund was crowned Holy Roman Emperor by Pope Eugene IV at Saint Peter's Basilica, Rome.

In exchange for his support in the imperial election of September 1410, Sigismund appointed Frederick I the Elector of Brandenburg at the Council of Constance on April 30, 1415. Frederick I was the first member of the House of Hohenzollern, which would produce later produce the four Elector-Dukes of Brandenburg-Prussia from 1618 to 1701 (through personal union with Brandenburg in August 27, 1618), Kings of Prussia from 1701 to 1918 and three German Emperors from 1871 to 1918.
