= Jobst of Moravia =

15th-century King of Germany

Jobst
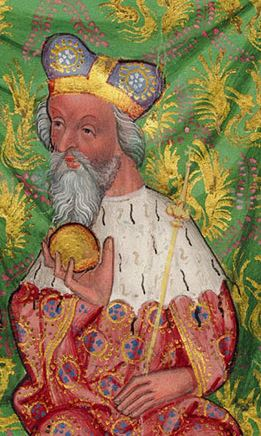
- Near contemporary portrait, from the Olomouc Law Book, c. 1430

King of Germany (formally King of the Romans)
- Reign: 1 October 1410 – 18 January 1411
- Predecessor: Rupert
- Successor: Sigismund
- Contender: Sigismund (1410–1411)

Duke of Luxembourg
- Reign: 1388 – 18 January 1411
- Predecessor: Wenceslaus
- Successor: Elisabeth

Elector of Brandenburg
- Reign: 1388 – 18 January 1411
- Predecessor: Sigismund
- Successor: Sigismund

Margrave of Moravia
- Reign: 12 November 1375 – 18 January 1411
- Predecessor: John Henry
- Successor: Sigismund
- Born: c. 1354; Brno, Kingdom of Bohemia
- Died: 18 January 1411 (aged c. 56); Brno, Moravia
- Burial: Church of St. Thomas, Brno
- Spouse: Elisabeth of Opole; Agnes of Opole
- House: Luxembourg
- Father: John Henry, Margrave of Moravia
- Mother: Margaret of Opava

Jobst of Moravia (Czech: Jošt Moravský or Jošt Lucemburský; German: Jo(b)st or Jodokus von Mähren; Luxembourgish: Jobst vu Mähren or Jobst vu Lëtzebuerg; c. 1354 – 18 January 1411), a member of the House of Luxembourg, was Margrave of Moravia from 1375, Duke of Luxembourg and Elector of Brandenburg from 1388 as well as elected King of Germany (King of the Romans) from 1410 until his death. Jobst was an ambitious and versatile ruler, who in the early 15th century dominated the ongoing struggles within the Luxembourg dynasty and around the German throne.

== Life ==
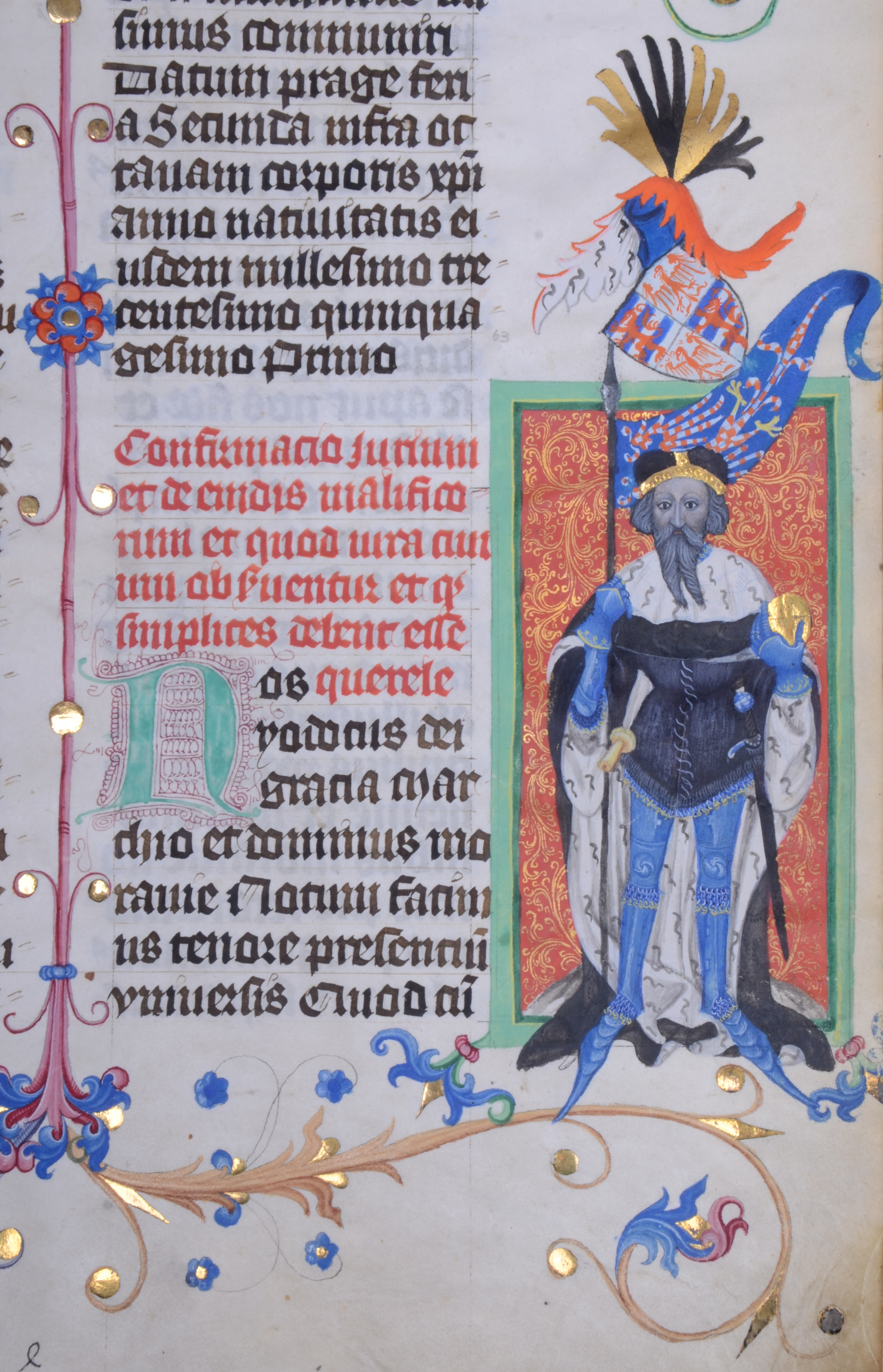
Jobst of Moravia, Gelnhausen Codex, 15th century

Jobst was presumably born in 1354 in the Moravian residence of Brno, and was the eldest legitimate son of Margrave John Henry, younger brother of Holy Roman Emperor Charles IV. Therefore, Wenceslaus IV of Bohemia and his half-brother Sigismund were both Jobst's cousins.

Designated heir upon his father's death in 1375, he ruled the Margraviate of Moravia, and would often quarrel with his younger brother Prokop and the Bishops of Olomouc. In 1388, Jobst received the Duchy of Luxembourg, given in pawn by his cousin the King of the Romans Wenceslaus, son of the late Emperor Charles IV. The same year, Jobst also became Prince-elector of Brandenburg, pawned by Sigismund, who focused on his rule over the Kingdom of Hungary. In 1394, Jobst joined the League of Lords, a rebellion of Bohemian nobles around Boček II of Poděbrady against Wenceslaus. He had Wenceslaus arrested at Prague Castle and later taken into custody by the Austrian Starhemberg dynasty at Wildberg. Peace was made at the instigation of Wenceslaus' brothers Sigismund and John of Görlitz; however, once released, the king had Jobst expelled from Prague. Sigismund and Jobst signed a mutual inheritance treaty in 1401, but later again fell out with each other.

After the death of the King of the Romans Rupert III in 1410, Jobst was elected successor by four of the seven prince-electors on 1 October, opposing his cousin Sigismund who had already been elected by three electors on 10 September. The deciding vote came from his cousin Wenceslaus in his capacity as King of Bohemia. Though Jobst had the greater support among the electors, he died on 18 January 1411, possibly having been poisoned, which cleared the way for Sigismund's election as King of the Romans and his later coronation as Holy Roman Emperor in 1433.

== Marriage ==
Jobst married twice:

- Elisabeth of Opole (1360–1374), daughter of Duke Władysław Opolczyk, in 1372.
- Agnes of Opole (d. 1409), daughter of Duke Bolesław (Bolko) II of Opole and sister of Duke Władysław, in 1374.

== Titles ==
- King of the Romans.
- Margrave of Moravia, Lusatia and Brandenburg.
- Elector of Brandenburg
- Duke of Luxembourg.
- Vicarius of Italy.
- Vicarius of the Holy Roman Empire.

== In popular culture ==
A fictionalized Jobst appears in the 2018 video game Kingdom Come: Deliverance. In the game, he is shown with Divish of Talmberg, Hans Capon, Hanush of Leipa, John II of Liechtenstein, and Radzig Kobyla planning on how to defeat Sigismund and free Wenceslaus IV from captivity. Jobst made a further, much more prominent appearance in Kingdom Come: Deliverance 2.

Jobst of Moravia House of Luxemburg
Preceded by John Henry	Margrave of Moravia; 1375–1411	Succeeded by Sigismund
Preceded by Sigismund	Elector of Brandenburg; 1397–1411	Succeeded by Sigismund
Preceded by Rupert	— DISPUTED — King of Germany; 1410–1411; Disputed by Sigismund	Succeeded by Sigismund
Preceded by Wenceslaus II	Duke of Luxembourg; 1388-1411	Succeeded by Elisabeth; Anthony
