= Theodor Lindner =

German historian (1843–1919)

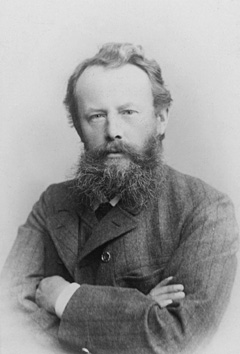
Theodor Lindner

Ernst Friedrich Theodor Lindner (29 May 1843, in Breslau – 24 November 1919, in Halle an der Saale) was a German historian.

He studied history, ancient philology and Sanskrit at the University of Breslau, and at the same time worked as an assistant at the municipal library. He continued his education at the University of Berlin as a student of Johann Gustav Droysen and Leopold von Ranke, and graduated with a dissertation on the Council of Mantua of 1064. In 1868, he qualified as a lecturer at Breslau, and six years later became an associate professor. In 1876 he was named a full professor at the Academy in Münster, where in 1883/84 he served as academic rector. In 1888 he relocated to the University of Halle as successor to Ernst Dümmler.

== Selected works ==
- Anno II. der heilige, Erzbischof von Köln, 1056-–1075, (1869) – Anno II the Holy, Archbishop of Cologne, 1056-1075.
- Geschichte des deutschen Reiches unter König Wenzel (2 volumes, 1875–80) – History of the German Empire under King Wenceslas.
- Die Veme, 1888 – The Vehmic court.
- Deutsche Geschichte unter den Habsburgern und Luxemburgern, 1273–1437, (2 volumes, 1890–93) – German history under the Habsburgs and Luxembourgers, 1273–1437.
- Die deutschen Königswahlen und die Entstehung des Kurfürstenthums, 1893 – The German royal elections and the emergence of the Electorate.
- Geschichte des Deutschen Volkes, (2 volumes, 1894) – History of the German people.
- Die sogenannten Schenkungen Pippins, Karls des Grossen, und Ottos I. an die Päpste, 1896 – The so-called donations of Pepin, Charlemagne and Otto I to the Papacy.
- Zur Fabel von der Bestattung Karls des Grossen, 1896 – On the fable of the funeral of Charlemagne.
- Der Hergang bei den deutschen Königswahlen, 1899 – The course of the German royal elections.
- Geschichtsphilosophie : Einleitung zu einer Weltgeschichte seit der Völkerwanderung, 1901 – Philosophy of history: Introduction to a world history since the Migration Period.
- Die deutsche Hanse. Ihre Geschichte und Bedeutung, 1901 – The German Hanseatic League: Its history and significance.
- Weltgeschichte seit der Völkerwanderung (10 volumes, 1901–21) – World history since the Migration Period.

He was also the author of numerous biographies in the Allgemeine Deutsche Biographie.
