= Wenceslaus IV of Bohemia =

King of Bohemia (1378–1419) and Germany (1376–1400)

Wenceslaus IV
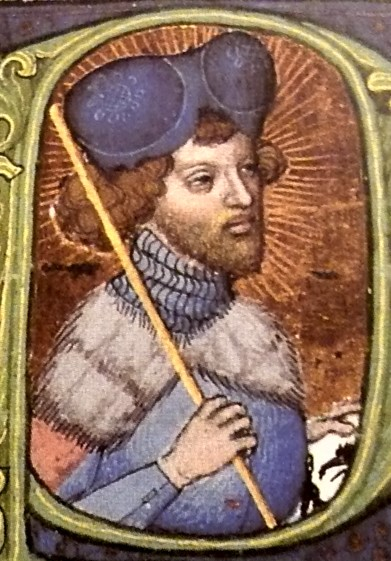
- Detail from the book of hours made for King Wenceslaus, 1400–1419

King of Bohemia
- Reign: 29 November 1378 – 16 August 1419
- Coronation: 15 June 1363; St. Vitus Cathedral, Prague
- Predecessor: Charles IV
- Successor: Sigismund

King of the Romans King of Germany
- Reign: 10 June 1376 – 20 August 1400
- Coronation: 6 July 1376; Aachen Cathedral
- Predecessor: Charles IV
- Successor: Rupert
- Born: 26 February 1361; Nuremberg, Kingdom of Germany, Holy Roman Empire
- Died: 16 August 1419 (aged 58); Kunratice, Prague, Bohemia
- Burial: St. Vitus Cathedral, Prague
- Spouses: Joanna of Bavaria; Sophia of Bavaria
- House: Luxembourg
- Father: Charles IV, Holy Roman Emperor
- Mother: Anna von Schweidnitz

Wenceslaus IV (also spelled Wenceslas; Czech: Václav; German: Wenzel; nicknamed the Idle; also known as Wenceslaus of Luxembourg; 26 February 1361 – 16 August 1419) King of Bohemia from 1378 until his death in 1419 and King of the Romans and King of Germany from 1376 until he was deposed in 1400. A member of the House of Luxembourg, he was the eldest son of Charles IV, Holy Roman Emperor. He also ruled as Duke of Luxembourg (as Wenceslaus II) from 1383 to 1388.

Wenceslaus's reign was marked by conflicts with the Bohemian nobility and struggles over royal authority within the Holy Roman Empire. Opposition from German prince-electors culminated in his deposition as King of the Romans in 1400, although he retained the Bohemian crown. He was subsequently imprisoned by his half-brother Sigismund of Hungary in 1402, but escaped in 1403 and returned to Bohemia.

In religious matters, Wenceslaus joined or became associated with the reform movement surrounding Jan Hus during the Western Schism. Hus's execution at the Council of Constance in 1415 contributed to religious tensions in Bohemia, which intensified after Wenceslaus's death in 1419 and led to the Hussite Wars. Wenceslaus was also a patron of the arts and is associated with the Wenceslas Bible, an illuminated manuscript produced during his reign.

== Biography ==
Wenceslaus was born in the Imperial city of Nuremberg, the son of the Holy Roman Emperor Charles IV by his third wife Anna of Svídnická, a scion of the Silesian Piasts, and baptized at St. Sebaldus Church. He was raised by the Prague Archbishops Arnošt of Pardubice and Jan Očko of Vlašim. His father had the two-year-old crowned King of Bohemia on 15 June 1363 and in 1373 also obtained for him the Electoral Margraviate of Brandenburg. When on 10 June 1376 Charles IV asserted Wenceslaus' election as King of the Romans by the prince-electors, two of seven votes, those of Brandenburg and Bohemia, were held by the emperor and his son themselves. Wenceslaus was crowned at Aachen on 6 July.

In order to secure the election of his son, Charles IV revoked the privileges of many Imperial Cities that he had earlier granted and mortgaged them to various nobles. The cities, however, were not powerless, and as executors of the public peace, they had developed into a potent military force. Moreover, as Charles IV had organized the cities into leagues, he had made it possible for them to cooperate in large-scale endeavors. Indeed, on 4 July 1376, fourteen Swabian cities bound together into the independent Swabian League of Cities to defend their rights against the newly elected King, attacking the lands of Eberhard II, Count of Württemberg. The city league soon attracted other members and until 1389 acted as an autonomous state within the Holy Roman Empire.

=== Rule ===
Wenceslaus took some part in government during his father's lifetime, and on Charles' death in 1378, he inherited the Crown of Bohemia and as king assumed the government of the Holy Roman Empire. In the cathedral of Monza there is preserved a series of reliefs depicting the coronations of the kings of Italy with the Iron Crown of Lombardy. The seventh of these depicts Wenceslaus being crowned in the presence of six electors, he himself being the seventh. The depiction is probably not accurate and was likely made solely to reinforce the claims of the cathedral on the custody of the Iron Crown.

In 1387 a quarrel between Frederick, Duke of Bavaria, and the cities of the Swabian League allied with the Archbishop of Salzburg gave the signal for a general war in Swabia, in which the cities, weakened by their isolation, mutual jealousies, and internal conflicts, were defeated by the forces of Eberhard II, Count of Württemberg, at Döffingen, near Grafenau, on 24 August 1388. The cities were taken severely and devastated. Most of them quietly acquiesced when King Wenceslaus proclaimed an ambivalent arrangement at Cheb (Eger) in 1389 that prohibited all leagues between cities while confirming their political autonomy. This settlement provided a modicum of stability for the next several decades, however, the cities dropped out as a basis of the central Imperial authority.

=== King of Bohemia ===
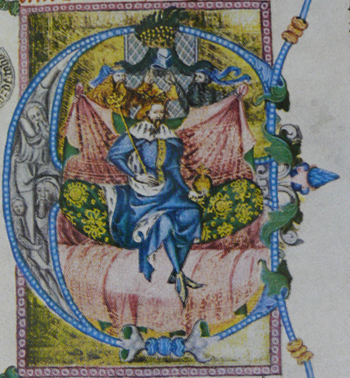
King Wenceslaus depicted in his Bible (the so-called Wenceslas Bible, late 14th century)

During his long reign, Wenceslaus held a tenuous grip on power at best, as he came into repeated conflicts with the Bohemian nobility led by the House of Rosenberg. On two occasions he was even imprisoned for lengthy spells by rebellious nobles during the Moravian Margrave Wars.

But the greatest liability for Wenceslaus proved to be his own family. Charles IV had divided his holdings among his sons and other relatives. Although Wenceslaus upon his father's death retained Bohemia, his younger half brother Sigismund inherited Brandenburg, while John received the newly established Duchy of Görlitz in Upper Lusatia. The March of Moravia was divided between his cousins Jobst and Procopius, and his uncle Wenceslaus I had already been made Duke of Luxembourg. Hence the young king was left without the resources his father had enjoyed, although he inherited the Duchy of Luxembourg from his uncle in 1383. In 1386, Sigismund became King of Hungary through marriage with the Queen of Hungary Maria of Anjou and became involved in affairs further east.

Wenceslaus also faced serious opposition from the Bohemian nobles and even from his chancellor, the Archbishop of Prague Jan of Jenštejn. In a conflict surrounding the investiture of the abbot of Kladruby, the torture and murder of the archbishop's vicar-general Saint John of Nepomuk by royal officials in 1393 sparked a noble rebellion. In 1394 Wenceslaus' cousin Jobst of Moravia was named regent, while Wenceslaus was arrested at Králův Dvůr. King Sigismund of Hungary arranged a truce in 1396, and for his efforts, he was recognized as heir to Wenceslaus.

In the Papal Schism, Wenceslaus supported the Roman Pope Urban VI. As the King of Bohemia, he sought to protect the religious reformer Jan Hus and his followers against the demands of the Catholic Church for their suppression as heretics. Hus and his followers drove German academics from the University of Prague, who then set up their own university at Leipzig, through the Decree of Kutná Hora in 1409.

He then met King Charles VI of France at Reims, where the two monarchs decided to persuade the rival popes, now Avignonian Antipope Benedict XIII and Roman Pope Boniface IX, to resign, and to end the papal schisms by the election of a new pontiff. Many of the princes were angry at this abandonment of Boniface by Wenceslaus, who had also aroused much indignation by his long absence from Germany and by selling the title of Duke of Milan to Gian Galeazzo Visconti.

Hus was eventually executed in Konstanz in 1415 by the Council of Constance, and the rest of Wenceslaus' reign in Bohemia featured precursors of the Hussite Wars that would follow his death.

=== Dethronement in 1400 ===
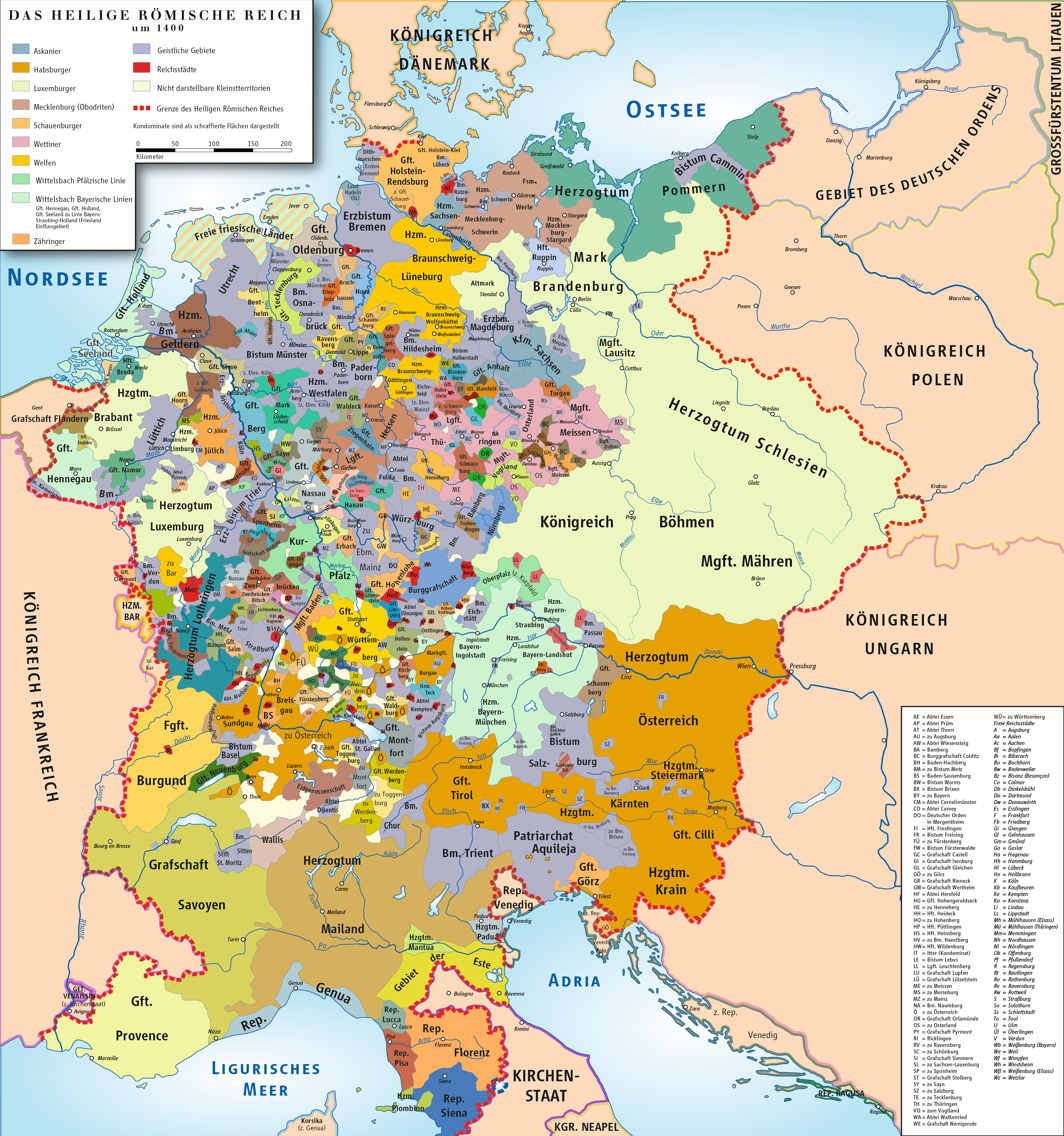
Map of the Holy Roman Empire in 1400

In view of his troubles in Bohemia, Wenceslaus did not seek a coronation ceremony as Holy Roman Emperor. Consequently, he faced anger at the Reichstag diets of Nuremberg (1397) and Frankfurt (1398). The four Rhenish electors, Count Palatine Rupert and the archbishops of Mainz, Cologne and Trier, accused him of failing to maintain the public peace or to resolve the Schism. They demanded that Wenceslaus appear before them in Oberlahnstein to answer to the charges in June 1400.

Wenceslaus demurred, in large part because of renewed hostilities in Bohemia. When he failed to appear, the electors meeting at Lahneck Castle declared him deposed from the title King of the Romans on 20 August 1400 on account of "futility, idleness, negligence and ignobility". They concluded that they were relieved of their oaths to Wenceslas, using the Golden Bull of 1356 as justification for their defection. They claimed that, because the electors had the right to elect the Emperor, they also had the right to depose of an ineffectual monarch. The next day they chose the Count Palatine Rupert as the King of the Romans at Rhens. Although Wenceslaus refused to acknowledge this successor's decade-long reign, he made no move against Rupert. Shortly after, the Bohemian Palatinate also fell into Rupert's hands.

On 29 June 1402, Wenceslaus was captured by Sigismund, King of Hungary, who at first intended to escort him to Rome to have him crowned Holy Roman Emperor, but Rupert III heard of this plan and tried to prevent the passage to Italy, so Sigismund had Wenceslaus imprisoned, at first in Schaumberg and from 16 August in Vienna, in the charge of William, Duke of Austria. On 20 November, Wenceslaus was forced to sign his renunciation of all his powers to Sigismund and the Dukes of Austria. In exchange, the conditions of his imprisonment were relaxed. In early 1403, Rupert made diplomatic overtures to Sigismund, attempting to get him to forgo his attempt to secure the imperial crown, but Sigismund invaded Bohemia with Hungarian forces, looting, imposing heavy taxes, and persecuting the supporters of Wenceslaus. He also plundered the royal treasury to pay for his military campaigns against the supporters of Rupert III and of Jobst of Moravia. An armistice between Sigismund and Jobst was agreed to be in effect from 14 April until 20 May. This gave Sigismund's opponents time to prepare, and after the end of the armistice, Sigismund could make no further gains and retreated from Bohemia, reaching Bratislava on 24 July. On 1 October 1403, Pope Boniface IX finally acknowledged the deposition of Wenceslaus and the election of Rupert as King of the Romans. As a coronation of Wenceslaus was now no longer a possibility, and while he was nominally still prisoner in Vienna, he was no longer under strict guard, and he managed to escape on 11 November. He crossed the Danube and was escorted by John II of Liechtenstein via Mikulov back to Bohemia, meeting his supporters in Kutná Hora before moving on Prague, which he entered on Christmas.

Among the charges raised by Rupert as the basis for his predecessor's deposition was the Papal Schism. King Rupert III called the Council of Pisa in 1409, attended by defectors from both papal parties. They elected Antipope Alexander V, worsening the situation because he was not acknowledged by his two rivals, and from 1409 to 1417 there were three popes: Avignon, Pisa and Rome.

After the death of Rupert in 1410, his succession at first proved difficult since both Wenceslaus's cousin Jobst of Moravia and Wenceslaus's brother Sigismund of Hungary were elected King of the Romans. Wenceslaus himself had never recognized his deposition and hence still claimed the kingship. Jobst died in 1411, and Wenceslaus agreed to give up the crown, so long as he could keep Bohemia. This settled the issue, and after 1411, Sigismund reigned as king (in which Wencesclaus himself and all six other prince-electors elected) and later also crowned Holy Roman Emperor by Pope Eugene IV in 1433.

The bishops and secular leaders, tired of the Western Schism, supported Sigismund when he called the Council of Constance in 1414. The goal of the council was to reform the Church in head and members. In 1417, the council deposed all three popes and elected a new one. By resolving the schism, Sigismund restored the honour of the imperial title and made himself the most influential monarch in the West.

== Personal life ==
Modern sarcophagus of Wenceslaus IV of Bohemia in St. Vitus Cathedral in Prague

Wenceslaus was married twice, first to Joanna of Bavaria, a scion of the Wittelsbach dynasty, on 29 September 1370. Joanna died on 31 December 1386 from chronic lung disease, most likely tuberculosis. Wenceslaus married her first cousin once removed, Sofia of Bavaria, on 2 May 1389. He had no children by either wife.

Wenceslaus was described as a man of great knowledge and is known for the Wenceslas Bible, a richly illuminated manuscript he had drawn up between 1390 and 1400. However, his rule remained uncertain, varying between idleness and cruel measures as in the case of John of Nepomuk. Unlike his father, Wenceslaus relied on favouritism, which made him abhorrent to many nobles and led to increasing isolation. Moreover, he probably suffered from alcoholism, which was brought to light in 1398 when he was unable to accept an invitation by King Charles VI of France for a reception at Reims due to his drunkenness.

Wenceslaus died in 1419 of a heart attack during a hunt in the woods surrounding his castle Nový Hrad at Kunratice (today a part of Prague), leaving the country in a deep political crisis. His death was followed by 15 years of conflict called the Hussite Wars, which were centred on greater calls for religious reform by Jan Hus and spurred by popular outrage provoked by his execution.

== In popular culture ==
The 2018 video game Kingdom Come: Deliverance, along with its 2025 sequel, Kingdom Come: Deliverance II, developed by Warhorse Studios, are set in Bohemia during the reign of King Wenceslaus IV in the year 1403. The main character, Henry of Skalitz, becomes involved in a plot to restore Wenceslaus to the Bohemian throne after the King of Hungary, Sigismund, invades Bohemia to claim the throne and uses Cumans, hired mercenaries, and the Praguers, to pillage land and convince Lords in Bohemia to side with him.

== See also ==
- List of rulers of Bohemia
- Kings of Germany family tree
- Decree of Kutná Hora

== Sources ==
- Czechowicz, Bogusław (2021). "Sources and Ways of Wrocław's Promotion in the Structures of the Bohemian Crown in the Luxembourg Era: Polemic Recapitulation". The City and History. 10 (2): 6–36. doi:10.33542/CAH2021-2-01.
- Chisholm, Hugh, ed. (1911). "Wenceslaus" . Encyclopædia Britannica. Vol. 28 (11th ed.). Cambridge University Press. pp. 517–518.
- Theodor Lindner. Deutsche Geschichte unter den Habsburgern und Luxemburgern. Vol. II. Stuttgart, 1893.
- Theodor Lindner (1896). "Wenzel" . Allgemeine Deutsche Biographie (in German). Vol. 41. Leipzig: Duncker & Humblot. pp. 726–732.
- Marco Innocenti (2005). "Wenzel IV.". In Bautz, Traugott (ed.). Biographisch-Bibliographisches Kirchenlexikon (BBKL) (in German). Vol. 24. Nordhausen: Bautz. cols. 1521–1531. ISBN 3-88309-247-9.

Wenceslaus IV of Bohemia House of Luxembourg Born: 26 February 1361 Died: 16 August 1419
Regnal titles
| Preceded by Charles IV | German King; 1376–1400 | Succeeded by Rupert |
| Preceded by Charles IV | King of Bohemia; 1378–1419 | Succeeded by Sigismund |
| Preceded by Otto VII | Elector of Brandenburg; 1373–1378 | Succeeded by Sigismund |
| Preceded by Wenceslaus I | Duke of Luxembourg; 1383–1388 | Succeeded by Jobst |
