= Bolkow =

Bolkow may refer to:

- Bölkow, a German aircraft manufacturer based in Stuttgart
- Bolków, a town in south-west Poland
- Bolków, Łódź Voivodeship, a village in central Poland
- Bolków, West Pomeranian Voivodeship, a village in northwest Poland
