= Rudlice, Poland =

Rudlice
- Village
- Location within Poland
- Coordinates: 51°20′N 18°38′E
- Country: Poland
- Voivodeship: Łódź
- County: Wieluń
- Gmina: Ostrówek

Rudlice [rudˈlit͡sɛ] is a village in the administrative district of Gmina Ostrówek, within Wieluń County, Łódź Voivodeship, in central Poland.
