= Klasak Mały =

Settlement in Gmina Skomlin, Poland

- Settlement
- Location within Poland
- Coordinates: 51°10′46″N 18°21′10″E
- Country: Poland
- Voivodeship: Łódź
- County: Wieluń
- Gmina: Skomlin

Klasak Mały [ˈklasak ˈmawɨ] is a settlement in the administrative district of Gmina Skomlin, within Wieluń County, Łódź Voivodeship, in central Poland.
