= Chotów =

Chotów may refer to the following places:

- Chotów, Greater Poland Voivodeship (west-central Poland)
- Chotów, Łódź Voivodeship (central Poland)
- Chotów, Świętokrzyskie Voivodeship (south-central Poland)
