= Budziaki, Łódź Voivodeship =

Budziaki
- Settlement
- Location within Poland
- Coordinates: 51°6′51″N 18°34′38″E
- Country: Poland
- Voivodeship: Łódź
- County: Wieluń
- Gmina: Pątnów

Budziaki [buˈd͡ʑaki] is a settlement in the administrative district of Gmina Pątnów, within Wieluń County, Łódź Voivodeship, in central Poland.
