= Orzechowiec =

- Village
- Location within Poland
- Coordinates: 51°8′42″N 18°26′51″E
- Country: Poland
- Voivodeship: Łódź
- County: Wieluń
- Gmina: Mokrsko

Orzechowiec [ɔʐɛˈxɔvjɛt͡s] is a village in the administrative district of Gmina Mokrsko, within Wieluń County, Łódź Voivodeship, in central Poland.
