= Malinówka =

Malinówka may refer to the following places:

- Malinówka, Łódź Voivodeship (central Poland)
- Malinówka, Chełm County in Lublin Voivodeship (east Poland)
- Malinówka, Podlaskie Voivodeship (north-east Poland)
- Malinówka, Łęczna County in Lublin Voivodeship (east Poland)
- Malinówka, Zamość County in Lublin Voivodeship (east Poland)
- Malinówka, Subcarpathian Voivodeship (south-east Poland)
- Malinówka, Masovian Voivodeship (east-central Poland)

== See also ==
- Malinovka (disambiguation)
