= Bukowce, Łódź Voivodeship =

Bukowce
- Settlement
- Location within Poland
- Coordinates: 51°6′N 18°43′E
- Country: Poland
- Voivodeship: Łódź
- County: Wieluń
- Gmina: Pątnów

Bukowce (Polish pronunciation: [buˈkɔft͡sɛ]) is a settlement in the administrative district of Gmina Pątnów, within Wieluń County, Łódź Voivodeship, in central Poland.
