= Klasak Duży =

- Village
- Location within Poland
- Coordinates: 51°11′36″N 18°21′10″E
- Country: Poland
- Voivodeship: Łódź
- County: Wieluń
- Gmina: Skomlin

Klasak Duży [ˈklasak ˈduʐɨ] is a village in the administrative district of Gmina Skomlin, within Wieluń County, Łódź Voivodeship, in central Poland.
