= Jackowskie =

- Village
- Location within Poland
- Coordinates: 51°20′23″N 18°39′45″E
- Country: Poland
- Voivodeship: Łódź
- County: Wieluń
- Gmina: Ostrówek
- Population: 20

Jackowskie [jat͡sˈkɔfskʲɛ] is a village in the administrative district of Gmina Ostrówek, within Wieluń County, Łódź Voivodeship, in central Poland.
