= Nowa Wieś, Wieluń County =

Nowa Wieś
- Village
- Location within Poland
- Coordinates: 51°16′57″N 18°45′40″E
- Country: Poland
- Voivodeship: Łódź
- County: Wieluń
- Gmina: Osjaków
- Time zone: UTC+1 (CET)
  - Summer (DST): UTC+2 (CEST)
- Vehicle registration: EWI

Nowa Wieś [ˈnɔva ˈvjɛɕ] is a village in the administrative district of Gmina Osjaków, within Wieluń County, Łódź Voivodeship, in south-central Poland.

== History ==
The territory became a part of the emerging Polish state in the 10th century. Nowa Wieś was a private village of Polish nobility, including the Stawski and Starzeński families, administratively located in the Sieradz Voivodeship in the Greater Poland Province.

In 1827, it had a population of 120.

During the German occupation of Poland (World War II), in 1940, the German gendarmerie carried out expulsions of Poles, who were placed in a transit camp in Łódź, and then young Poles were deported to forced labour in Germany and German-occupied France, and others were deported to the General Government in the more eastern part of German-occupied Poland. Houses and farms of expelled Poles were handed over to German colonists as part of the Lebensraum policy.
