= Stawek =

Stawek may refer to the following places:

- Stawek, Łódź Voivodeship (central Poland)
- Stawek, Gmina Cyców in Lublin Voivodeship (east Poland)
- Stawek, Gmina Spiczyn in Lublin Voivodeship (east Poland)
- Stawek, Masovian Voivodeship (east-central Poland)
- Stawek, Warmian-Masurian Voivodeship (north Poland)
