= Felinów, Łódź Voivodeship =

Felinów
- Village
- Location within Poland
- Coordinates: 51°16′20″N 18°47′16″E
- Country: Poland
- Voivodeship: Łódź
- County: Wieluń
- Gmina: Osjaków

Felinów [fɛˈlinuf] is a village in the administrative district of Gmina Osjaków, within Wieluń County, Łódź Voivodeship, in central Poland.
