= Kolonia Raducka =

- Village
- Location within Poland
- Coordinates: 51°15′45″N 18°45′31″E
- Country: Poland
- Voivodeship: Łódź
- County: Wieluń
- Gmina: Osjaków

Kolonia Raducka [kɔˈlɔɲa raˈdut͡ska] is a village in the administrative district of Gmina Osjaków, within Wieluń County, Łódź Voivodeship, in central Poland.
