= Wrońsko =

- Village
- Location within Poland
- Coordinates: 51°23′N 18°51′E
- Country: Poland
- Voivodeship: Łódź
- County: Wieluń
- Gmina: Konopnica
- Population: 390

Wrońsko [ˈvrɔɲskɔ] is a village in the administrative district of Gmina Konopnica, within Wieluń County, Łódź Voivodeship, in central Poland.
