= Emanuelina =

- Village
- Location within Poland
- Coordinates: 51°18′N 18°34′E
- Country: Poland
- Voivodeship: Łódź
- County: Wieluń
- Gmina: Czarnożyły

Emanuelina [ɛmanuɛˈlina] is a village in the administrative district of Gmina Czarnożyły, within Wieluń County, Łódź Voivodeship, in central Poland.
