= Piaski, Gmina Konopnica =

Piaski
- Village
- Location within Poland
- Coordinates: 51°22′44″N 18°52′57″E
- Country: Poland
- Voivodeship: Łódź
- County: Wieluń
- Gmina: Konopnica
- Time zone: UTC+1 (CET)
  - Summer (DST): UTC+2 (CEST)
- Postal code: 98-313
- Vehicle registration: EWI

Piaski (Polish pronunciation: [ˈpjaskʲi]) is a village in the administrative district of Gmina Konopnica, within Wieluń County, Łódź Voivodeship, in central Poland.
