= Kąty, Wieluń County =

Kąty
- Village
- Location within Poland
- Coordinates: 51°17′46″N 18°30′52″E
- Country: Poland
- Voivodeship: Łódź
- County: Wieluń
- Gmina: Czarnożyły

Kąty [ˈkɔntɨ] is a village in the administrative district of Gmina Czarnożyły, within Wieluń County, Łódź Voivodeship, in central Poland.
