= Jasna Góra (disambiguation) =

Jasna Góra (meaning "bright hill") may refer to the following places in Poland:

- Jasna Góra Monastery, an important pilgrimage site in Częstochowa
- Jasna Góra, Lower Silesian Voivodeship (south-west Poland)
- Jasna Góra, Łódź Voivodeship (central Poland)
