= Raducki Folwark =

- Village
- Location within Poland
- Coordinates: 51°16′N 18°45′E
- Country: Poland
- Voivodeship: Łódź
- County: Wieluń
- Gmina: Osjaków

Raducki Folwark [raˈdut͡ski ˈfɔlvark] is a village in the administrative district of Gmina Osjaków, within Wieluń County, Łódź Voivodeship, in central Poland.
