= Wydrzyn, Wieluń County =

Wydrzyn
- Village
- Location within Poland
- Coordinates: 51°16′11″N 18°33′47″E
- Country: Poland
- Voivodeship: Łódź
- County: Wieluń
- Gmina: Czarnożyły

Wydrzyn [ˈvɨdʐɨn] is a village in the administrative district of Gmina Czarnożyły, within Wieluń County, Łódź Voivodeship, in central Poland.
