= Janów, Wieluń County =

Janów
- Village
- Location within Poland
- Coordinates: 51°22′2″N 18°36′30″E
- Country: Poland
- Voivodeship: Łódź
- County: Wieluń
- Gmina: Ostrówek

Janów [ˈjanuf] is a village in the administrative district of Gmina Ostrówek, within Wieluń County, Łódź Voivodeship, in central Poland.
