= Mała Wieś, Wieluń County =

Mała Wieś
- Village
- Location within Poland
- Coordinates: 51°23′50″N 18°48′2″E
- Country: Poland
- Voivodeship: Łódź
- County: Wieluń
- Gmina: Konopnica

Mała Wieś [ˈmawa ˈvjɛɕ] is a village in the administrative district of Gmina Konopnica, within Wieluń County, Łódź Voivodeship, in central Poland.
