= Słupsko, Łódź Voivodeship =

Motorowa
- Town
- Location within Poland
- Coordinates: 51°11′44″N 18°26′8″E
- Country: Poland
- Voivodeship: Łódź
- County: Wieluń
- Gmina: Mokrsko

Słupsko [ˈswupskɔ] is a village in the administrative district of Gmina Mokrsko, within Wieluń County, Łódź Voivodeship, in central Poland.
