= Okalew, Łódź Voivodeship =

Okalew
- Village
- Location within Poland
- Coordinates: 51°19′55″N 18°34′31″E
- Country: Poland
- Voivodeship: Łódź
- County: Wieluń
- Gmina: Ostrówek
- Population: 530

Okalew [ɔˈkalɛf] is a village in the administrative district of Gmina Ostrówek, within Wieluń County, Łódź Voivodeship, in central Poland.
