= Brzeziny, Gmina Mokrsko =

Brzeziny
- Village
- Location within Poland
- Coordinates: 51°9′29″N 18°31′34″E
- Country: Poland
- Voivodeship: Łódź
- County: Wieluń
- Gmina: Mokrsko

Brzeziny [bʐɛˈʑinɨ] is a village in the administrative district of Gmina Mokrsko, within Wieluń County, Łódź Voivodeship, in central Poland.
