= Cieśle, Wieluń County =

Cieśle
- Settlement
- Location within Poland
- Coordinates: 51°5′5″N 18°44′38″E
- Country: Poland
- Voivodeship: Łódź
- County: Wieluń
- Gmina: Pątnów

Cieśle [ˈt͡ɕɛɕlɛ] is a settlement in the administrative district of Gmina Pątnów, within Wieluń County, Łódź Voivodeship, in central Poland.
