= Kuźnica, Wieluń County =

Kuźnica
- Village
- Location within Poland
- Coordinates: 51°21′10″N 18°40′38″E
- Country: Poland
- Voivodeship: Łódź
- County: Wieluń
- Gmina: Ostrówek
- Population: 40

Kuźnica (Polish pronunciation: [kuʑˈɲit͡sa]) is a village in the administrative district of Gmina Ostrówek, within Wieluń County, Łódź Voivodeship, in central Poland.
