= Ług, Łódź Voivodeship =

Ług
- Settlement
- Location within Poland
- Coordinates: 51°08′17″N 18°21′42″E
- Country: Poland
- Voivodeship: Łódź
- County: Wieluń
- Gmina: Skomlin

Ług [wuk] is a settlement in the administrative district of Gmina Skomlin, within Wieluń County, Łódź Voivodeship, in central Poland.
