= Anielin, Wieluń County =

Anielin
- Village
- Location within Poland
- Coordinates: 51°19′35″N 18°51′35″E
- Country: Poland
- Voivodeship: Łódź
- County: Wieluń
- Gmina: Konopnica

Anielin [aˈɲɛlin] is a village in the administrative district of Gmina Konopnica, within Wieluń County, Łódź Voivodeship, in central Poland.
