= Stanisławów, Wieluń County =

Stanisławów
- Village
- Location within Poland
- Coordinates: 51°08′00″N 18°29′12″E
- Country: Poland
- Voivodeship: Łódź
- County: Wieluń
- Gmina: Mokrsko

Stanisławów [staniˈswavuf] is a village in the administrative district of Gmina Mokrsko, within Wieluń County, Łódź Voivodeship, in central Poland.
