= Mokrsko-Osiedle =

- Village
- Location within Poland
- Coordinates: 51°10′21″N 18°28′20″E
- Country: Poland
- Voivodeship: Łódź
- County: Wieluń
- Gmina: Mokrsko

Mokrsko-Osiedle [ˈmɔkrskɔ ɔˈɕɛdlɛ] is a village in the administrative district of Gmina Mokrsko, within Wieluń County, Łódź Voivodeship, in central Poland.
