= Kuźnica Strobińska =

- Village
- Location within Poland
- Coordinates: 51°17′35″N 18°50′13″E
- Country: Poland
- Voivodeship: Łódź
- County: Wieluń
- Gmina: Osjaków
- Population (approx.): 130
- Time zone: UTC+1 (CET)
  - Summer (DST): UTC+2 (CEST)
- Vehicle registration: EWI

Kuźnica Strobińska (Polish pronunciation: [kuʑˈɲit͡sa strɔˈbij̃ska]) is a village in the administrative district of Gmina Osjaków, within Wieluń County, Łódź Voivodeship, in central Poland.

== History ==
During the German occupation of Poland (World War II), in 1940, the German gendarmerie carried out expulsions of Poles, who were placed in a transit camp in Łódź, and then young Poles were deported to forced labour in Germany and German-occupied France, and others were deported to the General Government in the more eastern part of German-occupied Poland. Houses and farms of expelled Poles were handed over to German colonists as part of the Lebensraum policy.
