= Leniszki =

- Village
- Location within Poland
- Coordinates: 51°18′21″N 18°33′0″E
- Country: Poland
- Voivodeship: Łódź
- County: Wieluń
- Gmina: Czarnożyły
- Population: 90

Leniszki [lɛˈniʂki] is a village in the administrative district of Gmina Czarnożyły, within Wieluń County, Łódź Voivodeship, in central Poland.
