= Poręby, Wieluń County =

Poręby
- Village
- Location within Poland
- Coordinates: 51°8′30″N 18°26′27″E
- Country: Poland
- Voivodeship: Łódź
- County: Wieluń
- Gmina: Mokrsko

Poręby [pɔˈrɛmbɨ] is a village in the administrative district of Gmina Mokrsko, within Wieluń County, Łódź Voivodeship, in central Poland.
