= Załęcze Małe =

- Village
- Location within Poland
- Coordinates: 51°5′N 18°43′E
- Country: Poland
- Voivodeship: Łódź
- County: Wieluń
- Gmina: Pątnów
- Website: http://zaleczemale.wielun.pl

Załęcze Małe [zaˈwɛnt͡ʂɛ ˈmawɛ] is a village in the administrative district of Gmina Pątnów, within Wieluń County, Łódź Voivodeship, in central Poland.
