= Sabinów, Wieluń County =

Sabinów
- Village
- Location within Poland
- Coordinates: 51°20′28″N 18°50′42″E
- Country: Poland
- Voivodeship: Łódź
- County: Wieluń
- Gmina: Konopnica
- Population: 80

Sabinów [saˈbinuf] is a village in the administrative district of Gmina Konopnica, within Wieluń County, Łódź Voivodeship, in central Poland.
