= Pątnów, Łódź Voivodeship =

Pątnów
- Village
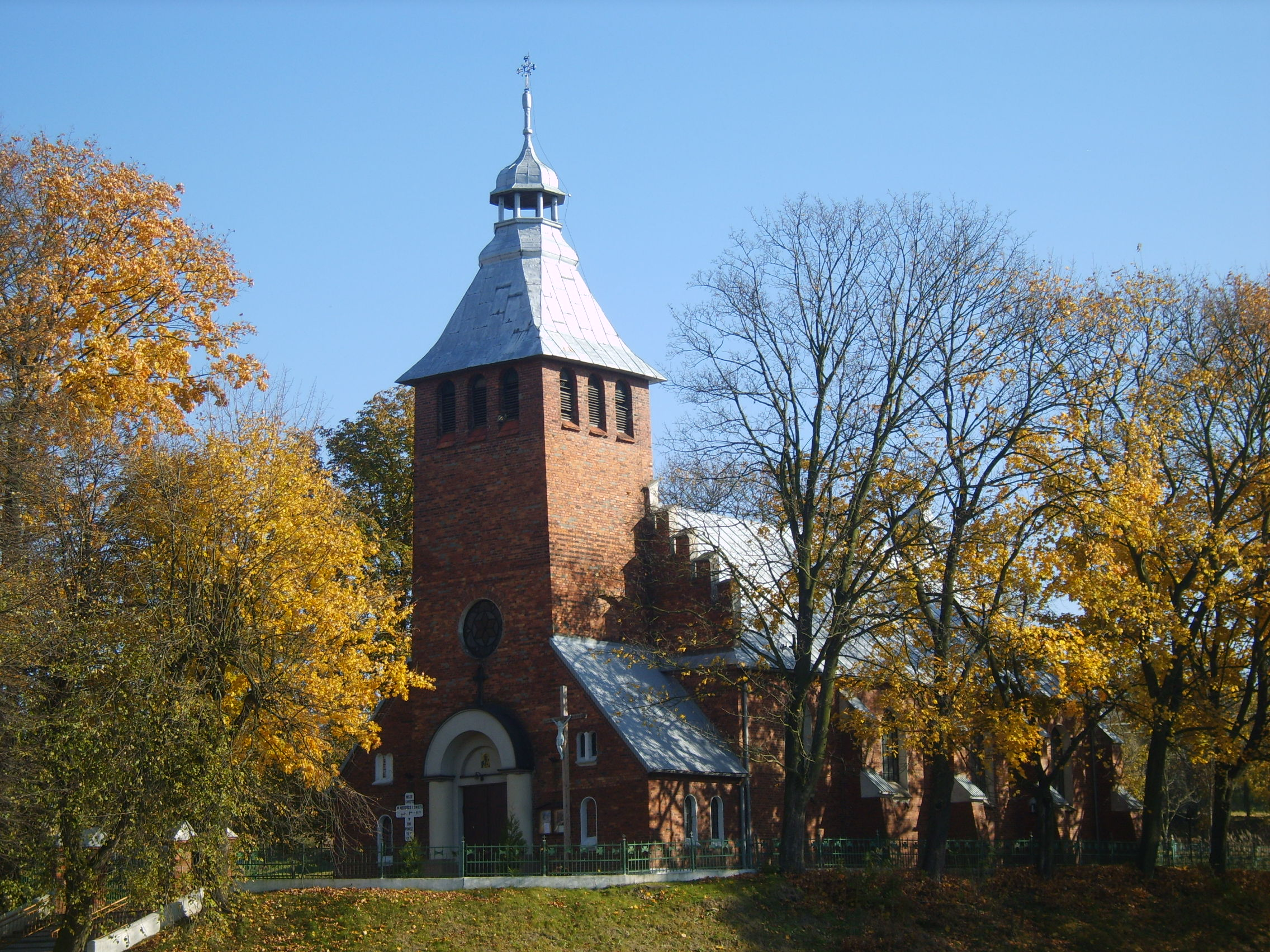
- Saint John the Apostle church in Pątnów

- Location within Poland
- Coordinates: 51°8′53″N 18°37′9″E
- Country: Poland
- Voivodeship: Łódź
- County: Wieluń
- Gmina: Pątnów
- Population (approx.): 1,400
- Time zone: UTC+1 (CET)
  - Summer (DST): UTC+2 (CEST)
- Vehicle registration: EWI

Pątnów [ˈpɔntnuf] is a village in Wieluń County, Łódź Voivodeship, in south-central Poland. It is the seat of the gmina (administrative district) called Gmina Pątnów.

== History ==
Its name appears in the written records also as Patnowo, Pantchanow. In 1339 local wójt Stanimir exchanged the slaughterhouse in Wieluń for a mill and a quarter łan of land in Pątnów. In 1553 it is mentioned that the wooden church existed already at the beginning of the 16th century. It was possibly funded by one Polish kings. The local Catholic parish included Pątnów and nearby Bieniec. In those times the village belonged partly to Wieluń and partly to nobleman Mateusz Skrzyński.

Following the Second Partition of Poland, in 1793, it was annexed by Prussia. At the beginning of the 19th century a small landed estate of about 80 ha changed the owners for Germans- the Kreczmers. In 1807, the village became a part of the short-lived Polish Duchy of Warsaw, and following its dissolution in 1815, it fell to the Russian Partition of Poland. At the beginning of 20th century there were a distillery, a manufacture of starch, ponds and a park (1.08 ha) founded by the Kreczmers. Before World War I the landed estate was bought by Kobylański, the former leaseholder of an estate in Bieniec. On the village grounds there were “Osada Młyńska” (“The Mill Settlement”), although there wasn't any mill and so called “Jatka”- with reference to Janina Szymańska's estate, which had existed here in the past. In 1926 the railway stop was built.

During the German occupation of Poland (World War II), in 1940, the German gendarmerie carried out expulsions of Poles, who were placed in a transit camp in Łódź, and then young Poles were deported to forced labour in Germany and German-occupied France, and others were deported to the General Government in the more eastern part of German-occupied Poland. Houses and farms were handed over to German colonists from Volhynia as part of the Lebensraum policy. Every German family got three Polish farms. The name of the village was Germanized to Patenau.

After the war, the former manor farms' terrain was taken over by Gminna Spółdzielnia (The Commune Association), which has devastated previous manor order.

== Transport ==
The village is cut through by the Polish National road 43 connecting Częstochowa and Wieluń and by the railway line 181 connecting Herby Nowe and Wieluń Dąbrowa. There is a station for passenger trains.

== Church and Chapel ==
The present Church was built in 1917–1927 on the place of the former wooden church. On the rood beam there is a baroque crucifix from 18th century. There is also a font from 18th century. On the village's terrain there is a beautiful stone chapel from 18th century. It is covered by a four-sided tent roof. Inside there is a historic sculpture of Pensive Christ.
