= Komorniki, Wieluń County =

Komorniki
- Village
- Location within Poland
- Coordinates: 51°9′6″N 18°27′50″E
- Country: Poland
- Voivodeship: Łódź
- County: Wieluń
- Gmina: Mokrsko

Komorniki [kɔmɔrˈniki] is a village in the administrative district of Gmina Mokrsko, within Wieluń County, Łódź Voivodeship, in central Poland.
