= Jeziorko, Wieluń County =

Jeziorko
- Village
- Location within Poland
- Coordinates: 51°9′23″N 18°27′37″E
- Country: Poland
- Voivodeship: Łódź
- County: Wieluń
- Gmina: Mokrsko

Jeziorko [jɛˈʑɔrkɔ] is a village in the administrative district of Gmina Mokrsko, within Wieluń County, Łódź Voivodeship, in central Poland.
