= Działy, Wieluń County =

Działy
- Village
- Location within Poland
- Coordinates: 51°18′1″N 18°35′0″E
- Country: Poland
- Voivodeship: Łódź
- County: Wieluń
- Gmina: Czarnożyły

Działy [ˈd͡ʑawɨ] is a village in the administrative district of Gmina Czarnożyły, within Wieluń County, Łódź Voivodeship, in central Poland.
