= Szynkielów =

- Village
- Location within Poland
- Coordinates: 51°21′4″N 18°45′27″E
- Country: Poland
- Voivodeship: Łódź
- County: Wieluń
- Gmina: Konopnica
- Population: 860
- Website: http://www.szynkielow.amr.pl

Szynkielów [ʂɨŋˈkʲɛluf] is a village in the administrative district of Gmina Konopnica, within Wieluń County, Łódź Voivodeship, in central Poland.
