= Raduczyce =

- Village
- Location within Poland
- Coordinates: 51°15′N 18°48′E
- Country: Poland
- Voivodeship: Łódź
- County: Wieluń
- Gmina: Osjaków
- Elevation: 230 m (750 ft)
- Population: 250

Raduczyce [raduˈt͡ʂɨt͡sɛ] is a village in the administrative district of Gmina Osjaków, within Wieluń County, Łódź Voivodeship, in central Poland.
