= Skrzynno, Łódź Voivodeship =

Skrzynno
- Village
- Location within Poland
- Coordinates: 51°18′53″N 18°39′28″E
- Country: Poland
- Voivodeship: Łódź
- County: Wieluń
- Gmina: Ostrówek
- Population: 770

Skrzynno [ˈskʂɨnnɔ] is a village in the administrative district of Gmina Ostrówek, within Wieluń County, Łódź Voivodeship, in central Poland.
