= Smugi, Łódź Voivodeship =

Smugi
- Settlement
- Location within Poland
- Coordinates: 51°8′19″N 18°26′0″E
- Country: Poland
- Voivodeship: Łódź
- County: Wieluń
- Gmina: Skomlin

Smugi [ˈsmuɡi] is a settlement in the administrative district of Gmina Skomlin, within Wieluń County, Łódź Voivodeship, in central Poland.
