= Niemierzyn, Łódź Voivodeship =

Niemierzyn
- Village
- Location within Poland
- Coordinates: 51°18′15″N 18°36′15″E
- Country: Poland
- Voivodeship: Łódź
- County: Wieluń
- Gmina: Ostrówek
- Website: www.radiozw.com.pl

Niemierzyn [ɲɛˈmjɛʐɨn] is a village in the administrative district of Gmina Ostrówek, within Wieluń County, Łódź Voivodeship, in central Poland.
