= Wróblew, Wieluń County =

Wróblew
- Village
- Location within Poland
- Coordinates: 51°8′42″N 18°24′23″E
- Country: Poland
- Voivodeship: Łódź
- County: Wieluń
- Gmina: Skomlin

Wróblew [ˈvrublɛf] is a village in the administrative district of Gmina Skomlin, within Wieluń County, Łódź Voivodeship, in central Poland.
