= Czernice =

Czernice may refer to the following places:

- Czernice, Łódź Voivodeship (south-central Poland)
- Czernice, Masovian Voivodeship (north-central Poland)
- Czernice, Podlaskie Voivodeship (north-east Poland)
- Czernice, Greater Poland Voivodeship (north-central Poland)
- Czernice, Choszczno County in West Pomeranian Voivodeship (north-west Poland)
- Czernice, Pyrzyce County in West Pomeranian Voivodeship (north-west Poland)
