= Walkow =

Walkow may refer to the following places in Poland:

- Walków, Łódź Voivodeship (central Poland)
- Wałków, Greater Poland Voivodeship (west-central Poland)
