= Borki Walkowskie =

- Village
- Location within Poland
- Coordinates: 51°19′11″N 18°45′30″E
- Country: Poland
- Voivodeship: Łódź
- County: Wieluń
- Gmina: Osjaków

Borki Walkowskie [ˈbɔrki valˈkɔfskʲɛ] is a village in the administrative district of Gmina Osjaków, within Wieluń County, Łódź Voivodeship, in central Poland.
