= Złota Góra, Łódź Voivodeship =

Złota Góra
- Settlement
- Location within Poland
- Coordinates: 51°09′36″N 18°26′10″E
- Country: Poland
- Voivodeship: Łódź
- County: Wieluń
- Gmina: Skomlin

Złota Góra [ˈzwɔta ˈɡura] is a settlement in the administrative district of Gmina Skomlin, within Wieluń County, Łódź Voivodeship, in central Poland.
