= Staw =

Staw may refer to the following places:

- Staw, Brodnica County in Kuyavian-Pomeranian Voivodeship (north-central Poland)
- Staw, Chełmno County in Kuyavian-Pomeranian Voivodeship (north-central Poland)
- Staw, Lublin Voivodeship (east Poland)
- Staw, Łódź Voivodeship (central Poland)
- Staw, Masovian Voivodeship (east-central Poland)
- Staw, Kalisz County in Greater Poland Voivodeship (west-central Poland)
- Staw, Słupca County in Greater Poland Voivodeship (west-central Poland)
- Staw, Lubusz Voivodeship (west Poland)
