= Głuchów, Wieluń County =

Głuchów
- Village
- Location within Poland
- Coordinates: 51°20′56″N 18°51′25″E
- Country: Poland
- Voivodeship: Łódź
- County: Wieluń
- Gmina: Konopnica
- Population: 120

Głuchów [ˈɡwuxuf] is a village in the administrative district of Gmina Konopnica, within Wieluń County, Łódź Voivodeship, in central Poland.
