= Milejów =

Milejów may refer to the following places:

- Milejów, Piotrków County in Łódź Voivodeship (central Poland)
- Milejów, Wieluń County in Łódź Voivodeship (central Poland)
- Milejów, Lublin Voivodeship (east Poland)
- Milejów, Greater Poland Voivodeship (central Poland)
