= Troniny, Łódź Voivodeship =

Troniny
- Village
- Location within Poland
- Coordinates: 51°5′48″N 18°44′26″E
- Country: Poland
- Voivodeship: Łódź
- County: Wieluń
- Gmina: Pątnów
- Population: 70

Troniny [trɔˈninɨ] is a village in the administrative district of Gmina Pątnów, within Wieluń County, Łódź Voivodeship, in central Poland.
