= Raczyn, Łódź Voivodeship =

Raczyn
- Village
- Location within Poland
- Coordinates: 51°15′29″N 18°32′4″E
- Country: Poland
- Voivodeship: Łódź
- County: Wieluń
- Gmina: Czarnożyły

Raczyn [ˈrat͡ʂɨn] is a village in the administrative district of Gmina Czarnożyły, within Wieluń County, Łódź Voivodeship, in central Poland.
