= Gligi =

- Village
- Location within Poland
- Coordinates: 51°5′24″N 18°45′49″E
- Country: Poland
- Voivodeship: Łódź
- County: Wieluń
- Gmina: Pątnów
- Population: 90

Gligi [ˈɡliɡi] is a village in the administrative district of Gmina Pątnów, within Wieluń County, Łódź Voivodeship, in central Poland.
