= Józefów, Wieluń County =

Józefów
- Village
- Location within Poland
- Coordinates: 51°8′31″N 18°33′17″E
- Country: Poland
- Voivodeship: Łódź
- County: Wieluń
- Gmina: Pątnów

Józefów (Polish pronunciation: [juˈzɛfuf]) is a village in the administrative district of Gmina Pątnów, within Wieluń County, Łódź Voivodeship, in central Poland.
