= Jasień, Wieluń County =

Jasień
- Village
- Location within Poland
- Coordinates: 51°17′18″N 18°43′44″E
- Country: Poland
- Voivodeship: Łódź
- County: Wieluń
- Gmina: Osjaków

Jasień [ˈjaɕɛɲ] is a village in the administrative district of Gmina Osjaków, within Wieluń County, Łódź Voivodeship, in central Poland.
