= Kuźnica Ługowska =

- Village
- Location within Poland
- Coordinates: 51°16′43″N 18°50′0″E
- Country: Poland
- Voivodeship: Łódź
- County: Wieluń
- Gmina: Osjaków

Kuźnica Ługowska (Polish pronunciation: [kuʑˈɲit͡sa wuˈɡɔfska]) is a village in the administrative district of Gmina Osjaków, within Wieluń County, Łódź Voivodeship, in central Poland.
