= Maręże =

- Village
- Location within Poland
- Coordinates: 51°12′12″N 18°23′53″E
- Country: Poland
- Voivodeship: Łódź
- County: Wieluń
- Gmina: Skomlin

Maręże [maˈrɛ̃ʐɛ] is a village in the administrative district of Gmina Skomlin, within Wieluń County, Łódź Voivodeship, in central Poland.
