= Gmina Konopnica =

Gmina Konopnica may refer to either of the following rural administrative districts in Poland:

- Gmina Konopnica, Lublin Voivodeship
- Gmina Konopnica, Łódź Voivodeship
