= Dębina, Wieluń County =

Dębina
- Village
- Location within Poland
- Coordinates: 51°17′45″N 18°46′37″E
- Country: Poland
- Voivodeship: Łódź
- County: Wieluń
- Gmina: Osjaków

Dębina [dɛmˈbina] is a village in the administrative district of Gmina Osjaków, within Wieluń County, Łódź Voivodeship, in central Poland.
