= Gwizdałki =

- Village
- Location within Poland
- Coordinates: 51°19′23″N 18°36′12″E
- Country: Poland
- Voivodeship: Łódź
- County: Wieluń
- Gmina: Ostrówek

Gwizdałki [ɡvizˈdau̯ki] is a village in the administrative district of Gmina Ostrówek, within Wieluń County, Łódź Voivodeship, in central Poland.
