= Motyl =

Motyl may refer to:

- Poznań Aviation Circle Motyl, a Polish sailplane

== Places ==
- Motyl, Kuyavian-Pomeranian Voivodeship, a village in Poland
- Motyl, Łódź Voivodeship, a village in Poland

== People ==
- Alexander J. Motyl (born 1953), American historian
- Vladimir Motyl (1927–2010), Belarusian film director
