= Wygoda, Wieluń County =

Wygoda
- Settlement
- Location within Poland
- Coordinates: 51°17′N 18°28′E
- Country: Poland
- Voivodeship: Łódź
- County: Wieluń
- Gmina: Skomlin

Wygoda [vɨˈɡɔda] is a settlement in the administrative district of Gmina Skomlin, within Wieluń County, Łódź Voivodeship, in central Poland.
