= Gromadzice, Łódź Voivodeship =

Gromadzice
- Village
- Location within Poland
- Coordinates: 51°17′24″N 18°37′8″E
- Country: Poland
- Voivodeship: Łódź
- County: Wieluń
- Gmina: Czarnożyły
- Population: 380

Gromadzice [ɡrɔmaˈd͡ʑit͡sɛ] is a village in the administrative district of Gmina Czarnożyły, within Wieluń County, Łódź Voivodeship, in central Poland.
