= Zmyślona, Wieluń County =

Zmyślona
- Village
- Location within Poland
- Coordinates: 51°9′28″N 18°29′5″E
- Country: Poland
- Voivodeship: Łódź
- County: Wieluń
- Gmina: Mokrsko

Zmyślona [zmɨˈɕlɔna] is a village in the administrative district of Gmina Mokrsko, within Wieluń County, Łódź Voivodeship, in central Poland.
