= Bojanów =

Bojanów may refer to:

- Bojanów, Łódź Voivodeship (central Poland)
- Bojanów, Silesian Voivodeship (south Poland)
- Bojanów, Subcarpathian Voivodeship (south-east Poland)
