= Krzyworzeka, Łódź Voivodeship =

Krzyworzeka
- Village
- Location within Poland
- Coordinates: 51°11′2″N 18°30′59″E
- Country: Poland
- Voivodeship: Łódź
- County: Wieluń
- Gmina: Mokrsko

Krzyworzeka [kʂɨvɔˈʐɛka] is a village in the administrative district of Gmina Mokrsko, within Wieluń County, Łódź Voivodeship, in central Poland.
