= Mątewki =

- Village
- Location within Poland
- Coordinates: 51°12′10″N 18°27′14″E
- Country: Poland
- Voivodeship: Łódź
- County: Wieluń
- Gmina: Mokrsko

Mątewki [mɔnˈtɛfki] is a village in the administrative district of Gmina Mokrsko, within Wieluń County, Łódź Voivodeship, in central Poland.
