= Ożarów, Łódź Voivodeship =

Ożarów
- Village
- Location within Poland
- Coordinates: 51°9′0″N 18°31′0″E
- Country: Poland
- Voivodeship: Łódź
- County: Wieluń
- Gmina: Mokrsko
- Elevation: 240 m (790 ft)

Ożarów [ɔˈʐaruf] is a village in the administrative district of Gmina Mokrsko, within Wieluń County, Łódź Voivodeship, in central Poland.
