= Zadole Park =

Park in Katowice, Poland

Coordinates: 50°13′02″N 18°57′44″E

- Interactive map of Zadole Park
- Type: Public park
- Location: Zadole, Katowice, Metropolis GZM, Poland

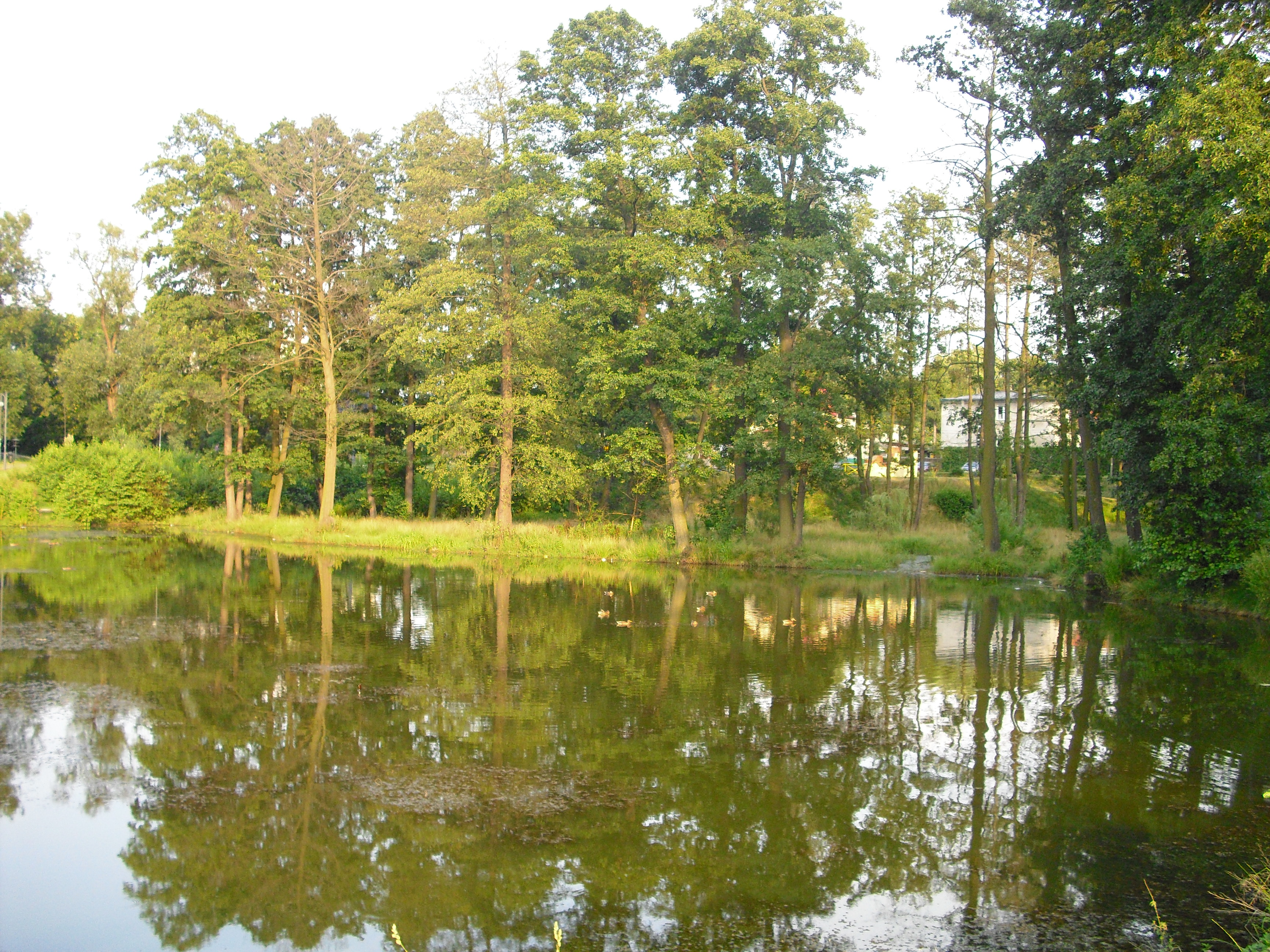

The Zadole Park is a park in Zadole, a part of the city of Katowice in Metropolis GZM. The park features an amphitheater for 800 persons, a swimming-pool complex, a cafe and a playground for children and walking alleys. In 1906–1914 it was a place of the convention of the Polish choirs and bands within the framework of the Singing Societies existing in that region at that time. Students Hostels adjoin the center and not far from them there are tennis courts – free of charge.
