= Oleśnica, Wieluń County =

Oleśnica
- Village
- Location within Poland
- Coordinates: 51°22′29″N 18°36′42″E
- Country: Poland
- Voivodeship: Łódź
- County: Wieluń
- Gmina: Ostrówek
- Population: 80

Oleśnica (Polish pronunciation: [ɔlɛˈɕɲit͡sa]) is a village in the administrative district of Gmina Ostrówek, within Wieluń County, Łódź Voivodeship, in central Poland.
