= Kluski (disambiguation) =

Kluski (singular kluska or klusek) is a Polish name for various kinds of noodles and dumplings.

Kluski may also refer to:

- Kluski, Wieluń County in Łódź Voivodeship (central Poland)
- Kluski, Wieruszów County in Łódź Voivodeship (central Poland)

The singular form is also a surname:

- Roman Kluska, Polish businessman, founder of the company Optimus S.A.
- Jennifer Kluska, American film director
