= Grębień =

- Village
- Location within Poland
- Coordinates: 51°8′N 18°35′E
- Country: Poland
- Voivodeship: Łódź
- County: Wieluń
- Gmina: Pątnów

Grębień [ˈɡrɛmbjɛɲ] is a village in the administrative district of Gmina Pątnów, within Wieluń County, Łódź Voivodeship, in central Poland.
