= Nietuszyna =

- Village
- Location within Poland
- Coordinates: 51°19′11″N 18°35′2″E
- Country: Poland
- Voivodeship: Łódź
- County: Wieluń
- Gmina: Ostrówek
- Population: 490
- Website: nietuszyna.republika.pl

Nietuszyna [ɲɛtuˈʂɨna] is a village in the administrative district of Gmina Ostrówek, within Wieluń County, Łódź Voivodeship, in central Poland.
