= Opojowice =

- Village
- Location within Poland
- Coordinates: 51°16′N 18°35′E
- Country: Poland
- Voivodeship: Łódź
- County: Wieluń
- Gmina: Czarnożyły

Opojowice [ɔpɔjɔˈvit͡sɛ] is a village in the administrative district of Gmina Czarnożyły, within Wieluń County, Łódź Voivodeship, in central Poland.
