= Załęcze Wielkie =

- Village
- Location within Poland
- Coordinates: 51°5′N 18°41′E
- Country: Poland
- Voivodeship: Łódź
- County: Wieluń
- Gmina: Pątnów

Załęcze Wielkie [zaˈwɛnt͡ʂɛ ˈvjɛlkʲɛ] is a village in the administrative district of Gmina Pątnów, within Wieluń County, Łódź Voivodeship, in central Poland.

Jurassic (Oxfordian) outcrops in abandoned quarries located near the village yielded fossils of a thalattosuchian crocodylomorph belonging to the superfamily Teleosauroidea.
