= Kopiec, Wieluń County =

Kopiec
- Settlement
- Location within Poland
- Coordinates: 51°19′48″N 18°41′27″E
- Country: Poland
- Voivodeship: Łódź
- County: Wieluń
- Gmina: Ostrówek

Kopiec [ˈkɔpjɛt͡s] is a settlement in the administrative district of Gmina Ostrówek, within Wieluń County, Łódź Voivodeship, in central Poland.
