= Bębnów, Łódź Voivodeship =

Bębnów
- Village
- Location within Poland
- Coordinates: 51°19′23″N 18°46′53″E
- Country: Poland
- Voivodeship: Łódź
- County: Wieluń
- Gmina: Konopnica

Bębnów [ˈbɛmbnuf] is a village in the administrative district of Gmina Konopnica, within Wieluń County, Łódź Voivodeship, in central Poland.
