= Dzietrzniki =

- Village
- Location within Poland
- Coordinates: 51°6′51″N 18°36′59″E
- Country: Poland
- Voivodeship: Łódź
- County: Wieluń
- Gmina: Pątnów
- Population: 1,064

Dzietrzniki [d͡ʑɛtʂˈniki] is a village in the administrative district of Gmina Pątnów, within Wieluń County, Łódź Voivodeship, in central Poland.
