= Huta Czernicka =

- Village
- Location within Poland
- Coordinates: 51°18′10″N 18°42′13″E
- Country: Poland
- Voivodeship: Łódź
- County: Wieluń
- Municipality: Osjaków
- Population (2021): 13
- Time zone: UTC+1 (CET)
  - Summer (DST): UTC+2 (CEST)
- Postal code: 98-320
- Area code: +48 43
- Car plates: EWI

Huta Czernicka (Polish: [ˈxu.ta ˈt͡ʂɛr.ɲit͡s.ka]) is a village in Łódź Voivodeship, Poland, in the Wieluń County, within the municipality of Osjaków. In 2021, it had 13 inhabitants.
