= Kazimierz, Gmina Skomlin =

Kazimierz
- Settlement
- Country: Poland
- Voivodeship: Łódź
- County: Wieluń
- Gmina: Skomlin

Kazimierz (Polish pronunciation: [kaˈʑimjɛʂ]) is a settlement in the administrative district of Gmina Skomlin, within Wieluń County, Łódź Voivodeship, in central Poland.
