= Platoń =

- Village
- Location within Poland
- Coordinates: 51°17′25″N 18°29′14″E
- Country: Poland
- Voivodeship: Łódź
- County: Wieluń
- Gmina: Czarnożyły

Platoń [ˈplatɔɲ] is a village in the administrative district of Gmina Czarnożyły, within Wieluń County, Łódź Voivodeship, in central Poland.
