= Piskornik =

- Settlement
- Location within Poland
- Coordinates: 51°17′17″N 18°40′38″E
- Country: Poland
- Voivodeship: Łódź
- County: Wieluń
- Gmina: Ostrówek

Piskornik [pisˈkɔrnik] is a settlement in the administrative district of Gmina Ostrówek, within Wieluń County, Łódź Voivodeship, in central Poland.
