= Wichernik =

- Village
- Location within Poland
- Coordinates: 51°11′N 18°25′E
- Country: Poland
- Voivodeship: Łódź
- County: Wieluń
- Gmina: Skomlin

Wichernik [viˈxɛrnik] is a village in the administrative district of Gmina Skomlin, within Wieluń County, Łódź Voivodeship, in central Poland.
