= Wielgie =

Wielgie may refer to the following places:

- Wielgie, Golub-Dobrzyń County in Kuyavian-Pomeranian Voivodeship (north-central Poland)
- Wielgie, Lipno County in Kuyavian-Pomeranian Voivodeship (north-central Poland)
- Wielgie, Łódź Voivodeship (central Poland)
- Wielgie, Masovian Voivodeship (east-central Poland)
