= Łagiewniki, Wieluń County =

Łagiewniki
- Village
- Location within Poland
- Coordinates: 51°16′N 18°30′E
- Country: Poland
- Voivodeship: Łódź
- County: Wieluń
- Gmina: Czarnożyły

Łagiewniki [waɡʲɛvˈniki] is a village in the administrative district of Gmina Czarnożyły, within Wieluń County, Łódź Voivodeship, in central Poland.
