= Lipie, Wieluń County =

Lipie
- Village
- Location within Poland
- Coordinates: 51°8′N 18°27′E
- Country: Poland
- Voivodeship: Łódź
- County: Wieluń
- Gmina: Mokrsko

Lipie [ˈlipjɛ] is a village in the administrative district of Gmina Mokrsko, within Wieluń County, Łódź Voivodeship, in central Poland.
