= Józefina, Wieluń County =

Józefina
- Village
- Location within Poland
- Coordinates: 51°16′24″N 18°43′24″E
- Country: Poland
- Voivodeship: Łódź
- County: Wieluń
- Gmina: Osjaków

Józefina [juzɛˈfina] is a village in the administrative district of Gmina Osjaków, within Wieluń County, Łódź Voivodeship, in central Poland.
