= Rychłocice =

- Village
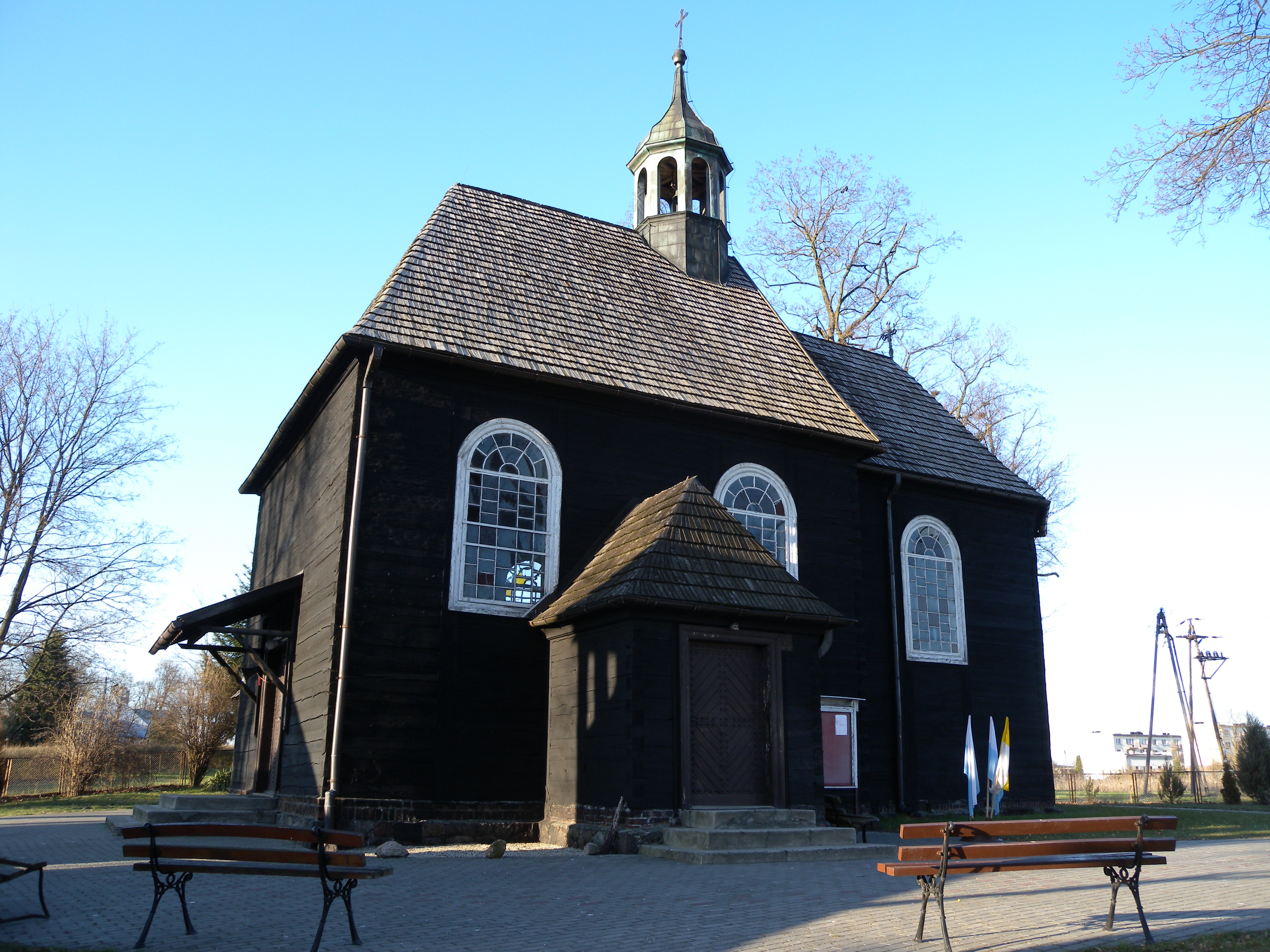
- Church of the Annunciation of the Virgin Mary

- Location within Poland
- Coordinates: 51°23′N 18°49′E
- Country: Poland
- Voivodeship: Łódź
- County: Wieluń
- Gmina: Konopnica

Population
  - Total: 780
- Time zone: UTC+1 (CET)
  - Summer (DST): UTC+2 (CEST)
- Vehicle registration: EWI

Rychłocice [rɨxwɔˈt͡ɕit͡sɛ] is a village in the administrative district of Gmina Konopnica, within Wieluń County, Łódź Voivodeship, in central Poland.

== History ==
During the German invasion of Poland at the start of World War II, on 3 September 1939, it was the location of fierce fighting between Polish and German troops, and the bridge over the Warta River was bombed by the Luftwaffe. Afterwards the village was occupied by Germany until 1945. Eight troops of the Polish 72nd Infantry Regiment are buried at a local cemetery.
