= Mokrsko =

- Village
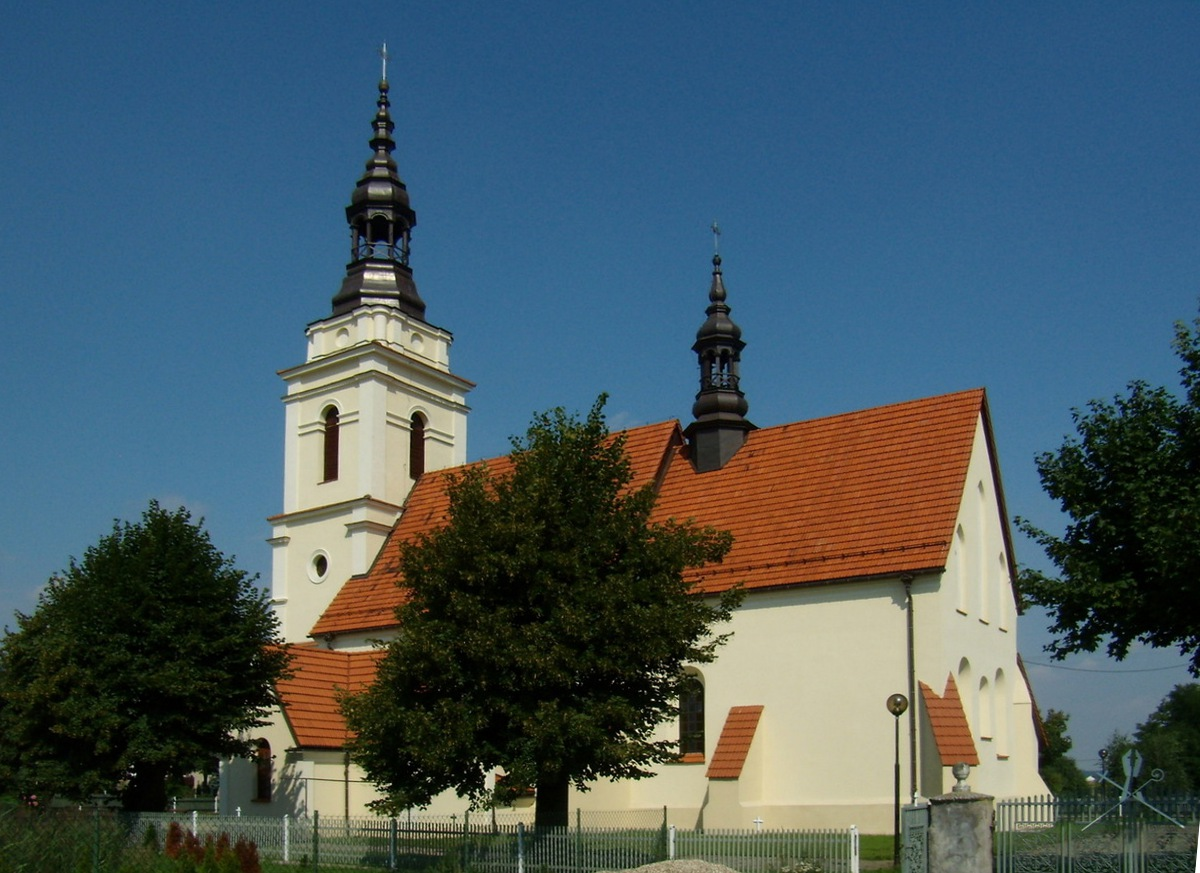
- Saint Stanislaus church in Mokrsko

- Location within Poland
- Coordinates: 51°10′29″N 18°27′46″E
- Country: Poland
- Voivodeship: Łódź
- County: Wieluń
- Gmina: Mokrsko
- Population: 1,500
- Time zone: UTC+1 (CET)
  - Summer (DST): UTC+2 (CEST)
- Vehicle registration: EWI

Mokrsko [ˈmɔkrskɔ] is a village in Wieluń County, Łódź Voivodeship, in south-central Poland. It is the seat of the gmina (administrative district) called Gmina Mokrsko.

== History ==
The territory became a part of the emerging Polish state under its first historic ruler Mieszko I in the 10th century. Mokrsko was the ancestral seat of the Kożuchowski noble family of Sokola coat of arms, who lived there since the 14th century. Before 1500, the family founded the local Catholic parish and church. The village was administratively located in the Ostrzeszów County in the Sieradz Voivodeship in the Greater Poland Province.

In 1827, Mokrsko had a population of 797.

During the German occupation of Poland (World War II), in 1940, the German gendarmerie carried out expulsions of Poles, who were either enslaved as forced labour in the region or deported to the General Government in the more eastern part of German-occupied Poland. Houses and farms of expelled Poles were handed over to German colonists as part of the Lebensraum policy.

== Administrative division ==
Several adjacent settlements are considered part of Mokrsko: Korea, Kośnik, Majorat, Mokrsko Rządowe, Poduchowne, Wiatraki, Wola Mokrska, Zimna Woda.
