= Wola Rudlicka =

- Village
- Location within Poland
- Coordinates: 51°22′N 18°37′E
- Country: Poland
- Voivodeship: Łódź
- County: Wieluń
- Gmina: Ostrówek

Wola Rudlicka [ˈvɔla rudˈlit͡ska] is a village in the administrative district of Gmina Ostrówek, within Wieluń County, Łódź Voivodeship, in central Poland.
