= Kamionka, Wieluń County =

Kamionka
- Village
- Location within Poland
- Coordinates: 51°10′8″N 18°36′17″E
- Country: Poland
- Voivodeship: Łódź
- County: Wieluń
- Gmina: Pątnów

Kamionka ([kaˈmjɔnka]; German: Kamionka, 1943–45 Steindorf) is a village in the administrative district of Gmina Pątnów, within Wieluń County, Łódź Voivodeship, in central Poland.
