= Kamyk, Łódź Voivodeship =

Kamyk
- Village
- Location within Poland
- Coordinates: 51°21′50″N 18°52′37″E
- Country: Poland
- Voivodeship: Łódź
- County: Wieluń
- Gmina: Konopnica

Kamyk [ˈkamɨk] is a village in the administrative district of Gmina Konopnica, within Wieluń County, Łódź Voivodeship, in central Poland.
