= Madeły =

- Settlement
- Location within Poland
- Coordinates: 51°06′41″N 18°39′54″E
- Country: Poland
- Voivodeship: Łódź
- County: Wieluń
- Gmina: Pątnów

Madeły [maˈdɛwɨ] is a settlement in the administrative district of Gmina Pątnów, within Wieluń County, Łódź Voivodeship, in central Poland.
