= Staw, Łódź Voivodeship =

Staw
- Village
- Location within Poland
- Coordinates: 51°15′16″N 18°36′29″E
- Country: Poland
- Voivodeship: Łódź
- County: Wieluń
- Gmina: Czarnożyły
- Population: 320

Staw [staf] is a village in the administrative district of Gmina Czarnożyły, within Wieluń County, Łódź Voivodeship, in central Poland.
