= Malinówka, Łódź Voivodeship =

Malinówka
- Settlement
- Location within Poland
- Coordinates: 51°9′24″N 18°24′42″E
- Country: Poland
- Voivodeship: Łódź
- County: Wieluń
- Gmina: Skomlin

Malinówka [maliˈnufka] is a settlement in the administrative district of Gmina Skomlin, within Wieluń County, Łódź Voivodeship, in central Poland.
