= Gmina Pątnów =

Gmina Pątnów Pątnów Commune
- Gmina
- Coat of arms
- Interactive map of Gmina Pątnów
- Coordinates (Pątnów): 51°8′53″N 18°37′9″E
- Country: Poland
- Voivodeship: Łódź
- County: Wieluń
- Seat: Pątnów

Area
  - Total: 114.3 km^{2} (44.1 sq mi)

Population (2006)
  - Total: 6,452
  - Density: 56.45/km^{2} (146.2/sq mi)
- Website: http://www.ugpatnow.finn.pl/

Gmina Pątnów is a rural gmina (administrative district) in Wieluń County, Łódź Voivodeship, in central Poland. Its seat is the village of Pątnów, which lies approximately 9 kilometres (6 mi) south of Wieluń and 92 km (57 mi) south-west of the regional capital Łódź.

The gmina covers an area of 114.3 square kilometres (44.1 sq mi), and as of 2006 its total population is 6,452.

== Villages ==
Gmina Pątnów contains the villages and settlements of Bieniec, Budziaki, Bukowce, Cieśle, Dzietrzniki, Gligi, Grabowa, Grębień, Józefów, Kałuże, Kamionka, Kluski, Madeły, Pątnów, Popowice, Troniny, Załęcze Małe and Załęcze Wielkie.

== Neighbouring gminas ==
Gmina Pątnów is bordered by the gminas of Działoszyn, Lipie, Mokrsko, Praszka, Rudniki, Wieluń and Wierzchlas.
