= Motyl, Łódź Voivodeship =

Motyl
- Village
- Location within Poland
- Coordinates: 51°7′26″N 18°27′5″E
- Country: Poland
- Voivodeship: Łódź
- County: Wieluń
- Gmina: Mokrsko

Motyl [ˈmɔtɨl] is a village in the administrative district of Gmina Mokrsko, within Wieluń County, Łódź Voivodeship, in central Poland.
