= Bieniec =

- Village
- Location within Poland
- Coordinates: 51°7′9″N 18°38′57″E
- Country: Poland
- Voivodeship: Łódź
- County: Wieluń
- Gmina: Pątnów

Bieniec [ˈbjɛɲɛt͡s] is a village in the administrative district of Gmina Pątnów, within Wieluń County, Łódź Voivodeship, in central Poland.
