= Gmina Osjaków =

Gmina Osjaków Osjaków Commune
- Gmina
- Coat of arms
- Interactive map of Gmina Osjaków
- Coordinates (Osjaków): 51°17′18″N 18°47′33″E
- Country: Poland
- Voivodeship: Łódź
- County: Wieluń
- Seat: Osjaków

Area
  - Total: 100.74 km^{2} (38.90 sq mi)

Population (2006)
  - Total: 4,780
  - Density: 47.4/km^{2} (123/sq mi)

Gmina Osjaków is a rural gmina (administrative district) in Wieluń County, Łódź Voivodeship, in central Poland. Its seat is the village of Osjaków, which lies approximately 17 kilometres (11 mi) north-east of Wieluń and 73 km (45 mi) south-west of the regional capital Łódź.

The gmina covers an area of 100.74 square kilometres (38.9 sq mi), and as of 2006 its total population is 4,780.

== Villages ==
Gmina Osjaków contains the villages and settlements of Borki Walkowskie, Chorzyna, Czernice, Dębina, Dolina Czernicka, Drobnice, Felinów, Gabrielów, Huta Czernicka, Jasień, Józefina, Kolonia Raducka, Krzętle, Kuźnica Ługowska, Kuźnica Strobińska, Nowa Wieś, Osjaków, Raducki Folwark, Raduczyce, Walków and Zofia.

== Neighbouring gminas ==
Gmina Osjaków is bordered by the gminas of Kiełczygłów, Konopnica, Ostrówek, Rusiec, Siemkowice, Wieluń and Wierzchlas.
