= Osjaków =

- Town
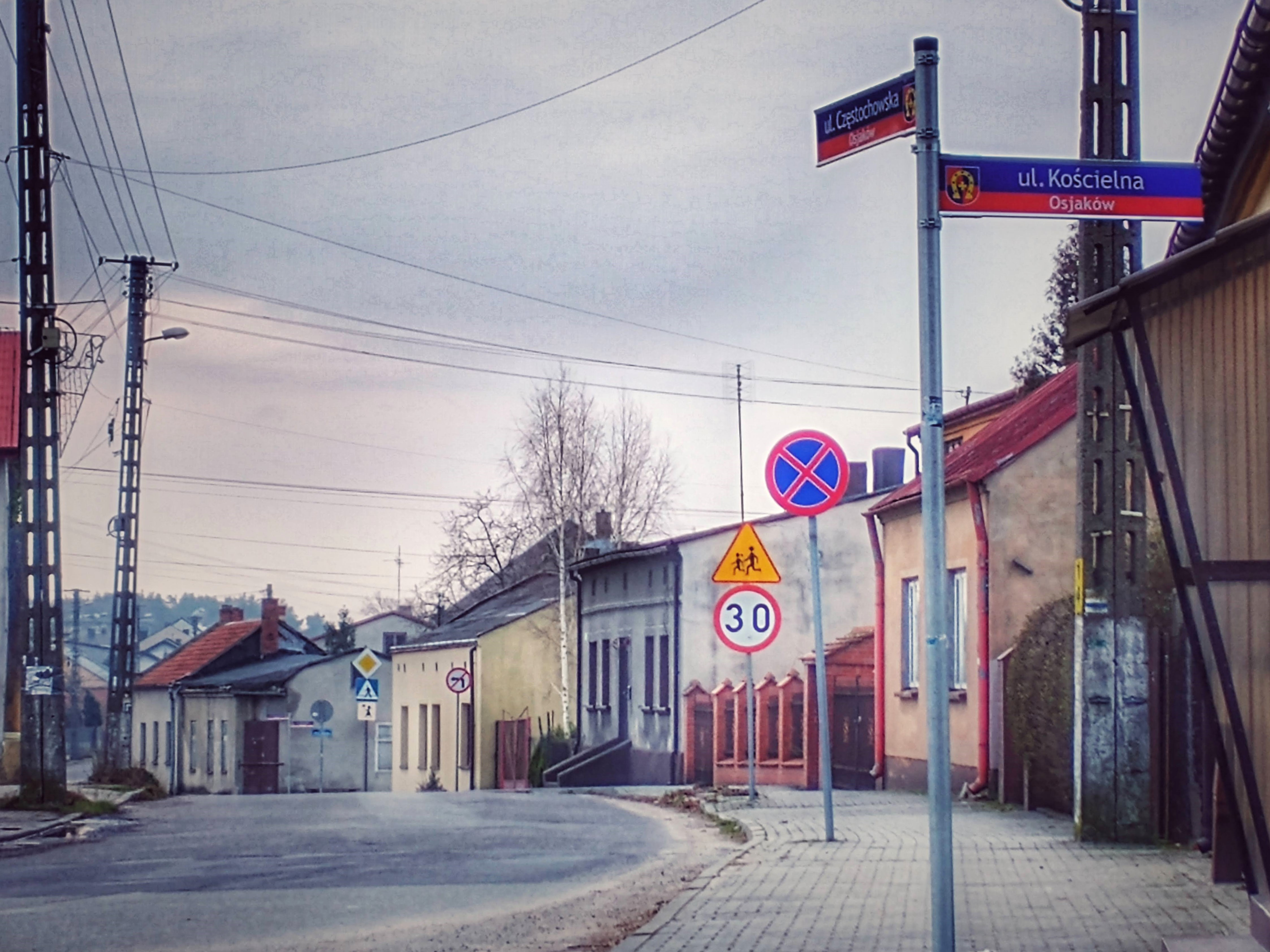
- Częstochowska street Osjakow

- Coat of arms

- Location within Poland
- Coordinates: 51°17′18″N 18°47′33″E
- Country: Poland
- Voivodeship: Łódź
- County: Wieluń
- Gmina: Osjaków

Population
  - Total: 1,221
- Time zone: UTC+1 (CET)
  - Summer (DST): UTC+2 (CEST)
- Vehicle registration: EWI
- Website: https://www.osjakow.pl/

Osjaków [ɔsˈjakuf] is a town in Wieluń County, Łódź Voivodeship, in central Poland. It is the seat of the gmina (administrative district) called Gmina Osjaków. It is located on the Warta River, approximately 17 km (11 mi) north-east of Wieluń and 73 km (45 mi) south-west of the regional capital Łódź.

== Etymology ==
Several legends attempt to explain the origin of the name Osjaków. One of the best known tells of a prince who, while travelling through the area, decided to establish a camp at the site of the present-day town. As his companions began unpacking their juki (saddlebags), a swarm of wasps (osy in Polish) allegedly flew out of the bags. The startled prince is said to have shouted, "Osy z juków lecą!" ("Wasps are flying out of the bags!"). According to the legend, this exclamation gradually evolved into the name Osjaków.

Historians generally consider a different explanation to be more likely. The name is thought to derive from Jan Ostrowski, the Burgrave of Wieluń and owner of Osjaków, from whom the settlement may have taken its name.

Three names are mentioned in the Geographical Dictionary of the Kingdom of Poland from the late 19th century, i.e. Osyaków, Osiaków and Ossyjaków.

== History ==
=== Early history (Middle Ages) ===
The first mentions of Osjaków come from the 15th century, although there is indirect evidence that it had been a town before this time, at least as far back as 1299. It was granted town rights before 1494. The town's ideal location on the Warta river meant it was able to develop rapidly. By 1499, it had three working water mills. It was a private town, administratively located in the Wieluń County in the Sieradz Voivodeship in the Greater Poland Province of the Kingdom of Poland.

The name of the town fluctuated with its grammar during this period, with variants Osschyacow, de Ostrow, and Ossyakow.

=== Late modern period ===
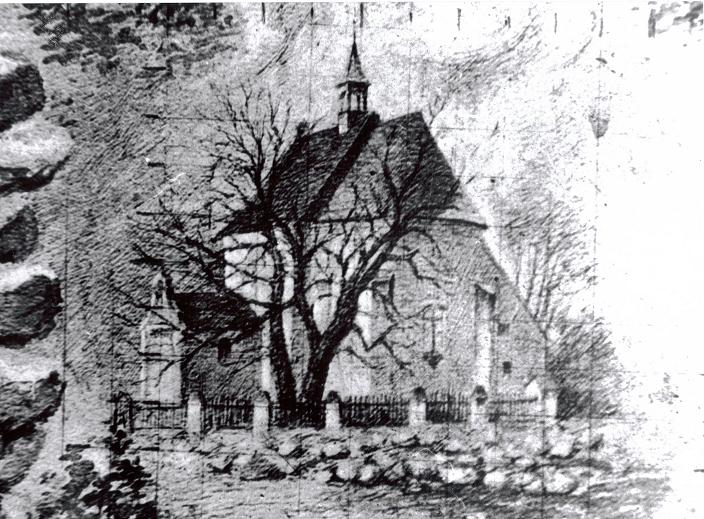
Old church of St Hedwig of Silesia, destroyed to make space for the current church of Sigismund

Osjaków was an average Polish provincial town until the town was ravaged by a fire in 1750, which destroyed much of its wooden infrastructure. As a result, it lost its town rights in 1793. Until today Osjaków retains much of its urban layout, with a central square. During the Second Partition of Poland, Osjaków was annexed by the Kingdom of Prussia. During the conflicts between France and Prussia from 1807 to 1815, Osjaków briefly returned into Polish hands under the Duchy of Warsaw. By 1813 however, it was occupied by the Russian Empire. Throughout this period, the village remained near the border between the Prussian and Russian Empires.

In 1909, the old wooden church of St Hedwig of Silesia was demolished to make place for the current church of Casimir the King. The church is now Osjaków's most recognizable monument.

=== World War II ===
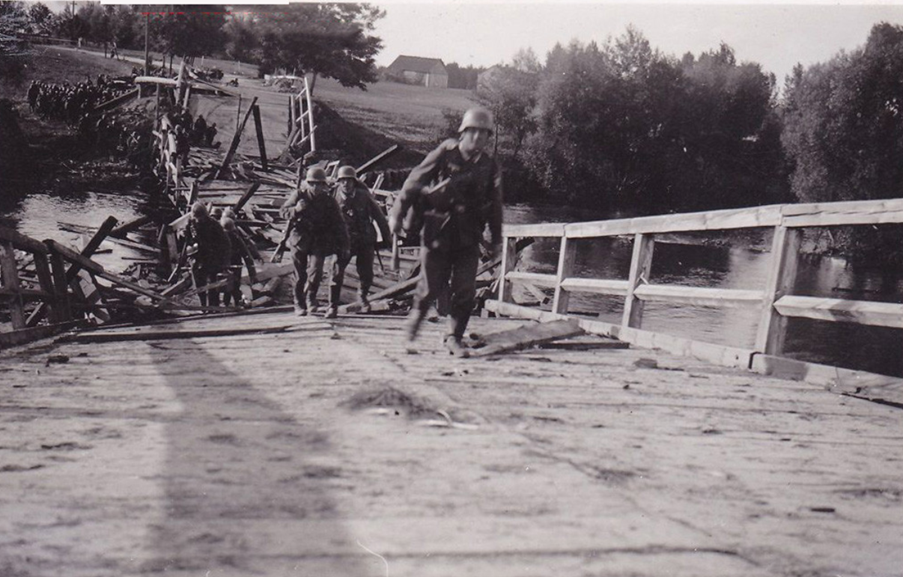
Osjaków's main bridge after initial German invasion of Poland

Osjaków is located next to Wieluń, which in September 1939 was the first town attacked during World War II. In the following days, Osjaków was on the front lines of war and witnessed a mass influx of refugees from Wieluń and other towns, who were fleeing to the east of the Warta river, despite not suffering much damage to infrastructure. By October 8, 1939, Osjaków was annexed into the Third Reich. Its name was Germanised into Ostenwerder. Several Poles, who were either born or lived and worked in Osjaków, were murdered by the Russians in the Katyn massacre in 1940. By 1941, the school and church were closed, with the local priests having been sent to the Dachau concentration camp. The Prebystery was turned into a German gendarmerie base. In late 1944, much of Osjaków's population was rushed to help Nazi Germany in the Volkssturm.

Towards the end of war, on the Eastern Front, regions around Osjaków were the sites of battles, as the Warta river was an important strategic target. It then came under Soviet control, much like the rest of Poland, following the end of the war.

=== Jewish community ===
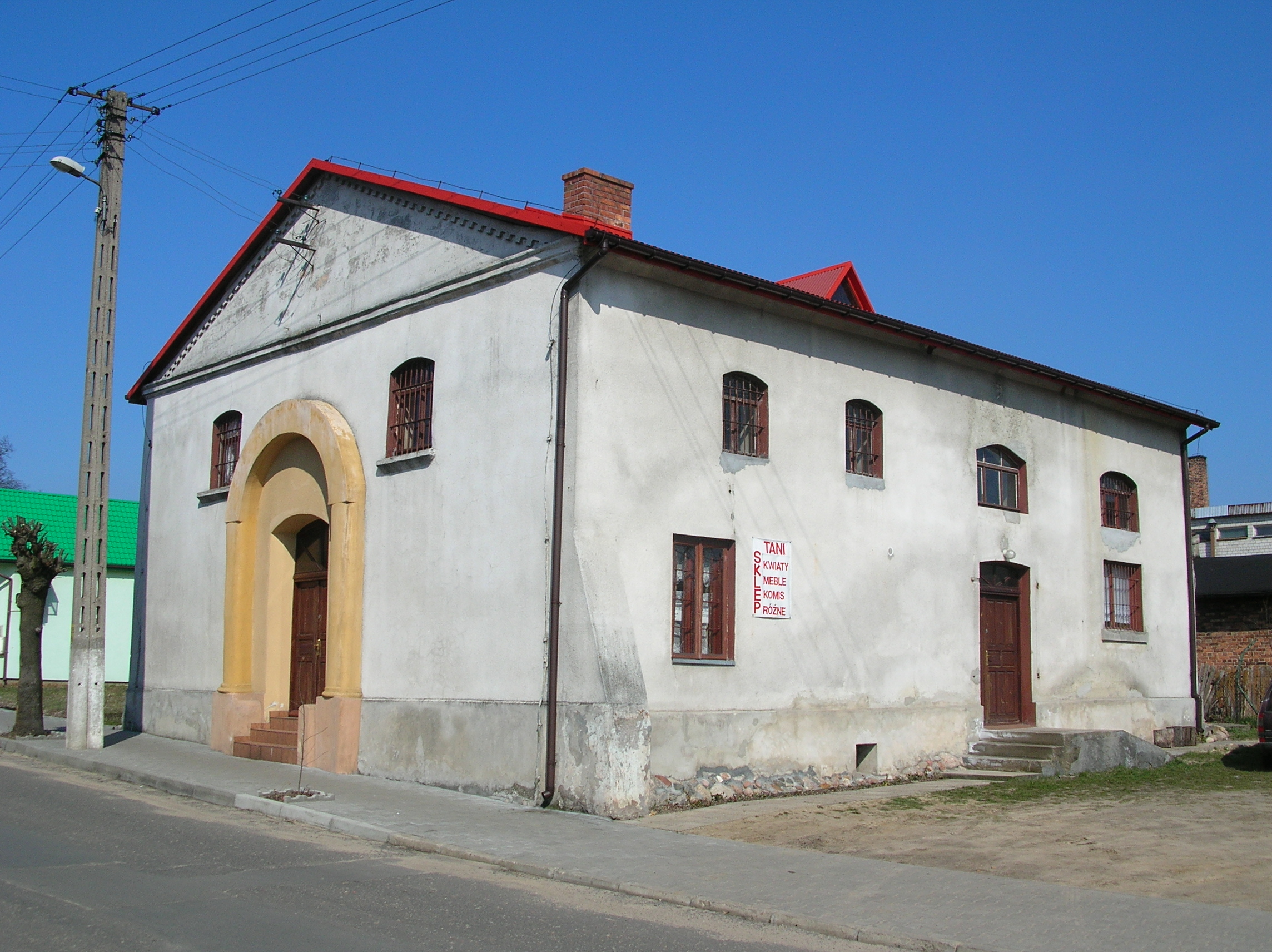
Osjaków synagogue

Jews started settling into Osjaków in the early 18th century. Because the population was mostly working as merchants and traders, Jews mostly lived around the town square, and built the synagogue nearby. The synagogue itself was built in the late 19th century. By 1897, 759 Jews lived in Osjaków, this was 49% of the village's total population.

During World War II, the Nazi German occupation forced the Jews into the Osjaków Ghetto. In 1939, over 60% of Osjaków's population were Jews. In August 1942, the ghetto was liquidated. Most of the Jews were transported to the Łódź Ghetto.

Osjaków's Jewish cemetery was completely destroyed and forgotten after the war. However, the building of the old synagogue which was ravaged from inside still stands. It still retains a Torah ark on the entrance to the building.

== Transport ==
Osjaków lies along national road 74.

The nearest railway station is Rusiec Łódźkie.
