= Konopnica, Wieluń County =

Konopnica
- Village
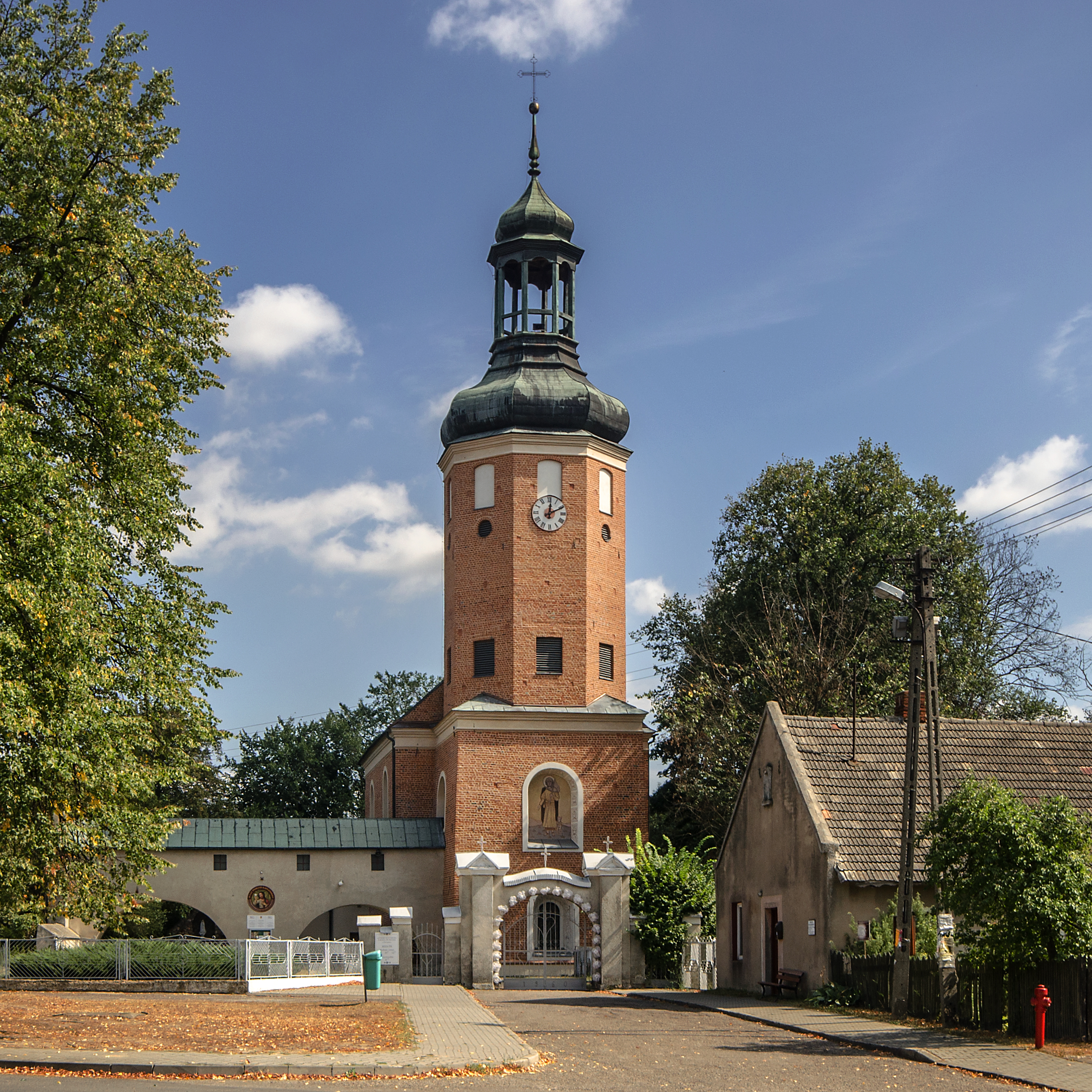
- Church of Saint Roch

- Coat of arms

- Location within Poland
- Coordinates: 51°21′14″N 18°49′24″E
- Country: Poland
- Voivodeship: Łódź
- County: Wieluń
- Gmina: Konopnica

Population
  - Total: 840
- Time zone: UTC+1 (CET)
  - Summer (DST): UTC+2 (CEST)
- Vehicle registration: EWI
- Website: http://www.konopnica.finn.pl

Konopnica [kɔnɔpˈnit͡sa] is a village in Wieluń County, Łódź Voivodeship, in central Poland. It is the seat of the gmina (administrative district) called Gmina Konopnica. It is located on the Warta River.

== History ==
During the German invasion of Poland at the start of World War II, on 3 September 1939, it was the location of fierce fighting between Polish and German infantry. The commander of the 2nd Battalion of the Polish 72nd Infantry Regiment, Major Stanisław Jaszczuk, the commander of the 6th Company, Lieutenant A. Szczepański, and three other officers were killed in the fighting. The Germans entered the village in the evening, but thanks to the fierce Polish defense, some Polish forces managed to retreat. Some Polish soldiers were captured as prisoners of war, whereas the fallen were buried at the local war cemetery. The fallen Germans were taken to Germany. Afterwards the village was occupied by Germany until 1945.
