= Gmina Ostrówek, Łódź Voivodeship =

Gmina Ostrówek Ostrówek Commune
- Gmina
- Coat of arms
- Interactive map of Gmina Ostrówek
- Coordinates (Ostrówek): 51°20′11″N 18°37′5″E
- Country: Poland
- Voivodeship: Łódź
- County: Wieluń
- Seat: Ostrówek

Area
  - Total: 101.6 km^{2} (39.2 sq mi)

Population (2006)
  - Total: 4,642
  - Density: 45.69/km^{2} (118.3/sq mi)

Gmina Ostrówek is a rural gmina (administrative district) in Wieluń County, Łódź Voivodeship, in central Poland. Its seat is the village of Ostrówek, which lies approximately 14 kilometres (9 mi) north of Wieluń and 77 km (48 mi) south-west of the regional capital Łódź.

The gmina covers an area of 101.6 square kilometres (39.2 sq mi), and as of 2006 its total population is 4,642.

== Villages ==
Gmina Ostrówek contains the villages and settlements of Bolków, Dymek, Gwizdałki, Jackowskie, Janów, Kopiec, Kuźnica, Milejów, Niemierzyn, Nietuszyna, Okalew, Oleśnica, Ostrówek, Piskornik, Rudlice, Skrzynno, Wielgie and Wola Rudlicka.

== Neighbouring gminas ==
Gmina Ostrówek is bordered by the gminas of Czarnożyły, Konopnica, Lututów, Osjaków, Wieluń and Złoczew.
