= Skomlin =

- Village
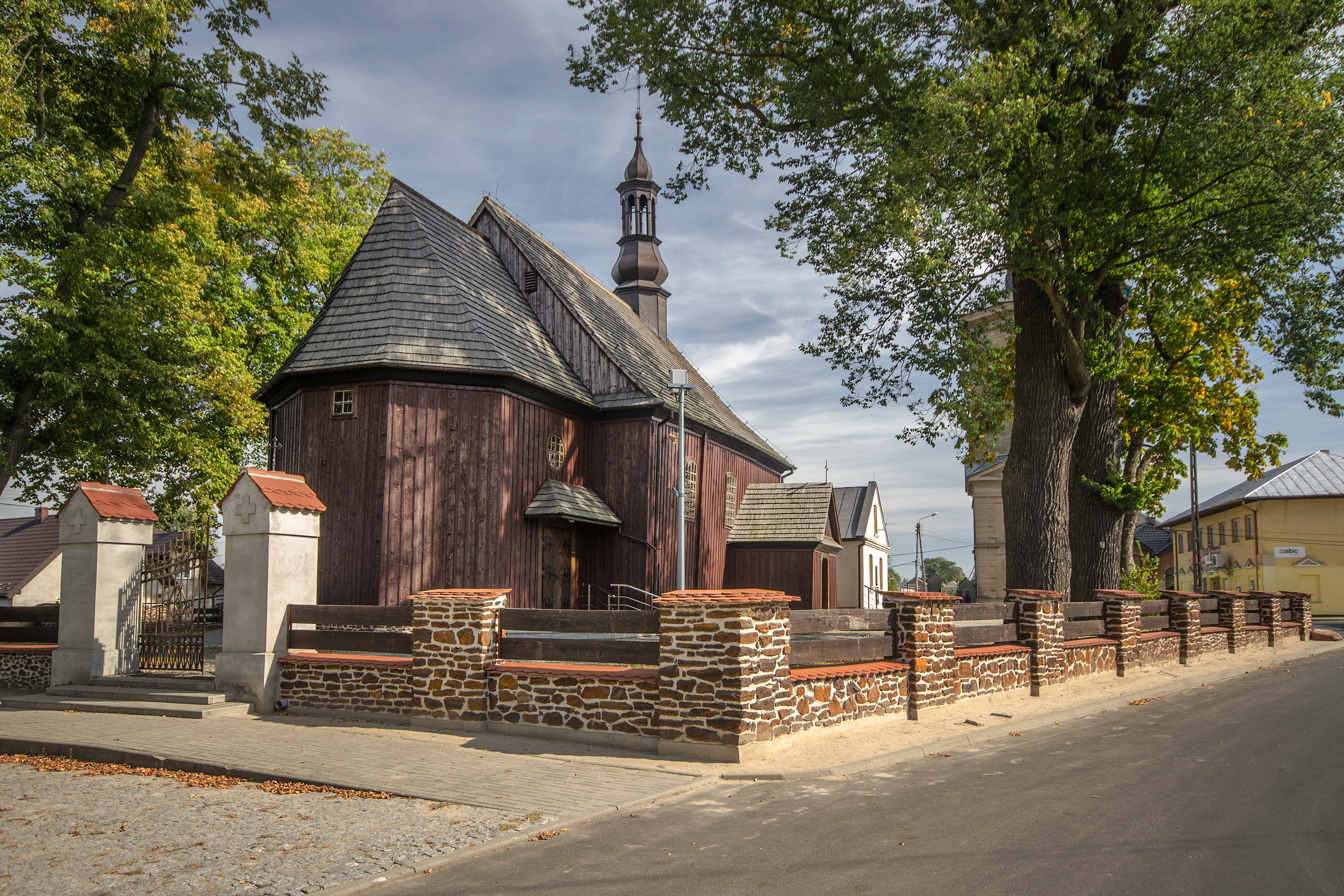
- Church of Saints Philip and James

- Location within Poland
- Coordinates: 51°10′16″N 18°23′16″E
- Country: Poland
- Voivodeship: Łódź
- County: Wieluń
- Gmina: Skomlin
- Population: 1,656
- Time zone: UTC+1 (CET)
  - Summer (DST): UTC+2 (CEST)
- Vehicle registration: EWI

Skomlin [ˈskɔmlin] is a village in Wieluń County, Łódź Voivodeship, in south-central Poland. It is the seat of the gmina (administrative district) called Gmina Skomlin.

== History ==
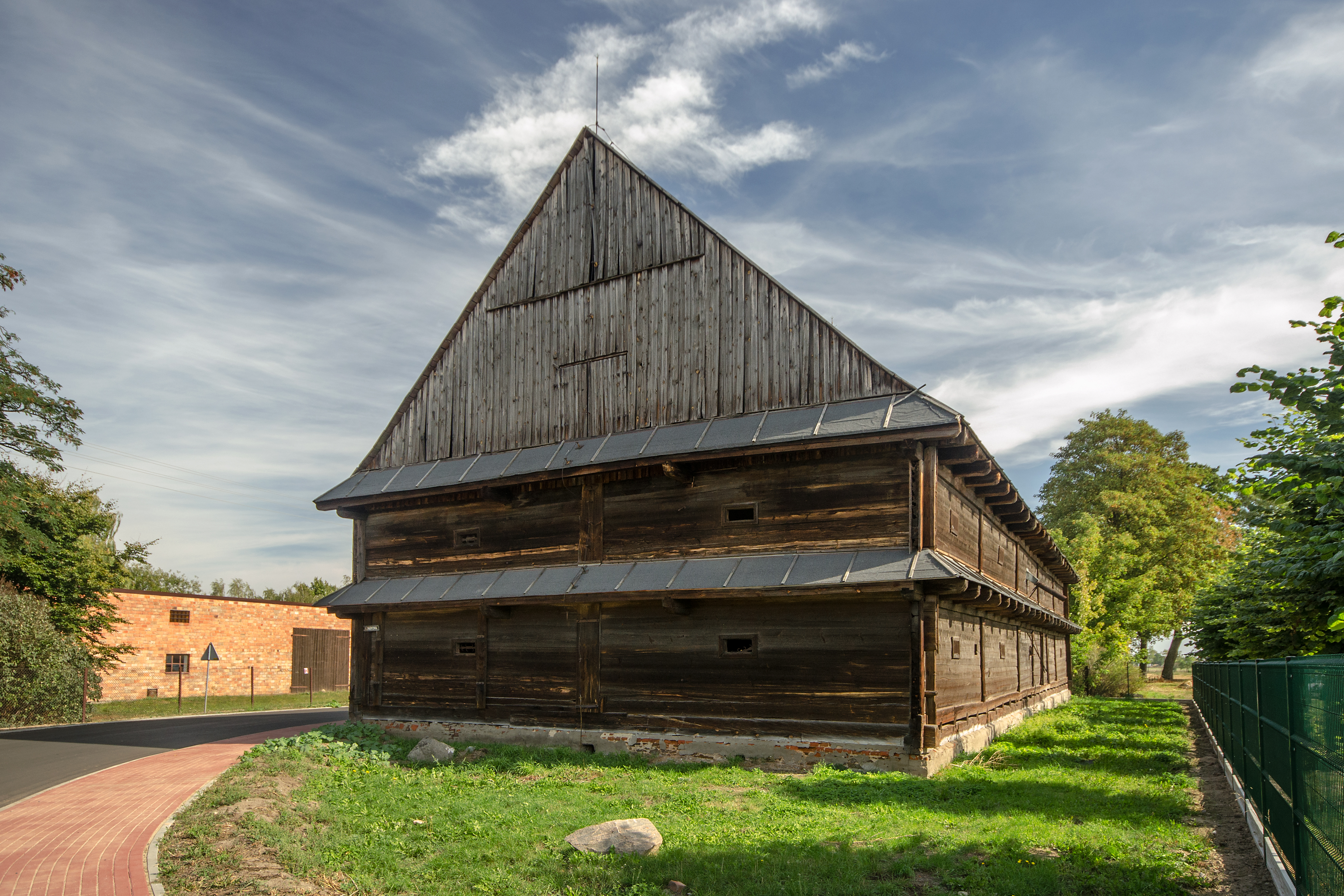
Preserved old granary

The territory became a part of the emerging Polish in the 10th century. In 1210 Skomlin was granted to Cistercian monks, and in 1245 it passed to the Cistercian nuns from Łubnice.

In 1827, it had a population of 867.

During the German occupation of Poland (World War II), in 1940, the German gendarmerie carried out expulsions of Poles, who were placed in a transit camp in Łódź, and then young Poles were deported to forced labour in Germany and German-occupied France, and others were deported to the General Government in the more eastern part of German-occupied Poland. Houses and farms of expelled Poles were handed over to German colonists as part of the Lebensraum policy.
