= Stawek, Łódź Voivodeship =

Stawek
- Village
- Location within Poland
- Coordinates: 51°16′37″N 18°37′22″E
- Country: Poland
- Voivodeship: Łódź
- County: Wieluń
- Gmina: Czarnożyły

Stawek [ˈstavɛk] is a village in the administrative district of Gmina Czarnożyły, within Wieluń County, Łódź Voivodeship, in central Poland.
