= Czarnożyły =

- Village
- Location within Poland
- Coordinates: 51°16′53″N 18°33′48″E
- Country: Poland
- Voivodeship: Łódź
- County: Wieluń
- Gmina: Czarnożyły
- Population (approx.): 1,300

Czarnożyły [t͡ʂarnɔˈʐɨwɨ] is a village in Wieluń County, Łódź Voivodeship, in central Poland. It is the seat of the gmina (administrative district) called Gmina Czarnożyły.

The village has an approximate population of 1,300.
