= Wielgie, Łódź Voivodeship =

Wielgie
- Village
- Location within Poland
- Coordinates: 51°20′11″N 18°42′47″E
- Country: Poland
- Voivodeship: Łódź
- County: Wieluń
- Gmina: Ostrówek

Wielgie [ˈvjɛlɡʲɛ] is a village in the administrative district of Gmina Ostrówek, within Wieluń County, Łódź Voivodeship, in central Poland.
