= Czernice, Łódź Voivodeship =

Czernice
- Village
- Location within Poland
- Coordinates: 51°18′3″N 18°44′43″E
- Country: Poland
- Voivodeship: Łódź
- County: Wieluń
- Gmina: Osjaków

Czernice [t͡ʂɛrˈnit͡sɛ] is a village in the administrative district of Gmina Osjaków, within Wieluń County, Łódź Voivodeship, in central Poland.
