= Chotów, Łódź Voivodeship =

Village in Łódź, Poland

Chotów
- Village
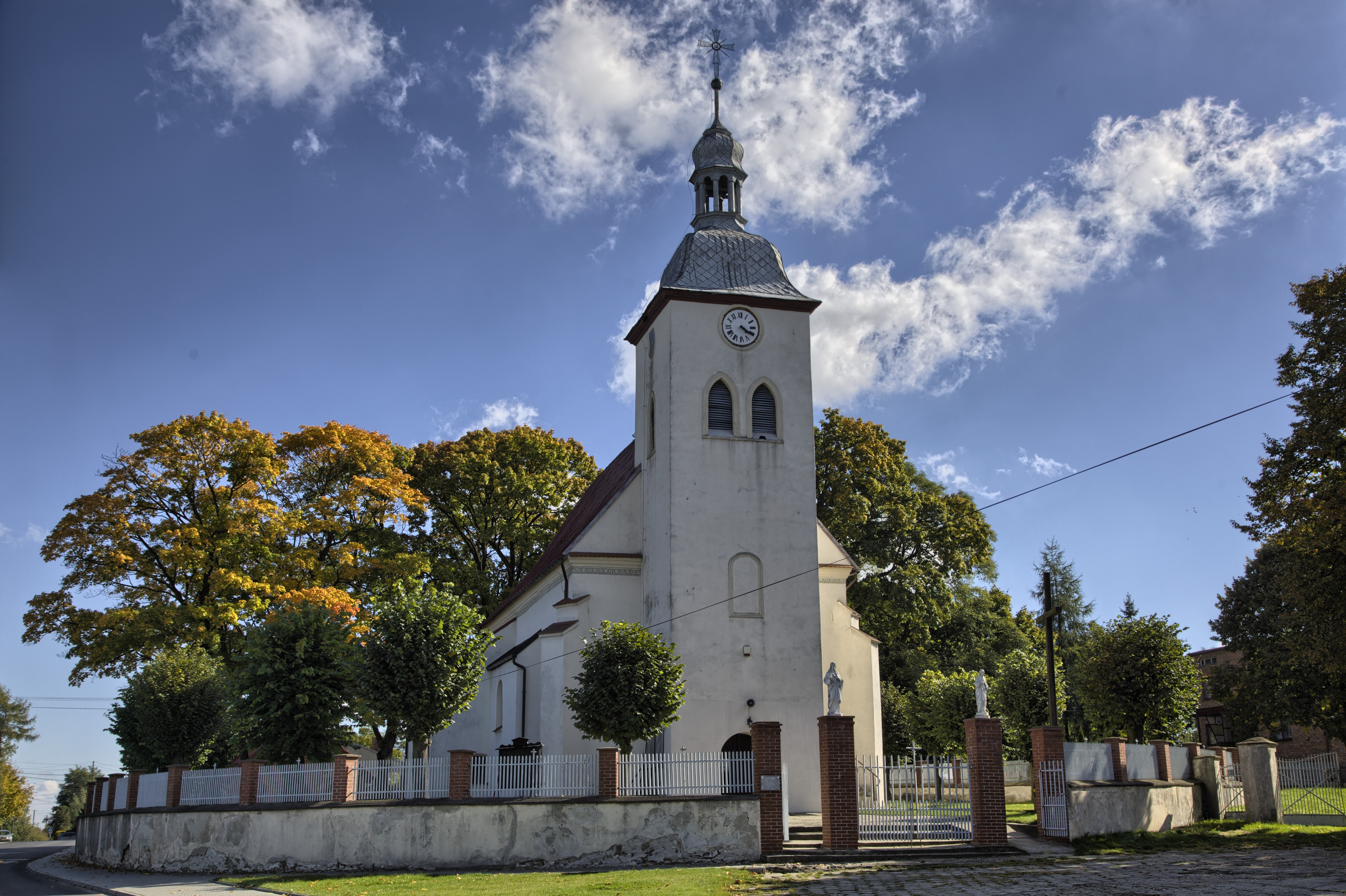
- Saint Martin church in Chotów

- Location within Poland
- Coordinates: 51°12′10″N 18°29′4″E
- Country: Poland
- Voivodeship: Łódź
- County: Wieluń
- Gmina: Mokrsko
- Time zone: UTC+1 (CET)
  - Summer (DST): UTC+2 (CEST)
- Vehicle registration: EWI

Chotów [ˈxɔtuf] is a village in the administrative district of Gmina Mokrsko, within Wieluń County, Łódź Voivodeship, in south-central Poland.

== History ==
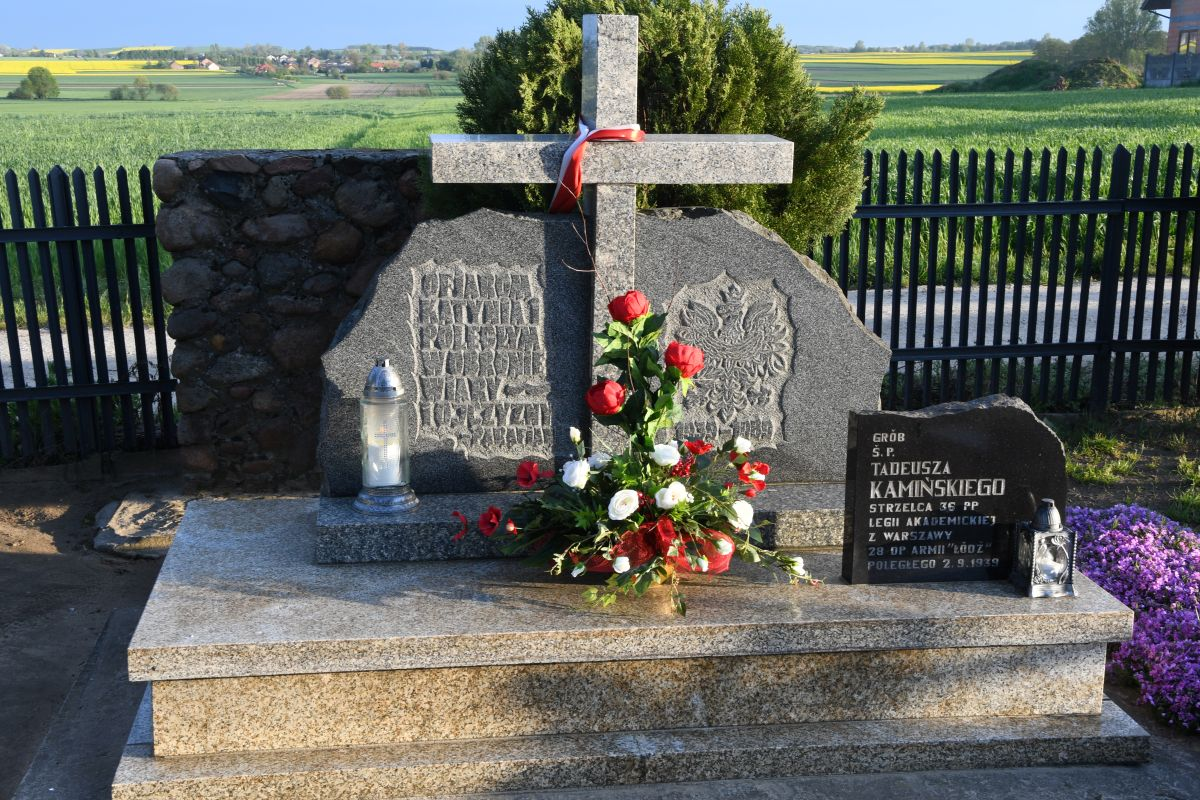
World War II memorial

The territory became a part of the emerging Polish state under its first historic ruler Mieszko I in the 10th century. The Renaissance Saint Martin church was built in 1619.

In 1827, Chotów had a population of 411.

During the German occupation of Poland (World War II), in 1940, the German gendarmerie carried out expulsions of Poles, who were either enslaved as forced labour in the region or deported to the General Government in the more eastern part of German-occupied Poland. Houses and farms of expelled Poles were handed over to German colonists as part of the Lebensraum policy.
