= Zadole, Łódź Voivodeship =

Zadole
- Settlement
- Location within Poland
- Coordinates: 51°8′20″N 18°22′50″E
- Country: Poland
- Voivodeship: Łódź
- County: Wieluń
- Gmina: Skomlin

Zadole [zaˈdɔlɛ] is a settlement in the administrative district of Gmina Skomlin, within Wieluń County, Łódź Voivodeship, in central Poland.
