= Gmina Mokrsko =

Gmina Mokrsko Mokrsko Commune
- Gmina
- Coat of arms
- Interactive map of Gmina Mokrsko
- Coordinates (Mokrsko): 51°10′29″N 18°27′46″E
- Country: Poland
- Voivodeship: Łódź
- County: Wieluń
- Seat: Mokrsko

Area
  - Total: 77.75 km^{2} (30.02 sq mi)

Population (2006)
  - Total: 5,446
  - Density: 70.05/km^{2} (181.4/sq mi)
- Website: http://www.mokrsko.akcessnet.net/

Gmina Mokrsko is a rural gmina (administrative district) in Wieluń County, Łódź Voivodeship, in central Poland. Its seat is the village of Mokrsko, which lies approximately 10 kilometres (6 mi) south-west of Wieluń and 97 km (60 mi) south-west of the regional capital Łódź.

The gmina covers an area of 77.75 square kilometres (30.0 sq mi), and as of 2006 its total population is 5,446.

== Villages ==
Gmina Mokrsko contains the villages and settlements of Brzeziny, Chotów, Jasna Góra, Jeziorko, Komorniki, Krzyworzeka, Lipie, Mątewki, Mokrsko, Mokrsko-Osiedle, Motyl, Orzechowiec, Ożarów, Poręby, Słupsko, Stanisławów and Zmyślona.

== Neighbouring gminas ==
Gmina Mokrsko is bordered by the gminas of Pątnów, Praszka, Skomlin and Wieluń.
