= Jasna Góra, Łódź Voivodeship =

Jasna Góra
- Village
- Location within Poland
- Coordinates: 51°8′48″N 18°26′50″E
- Country: Poland
- Voivodeship: Łódź
- County: Wieluń
- Gmina: Mokrsko

Jasna Góra [ˈjasna ˈɡura] is a village in the administrative district of Gmina Mokrsko, within Wieluń County, Łódź Voivodeship, in central Poland.
