= Milejów, Wieluń County =

Milejów
- Village
- Location within Poland
- Coordinates: 51°21′56″N 18°34′44″E
- Country: Poland
- Voivodeship: Łódź
- County: Wieluń
- Gmina: Ostrówek

Milejów [miˈlɛjuf] is a village in the administrative district of Gmina Ostrówek, within Wieluń County, Łódź Voivodeship, in central Poland.
