= Gmina Skomlin =

Gmina Skomlin Skomlin Commune
- Gmina
- Coat of arms
- Interactive map of Gmina Skomlin
- Coordinates (Skomlin): 51°10′16″N 18°23′16″E
- Country: Poland
- Voivodeship: Łódź
- County: Wieluń
- Seat: Skomlin

Area
  - Total: 54.95 km^{2} (21.22 sq mi)

Population (2019)
  - Total: 3,319
  - Density: 60.40/km^{2} (156.4/sq mi)
- Website: https://www.skomlin.pl

Gmina Skomlin is a rural gmina (administrative district) in Wieluń County, Łódź Voivodeship, in central Poland. Its seat is the village of Skomlin, which lies approximately 15 kilometres (9 mi) south-west of Wieluń and 102 km (63 mi) south-west of the regional capital Łódź.

The gmina covers an area of 54.95 square kilometres (21.2 sq mi), and as of 2023 its total population is 3,354.

== Villages ==
Gmina Skomlin contains the villages and settlements of Bojanów, Brzeziny, Kazimierz, Klasak Duży, Klasak Mały, Ług, Malinówka, Maręże, Skomlin, Smugi, Toplin, Walenczyzna, Wichernik, Wróblew, Wygoda, Zadole, Zbęk and Złota Góra.

== Neighbouring gminas ==
Gmina Skomlin is bordered by the gminas of Biała, Gorzów Śląski, Łubnice, Mokrsko, Praszka and Wieluń.
