= Bolków, Łódź Voivodeship =

Bolków
- Village
- Location within Poland
- Coordinates: 51°19′12″N 18°37′21″E
- Country: Poland
- Voivodeship: Łódź
- County: Wieluń
- Gmina: Ostrówek

Bolków [ˈbɔlkuf] is a village in the administrative district of Gmina Ostrówek, within Wieluń County, Łódź Voivodeship, in central Poland.
