= Ostrówek, Wieluń County =

Ostrówek
- Village
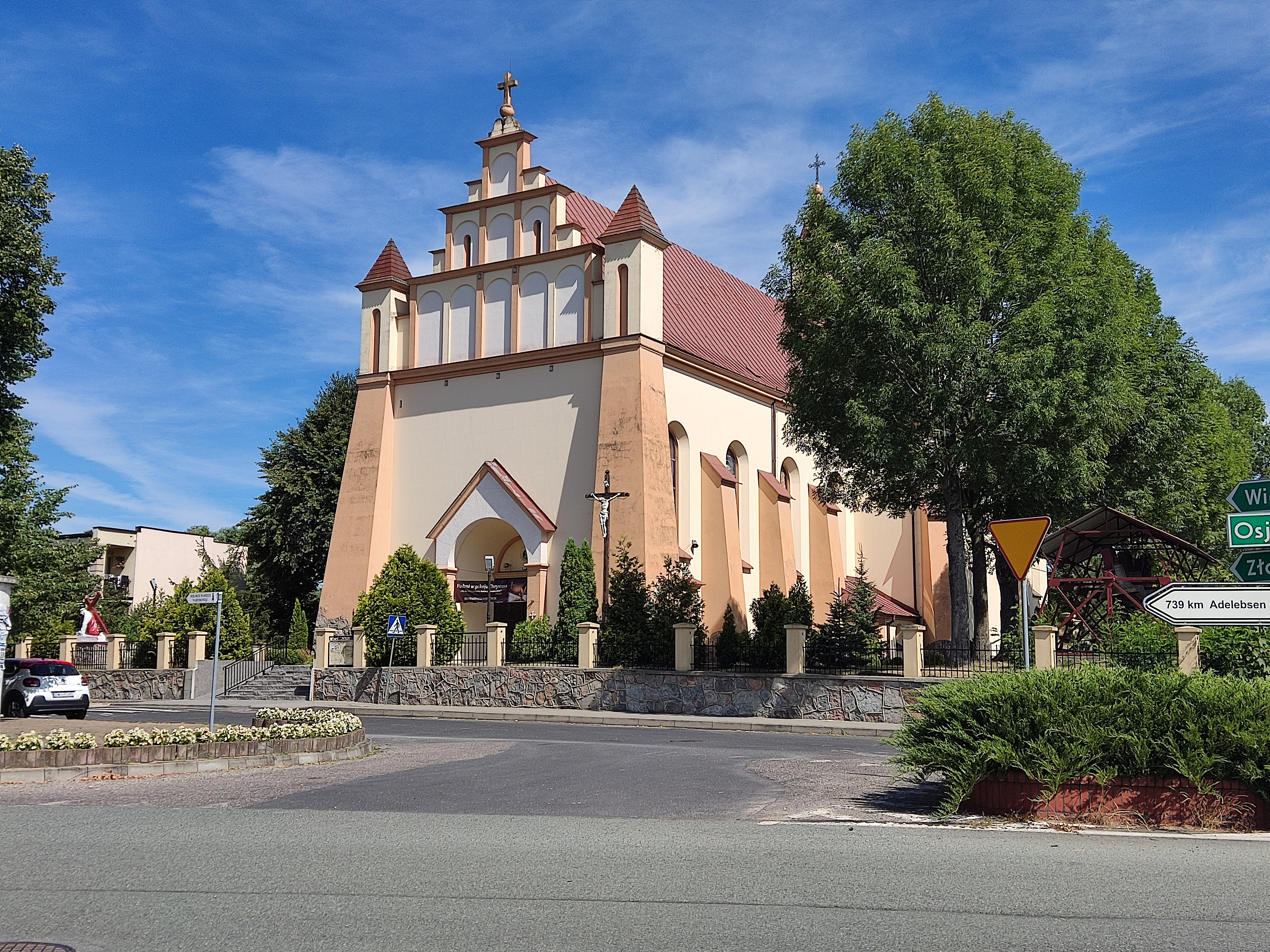
- Church of the Most Holy Trinity

- Location within Poland
- Coordinates: 51°20′11″N 18°37′5″E
- Country: Poland
- Voivodeship: Łódź
- County: Wieluń
- Gmina: Ostrówek

Population
  - Total: 520

Ostrówek [ɔsˈtruvɛk] is a village in Wieluń County, Łódź Voivodeship, in central Poland. It is the seat of the gmina (administrative district) called Gmina Ostrówek.
