= Gmina Czarnożyły =

Gmina Czarnożyły Czarnożyły Commune
- Gmina

- Coat of arms
- Interactive map of Gmina Czarnożyły
- Coordinates (Czarnożyły): 51°16′53″N 18°33′48″E
- Country: Poland
- Voivodeship: Łódź
- County: Wieluń
- Seat: Czarnożyły

Area
  - Total: 69.9 km^{2} (27.0 sq mi)

Population (2006)
  - Total: 4,591
  - Density: 65.7/km^{2} (170/sq mi)
- Time zone: UTC+1 (CET)
  - Summer (DST): UTC+2 (CEST)

Gmina Czarnożyły is a rural gmina (administrative district) in Wieluń County, Łódź Voivodeship, in central Poland. Its seat is the village of Czarnożyły, which lies approximately 7 kilometres (4 mi) north of Wieluń and 84 km (52 mi) south-west of the regional capital Łódź.

The gmina covers an area of 69.9 square kilometres (27.0 sq mi), and as of 2006 its total population is 4,591.

== Villages ==
Gmina Czarnożyły contains the villages and settlements of:

- Czarnożyły
- Działy
- Emanuelina
- Gromadzice
- Kąty
- Łagiewniki
- Leniszki
- Opojowice
- Platoń
- Raczyn
- Staw
- Stawek
- Wydrzyn

== Neighbouring gminas ==
Gmina Czarnożyły is bordered by the gminas of Biała, Lututów, Ostrówek and Wieluń.
