= Kluski, Wieluń County =

Kluski
- Village
- Location within Poland
- Coordinates: 51°4′15″N 18°39′33″E
- Country: Poland
- Voivodeship: Łódź
- County: Wieluń
- Gmina: Pątnów

Kluski [ˈkluski] is a village in the administrative district of Gmina Pątnów, within Wieluń County, Łódź Voivodeship, in central Poland.
