= Bojanów, Łódź Voivodeship =

Bojanów
- Village
- Location within Poland
- Coordinates: 51°8′55″N 18°22′35″E
- Country: Poland
- Voivodeship: Łódź
- County: Wieluń
- Gmina: Skomlin

Bojanów [bɔˈjanuf] is a village in the administrative district of Gmina Skomlin, within Wieluń County, Łódź Voivodeship, in central Poland.
