= Gmina Konopnica, Łódź Voivodeship =

Gmina Konopnica Konopnica Commune
- Gmina
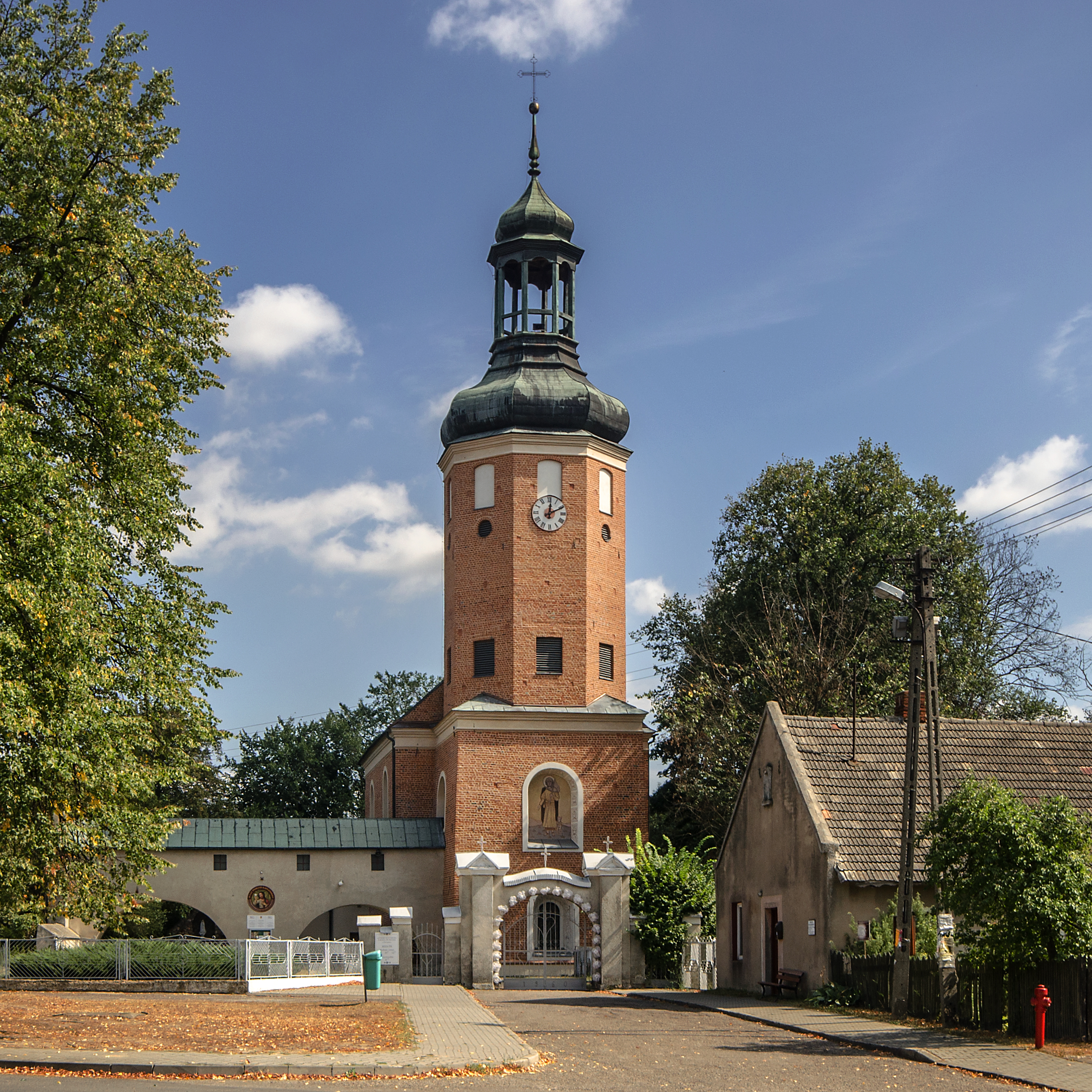

- Coat of arms
- Interactive map of Gmina Konopnica
- Coordinates (Konopnica): 51°21′14″N 18°49′24″E
- Country: Poland
- Voivodeship: Łódź
- County: Wieluń
- Seat: Konopnica

Area
  - Total: 83.06 km^{2} (32.07 sq mi)

Population (2006)
  - Total: 3,897
  - Density: 46.92/km^{2} (121.5/sq mi)
- Time zone: UTC+1 (CET)
  - Summer (DST): UTC+2 (CEST)
- Website: www.konopnica.finn.pl

Gmina Konopnica is a rural gmina (administrative district) in Wieluń County, Łódź Voivodeship, in central Poland. Its seat is the village of Konopnica, which lies approximately 23 kilometres (14 mi) north-east of Wieluń and 66 km (41 mi) south-west of the regional capital Łódź.

The gmina covers an area of 83.06 square kilometres (32.1 sq mi), and as of 2006 its total population is 3,897.

The gmina contains part of the protected area called Warta-Widawka Landscape Park.

== Villages ==
Gmina Konopnica contains the villages and settlements of:

- Anielin
- Bębnów
- Głuchów
- Kamyk
- Konopnica
- Mała Wieś
- Piaski
- Rychłocice
- Sabinów
- Strobin
- Szynkielów
- Wrońsko

== Neighbouring gminas ==
Gmina Konopnica is bordered by the gminas of Burzenin, Osjaków, Ostrówek, Rusiec, Widawa and Złoczew.
