= Bolków, West Pomeranian Voivodeship =

Bolków
- Hamlet
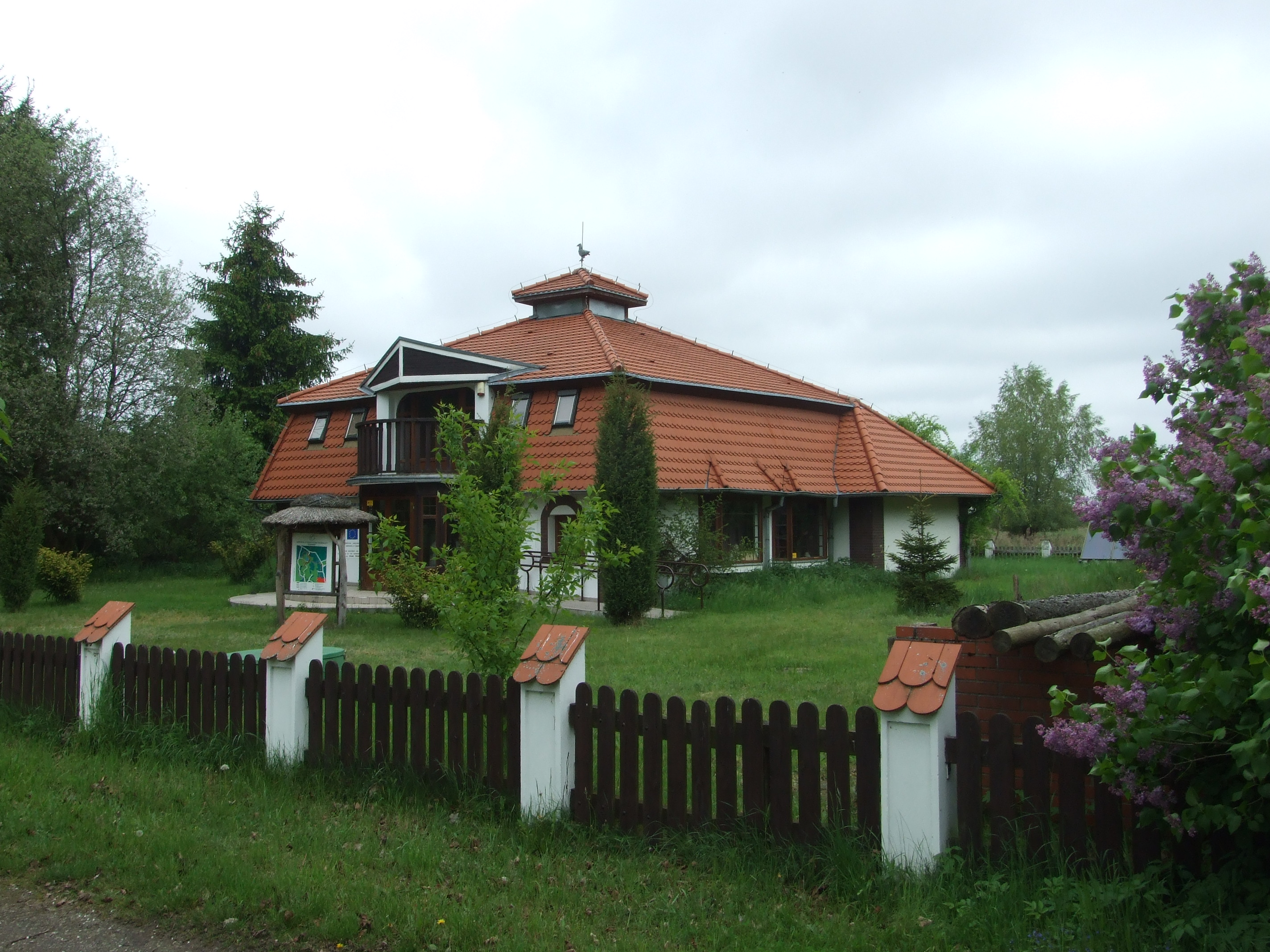
- The Świdwie Educational and Museal Centre in Bolków.

- Location within Poland
- Coordinates: 53°32′57″N 14°21′46″E
- Country: Poland
- Voivodeship: West Pomeranian
- County: Police
- Municipality: Dobra Szczecińska
- Time zone: UTC+1 (CET)
  - Summer (DST): UTC+2 (CEST)
- Postal code: 72-003
- Area code: +48 91
- Car plates: ZPL

Bolków (Polish: [ˈbɔl.kuf]; German until 1945: Schlangenhorst, Luchsloch) is a hamlet in the West Pomeranian Voivodeship, Poland, located within the municipality of Dobra Szczecińska in Police County. It includes the Świdwie Educational and Museal Centre, operated as part of the Świdwie nature reserve, dedicated to the protection of bird habitats.

== History ==
The artefacts of a hunter society from the Holocene period and the remains of a presumed shaman shrine from the Mesolithic period were discovered in Bolków. Currently, they are displayed in the Świdwie Educational and Museal Centre in the hamlet. By 1775, the settlement was part of the landed estate of Rzędziny. In 1823, it had 8 inhabitants, and in 1864, it featured one house. In 2009, the Świdwie Educational and Museal Centre was opened in Bolków as part of the Świdwie nature reserve, dedicated to the protection of bird habitats in the area.
