= Sokola coat of arms =

Polish coat of arms

Sokola
- Alternative names: Sokoł, Sokoła, Sokow, Sokół
- Families: Antoniewicz, Bakłaniec, Berens, Bernsdorf, Bystrzonowski, Drozdeński, Dziadulewicz, Dziedulewicz, Galczewski, Galecki, Gałczeński, Gałczyński, Gałecki, Gorecki, Górecki, Kołaczkowski, Kruszewski, Manicki, Maniecki, Maniewski, Morozowicz, Mrozowicz, Niedźwiecki, Niedźwiedzki, Pigłowski, Sokolikow, Sokoł, Sokołowski, Ul, Ulewicz, Zrzelski, Zych, Zychalak, Zychowicz

Sokola is a Polish coat of arms. It was used by several szlachta families in the times of the Polish–Lithuanian Commonwealth.

== History ==
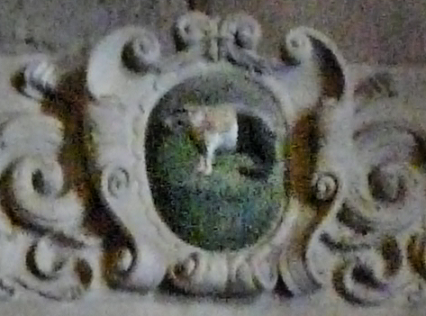
Sokola coat of arms of Marcin Gałczyński in his burial monument inside Gniezno Cathedral (circa 1573)

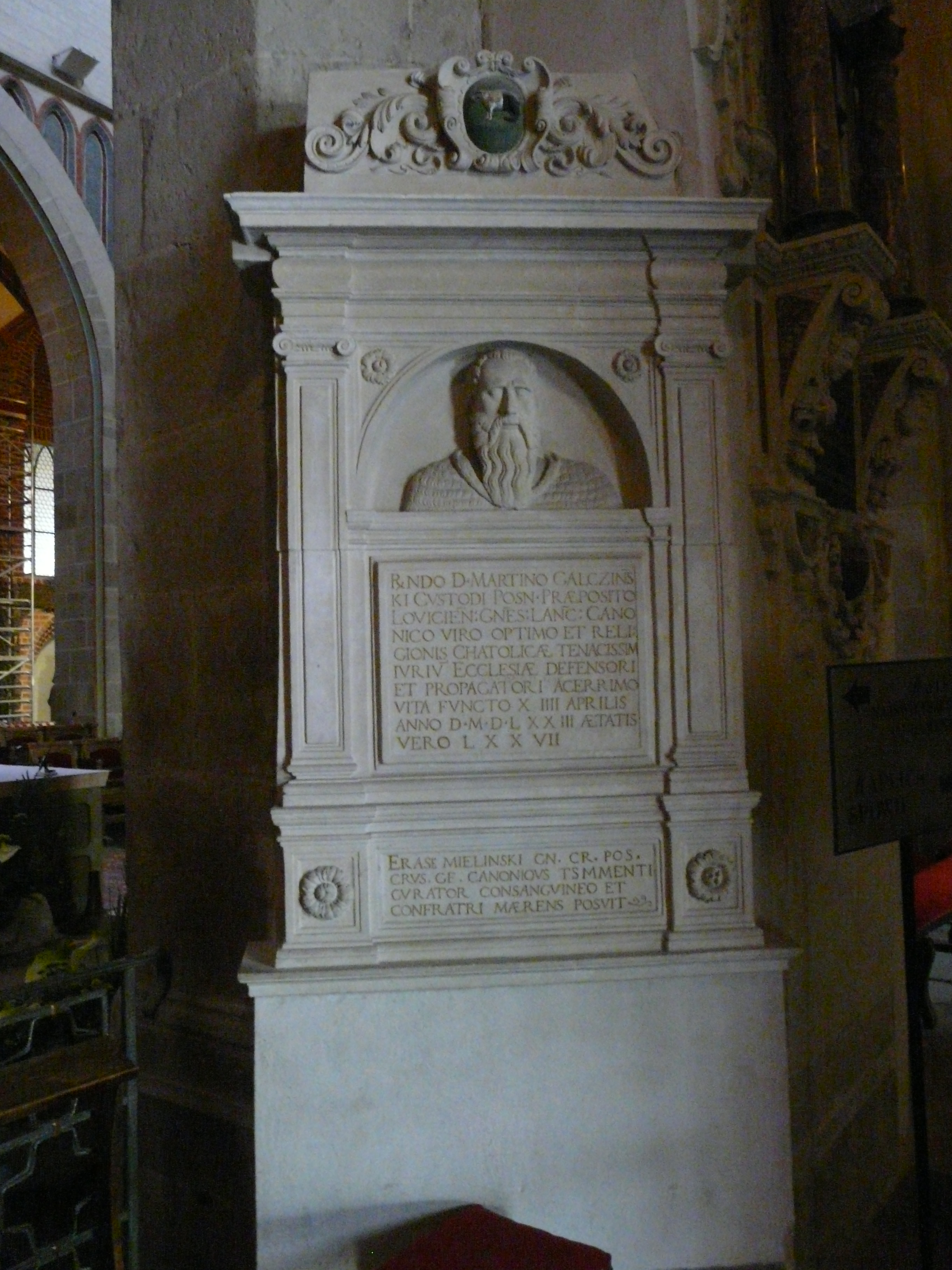
Marcin Gałczyński's burial monument in Gniezno Cathedral

== Notable bearers ==
Notable bearers of this coat of arms include:

- [Anatoliy Gałczeński]
- Jakób Gałczeński
- Marcin Gałczyński
- Józef, Piotr w okowach, Ignacy Gałczyński
- Wojciech-Woś (Gałczeński) Gałczyński
- Zbigniew Sokola-Maniecki

== See also ==
- Polish heraldry
- Heraldry
- Coat of arms
- List of Polish nobility coats of arms

== Sources ==
- Dynastic Genealogy
- Ornatowski.com
- Słownik genealogiczny - leksykon
