= Rudlice =

- Municipality
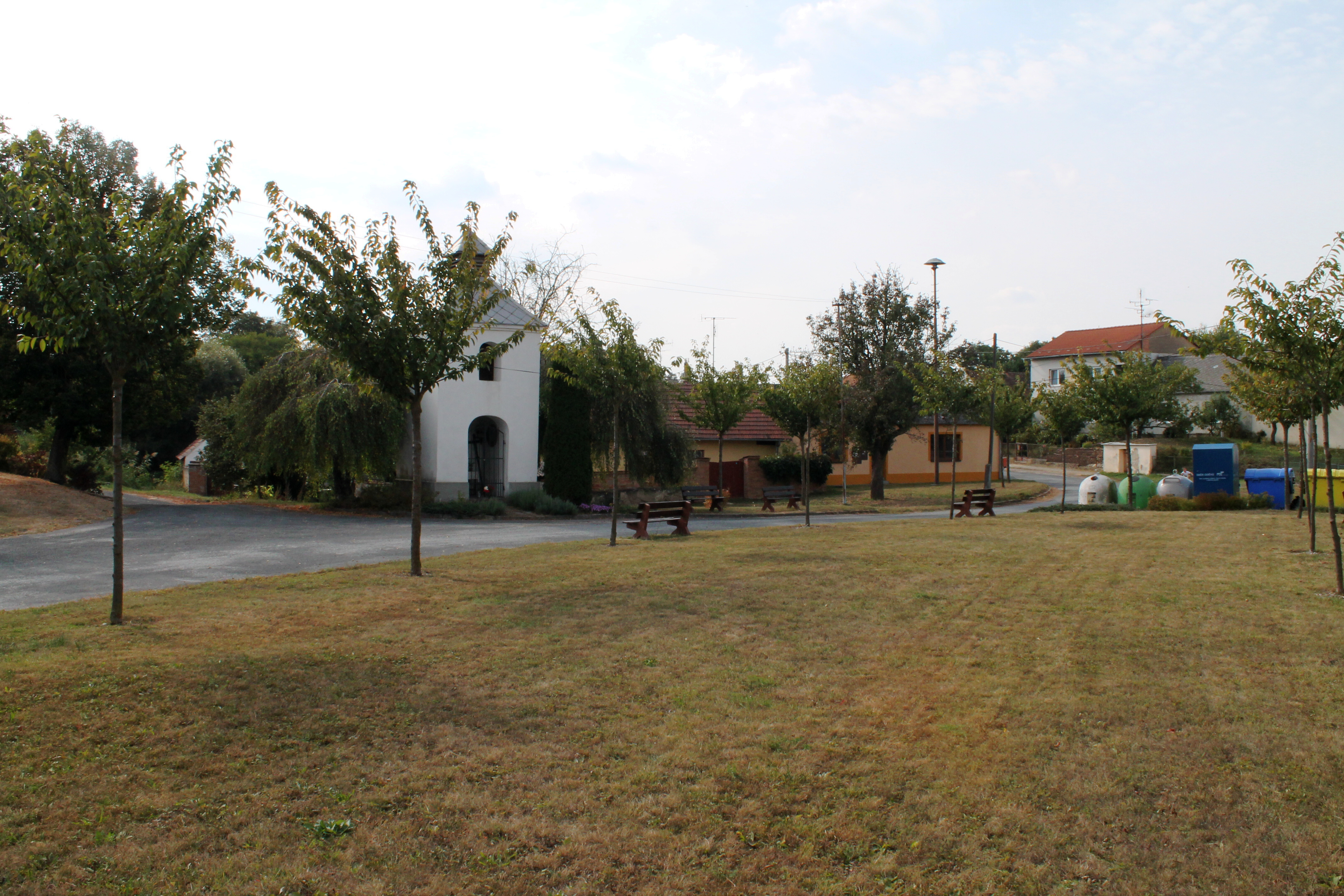
- Centre of Rudlice

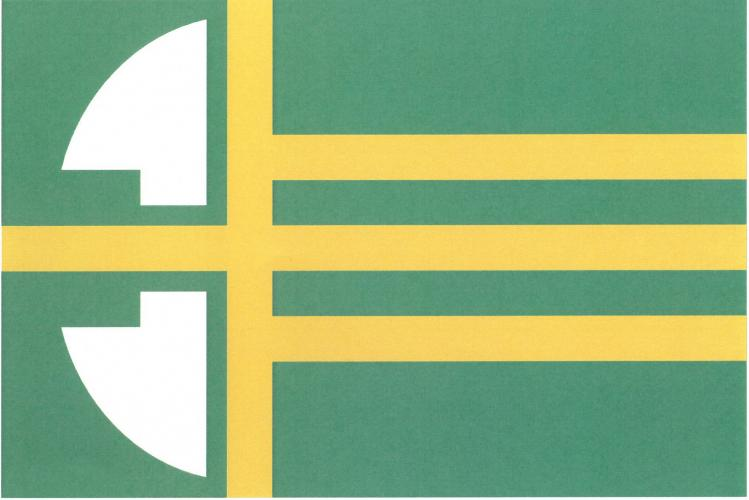
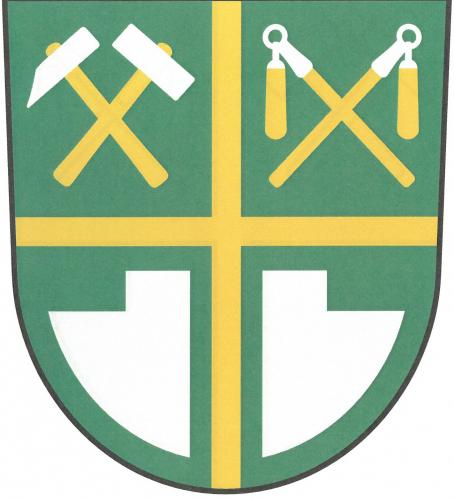
- Flag Coat of arms

- Location in the Czech Republic
- Coordinates: 48°56′55″N 16°3′57″E
- Country: Czech Republic
- Region: South Moravian
- District: Znojmo
- First mentioned: 1365

Area
  - Total: 3.81 km^{2} (1.47 sq mi)
- Elevation: 277 m (909 ft)

Population (2026-01-01)
  - Total: 110
  - Density: 29/km^{2} (75/sq mi)
- Time zone: UTC+1 (CET)
  - Summer (DST): UTC+2 (CEST)
- Postal code: 671 53
- Website: www.obecrudlice.cz

Rudlice is a municipality and village in Znojmo District in the South Moravian Region of the Czech Republic. It has about 100 inhabitants.

Rudlice lies approximately 12 kilometres (7 mi) north of Znojmo, 49 km (30 mi) south-west of Brno, and 174 km (108 mi) south-east of Prague.

== Demographics ==
Historical population
Year	Pop.	±%
1869	214	—
1880	235	+9.8%
1890	236	+0.4%
1900	229	−3.0%
1910	262	+14.4%
1921	264	+0.8%
1930	268	+1.5%
1950	207	−22.8%
1961	206	−0.5%
1970	166	−19.4%
1980	155	−6.6%
1991	138	−11.0%
2001	113	−18.1%
2011	102	−9.7%
2021	100	−2.0%
Source: Censuses
