= Wieluń County =

Wieluń County Powiat wieluński
- County
- Flag Coat of arms

- Location within the voivodeship
- Coordinates (Wieluń): 51°13′21″N 18°34′26″E
- Country: Poland
- Voivodeship: Łódź
- Seat: Wieluń
- Gminas: Total 10: Gmina Biała; Gmina Czarnożyły; Gmina Konopnica; Gmina Mokrsko; Gmina Osjaków; Gmina Ostrówek; Gmina Pątnów; Gmina Skomlin; Gmina Wieluń; Gmina Wierzchlas

Area
  - Total: 927.69 km^{2} (358.18 sq mi)

Population (2006)
  - Total: 78,260
  - Density: 84.36/km^{2} (218.5/sq mi)
  - Urban: 24,347
  - Rural: 53,913
- Car plates: EWI
- Website: www.powiat.wielun.pl

Wieluń County (Polish: powiat wieluński) is a unit of territorial administration and local government (powiat) in Łódź Voivodeship, central Poland. It came into being on 1 January 1999, as a result of the Polish local government reforms passed in 1998. Its administrative seat and only town is Wieluń, which lies 88 kilometres (55 mi) south-west of the regional capital Łódź.

The county covers an area of 927.69 square kilometres (358.2 sq mi). As of 2006 its total population is 78,260, out of which the population of Wieluń is 24,347 and the rural population is 53,913.

== Neighbouring counties ==
Wieluń County is bordered by Sieradz County to the north, Łask County to the north-east, Bełchatów County and Pajęczno County to the east, Kłobuck County to the south-east, Olesno County to the south, and Wieruszów County to the west.

== Administrative divisions ==
The county is subdivided into 10 gminas (one urban-rural and nine rural). These are listed in the following table, in descending order of population.

Gmina	Type	Area (km^{2})	Population (2006)	Seat
Gmina Wieluń	urban-rural	131.2	32,882	Wieluń
Gmina Wierzchlas	rural	119.2	6,651	Wierzchlas
Gmina Pątnów	rural	114.3	6,452	Pątnów
Gmina Biała	rural	75.0	5,503	Biała
Gmina Mokrsko	rural	77.8	5,446	Mokrsko
Gmina Osjaków	rural	100.7	4,780	Osjaków
Gmina Ostrówek	rural	101.6	4,642	Ostrówek
Gmina Czarnożyły	rural	69.9	4,591	Czarnożyły
Gmina Konopnica	rural	83.1	3,897	Konopnica
Gmina Skomlin	rural	55.0	3,416	Skomlin
