= Kazys =

Kazys (shortened from Kazimieras) is a Lithuanian masculine given name and may refer to:

- Kazys Abromavičius (born 1928), Lithuanian painter
- Kazys Almenas (born 1935), Lithuanian physicist, writer, essayist, and publisher
- Kazys Binkis (1893–1942), Lithuanian poet, journalist, and playwright
- Kazys Bizauskas (born 1893), Lithuanian statesman, diplomat, author, and one of the twenty signatories of the Act of Independence of Lithuania
- Kazys Boruta (1905–1965), Lithuanian writer and poet
- Kazys Bradūnas (1917–2009), Lithuanian émigré poet and editor
- Kazys Grinius (1866–1950) third President of Lithuania, 1926 to 1926
- Kazys Ladiga (1893–1941), Lithuanian General
- Kazys Lozoraitis (1929–2007), prominent Lithuanian diplomat and cultural activist
- Kazys Petkevičius (1926–2008), Lithuanian basketball player
- Kazys Šimonis (1887–1978), Lithuanian painter
- Kazys Škirpa (born 1895), Lithuanian military officer and diplomat
- Kazys Tallat-Kelpša (1893–1968), Lithuanian military officer
- Kazys Uscila (born 1945), Lithuanian journalist, translator of Polish and Russian literature
- Kazys Varnelis (artist) (1917–2010), abstract painter from Lithuania
- Kazys Varnelis (historian) (born 1967), historian and theorist of architecture and network culture
