= Kazimieras =

Kazimieras is a Lithuanian form of the masculine name Casimir. Its female form is Kazimiera. Its diminutive forms are Kazys and Kaziukas.

Notable people with this name include:

- Eugenijus Kazimieras Jovaiša (born 1940), Lithuanian painter
- Kazimieras Būga (1879–1924), Lithuanian linguist and philologist
- Kazimieras Gediminas Prapuolenis, or Kaz, (born 1959), American cartoonist and illustrator
- Kazimieras Garšva (born 1950), Lithuanian linguist, and the leader of the controversial "Vilnija" organisation
- Kazimieras Jaunius (1848–1908), Lithuanian priest and linguist
- Kazimieras Naruševičius (1920–2004), Lithuanian painter
- Kazimieras Steponas Šaulys (1872–1964), Lithuanian Roman Catholic priest, theologian, and signatory to the Act of Independence of Lithuania
- Kazimieras Uoka (born 1951), politician and signatory of the 1990 Act of the Re-Establishment of the State of Lithuania
- Kazimieras Vasiliauskas (born 1990), Lithuanian racing driver
- Kazimieras Venclauskis (1880–1940), Lithuanian attorney, politician, and philanthropist
- Vytautas Kazimieras Jonynas (1907–1997), one of the most renowned 20th century Lithuanian artists
