= Kuzmir =

Kuzmir may refer to:

- Kuzmir (Hasidic dynasty), Hasidic dynasty founded by Rebbe Yechezkel Taub
- Kazimierz Dolny, town in central eastern Poland
- Kazimierz, historical district of Kraków and Kraków Old Town, Poland

== See also ==
- Kazimierz (disambiguation)
