= Skorupka =

Skorupka is a surname. Notable people with the surname include:

- Ignacy Skorupka (1893–1920), Polish priest and chaplain
- Kazimierz Skorupka (1901–1943), Polish Scoutmaster and Polish Army officer
