= Casimir =

Casimir / Kazimierz
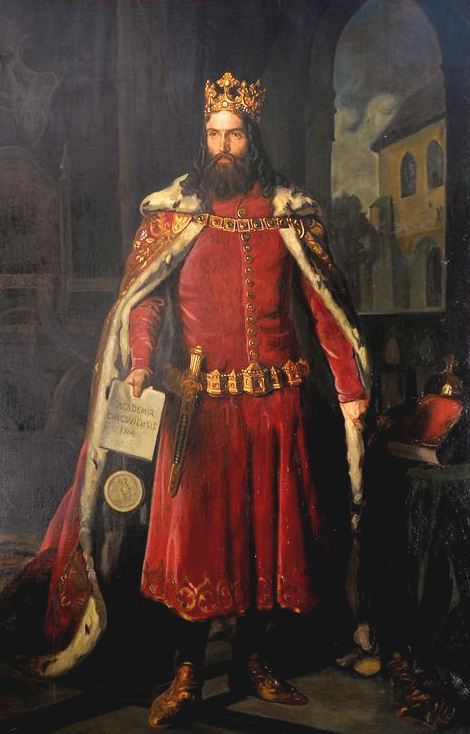
- Casimir the Great
- Gender: male

Origin
- Origin: Slavic

Other names
- Variant forms: Casimira (f), Kazimiera (f)
- Related names: Casimiro; Kazimír; Kasimir; Kažimir; Kázmér; Казимир; Kazimieras etc.

Casimir is a Latin version of the Polish male name Kazimierz (Polish pronunciation: [ka'ʑi.mjeʂ]). The original Polish feminine form is Kazimiera, in Latin and other languages rendered as Casimira. It has two possible meanings: "preacher of peace" or alternatively "destroyer of peace". There is some debate as to the origin of the prefix, as it could be from the Polish "kazac" (meaning "to preach") but is more commonly cited as coming from "kaziti" (meaning "to destroy"), with "miru" meaning "peace".

Old Polish and dialectal Polish versions are Kaźmierz and Kaźmir. Diminutive; Kazik, Kaziuk, Kaziu, Ziuk etc. It is a popular name in Poland, and was a popular name of Polish royals.

== List of variations ==
- Belarusian: Казімір, Казімер
- Catalan: Casimir
- Croatian: Kazimir, Kažimir
- Czech: Kazimír
- Esperanto: Kazimiro
- English: Casimir
- Galician: Casemiro, Casamiro
- German: Kasimir
- Hungarian: Kázmér
- Italian: Casimiro
- Latvian: Kazimirs
- Lithuanian: Kazimieras
- Polish: Kazimierz
- Portuguese: Casimiro
- Romanian: Cazimir
- Russian: Казимир
- Serbian: Казимир/Kazimir
- Slovak: Kazimír
- Slovene: Kazimir
- Spanish: Casimiro
- Swedish: Casimir
- Ukrainian: Казимир
- Vietnamese: Casimirô, Caximia

== Royalty ==
- Casimir I of Poland, Polish name Kazimierz Odnowiciel (the Restorer) (1015–1058)
- Casimir II of Poland, Polish name Kazimierz Sprawiedliwy (the Just) (1138–1194)
- Casimir III of Poland, Polish name Kazimierz Wielki (the Great) (1310–1370)
- Casimir IV Jagiellon, Polish name Kazimierz Jagielończyk, Lithuanian name Kazimieras I Jogailaitis (1427–1492)
- Casimir I, Duke of Pomerania-Demmin (after 1130–1180)
- Casimir II, Duke of Pomerania-Demmin (c. 1180 – 1219)
- Casimir III, Duke of Pomerania-Stettin (1348–1372)
- Casimir IV, Duke of Pomerania-Stolp (1351–1377)
- Saint Casimir (1458–1484), patron saint of Lithuania and Poland
- Casimir I of Opole (1178/79–1230), Polish duke
- Casimir, Margrave of Brandenburg-Bayreuth between 1515 and 1527
- John Casimir of the Palatinate-Simmern (1543–1592), Count Palatine of Simmern and regent of the Electorate of the Palatinate from 1583 to 1592
- Friedrich Casimir, Count of Hanau-Lichtenberg (1623–1685)
- Charles Edward Louis John Casimir Sylvester Severino Maria Stuart ("Bonnie Prince Charlie"), Jacobite pretender to the thrones of England, Scotland, France and Ireland

== People with name Casimir, Kazimir, etc. ==
- Casimir, Comte de Montrond (1768–1843)
- Casimiro de Abreu, Brazilian poet and novelist, adept of the "Ultra-Romanticism" movement
- Kázmér Batthyány, Hungarian politician who served as Minister of Foreign Affairs during the Hungarian Revolution of 1848
- Kasimir Bileski, Canadian philatelist and stamp-dealer based in Winnipeg, Manitoba, Canada
- Casimir Bizimungu, Rwandan politician
- Count Kasimir Felix Badeni, Minister-President of the Austrian half of the Austro-Hungarian Empire from 1895 until 1897
- Casimir Delavigne, French poet and dramatist
- Casimiro Díaz, Spanish friar of the Augustinian order (vows in 1710), who accompanied the first Spanish expedition to the Cordillera
- Casimir Dudevant, French nobleman
- Casimir Ehrnrooth, Finnish magnate, former chairman of Nokia Corporation
- Casimir Funk (Kazimierz Funk), Polish biochemist, generally credited with the first formulation of the concept of vitamins in 1912, which he called vital amines or vitamines
- Casimiro Gennari, Italian Cardinal
- Kasimir Graff, German astronomer
- Jean Casimir Félix Guyon, French surgeon and urologist born on Ile-Bourbon (Réunion)
- Kazimír Gajdoš, Slovak footballer
- Casimir Gzowski (1813–1898), engineer and acting Lieutenant Governor of Ontario
- Casimir Lefaucheux, French gunsmith
- Casimir Lewy, Polish-born British philosopher
- Casimir Liberski, Belgian jazz-musician who plays piano and electric keyboard
- Casimir Loxsom, American middle-distance runner who specialises in the 800 metres
- Kazimir Malevich, Ukrainian artist, pioneer of geometric abstract art and the originator of the Avant-garde Suprematist movement
- Casimir Ney, French composer and one of the foremost violists of the 19th century
- Casimir Oyé-Mba, Gabonese politician
- Casimir Pierre Perier, French statesman, president of the council during the July Monarchy
- Casimir Pilenas, private investigator and British intelligence agent
- Casimir Pulaski, Polish soldier, member of the Polish nobility and politician who has been called "the father of American cavalry"
- Casimir Reuterskiöld, Swedish sport-shooter who competed in the 1920 Summer Olympics
- Kazimir Sas, Australian film and television actor, known for his work on children's television series
- Casimir Stapko (1913–2006), American portrait painter
- Kazimir Strzepek, cartoonist living in Seattle, Washington
- Casimir Zagourski (Polish: Kazimierz Zagórski), pioneering photographer of Central African peoples and customs
- Casimir Zeglen, Polish pastor and inventor of a bullet-resistant cloth
- Casemiro, Brazilian footballer
- Casimiro Miguel, Brazilian sports commentator and streamer

== People with name Kazimierz ==
- Kazimierz Ajdukiewicz, Polish philosopher and logician
- Kazimierz Bartel, Polish mathematician and politician who served as Prime Minister of Poland three times between 1926 and 1930
- Kazimierz Brandys, Polish essayist and writer of film scripts
- Kazimierz Brodziński, Polish Romantic poet
- Kazimierz Deyna, Polish football player, one of the best marksmen in the history of world football
- Kazimierz Fabrycy, Polish general, member of the Polish Legions in World War I, fought in the Polish Soviet War
- Kazimierz Fajans, American physical chemist of Polish origin and a pioneer in the science of radioactivity
- Kazimierz Górecki, Polish sprint canoer who competed in the mid-1970s
- Kazimierz Konopka, Polish activist
- Kazimierz Kord, Polish conductor
- Kazimierz Kuratowski, Polish mathematician and logician, one of the leading representatives of the Warsaw School of Mathematics
- Kazimierz Kutz, Polish film director, author, journalist and politician, one of the representatives of the Polish Film School and a deputy speaker of the Senate of Poland
- Kazimierz Malewicz, Russian-Polish artist and painter
- Kazimierz Marcinkiewicz, Polish conservative politician who served as Prime Minister of Poland from 31 October 2005 to 14 July 2006
- Kazimierz Michałowski, Polish archaeologist and Egyptologist, and the founder of Nubiology
- Kazimierz Orlik-Łukoski, Polish military commander and one of the Generals of the Polish Army murdered by the Soviet Union in the Katyń massacre of 1940
- Kazimierz Plater, Polish chess master
- Kazimierz Poniatowski, Polish Szlachcic, podkomorzy wielki koronny (1742–1773), generał wojsk koronnych, Knight of the Order of the White Eagle
- Kazimierz Prószyński, Polish inventor in the field of cinema
- Kazimierz Przerwa-Tetmajer, Polish poet, novelist, playwright, journalist and writer, member of the Young Poland movement
- Kazimierz Sabbat, President of Poland in Exile from 8 April 1986 until his death, 19 July 1989, after serving (from 1976) as Prime Minister of the Polish Government in Exile
- Maciej Kazimierz Sarbiewski (1595–1640), the first Polish poet to become widely celebrated abroad
- Kazimierz Serocki, Polish composer and one of the founders of the Warsaw Autumn contemporary music festival
- Kazimierz Siemienowicz, Polish general of artillery, gunsmith, military engineer, artillery specialist and pioneer of rocketry
- Kazimierz Sosnkowski, Polish independence fighter, politician and Polish Army general
- Kazimierz Skorupka, Polish scoutmaster and army officer
- Kazik Staszewski, Polish rock musician, leader of the band Kult
- Kazimierz Świtalski, Polish officer, politician, and a Prime Minister of Poland
- Kazimierz Michał Ujazdowski, Polish politician
- Kazimierz Urbanik (1930–2005), Polish mathematician
- Kazimierz de Weydlich, Polish chess master
- Kazimierz Zarankiewicz, Polish mathematician
- Kazimierz Żorawski, Polish mathematician

== People with surname Casimir ==
- Artur von Casimir (1907–2005), German pilot
- Auguste Casimir-Perier, French diplomat; son of Casimir Pierre Perier and father of President Jean Casimir-Perier
- Ernst Casimir, count of Nassau-Dietz and Stadtholder of Friesland, Groningen and Drenthe
- J. R. Ralph Casimir (1898–1996), Dominican poet, editor and pan-Africanist organiser
- Jean Casimir-Perier, French politician, fifth president of the French Third Republic
- Kirsten Casimir (born 1978), West Indian cricketer
- Hendrik Casimir (1909–2000), Dutch physicist
- Raymond Casimir (born 1976), West Indian cricketer
- Rosanne Casimir, Chief of Tkʼemlúps te Secwépemc

== Characters ==
- Casimir (dinosaur), on the French TV show l'Île aux enfants

== See also ==
- Casimir effect, a physical force arising from quantum fluctuations of a field
- Kazimierz (disambiguation)
- Kazimiera, feminine form and notable bearers
- Kazimieras, Lithuanian form and notable bearers
- Casmir (disambiguation), a surname
- Casemiro
