= Casimir of Poland =

Casimir of Poland may refer to:

- Any ruler of Poland named Casimir:
  - Duke Casimir I the Restorer (1016–58)
  - High Duke Casimir II the Just (1138–94)
  - King Casimir III the Great (1310–70)
  - King Casimir IV Jagiellon (1427–92)
- Saint Casimir (1458–84), Polish–Lithuanian prince

== See also ==
- Kazimierz (disambiguation), the Polish form of the name Casimir
