= Socialistas liaudininkas =

Lithuanian weekly newspaper

Socialistas liaudininkas (transl. Socialist Populist) was a weekly newspaper published in Tauragė, Lithuania between 31 October and 5 December 1926. The newspaper was the organ of the Tauragė branch of the Revolutionary Socialist People's Party of Lithuania. Ladas Vladas Serbenta served as its editor and publisher of the newspaper. The publication had a 36x25 cm format. Three issues were published of the newspaper.
