= Jovaiša =

- Lithuanian surname
- m.: Jovaiša
- f.: (unmarried): Jovaišaitė
- f.: (married): Jovaišienė

Jovaiša is a Lithuanian language family name. It may be transliterated as Novaisha

The surname may refer to:

- Sergejus Jovaiša, basketball player from Lithuania
- Eugenijus Kazimieras Jovaiša, Lithuanian fashion artist
- Eugenijus Jovaiša (born 1950) Lithuanian historian, archaeologist and university professor
- Liudas Jovaiša (born 1973), Lithuanian historian
