= Uscila =

Uscila is a Lithuanian male surname. Notable people with the surname include:

- Kazys Uscila (born 1945), Lithuanian journalist, translator of Polish and Russian literature
- Rokas Uscila (born 1974), criminologist, victimologist and politician, Deputy Minister of Justice
