= Anachów =

Anachów Dwór Anny
- Village
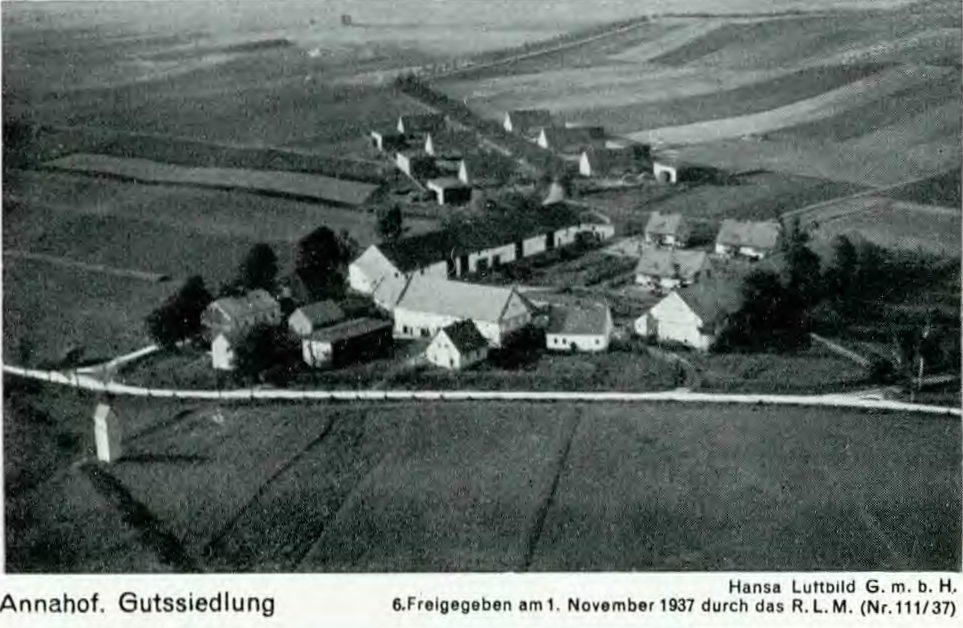
- Anachów in 1937

- Location within Poland
- Coordinates: 50°17′52″N 17°53′54″E
- Country: Poland
- Voivodeship: Opole
- County: Prudnik
- Gmina: Głogówek
- Established: 19th century

Population (2019)
  - Total: 0
- Time zone: UTC+1 (CET)
  - Summer (DST): UTC+2
- Postal code: 48-250
- Area code: +4877
- Vehicle registration: OPR

Anachów [aˈnaxuf] (German: Annahof), additional name: Dwór Anny, is a village in the administrative district of Gmina Głogówek, within Prudnik County, Opole Voivodeship, south-western Poland. It is situated in the historical region of Prudnik Land. The village is uninhabited.

== Geography ==
The village is located in the southern part of Opole Voivodeship, close to the Czech Republic–Poland border. It is situated in the historical Prudnik Land region, as well as in Upper Silesia. It lies in the Silesian Lowlands, on a slightly elevated part of the terrain. A road from Kazimierz to Kózki leads through Anachów. The National Register of Geographical Names for 2025 classified Anachów as a hamlet (przysiółek) of Kazimierz.

== Etymology ==
In Topographisches Handbuch von Oberschlesien, published in 1865, Felix Triest noted the village's German name as Annavorwerk. Until 1945, the name of the village was Annahof.

Following the Second World War, the Polish name Kolonia Świętej Anny was introduced by the Commission for the Determination of Place Names. However, the name was not adopted by the local population, who instead called the village Anachów. In August 2001, Gmina Głogówek decided to formally change the village's name to Anachów. The new name was accepted by the government in 2003. The village has an additional name of Dwór Anny.

== History ==
The village was established in the 19th century as a folwark belonging to Kazimierz. Meyers Gazetteer noted that there were 44 people living in Anachów.

Following the Second World War, from March to May 1945, Prudnik County was controlled by the Soviet military commandant's office. On 11 May 1945, it was passed on to the Polish administration. In the early 1950s, ten families lived in Anachów, including autochthonous Silesians, as well as Cracovians who settled here after the war. The residents began gradually leaving the village during the communist era, among other reasons due to the lack of a water supply. In 1966, there were 35 people living in Anachów.

In 2006, due to most houses being abandoned, thieves started frequenting the village. It had 2 inhabitants in 2013. Its last resident died in 2019. According to local press, the abandoned village of Anachów has a local reputation as a "haunted" place. Various alleged paranormal phenomena were reported to have occurred here.
