= Casmir =

Casmir may refer to:

- Agu Casmir (born 1984), Nigerian professional soccer player
- Norman Casmir (born 1930), German fencer
- Erwin Casmir (1895–1982), German fencer
- Gustav Casmir (1874–1910), German fencer
- St. Casmir Church Mathilil, a church in Mathilil, Kerala, India

== See also ==
- CASMIRC
- Casimir
- Casimir effect
