= Nerija Putinaitė =

Lithuanian philosopher and politician

Nerija Putinaitė (born 19 May 1971 in Tauragė, Lithuania) is a Lithuanian philosopher and politician, Vice-minister of the Ministry of Science and Education of the Republic of Lithuania.

== Biography ==
Nerija studied from 1989 to 1996 at the Philosophy Faculty of the Vilnius universitetas the bachelor's and master's degree in philosophy and from 1996 to 2000 the doctoral program at the Lietuvos filosofijos ir sociologijos institutas and a doctorate on "justice problem in the philosophy of Immanuel Kant", worked as a research assistant at the institute. Putinaitė continued her education at the University of Marburg, University of Greifswald, Tübingen and Poitiers (France). In 2004, she completed International Summer Courses in Weimar.

Since 2004 Nerija Putinaitė had been working at the Office of the President of the Republic of Lithuania as the advisor for research and higher education.

Putinatė was a research fellow at the Lithuanian philosophy and sociology institute (now Institute of Culture, philosophy and art) and a docent at the Department of Ethics of Vilnius Pedagogical University (now Lithuanian University of Educational Sciences).

Putinaitė has authored or edited a number of books and articles on a variety of topics, such as Kant's philosophy, Lithuanian culture, ethics and philosophy of culture.
