= Tauragė Castle =

Castle in Tauragė, Lithuania

- Tauragės pilis (Lithuanian)
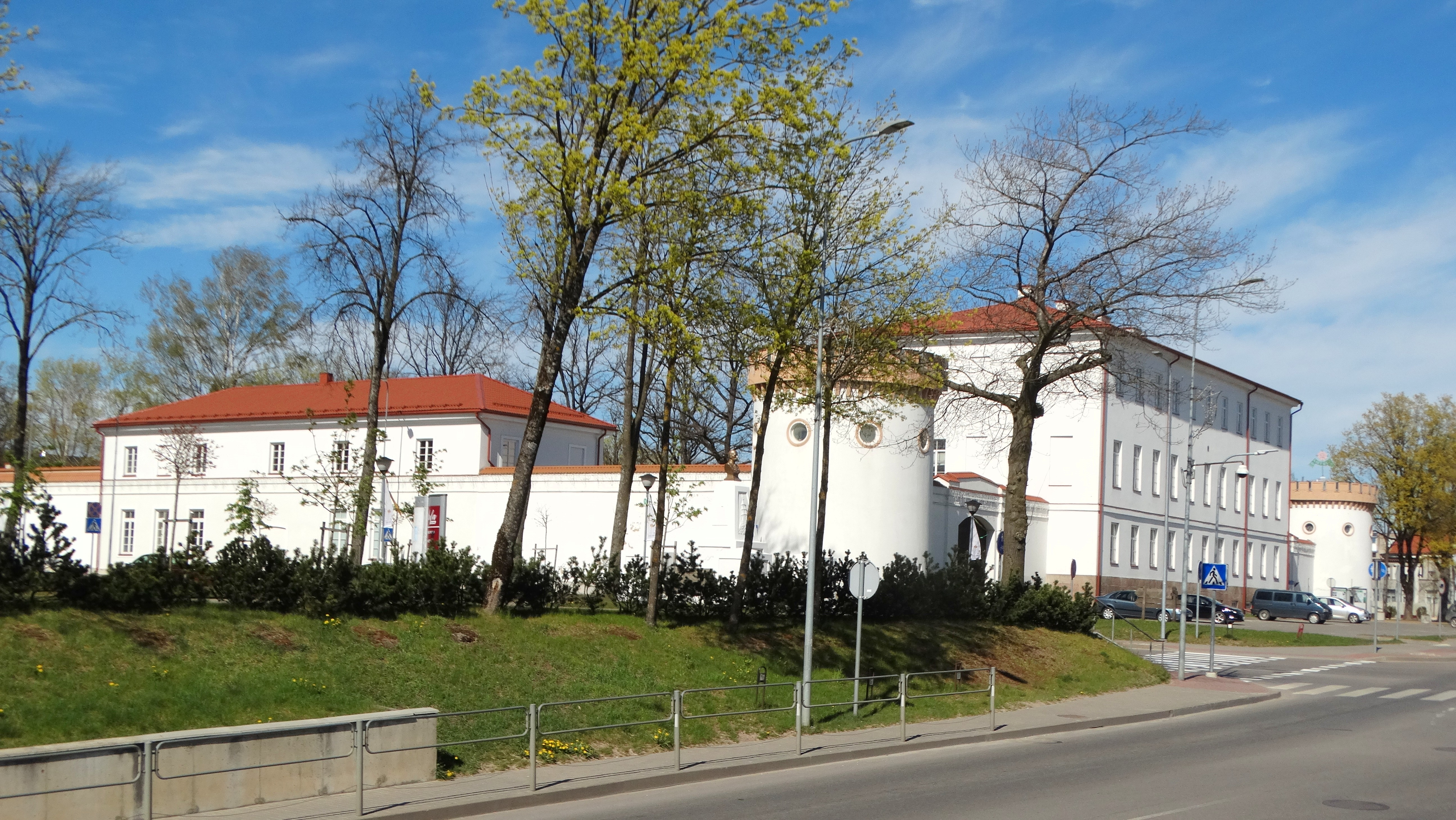
- Interactive map of Tauragė Castle
- 55.2526°N 22.2842°E
- Type: Castle and residential manor
- Location: Tauragė, Lithuania

History
- Built: 1844 – 1847

Site notes
- Architectural style: Renaissance
- Website: Official website

Tauragė Castle (Lithuanian: Tauragės pilis) is a 19th-century masonry building in Tauragė, near the Baltic Coast. It was originally built between 1844 and 1847 to serve as a customs building.

== History ==
A major fire devastated Tauragė in 1836. Consequently, the Tsarist authorities issued an order to prepare a new project for the city's construction that included a customs house that later became Tauragė Castle.

The initial two-story customs building was completed in 1847. The initial building also served as a prison for smugglers and illegal immigrants. The compound was expanded in the late 19th century with a bathhouse, sauna, water well, several auxiliary buildings and stone wall with corner towers. The compound was later expanded twice – new buildings were added in 1971 and 1986.

Since the 1900s, this castle has been repurposed multiple times and has housed psychiatric hospital, county hospital, military barracks and commerce school. It has also housed a middle school and a restaurant.

== In modern times ==
Tauragė Castle houses a museum and children's library. The castle also hosts various exhibitions, events and celebrations.

== Gallery ==
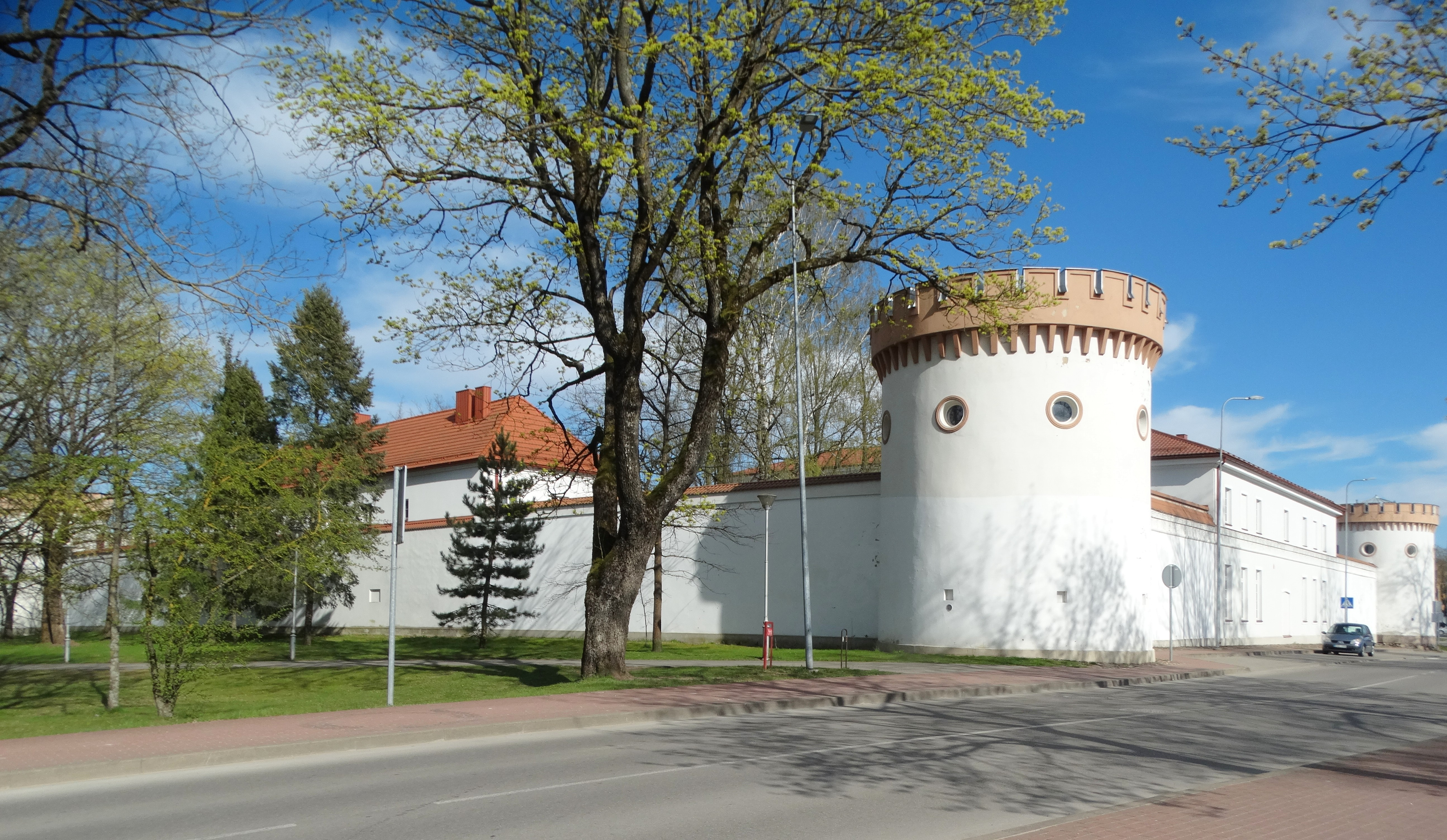
Castle from up close

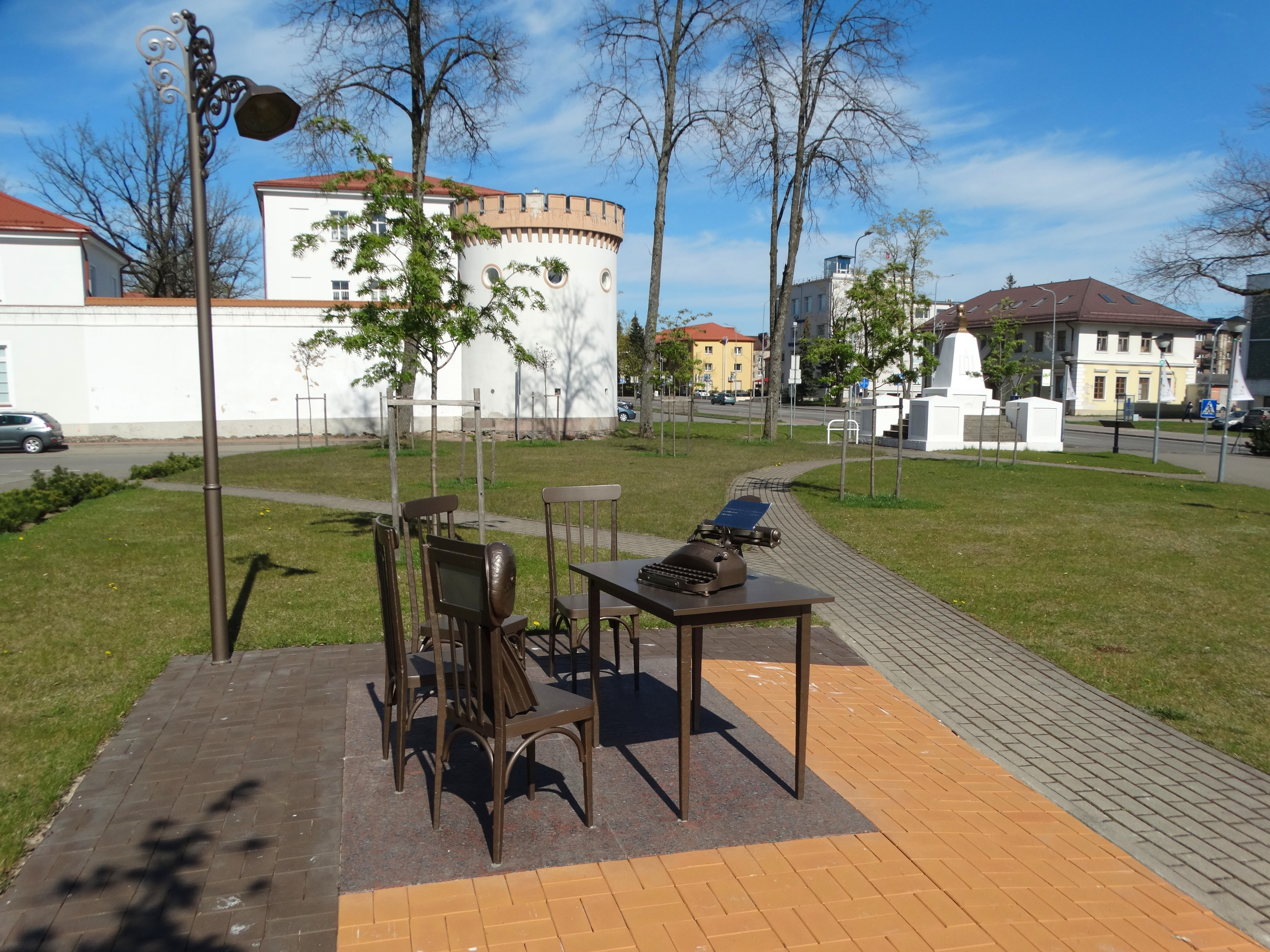
Park next to the castle

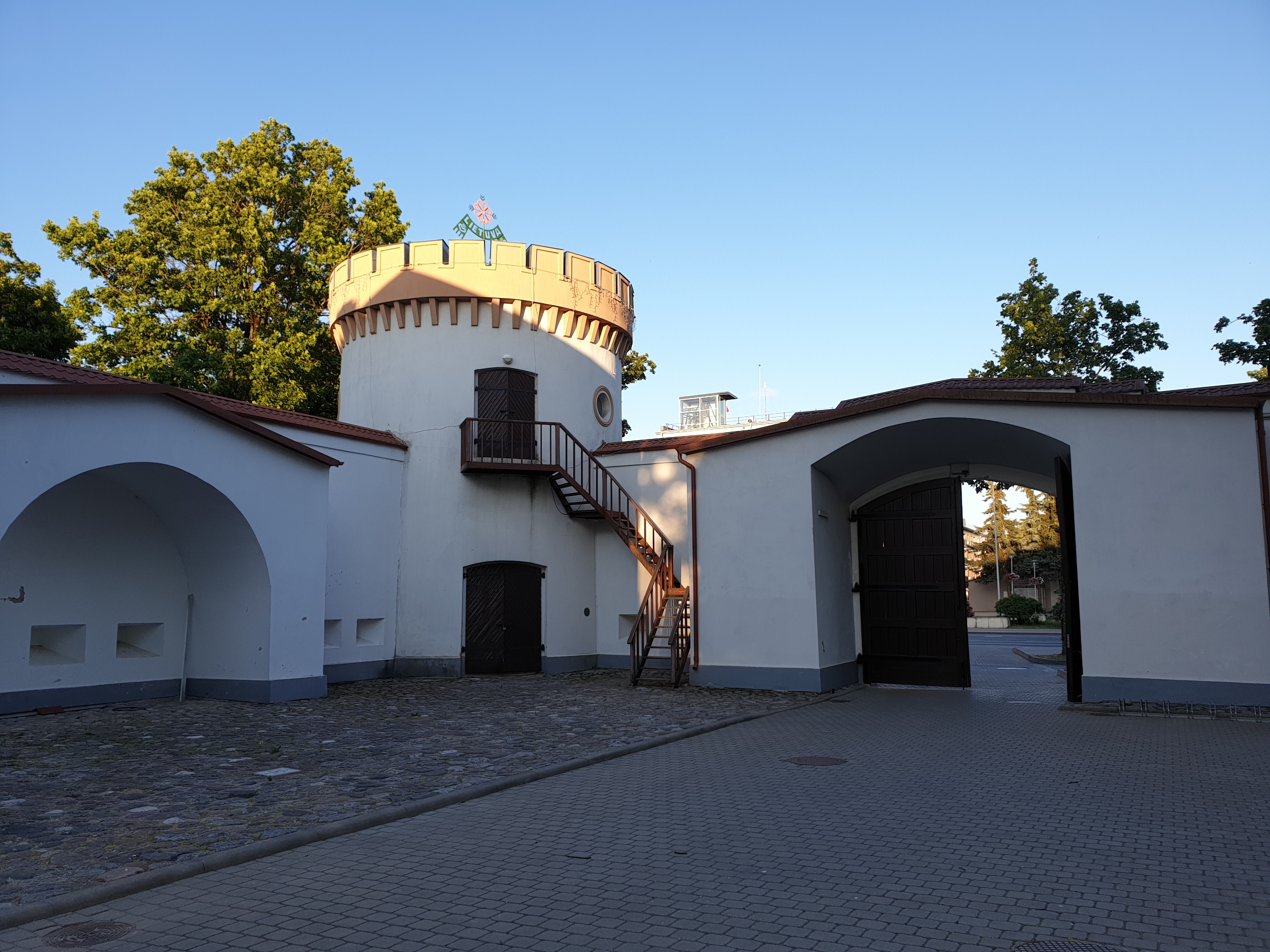
Exit

== See also ==
- List of castles in Lithuania
