= Kazimierz, Opole Voivodeship =

Kazimierz
- Village
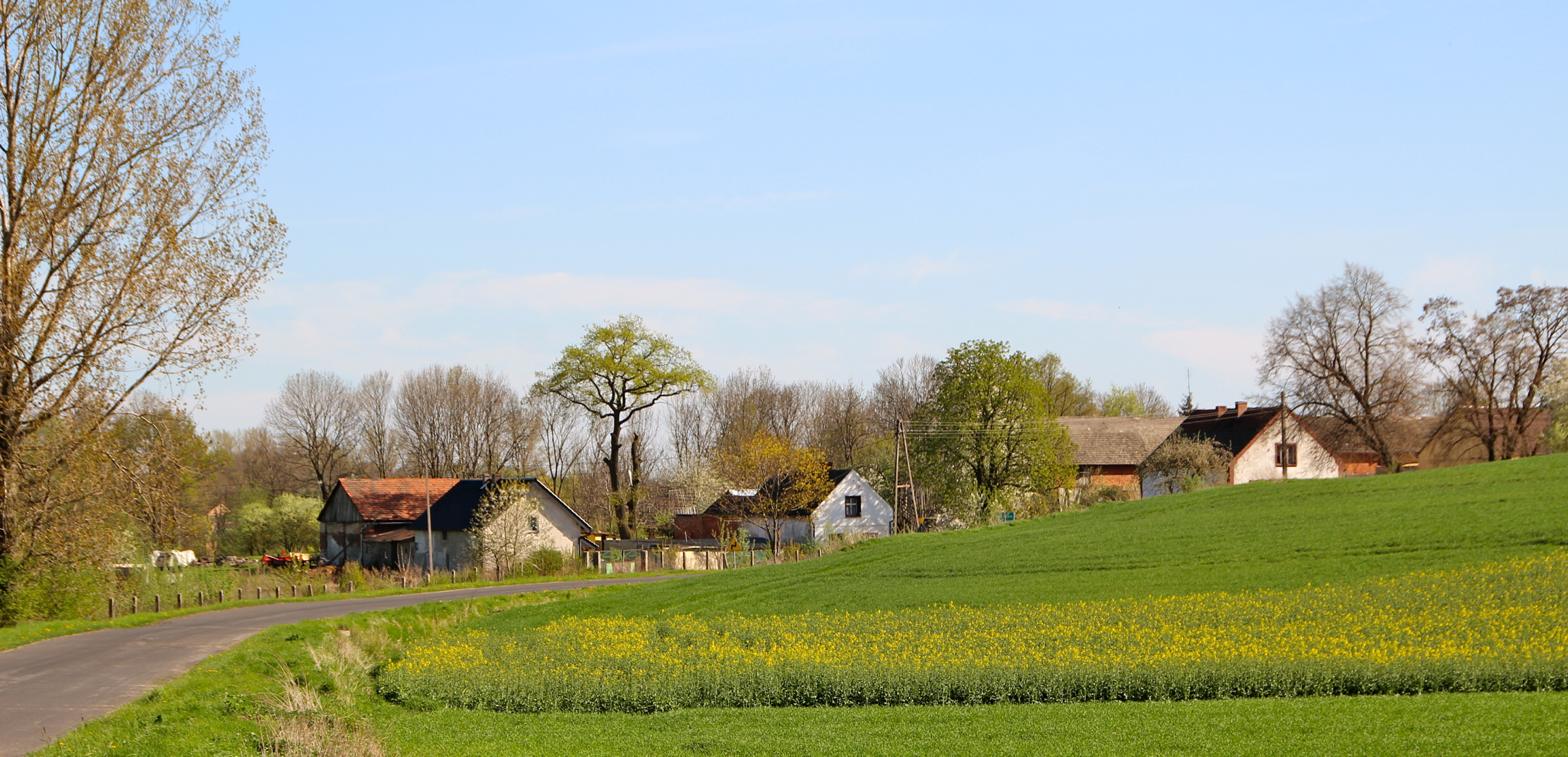

- Location within Poland
- Coordinates: 50°17′52″N 17°53′37″E
- Country: Poland
- Voivodeship: Opole
- County: Prudnik
- Gmina: Głogówek
- Founded: 12th century
- Named for: Casimir I of Opole

Population
  - Total: 380
- Time zone: UTC+1 (CET)
  - Summer (DST): UTC+2 (CEST)
- Vehicle registration: OPR

Kazimierz (Polish: [kaˈʑimjɛʂ], German: Kasimir) is a village in the administrative district of Gmina Głogówek, within Prudnik County, Opole Voivodeship, in southern Poland. It is situated in the historical region of Prudnik Land in Upper Silesia.

As of 31 December 2021, the village's population numbered 329 inhabitants.

== Geography ==
The village is located in the southern part of Opole Voivodeship, close to the Czech Republic–Poland border. It is situated in the historical Prudnik Land region, as well as in Upper Silesia. It lies in the Silesian Lowlands, in the valley of Stradunia river.

=== Integral parts ===
According to the National Register of Geographical Names for 2025, the village of Kazimierz had 2 integral parts, divided into:

- 1 hamlet (przysiółek wsi): Anachów
- 1 part of the village (część wsi): Damasko

== Etymology ==
The village's name was derived from the Polish name Kazimierz (Casimir). It was named after duke Casimir I of Opole. Initially, it was named Jaroslav, after duke Jarosław. The name was adopted into the German language as Kasimir. In Czech, the village was known as Kaziměř. Following the Second World War, the historic Polish name Kazimierz was declated official by the Commission for the Determination of Place Names.

== History ==
There are archaeological sites of the Neolithic and the Lusatian culture in Kazimierz. There existed a settlement in the area of the present-day village of Kazimierz in the late 12th and the early 13th century. Artifacts from the Early Middle Ages were found in the village.

The village was established in late 12th century. It was initially named Jarosław (Jaroslav), after duke Jarosław of Opole. The duke settled the village with monks of the Cistercian order from Pforta, Saxony. After the duke's death in 1201, the Cistercians from Pforta transferred the ownership of the village to the Cistercians of Lubiąż. In 1213, a new name of the village was recorded as Kazimierz (Cazemiria)—after duke Casimir I of Opole. Between 1213 and 1217, duke Casimir I, obtained town privileges for Kazimierz. The first recorded mention of the local Catholic church was in 1223.

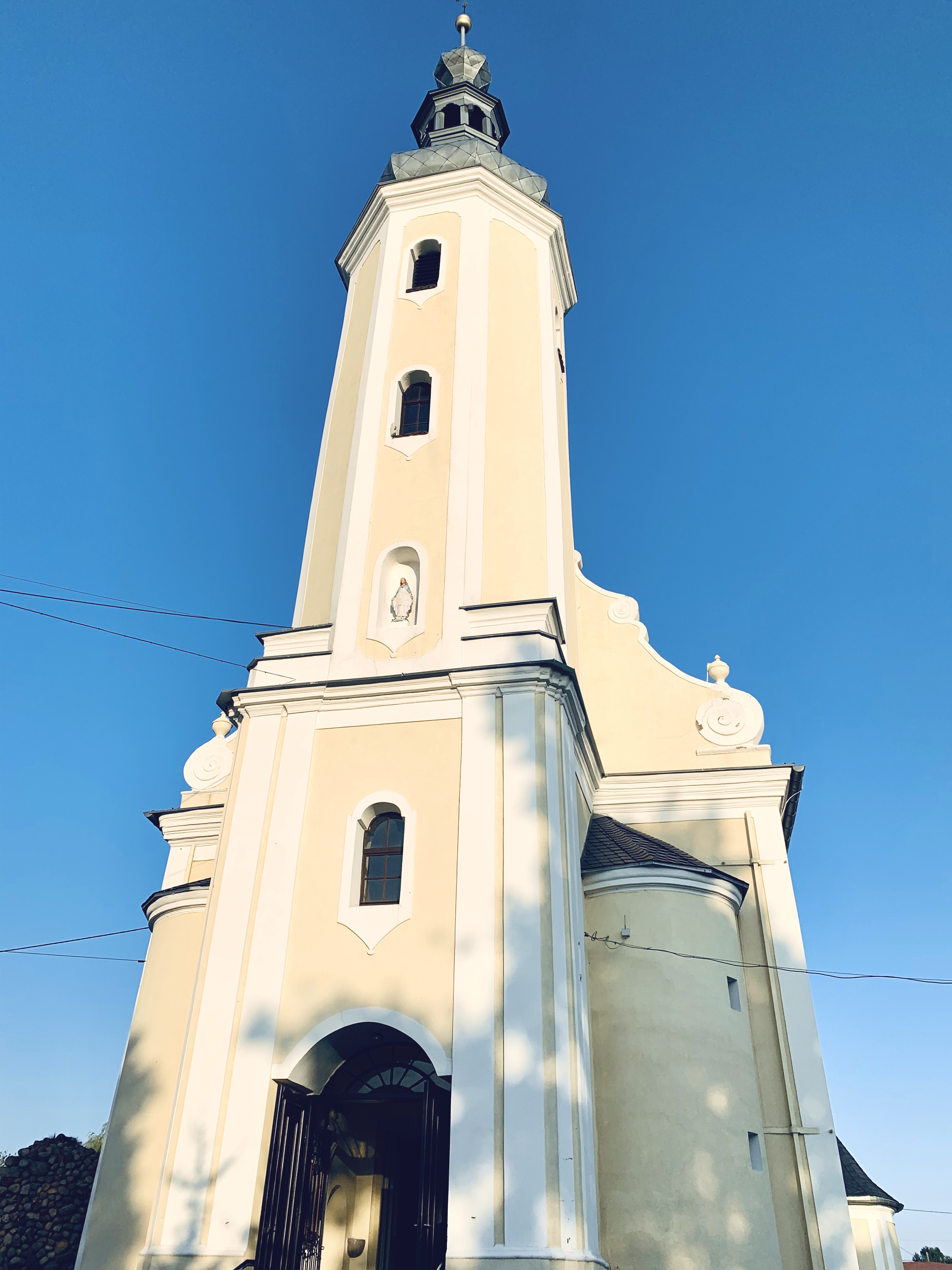
Baroque Church of the Assumption

Residents of the town of Kazimierz were mostly farmers. Some were craftsmen or tradesmen. The town did not have many inhabitants and it was not fortified. In March 1428, the Hussites burnt down almost the entire town, leaving it in ruins. Around the year 1430, Kazimierz lost its town privileges.

Until 1532 it was part of the Piast-ruled Duchy of Opole and Racibórz formed as a result of the medieval fragmentation of Poland into smaller duchies. Afterwards, it was integrated into the Bohemian Crown and Habsburg Empire, administratively becoming part of Głogówek County (circulus superioris Glogoviae) until 1742, and returning to Polish rule under the House of Vasa from 1645 to 1666. After the First Silesian War, it was annexed by the Kingdom of Prussia was incorporated into Prudnik County (Großkreis Neustadt). The Geographical Dictionary of the Kingdom of Poland from 1882 noted the local farm as one of the most outstanding farms in Silesia.

According to the 1 December 1910 census, among 462 inhabitants of Kazimierz, 427 spoke German, 18 spoke Polish, and 17 were bilingual. After the First World War, a monument dedicated to people from Kazimierz who died in the war, was erected in the village.

Three Polish citizens were murdered by Nazi Germany in the village during World War II.

== Bibliography ==
- Maler, Katarzyna (2017). Kościół katolicki na ziemi głubczyckiej w latach 1742–1945. Opole: Stowarzyszenie LGT "Płaskowyż Dobrej Ziemi".
