= Damasko, Opole Voivodeship =

Damasko
- Village
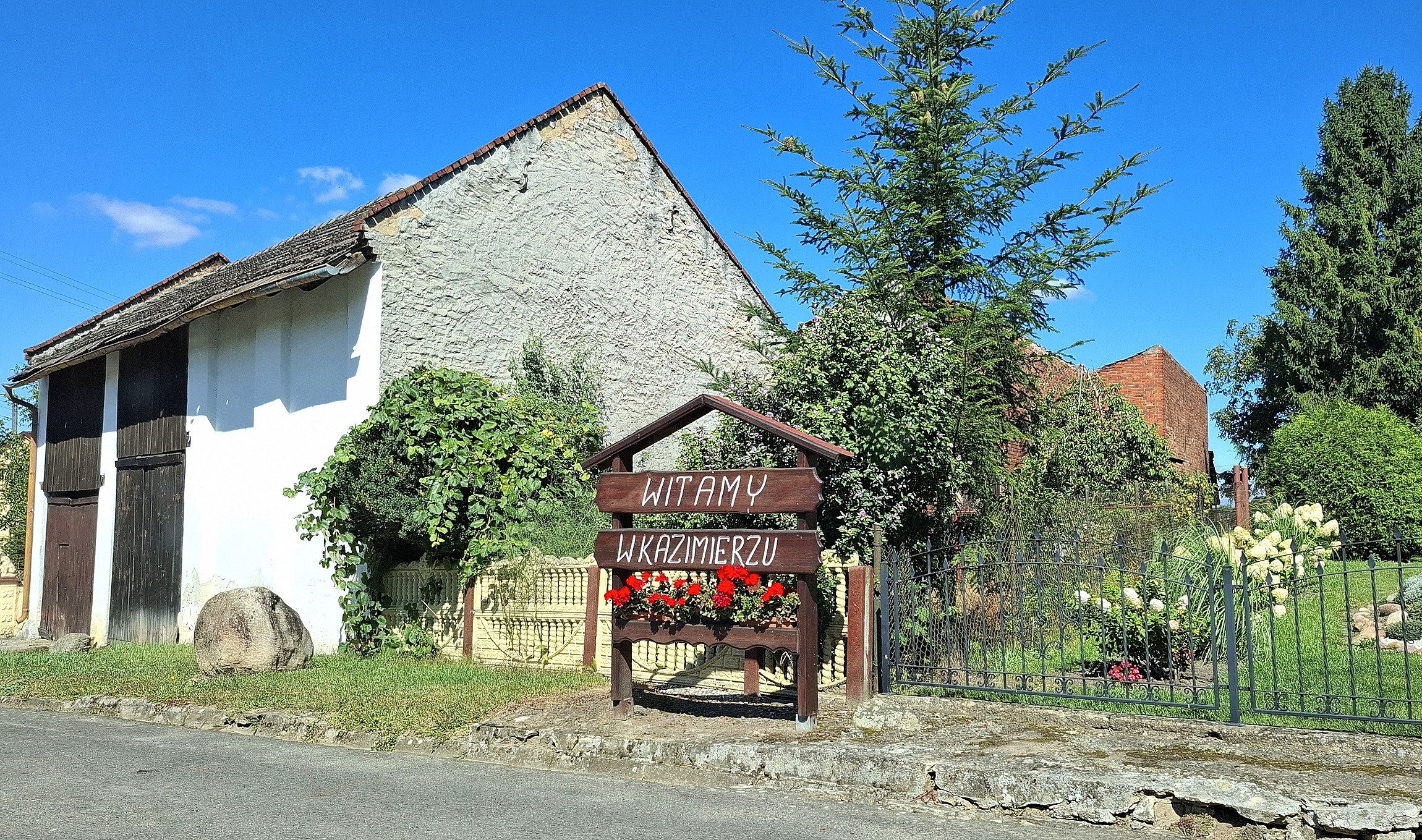

- Location within Poland
- Coordinates: 50°17′42″N 17°54′03″E
- Country: Poland
- Voivodeship: Opole
- County: Prudnik
- Gmina: Głogówek
- Established: 1137
- Time zone: UTC+1 (CET)
  - Summer (DST): UTC+2
- Postal code: 48-250
- Area code: +4877
- Vehicle registration: OPR

Damasko is a village in the administrative district of Gmina Głogówek, within Prudnik County, Opole Voivodeship, in southern Poland. It is situated in the historical region of Prudnik Land.

== Geography ==
The village is located in the southern part of Opole Voivodeship, close to the Czech Republic–Poland border. It is situated in the historical Prudnik Land region, as well as in Upper Silesia. It lies in the Silesian Lowlands, in the valley of Stradunia river. The National Register of Geographical Names for 2025 classified Damasko as a part (część wsi) of Kazimierz.

== History ==
The village of Damasko was established following the Peace of Kłodzko on 30 May 1137, which introduced a new border between Poland and Bohemia. The new border divided the village of Kazimierz between the two countries. The Bohemian part was named Damasko, separated from the Polish village of Kazimierz by Stradunia river. The village was an important economic centre. Despite the border being abolished in the 16th century, the division into Kazimierz and Damasko has survived. The Silesian noble family of Damasko came from the village.

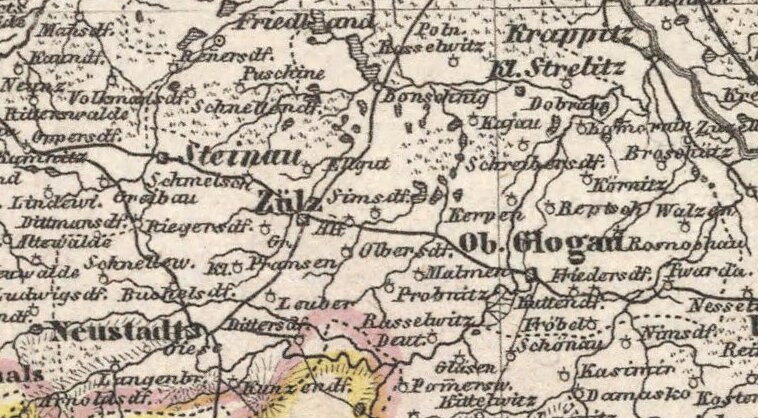
Damasko among other localities of Prudnik Land on an 1849 map

Until 1742, the village was a part of Głogówek County (circulus superioris Glogoviae) in the Bohemian Crown and Habsburg Empire, and under Polish rule of the House of Vasa from 1645 to 1666. After the First Silesian War, it was annexed by the Kingdom of Prussia was incorporated into Prudnik County (Großkreis Neustadt). In 1783, there was a school, a folwark, and a church in Damasko. The village had 224 inhabitants, with 25 of them being gardeners and 15 being farmers.

Until the 1810 secularization, Damasko was owned by the Cistercian order, unlike Kazimierz. Next, it was owned by the von Prittwitz family. In 1843, there were 76 houses in Damasko, with 565 people living in them. The village had 619 inhabitants in 1855, and 662 in 1861. The village had its own sigil. In the 19th century, there was a watermill in Damasko.
