= Jacob Epstein (art collector) =

Art collector (1864–1945)

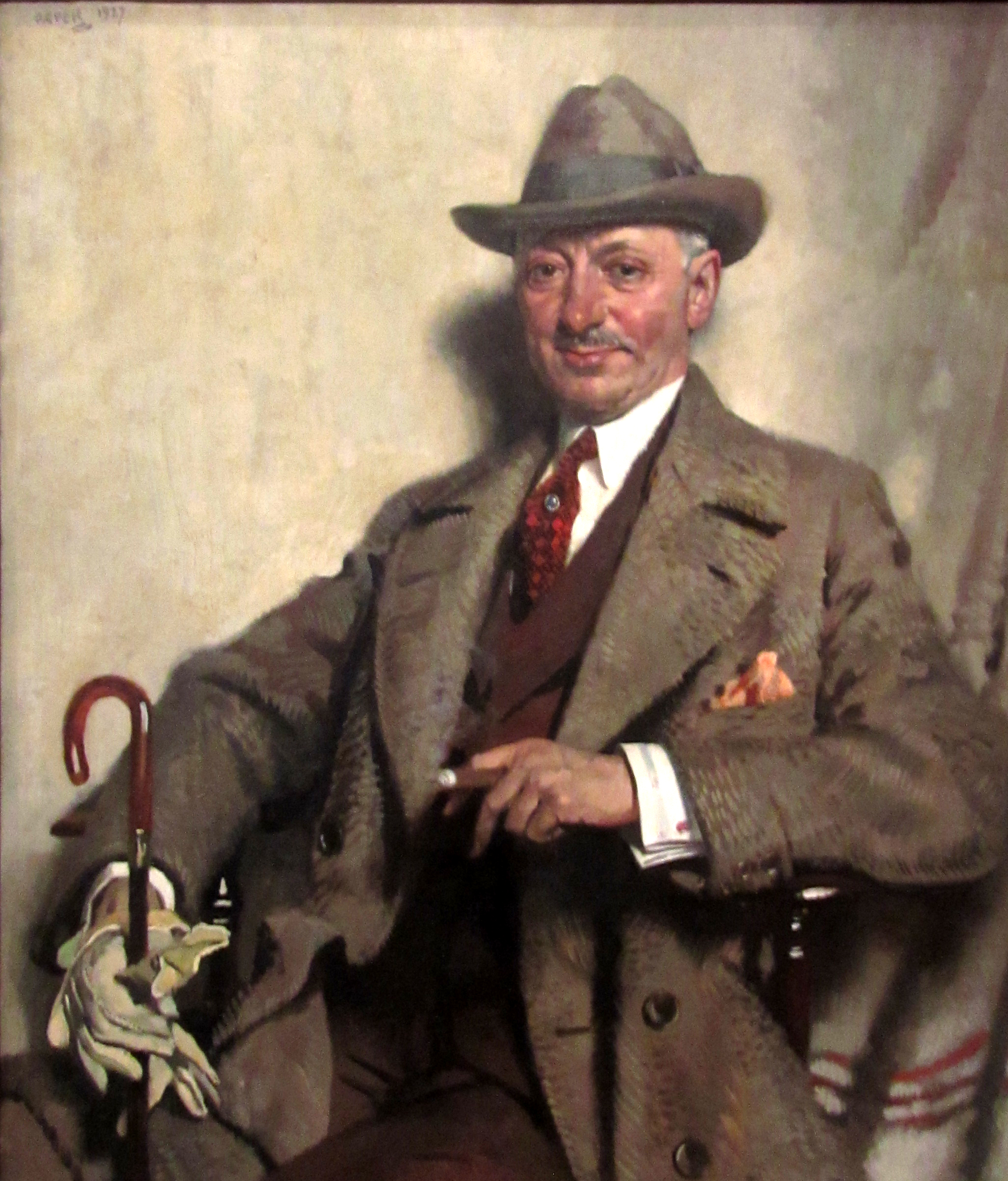
Portrait of Epstein by Sir William Orpen, 1927

Jacob Epstein (December 28, 1864 – December 27, 1945) was a Lithuanian-born Jewish-American merchant, philanthropist, and art collector from Baltimore, Maryland.

== Business ventures ==
Epstein was born on December 28, 1864, in Tauragė, Russian Empire, the son of Isaac and Jennie Epstein. He immigrated to the United States in 1881.

Epstein moved to Baltimore, Maryland, when he was seventeen. In 1881, he started a wholesale notion business on Barre Street. He began with a single building 18 by 30 feet, but as his business increased he bought more and more buildings, including entire blocks. He became the founder and proprietor of the Baltimore Bargain House, which by 1910 closed at $13,000,000 in sales and employed nearly 12,000 people (including 200 bookkeepers, accountants and stenographers). The House's weekly payroll was the second highest in Baltimore, only exceeded by the Baltimore and Ohio Railroad Company. He chartered a number of steamers from the Merchants and Miners Transportation Company and paid for merchants from Florida and Georgia to visit the Baltimore wholesale markets and convince Southern merchants of the advantages Baltimore had as a wholesale market. His firm later became the American Wholesale Corporation, which he became president of in upon its incorporation in 1919. He sold the firm's interest to the Butler Brothers in 1929. He was also president of American General Corporation and Ethmar Realty Co. as well as vice-president of the Industrial Corporation of Baltimore.

== Philanthropy ==
Epstein's success as a merchant led him to philanthropies and art collection at a large scale. He donated a building to the Eudowood Tuberculosis Sanatorium in 1905, founded and built the Mt. Pleasant Sanatorium for the tubercular in 1907, and donated the building and grounds for the Hebrew Home for Incurables in 1921. He was a member of the board of supervisors of the Baltimore City Charities and the Improvement Commission of Baltimore. In 1930, he donated a bronze cast of Rodin's The Thinker to the Baltimore Museum of Art, which he was a trustee of. His private art collection, which he loaned for special exhibitions in America and Europe, included works from Van Dyck, Gainsborough, Hals, Holbein, Rembrandt, Reynolds, and Titian. He was vice-president of the Merchant's Hotel Company and a director of the Hebrew Benevolent Society, the Hebrew Friendly Inn and Aged Home, Children's Sheltering and Protective Association, the National Howard Bank, the Merchants' and Manufacturers' Association, and the Clothier's Board of Trade.

== Personal life and death ==
Epstein attended Temple Oheb Shalom. He was married to Lena Weinberg. Their children were Ethel (wife of A. Ray Katz) and Marian (wife of Sidney Lansburgh).

Epstein died at the Hotel Mayflower in Palm Beach, Florida, on December 27, 1945, the day before his 81st birthday. Governor Herbert O'Conor, United States Senators Millard Tydings and George L. P. Radcliffe, and various state and city officials were among those who attended his funeral at the crowded Eutaw Place Temple. Rabbi Abraham D. Shaw conducted the funeral service. He was buried in the family mausoleum in Oheb Shalom Cemetery.
