= Kazys Tallat-Kelpša =

Lithuanian brigadier general

Brigadier general Kazys Tallat-Kelpša
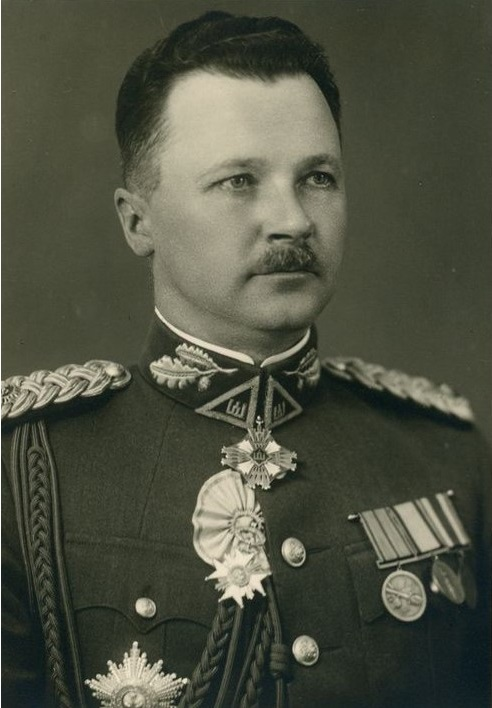
- Kelpša photographed with uniform of the Brigadier General of the Lithuanian Army and state awards
- Born: 28 October 1893; Padievytis Manor, Laukuva County, Russian Empire
- Died: 22 February 1968 (aged 74); Cleveland, United States
- Burial place: Cleveland's All Saints Cemetery
- Education: Kaunas School of Commerce (1914), Royal Military Academy of Belgium (1926)
- Military career
- Allegiance: Imperial Russian Army (1914–1918); Lithuanian Armed Forces (1919–1940)
- Service years: 1914–1940
- Rank: Brigadier general
- Awards: Medal of Independence of Lithuania (1928); Commander's Cross of the Order of the Lithuanian Grand Duke Gediminas (1928); Commander's Cross of the Order of Vytautas the Great (1937)
- Other work: Lecturer of the War School of Kaunas and Higher Officers' Courses

Kazys Tallat-Kelpša (28 October 1893 – 22 February 1968) was a Lithuanian brigadier general, lecturer of the War School of Kaunas and Higher Officers' Courses, Chief of Cavalry of the Lithuanian Armed Forces.

== Personal life ==
Kelpša had sister Ona Tallat–Kelpšaitė Jurskienė, who married with lieutenant colonel Alfonsas Jurskis.

Kelpša married Janina Daugulytė, who gave birth to his only son Algis. His son graduated from the higher school in Cleveland and was Reserve Captain of the United States Army.

== Early life ==
In 1914, Kelpša graduated from the Kaunas School of Commerce. Following the start of the World War I, he joined the Imperial Russian Army as a volunteer in 1914.

In 1918, in the wake of the February Revolution in Russia, its army was demobilized. Consequently, lieutenant Kelpša was released into the reserve.

== Interwar Lithuania ==
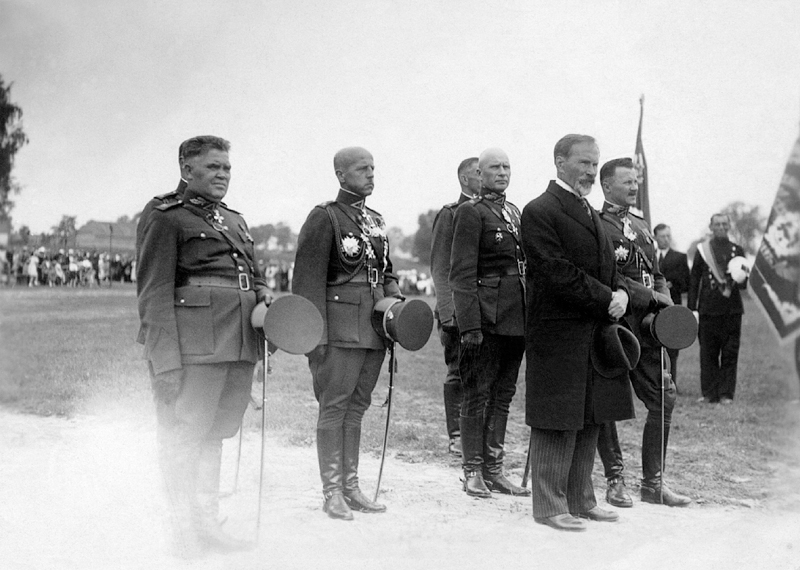
President Antanas Smetona at the Tauragė Manor in a ceremony during which a flag was handed over for the 3rd Dragoons Regiment of Iron Wolf in 1937. From the left: Minister of the Interior Julius Čaplikas, Commander of the Armed Forces Stasys Raštikis, Minister of National Defense Stasys Dirmantas, Antanas Smetona, and Brigadier General Kazys Tallat-Kelpša.

In October 1918, Kelpša reached Vilnius. In Vilnius, in the Council of Lithuania, he registered in the lists of the officers, and was released home before being summoned. Then he returned to his mother in Padievytis. After resting for a couple of weeks and without receiving any summons, he went to Vilnius again and registered once again, this time in the newly established Ministry of National Defence of Lithuania. Following it, he has been ordered to go to his homeland and gather volunteers for the recovering Lithuanian Armed Forces. It was stated that in the next couple days the headquarters of the National Defense District would be established in Tauragė, to which he had to introduce himself.

As the time passed and the Soviet Russia invaded the depths of Lithuania, occupied Šiauliai – the connection with Vilnius was lost. The volunteers in groups went towards Vilnius. Finally, in the beginning of January 1919, the said military headquarters arrived to Tauragė and Kelpša introduced himself there.

As the core of the Lithuanian cavalry was organized in Kaunas, Kelpša was sent to Kaunas. After reaching Kaunas and presenting himself to the military leadership, he was assigned to the 2nd Cavalry Squadron attached to the Separate Battalion, which later became the 5th Infantry Regiment.

On 20 March 1919, Kelpša was transferred to the Headquarters of the Ministry of National Defence of Lithuania and was soon sent to France as a member of the Lithuanian Military Mission to the Paris Peace Conference.

On 27 January 1920, Kelpša was appointed a military representative in Latvia and Estonia. On 19 September 1920, he returned to Kaunas and was assigned to the 2nd Uhlan Regiment.

On 1 November 1923, Kelpša was sent to Belgium where in 1926 he graduated from the Royal Military Academy of Belgium. In 1927, he was appointed Chief of Staff of the First Military District.

In 1931, Kelpša was lecturer of the Higher Officers' Courses, in 1933 he was transferred to the War School of Kaunas.

Since 25 October 1934, Kelpša was Chief of Cavalry of the Lithuanian Armed Forces.

In 1936, Kelpša was awarded the military rank of brigadier general.

== Occupations and World War II ==
Following the Soviet occupation of Lithuania in June 1940, Kelpša was fired from the Lithuanian Armed Forces on 25 June 1940.

== Emigration ==
In 1944, Kelpša with his family departed to Germany, and from 1949 onward lived in Cleveland, United States. He worked in the sphere of railroads until 16 July 1961, when he retired.

In 1950, Kelpša established a branch of the Lithuanian Soldiers Veterans Union Ramovė in Cleveland and headed it.
