= Kazimierz (disambiguation) =

Kazimierz may refer to:

== People ==
- Casimir, English form of Polish Kazimierz, a given name (including a list of people with the name)
- Casimir III the Great / Kazimierz, king of Poland 1333 to 1370
- Kazimierz Raszewski, general of the Polish–Soviet War.

== Places ==
- Kazimierz, a former city, former quarter of Kraków, Poland
- Kazimierz Dolny, in Puławy County, Lublin Voivodeship (eastern Poland)
- Kazimierz Landscape Park, a protected area around Kazimierz Dolny
- Kazimierz Biskupi, in Konin County, Greater Poland Voivodeship (west-central Poland)
- Kazimierz, Pabianice County in Łódź Voivodeship (central Poland)
- Kazimierz, Gmina Skomlin, in Wieluń County, Łódź Voivodeship (central Poland)
- Kazimierz, Opole Voivodeship (southwestern Poland)
- Kazimierz, Pomeranian Voivodeship (northern Poland)
- Kazimierz, West Pomeranian Voivodeship (northwestern Poland)
