= Kazimiera =

Kazimiera is a feminine form of the Polish name Kazimierz or Lithuanian Kazimieras (both mean Casimir) and may refer to:

- Kazimiera Bujwidowa (1867–1932), Polish feminist and social activist
- Kazimiera Iłłakowiczówna (1892–1983), Polish poet, writer, playwright and translator
- Kazimiera Kymantaitė (1909–1999), Lithuanian actress
- Kazimiera Rykowska (1933–2012), Polish athlete specializing in discus throw
- Kazimiera Strolienė (born 1960), Lithuanian biathlete
- Kazimiera Szczuka (born 1966), Polish literary historian, literary critic and television personality
- Kazimiera Utrata (1932–2018), Polish actress
- Kazimiera Zawistowska (1870–1902), Polish poet and translator
- Kazimiera Żuławska (1883–1971), Polish Romanist, translator, mountaineer, and women's rights activist

== See also ==
- wikt:Appendix:Lithuanian given names
- wikt:Appendix:Polish given names
