= Meyers Orts- und Verkehrslexikon =

Meyers Orts- und Verkehrslexikon des Deutschen Reiches (English: Meyer's Local- and Traffic-Dictionary of the German Empire) was an exhaustive gazetteer of the German Reich, published in a total of six editions by the Bibliographisches Institut.

It provides a brief information about almost every place in the Reich, down to factories and clusters of houseswith detailed information on the municipalities in which the places' resident registration office and parish registers would be found.

The fifth edition of 1912, microfilmed for the Genealogical Society of Utah, has been digitized and published on the Internet in English translation as Meyers Gazetteer. The sixth and last edition appeared in 1935, and is also available online in German.
