= Kasimir de Weydlich =

Polish chess player

Casimir (Kasimir, Kazimierz) de Weydlich (4 August 1859 – 17 September 1913) was a Polish chess master.

Born into an aristocratic family in Skotyniany, near Kamenets Podolskiy, he began his chess career in the early 1880s. He tied for 5-6th at the 2nd Warsaw City Championship in 1883/84, but won an individual game against Józef Żabiński, the winner of the event. Then he took 16th at Leipzig 1894 (the 9th DSB Congress won by Siegbert Tarrasch), and won a mini-match against Jean Taubenhaus (2 : 0) at Warsaw 1898.

Count de Weydlich was a co-founder of the Lwowski Klub Szachistów (The Lemberg Chess Club) in Lwów (Lviv, Lemberg), Galicia (then Austria-Hungary), in November 1894. He played in several tournaments in Lemberg; took 3rd in 1895, shared 2nd in 1896 (both won by Ignatz von Popiel), took 4th in 1904 (Emil Gross won), and tied for 4-5th in 1912 (Oskar Piotrowski won).

His best achievement was the second prize at Le Monde Illustré correspondence tournament in 1897. He died in Lemberg in 1913.
