= Eugenijus Kazimieras Jovaiša =

Lithuanian fashion artist (born 1940)

Eugenijus Kazimieras Jovaiša (born 17 January 1940 in Rokiškis) is a Lithuanian artist and leatherworker.

== Life and works ==
In 1965, he graduated from the Estonian Academy of Arts, where he was a student of Adamson-Eric. In 1965–2004, he taught at the Kaunas Art School (which changed its name several times). He is a member of the Lithuanian Artists' Association.

He created monumental interiors from leather panels: Herbal pharmacy in Kaunas 1970, Kaunas City Map of Kaunas City Executive Committee (1978, now Kaunas city municipality), resting at home "Flax" in Palanga (36 screens), children's music school in Panevėžys (1988). and others.

Since 1991 he has been designing decorative leather panels for private interiors ("Verses" in 1993, "The Last Supper" in 1995, both in Kaunas, "Mindaugas Coronation", "Hunting," "Tree," "Sacrifice", all in 1998, "Fish," "Ostrich," both in 2000, all Florida United States).

Works characterized by stylized figurative expressions, plant, heraldic motifs, various reliefs. He used embossed, toned, burnt, and gilded leather in his techniques. Since 1968 he has been participating in exhibitions.
