= Tauragė =

- City
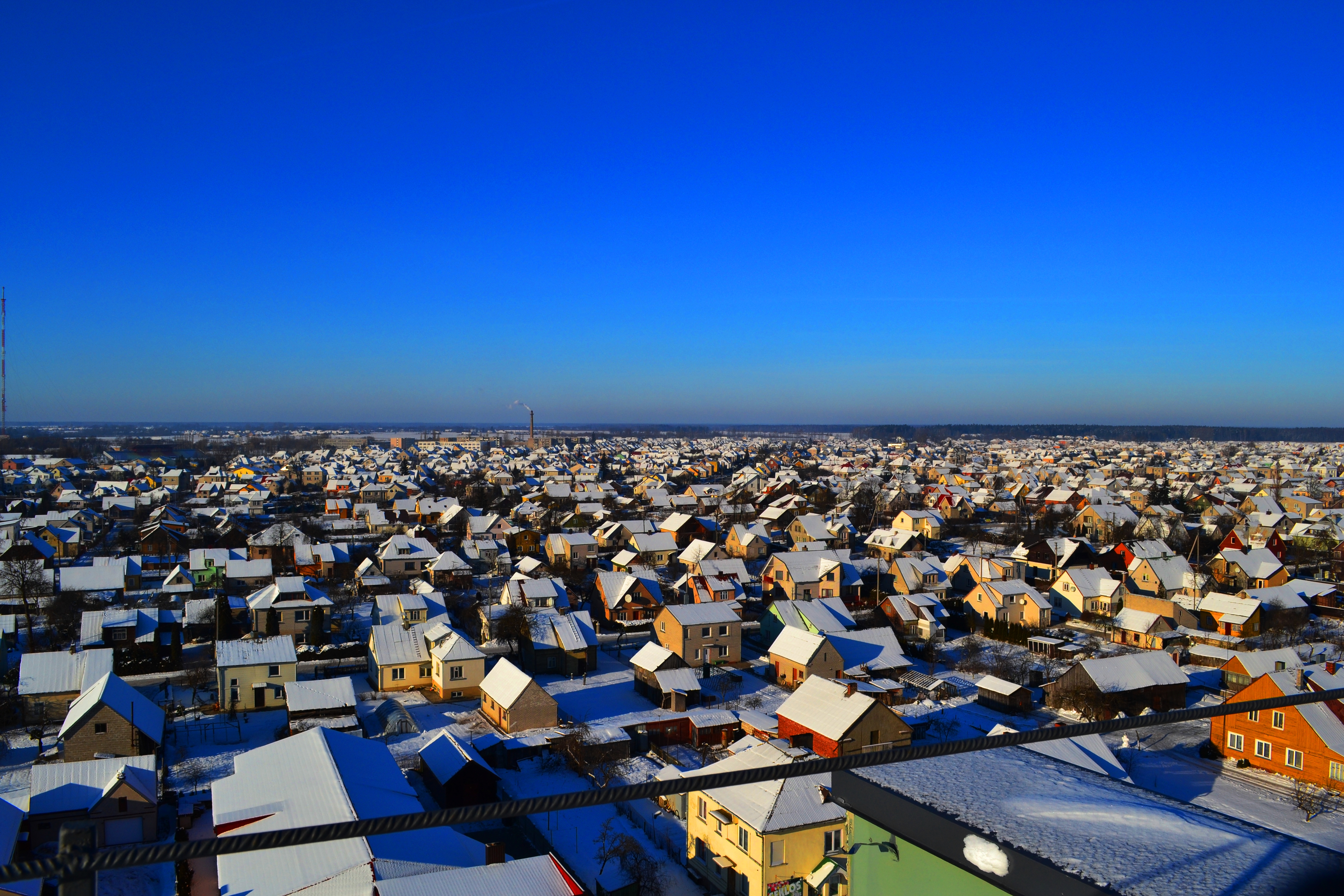
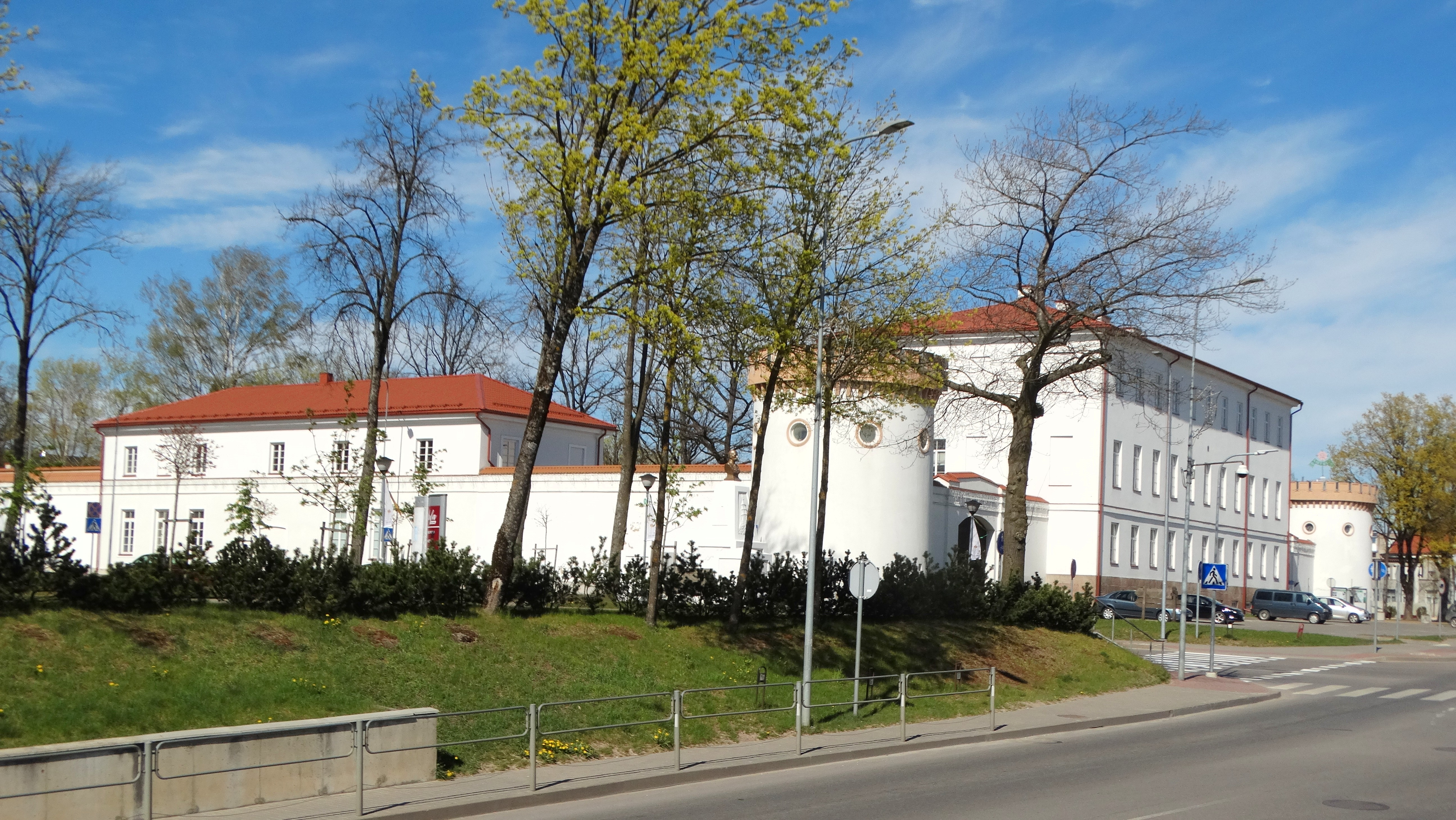
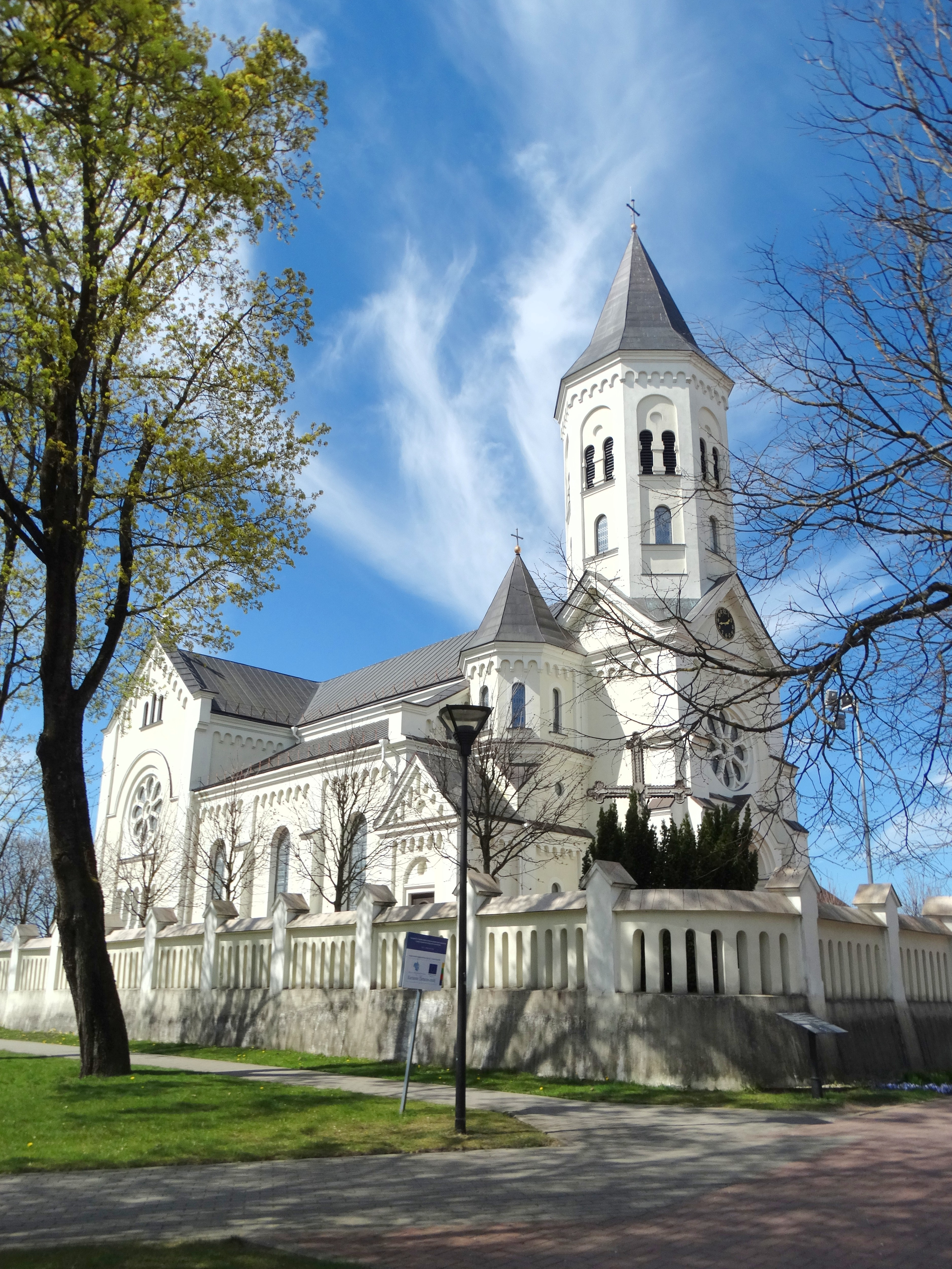
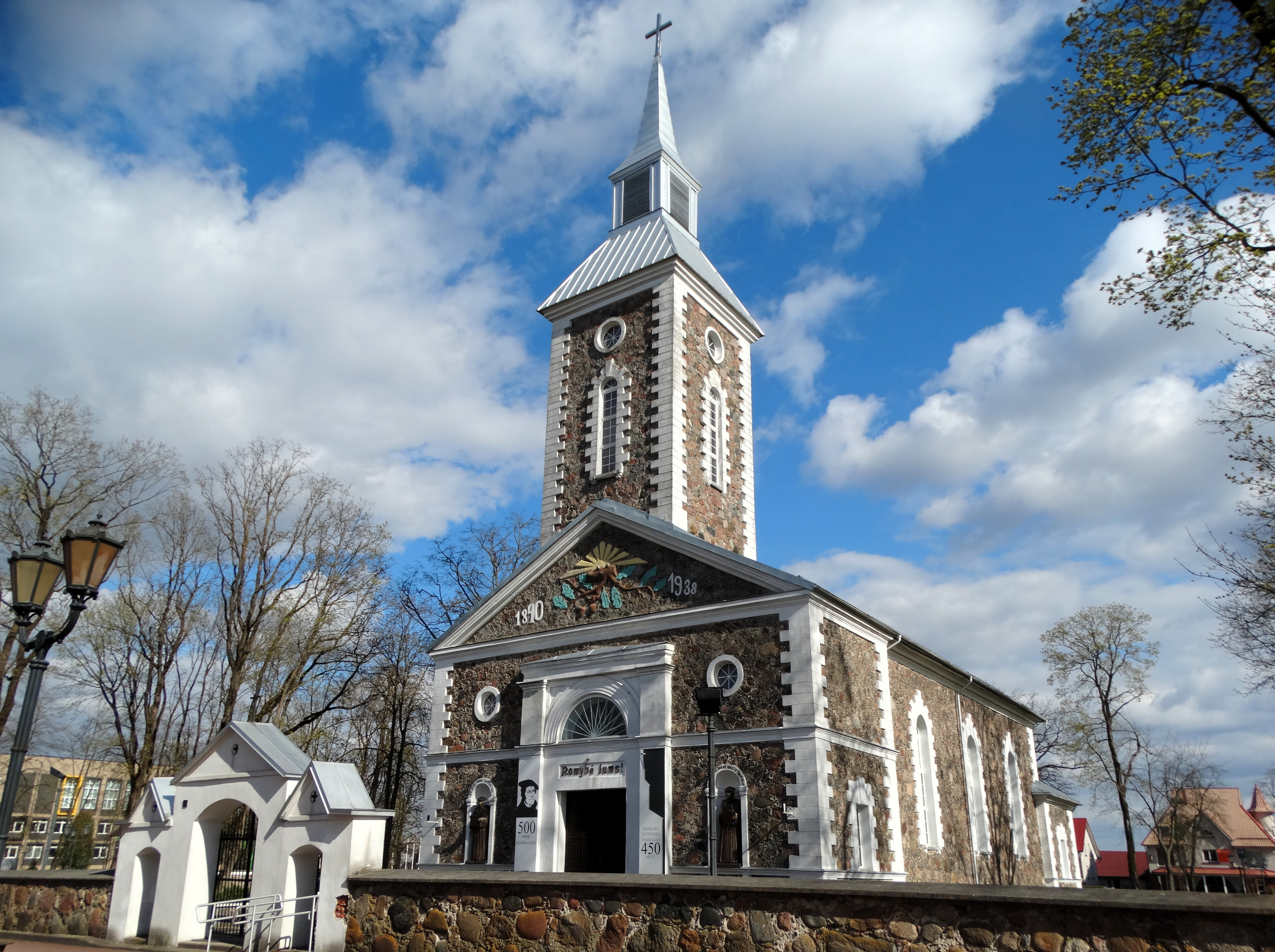
- Bird's eye view of Tauragė Tauragė Castle Church of the Holy Trinity Rebirth Square Evangelical Lutheran Church

- Flag Coat of arms Brandmark

- Location of Tauragė Tauragė (Europe)
- Coordinates: 55°15′08″N 22°17′23″E
- Country: Lithuania
- Ethnographic region: Samogitia
- County: Tauragė County
- Municipality: Tauragė district municipality
- Eldership: Tauragė town eldership
- Capital of: Tauragė County; Tauragė district municipality Tauragė town eldership Tauragė rural eldership
- First mentioned: 1507
- City status: 1924

Area
  - City: 14.1 km^{2} (5.4 sq mi)
- Elevation: 38 m (125 ft)

Population (2021)
  - City: 21,203
  - Density: 1,500/km^{2} (3,890/sq mi)
  - Metro: 38,002
- Demonym(s): Tauragian(s) (English), tauragiečiai or tauragiškiai (Lithuanian)
- Time zone: UTC+2 (EET)
  - Summer (DST): UTC+3 (EEST)
- Postal code: 72001
- Website: taurage.lt

Tauragė (see other names) is an industrial city in Lithuania, and the capital of Tauragė County. In 2020, its population was 20,956. Tauragė is situated on the Jūra River, close to the border with the Kaliningrad Oblast, and not far from the Baltic Sea coast.

Although first mentioned in 1507, Tauragė did not receive its city charter until 1924, and its coat of arms (a silver hunting horn in a red field) until 1997.

The previously small town was significantly developed in the 19th century and early 20th century, however its architecture suffered devastating damages during World War I and World War II. Notable surviving buildings in the city include the castle (19th century Russian Empire customs), 19th century Post office, buildings from the 20th century inter-war period, several churches: the Lutheran (built in 1843), the Catholic (1904) and Orthodox (1933). Lithuanian, Swedish and Danish factories operate in the city.

== Names and etymology ==
Tauragė is a conjunction of two Lithuanian words: tauras, which means "aurochs", and ragas which means "horn", hence the city's coat of arms. The city is known as Tauragie in Samogitian, as Tauroggen in German, Taurogi in Polish, Tovrig (טאווריג) in Yiddish, and Taurage (Таураге; historically Tauroggen [Таурогген] or Taurogi [Тауроги]) in Russian.

Historically, Tauragė has also been called Tavrik, Tavrogi, Tavrig, Tevrig, Taurik and Tarogen. It is called Tan Ragh on the 1539 Carta Marina.

== History ==
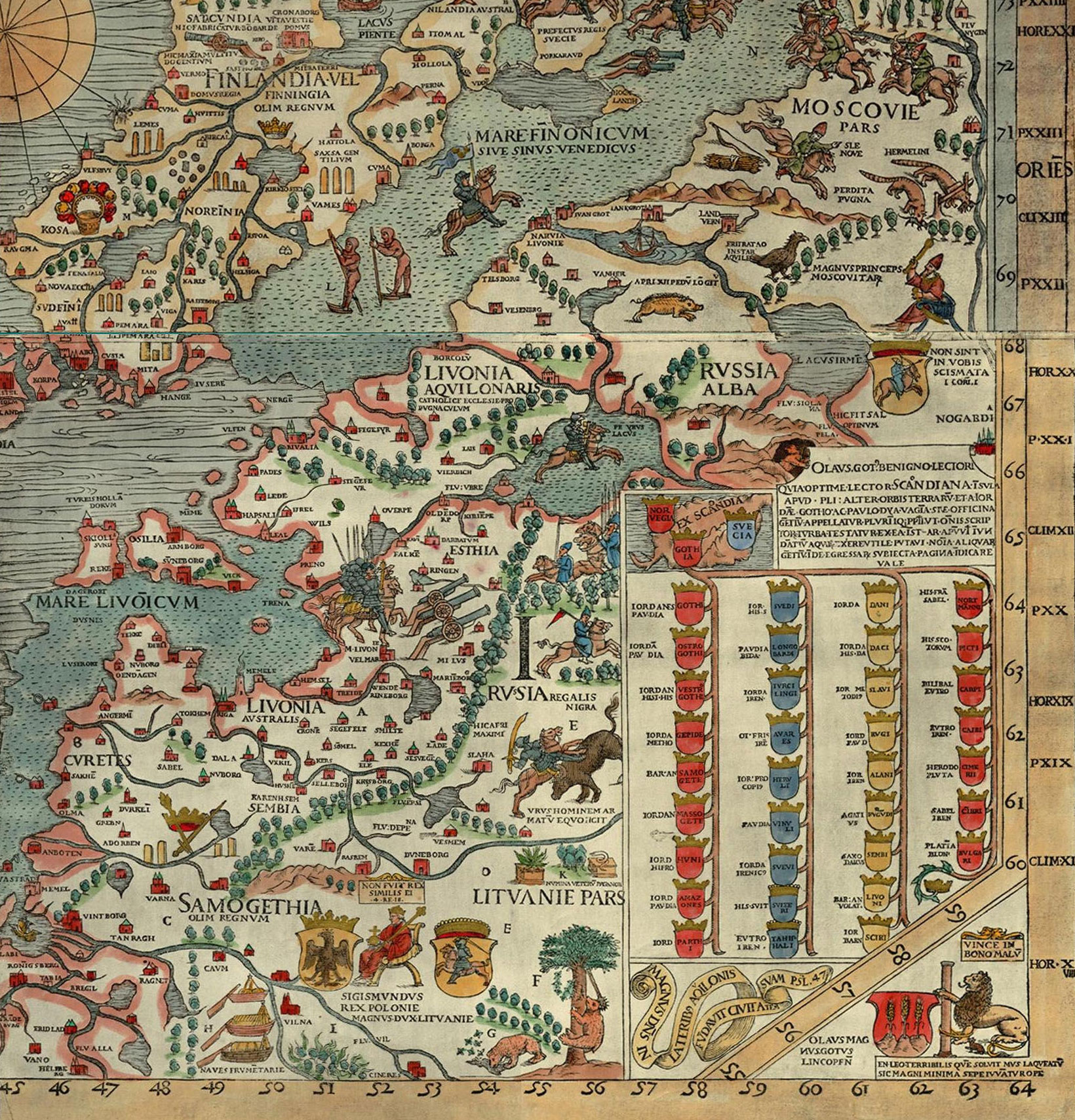
Tauragė mentioned as "Tan Ragh" in a map dated 1539

Tauragė is situated between two Baltic tribes and at the edge of two historical regions. In 13th c. donations written by Mindaugas, the king of Lithuania mentions that there are lands called Karšuva (Carsovia) and Skalva (Scalovia). On the eve of the Teutonic Order aggression, Skalva was situated southwest of the current town. It was inhabited by the Baltic tribe of Scalovians. To the northeast there was the region of Samogitia inhabited by Samogitians. Karšuva, the region which existed in these lands, was different because the peoples had the blood of the Curonians and Lamatians, two nearby Baltic tribes. By inhabiting the northern borders of Skalva, the Carsovians became close to the Scalovians. Even the origin of the name Karšuva (Carsovia) can be linked to the ethnonym Kuršiai (Curonians), which is written as Cori, Corres, Kauren in old historical sources.

When the war with the Teutonic Order broke out, ethnic and administrative borders started to change rapidly. It is possible that in the end of the 13th c. and the start of 14th c., when Skalva suffered heavy casualties, Samogitians, supported by the rulers of the Grand Duchy of Lithuania, tried to push to the southwest. But due to non-stopping attacks by the Teutonic Order in the 14th c. they had to retreat. Only in the 15-16th c. when the wars were over did Samogitians come back to their former lands. At that time northern parts of Skalva, which were left for Lithuania, was inhabited by Samogitians, because most of the Scalovians were killed or fled during the attacks of the Order.

First mentioned in 1507, the town has been a center of Lutheranism in Lithuania. Although it belonged to the Grand Duchy of Lithuania, there was a period when the land of Tauragė belonged to East Prussian rulers in economic terms. From 1691 until 1793, Tauragė belonged to Brandenburg-Prussia (the Kingdom of Prussia from 1701), after the marriage of Margrave Ludwig of Brandenburg to Princess Ludwika Karolina Radziwiłł. In 1793 it was ceded, along with Seirijai (Prussian Serrey), to Poland-Lithuania as "compensation" for the territories annexed in the Second Partition of Poland. In 1795, as with almost all of the Grand Duchy of Lithuania, the town became part of the Russian Empire in the Third Partition.

Tsar Alexander I of Russia, signed an armistice with Napoleon I in Tauragė on 21 June 1807, that was soon to be followed with the Treaties of Tilsit. On 30 December 1812, the Prussian General Yorck, signed the Convention of Tauroggen, declaring his troops neutral, that effectively ended the fragile Franco-Prussian alliance during the French invasion of Russia. In 1836, much of the city was destroyed by a fire. Honoré de Balzac stayed in Tauragė in 1843. During the January Uprising, Tauragė was the primary point of collection for weapons smuggled from Lithuania Minor to the insurgents in Samogitia.

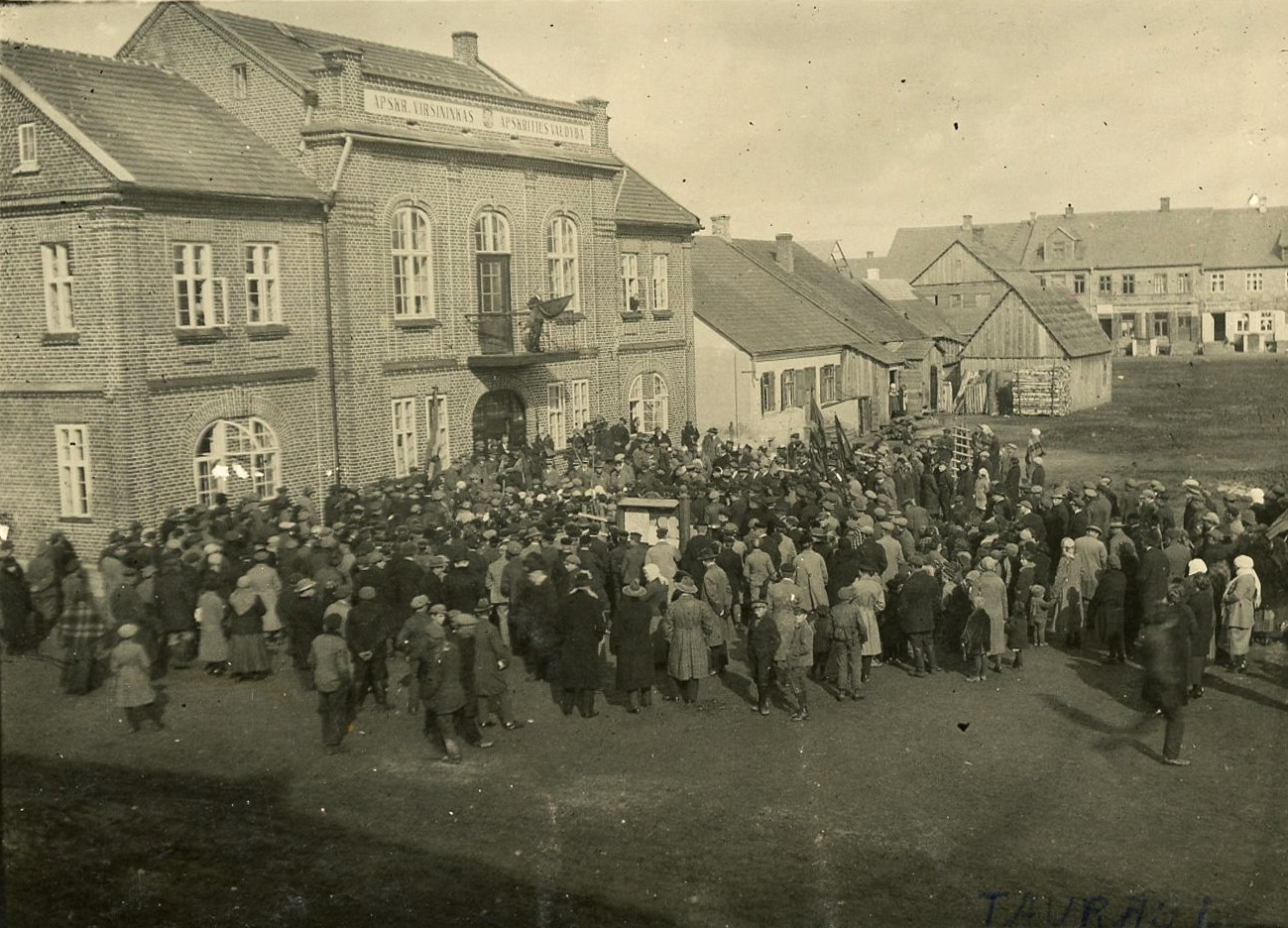
Celebration of the 10th anniversary of the restoration of Independence of Lithuania in Tauragė in 1928

In 1915, a significant part of the city's infrastructure was destroyed by German troops during World War I. During the independent Republic of Lithuania (1918-1940), the war destroyed town grew rapidly and new modern buildings, factories were built. On 9 September 1927, the rebellion against the authoritarian rule of President Antanas Smetona broke out in Tauragė, but the revolt was quickly suppressed.

During World War II, after the Soviet annexation of Lithuania in 1940, the Tauragė Castle was a place of imprisonment for Lithuanian political dissidents and POWs. Many local inhabitants, including the parents and relatives of Roman Abramovich, were exiled to Siberia during the Soviet occupation in 1940. This saved the family from the Holocaust. When Operation Barbarossa commenced on 22 June 1941, the Soviets retreated, and Tauragė was captured by the German Wehrmacht after heavy bombing on the same day. About 4,000 Jews were murdered in Tauragė and nearby villages (about 40% of Tauragė population). In the autumn of 1944, the German occupation ended and the Soviets replaced them with a renewed occupation lasting until 1990. During the Soviet occupation the town was rebuilt and grew very rapidly, although the pre-war old town architecture was not preserved. Even the old market square and one of the main streets, Kęstučio, had been completely destroyed and built over. Only some old buildings of the town centre have survived to this day.

== Demography ==
=== Population ===
According to the 2021 census, the city population was 21,203 people, of which:

- Lithuanians – 97.5% (20,672)
- Russians – 0.75% (159)
- Ukrainians – 0.20% (43)
- Poles – 0.08% (18)
- Belarusians – 0.08% (18)
- Others / did not specify – 1.41% (300)

== Sport ==
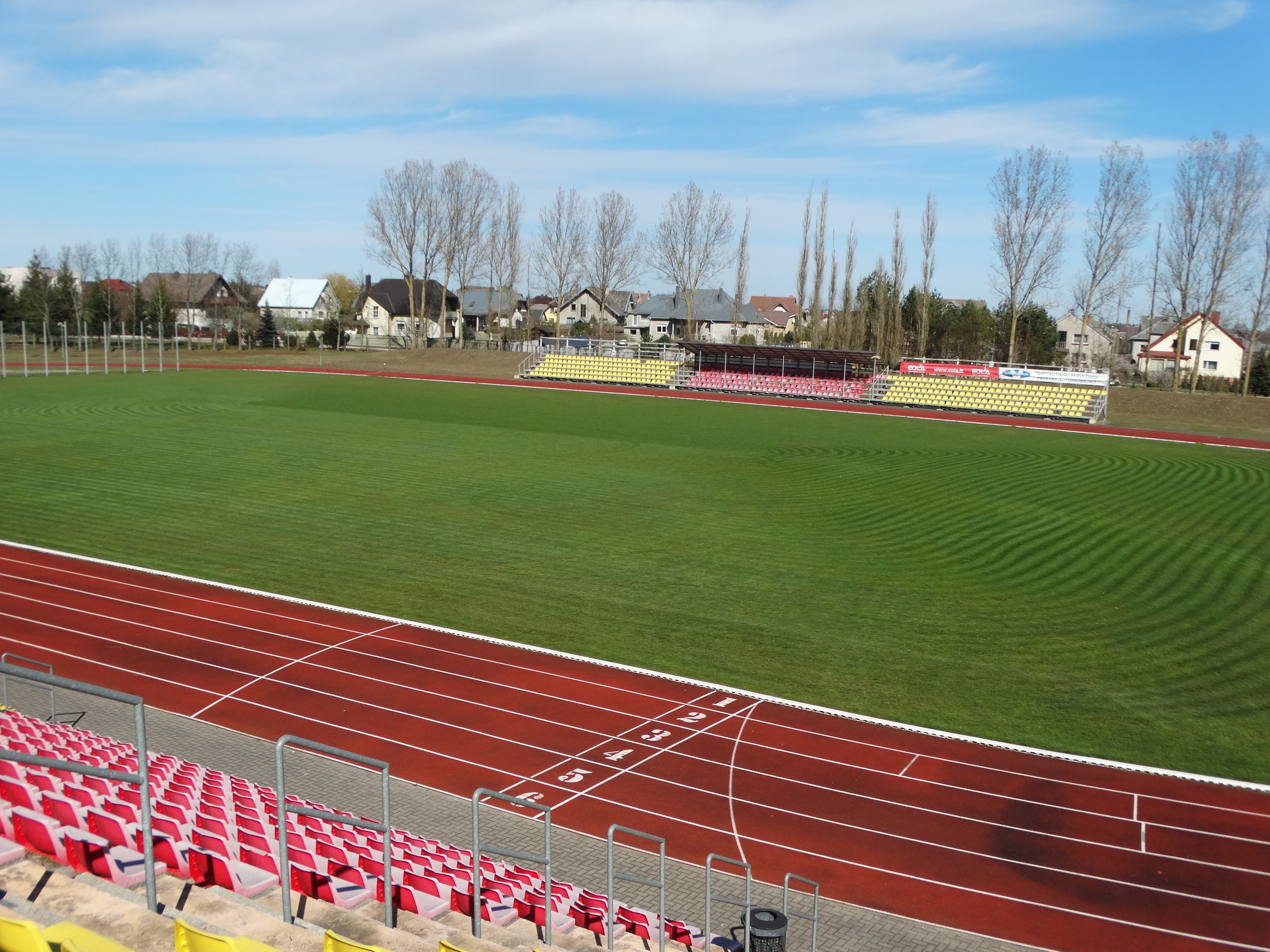
Vytautas Stadium

Tauragė is known for having one main football club FK Tauras Tauragė, which was founded in 1922.

== Notable people ==
- Reuven Barkat – Israeli politician, member of the Knesset.
- Mordechai Pogramansky Rabbi and community leader during WW2
- Mari Aldon - Lithuanian-American actress
- Ernestas Šetkus - Lithuanian footballer
- Rokas Baciuška - Lithuanian professional rally driver
- Jurgis Baltrušaitis - Poet
- Haim Fishel Epstein - Lithuanian-American rabbi
- Jacob Epstein - art collector
- Samuel Isaac Joseph Schereschewsky - Anglican Bishop of Shanghai, China
- Tauras Jogėla - Lithuanian basketball player
- Svajūnas Adomaitis - Lithuanian Greco-Roman wrestler
- Edgaras Venckaitis - Lithuanian wrestler
- Rokas Giedraitis - Lithuanian basketball player
- Remigijus Šimašius - Lithuanian politician and lawyer
- Solomon Levitan - American politician
- Nerija Putinaitė - Lithuanian philosopher and politician

== Twin towns – sister cities ==
Tauragė is twinned with:

- Bełchatów, Poland
- Bytów, Poland
- Ostróda, Poland
- Považská Bystrica, Slovakia
- Riedstadt, Germany
- Karlovac, Croatia
- Ternopil, Ukraine
- Lutsk, Ukraine
- (Georgia (country)) Zestaponi, Georgia

== Gallery ==
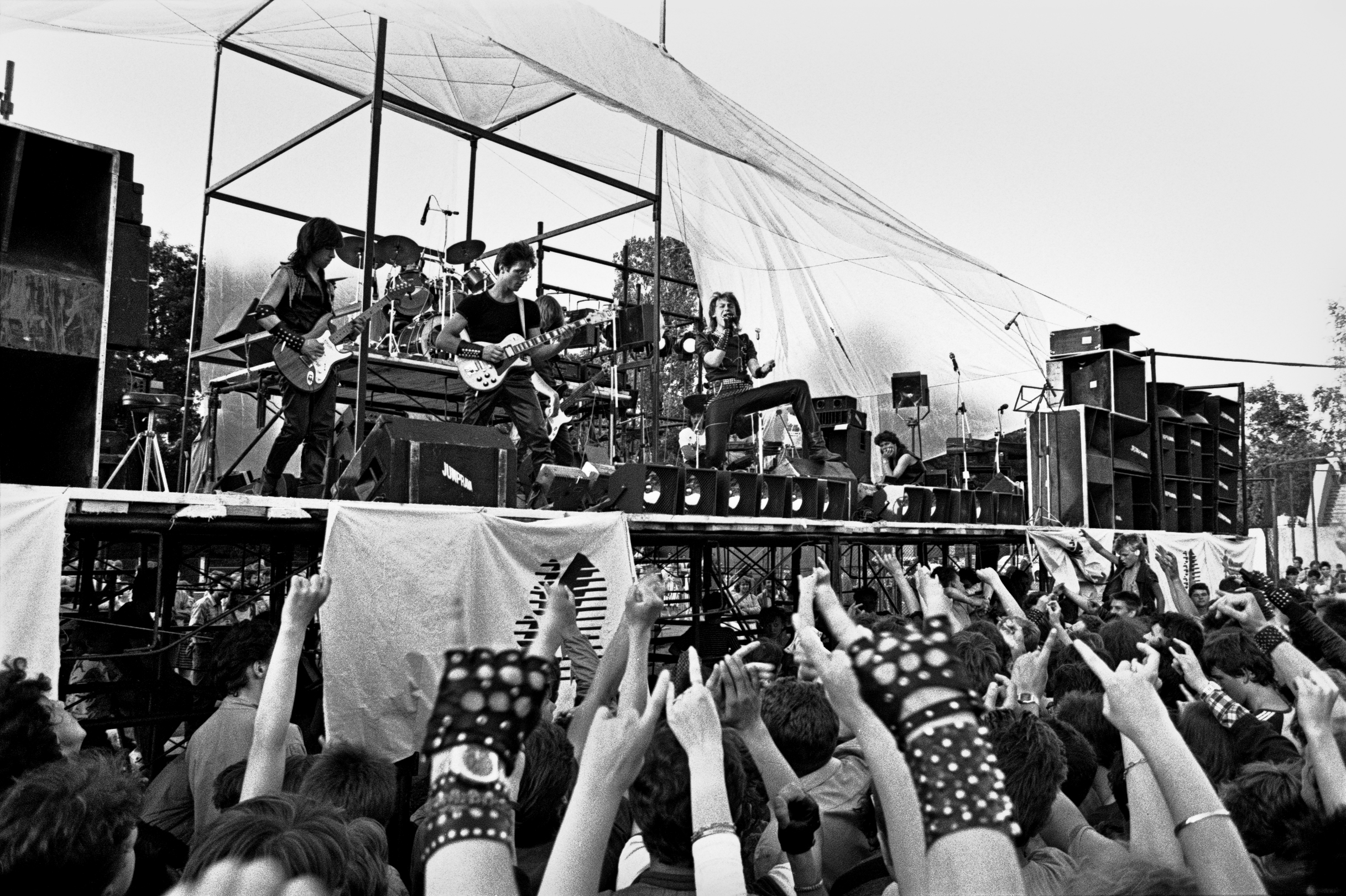
Roko Maršas in Tauragė, 1987

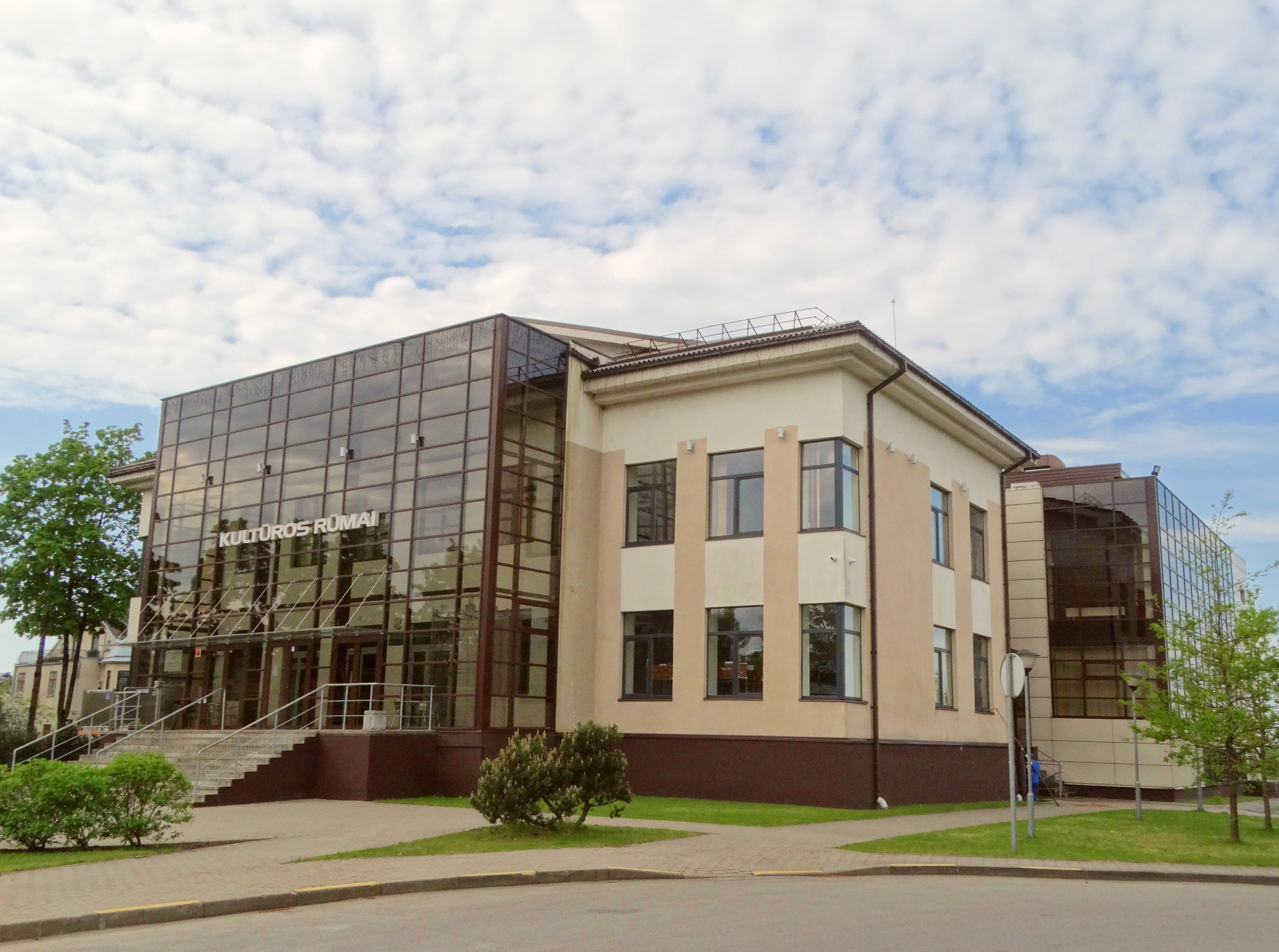
Taurage Palace of Culture

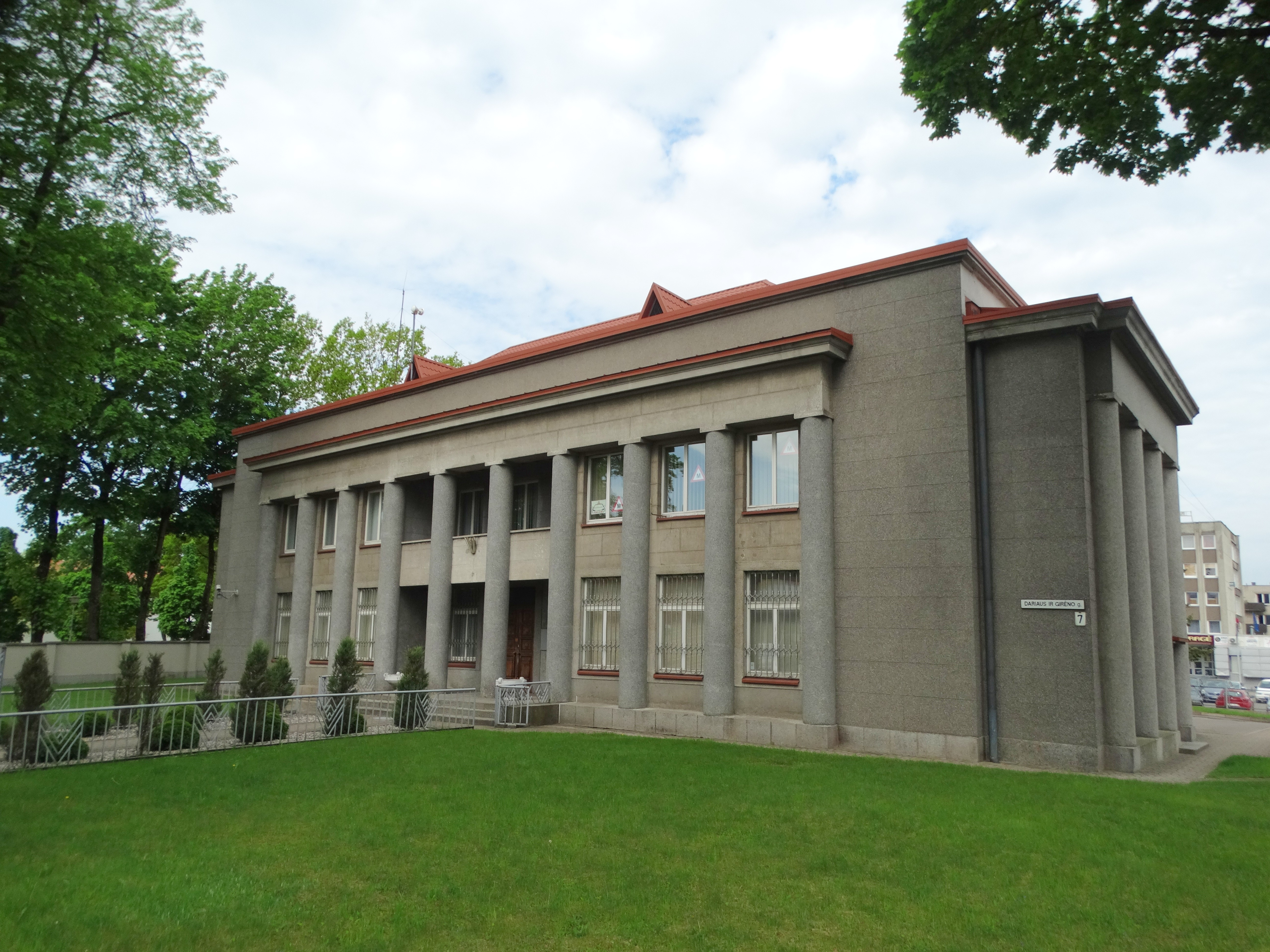
Historic bank building, built in 1936

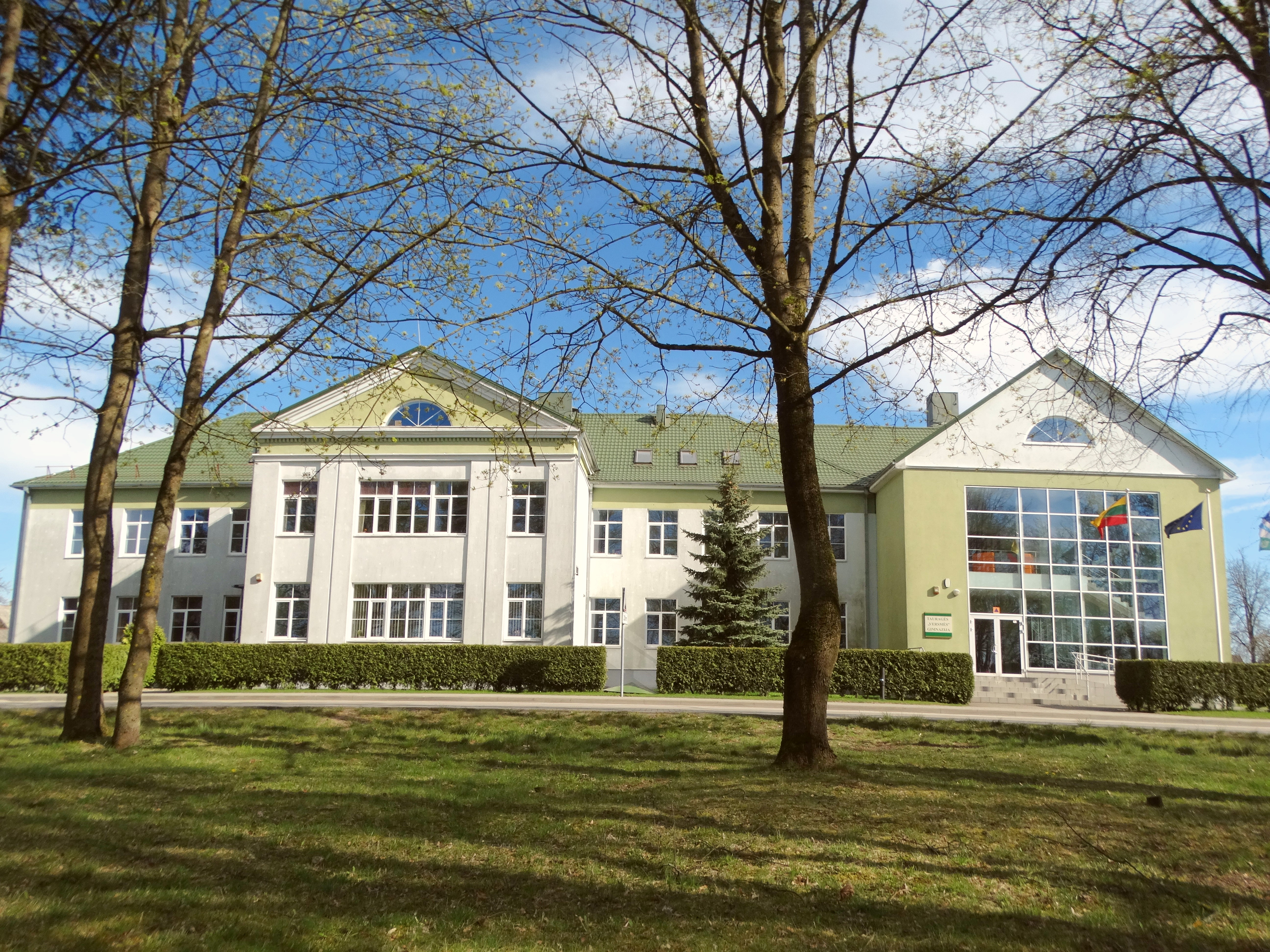
Versmė Gymnasium

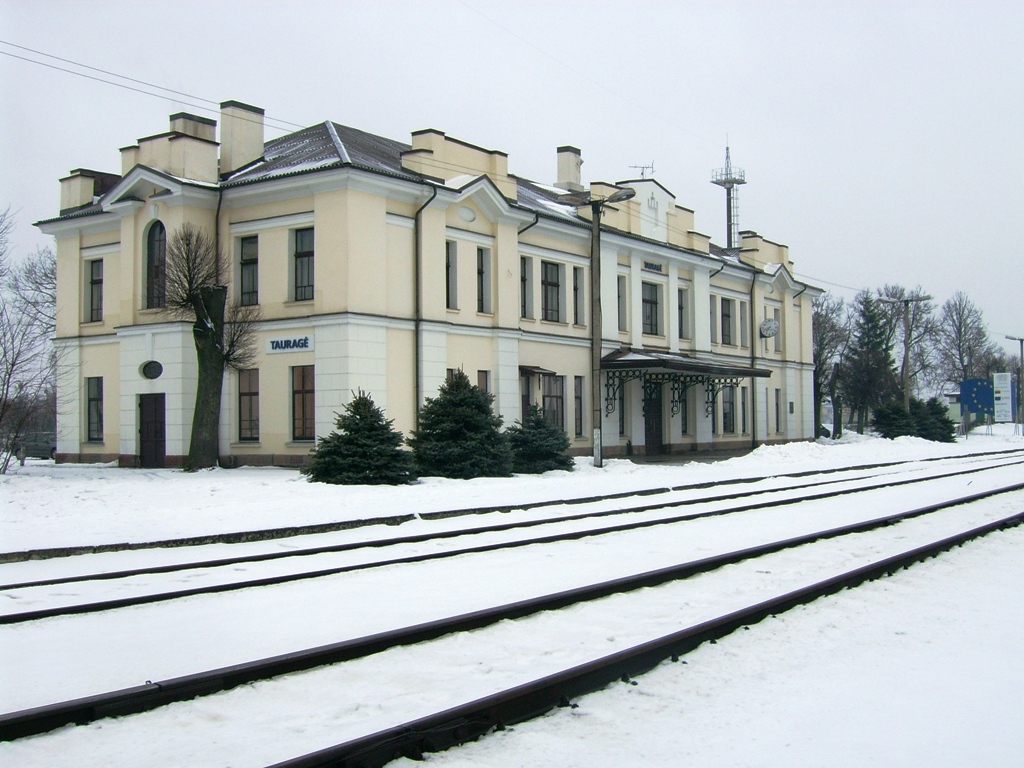
Railway station built in 1927

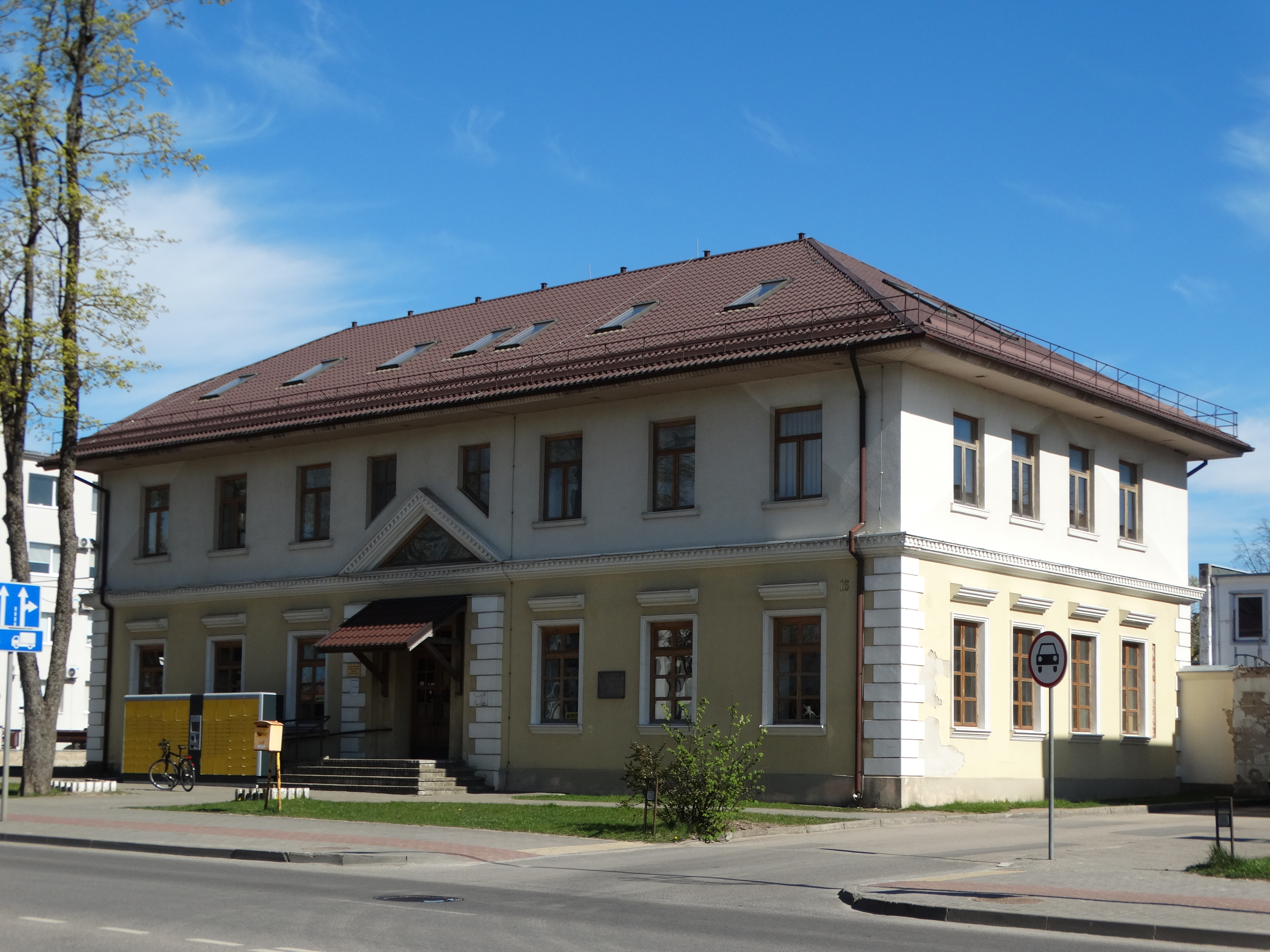
Post Office

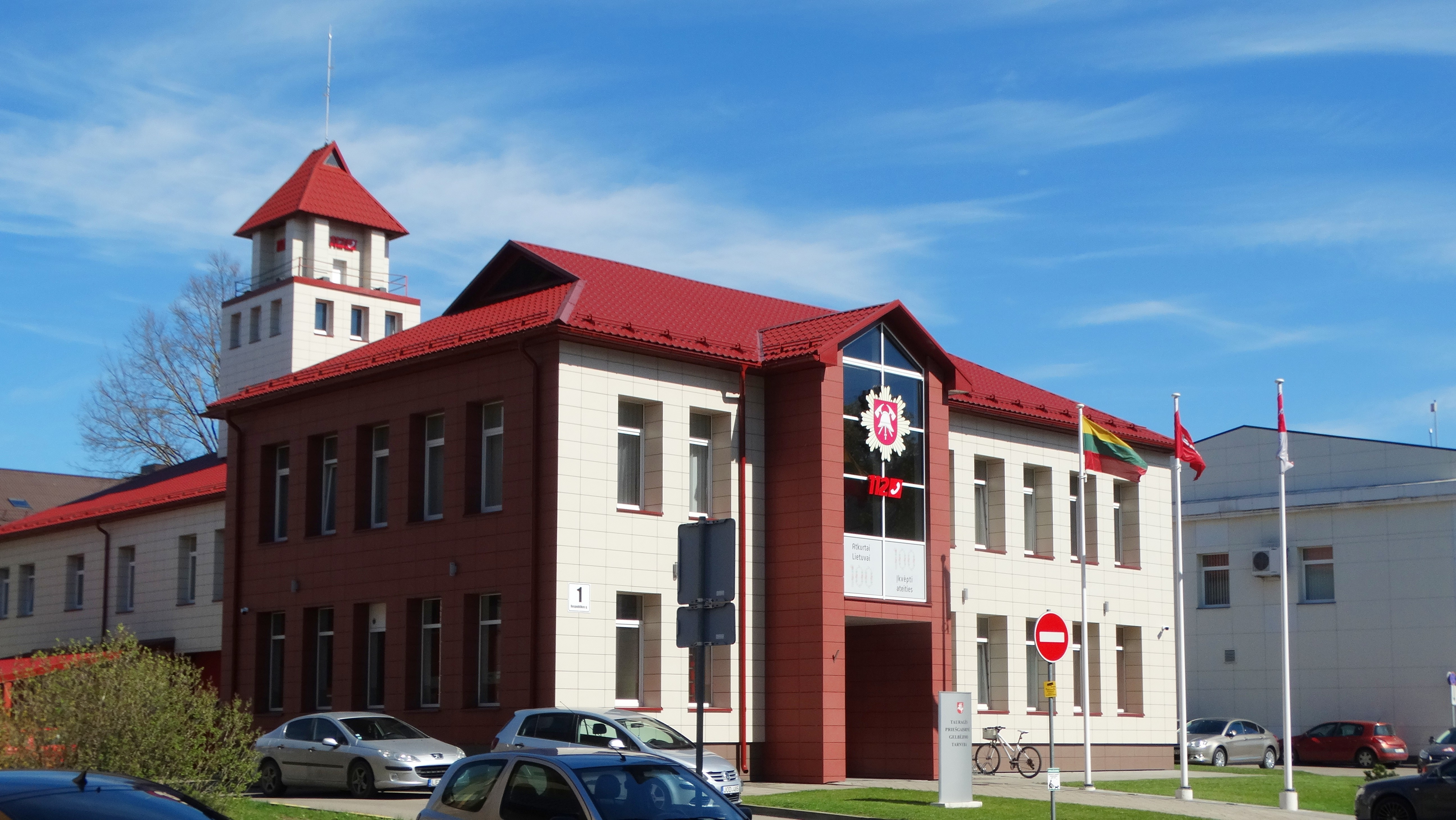
Fire station

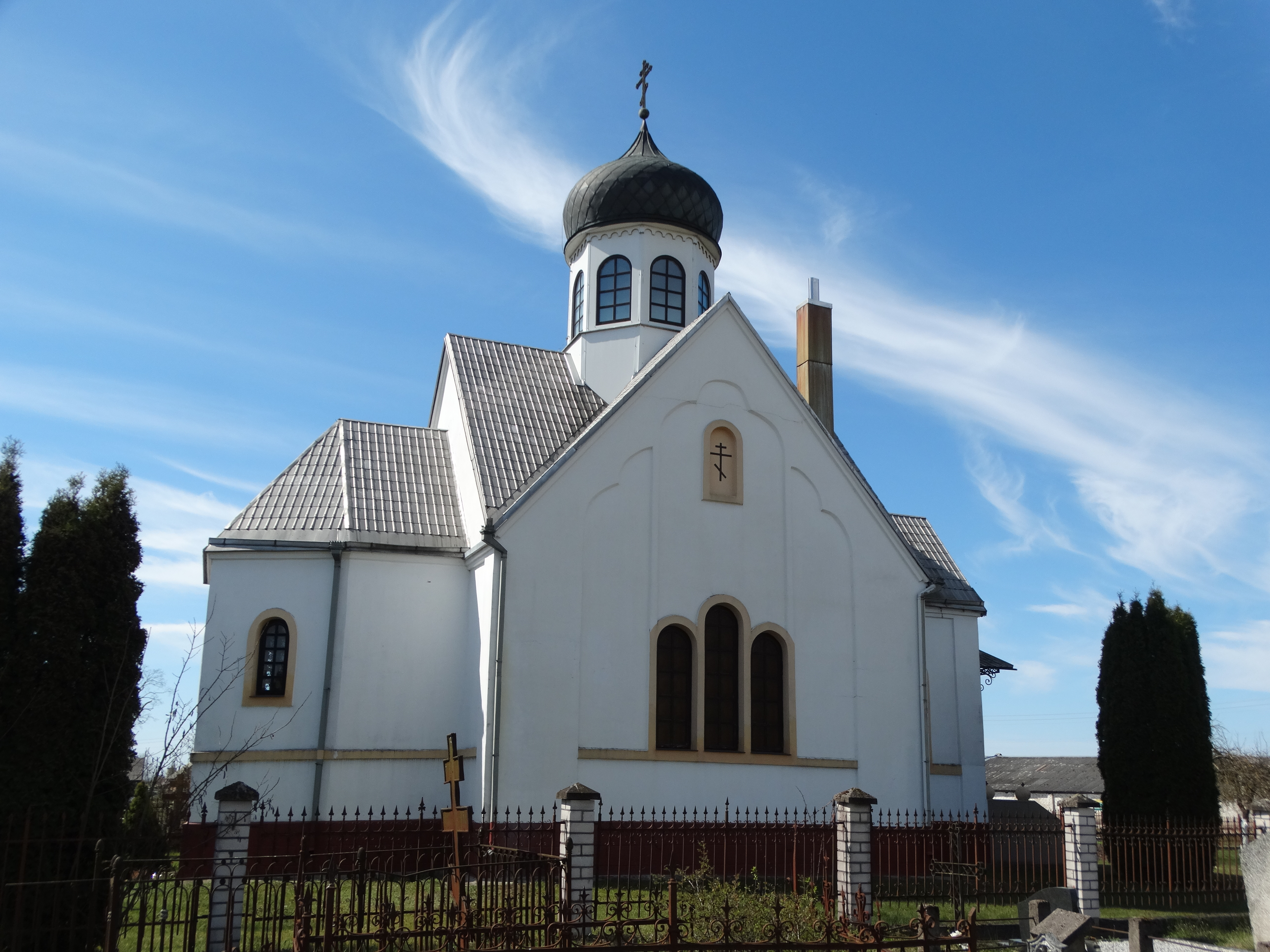
Orthodox Church of the Vilnius' Martyrs Anthony, John, and Eustathius
