= Kazys Uscila =

Kazys Uscila (born 13 May 1945 in Naručionys (now Elektrėnai Municipality), near to Vievis, Trakai district) is a Lithuanian journalist, translator of Polish and Russian literature.

== Life ==
After completing secondary school, Kazys Uscila graduated from Vilnius Pedagogical School and then worked as a teacher in the Trakai district. From 1965 to 1971, he studied journalism at Vilnius University in the Lithuanian capital Vilnius.

From 1967, he was a member of the editorial staff of the newspapers. From 1985 he was press instructor of the Central Committee of the Lithuanian Communist Party and correspondent of the Russian state information agency TASS of the Soviet Union. From 1993 he worked in Vilnius as Lithuanian correspondent for the Russian information agency Interfax (Moscow), which was founded in 1989 as the first non-state news agency in the Soviet Union.

Since 1987, he has translated works by Polish historians such as Teodor Narbutt, Józef Ignacy Kraszewski and contemporary authors such as Jerzy Giedroyc (1906–2000), Czesław Miłosz (1911–2004), Wiesław Myśliwski (born 1932), Krzysztof Zanussi (b. 1939), Andrzej Sapkowski (* 1948) and others from Polish into Lithuanian. He has also translated four books, including one novel, from Russian.

His translation of the novel ‘Tractat o łuskaniu fasoli’ ("Treatise on Peeling Beans") by Myśliwski was voted the most valuable Polish-Lithuanian translation of all time in 2013.

Kazys Uscila is a member of the Lithuanian Literary Translators' Association. He was a member of the Communist Party of the Soviet Union.

== Family ==
Kazys Uscila is married and has a son and a daughter.

== Honors ==
- 2015: Literature Prize of the Polish Authors' Society ZAiKS (for translations of Polish literature into Lithuanian)
- 2018: Knight's Cross of the Order of Merit of the Republic of Poland
