= Kazimierz Skorupka =

Kazimierz Józef Skorupka
- Born: 18 February 1901; Warsaw, partitioned Poland
- Died: 24 December 1943 (aged 42); Majdanek concentration camp

Kazimierz Józef Skorupka, codename: Dziad (18 February 1901 in Warsaw – 24 December 1943 in Majdanek) was a Polish Scoutmaster (harcmistrz), Polish Army officer and member of the Polish resistance during the Second World War. He was murdered by the Nazis in a concentration camp.

== Biography ==
Skorupka was born to a modest civil-servant family. After completing primary school, he attended the Chrzanowski Gymnasium, where on 2 July 1914 he joined the secret Tadeusz Reytan Scout Chapter (also known as 2 WDH); soon he went on his first scout camp.

In the summer of 1915, the town of Warsaw was evacuated. Skorupka and his family left to Russia, to the town of Klińce, near Homel. There he joined a Scouting unit secretly organised by Polish evacuees. Between 1916 and 1917, he took part in two Scout camps. In 1918, Kazimierz returned to Poland alone. He then studied at the Konarski Technical School, where he joined 10 WDH and achieved the rank of "Scout" (wywiadowca).

In August 1920, Skorupka was mobilised. In December of that year, he founded the 1st Kamionkowska Scouting Chapter in Grochów, which was joined by a platoon from 32 WDH, under the command of Janek Makowski. On 6 May 1921, the group was assigned the number "22" (which is the traditional number of the first Scouting Chapter in Grochów, founded in 1915 by Stefan Mikołajewski), as well as the patron Wladislaus the Short. Skorupka remained with 22 WDH for the remainder of his life.

In 1938 he was awarded the "Silver Cross of Merit" (Srebrny Krzyż Zasługi), for social work carried out under the Scouts. When the war broke out in 1939, he organised the Scouts from Praga (a quarter of Warsaw) for service on the "Scout War Medical Services" (Pogotowie Wojenne Harcerzy), also directing the "Scout Communication Services" (harcerska służba łączności). For his part in the defence of Warsaw, he was awarded the "Cross of Bravery" (Krzyż Walecznych). From the start of the occupation, Skorupka was the "spiritual leader", so to say, of the "Cospiratory Scouts" (konspiracyjne harcerstwo), the Szare Szeregi (Grey Ranks) from Praga. He proceeded to adopt his prewar nickname – Dziad ("Old man") – as his codename.

Skorupka then became completely absorbed with the resistance work, and he became the communications liaison to the commander of the "Home Army’s" Praga division. His ordinary job as a tram driver helped to cover his organisational work.

When asked by Stanisław "Orsza" Broniewski (successor of Naczelnik Szarych Szeregów) about how many Scouts there were in Praga, Skorupka replied that there were 3,000. When asked on what basis he arrived at that figure, he replied: "All I have to do is whistle and 3,000 boys will assemble themselves on the corner of Targowa and Zamoyskiego St. That is how many were in the Praga Chapter on 1 September 1939, nothing has changed here!". In reality, the actual number was far smaller.

On 17 August 1942, Skorupka was arrested by the Gestapo, having managed to inform those closest to him that the Nazis knew about his conspiratory activities. He nonetheless resisted the Gestapo's interrogation, and did not reveal the names of his co-conspirators. In early 1943, Skorupa was taken to a concentration camp in Majdanek. One of the last traces he left were documents confirming his arrival at the camp – which are currently found in the concentration camp's museum – on a list of prisoners kept by the camp's resistance section. On this list, he is noted under number 273: "Kazimierz Skorupka, born 18 February 1908, son of Adam and Elenor". The second trace of the last days of Kazimierz Skorupka are the testimonies of former prisoners who describe someone whose profile fits that of Skorupka. He was classified as a political prisoner and was often taken for interrogation. He would be taken in the mornings and return in the evenings, having been beaten, his health degrading progressively. One evening, he did not return to the prisoners' barracks.

In August 1944 Kazimierz Skorupka posthumously received a second "Cross of Bravery" (Krzyż Walecznych), being promoted to "Second Lieutenant".
