= Górne, West Pomeranian Voivodeship =

Górne
- Settlement
- Location within Poland
- Coordinates: 53°7′N 14°58′E
- Country: Poland
- Voivodeship: West Pomeranian
- County: Pyrzyce
- Gmina: Pyrzyce

Górne [ˈɡurnɛ] is a settlement in the administrative district of Gmina Pyrzyce, within Pyrzyce County, West Pomeranian Voivodeship, in north-western Poland. It lies approximately 6 km (4 mi) east of Pyrzyce and 42 km (26 mi) south-east of the regional capital Szczecin.

For the history of the region, see History of Pomerania.
