= Stróżewo, West Pomeranian Voivodeship =

Stróżewo
- Village
- Location within Poland
- Coordinates: 53°10′N 14°58′E
- Country: Poland
- Voivodeship: West Pomeranian
- County: Pyrzyce
- Gmina: Pyrzyce
- Population: 329

Stróżewo [struˈʐɛvɔ] is a village in the administrative district of Gmina Pyrzyce, within Pyrzyce County, West Pomeranian Voivodeship, in north-western Poland. It lies approximately 7 km (4 mi) north-east of Pyrzyce and 38 km (24 mi) south-east of the regional capital Szczecin.

For the history of the region, see History of Pomerania.

The village has a population of 329.
