= Ryszewko, West Pomeranian Voivodeship =

Ryszewko
- Village
- Location within Poland
- Coordinates: 53°11′43″N 14°51′9″E
- Country: Poland
- Voivodeship: West Pomeranian
- County: Pyrzyce
- Gmina: Pyrzyce
- Population: 225

Ryszewko [rɨˈʂɛfkɔ] (German: Klein Rischow) is a village in the administrative district of Gmina Pyrzyce, within Pyrzyce County, West Pomeranian Voivodeship, in north-western Poland. It lies approximately 8 km (5 mi) north of Pyrzyce and 31 km (19 mi) south-east of the regional capital Szczecin.

For the history of the region, see History of Pomerania.

The village has a population of 225.
