= Letnin =

- Village
- Location within Poland
- Coordinates: 53°6′N 14°59′E
- Country: Poland
- Voivodeship: West Pomeranian
- County: Pyrzyce
- Gmina: Pyrzyce
- Population: 334

Letnin [ˈlɛtnin] is a village in the administrative district of Gmina Pyrzyce, within Pyrzyce County, West Pomeranian Voivodeship, in north-western Poland. It lies approximately 8 km (5 mi) south-east of Pyrzyce and 45 km (28 mi) south-east of the regional capital Szczecin.

For the history of the region, see History of Pomerania.

The village has a population of 334.
