= Okunica =

- Village
- Location within Poland
- Coordinates: 53°11′N 14°56′E
- Country: Poland
- Voivodeship: West Pomeranian
- County: Pyrzyce
- Gmina: Pyrzyce
- Population: 303

Okunica [ɔkuˈnit͡sa] (German: Friedrichsthal in Pommern) is a village in the administrative district of Gmina Pyrzyce, within Pyrzyce County, West Pomeranian Voivodeship, in north-western Poland. It lies approximately 7 km (4 mi) north-east of Pyrzyce and 35 km (22 mi) south-east of the regional capital Szczecin.

For the history of the region, see History of Pomerania.

The village has a population of 303.
