= Krzemlin =

- Village
- Location within Poland
- Coordinates: 53°4′N 14°52′E
- Country: Poland
- Voivodeship: West Pomeranian
- County: Pyrzyce
- Gmina: Pyrzyce

Population
  - Total: 833

Krzemlin [ˈkʂɛmlin] (German: Kremlin) is a village in the administrative district of Gmina Pyrzyce, within Pyrzyce County, West Pomeranian Voivodeship, in north-western Poland. It lies approximately 8 km (5 mi) south of Pyrzyce and 44 km (27 mi) south-east of the regional capital Szczecin.

For the history of the region, see History of Pomerania.

The village has a population of 833.
