= Brzesko, West Pomeranian Voivodeship =

Brzesko
- Village
- Location within Poland
- Coordinates: 53°7′30″N 15°0′40″E
- Country: Poland
- Voivodeship: West Pomeranian
- County: Pyrzyce
- Gmina: Pyrzyce
- Elevation: 50 m (160 ft)
- Population: 762

Brzesko [ˈbʐɛskɔ] (German Brietzig) is a village in the administrative district of Gmina Pyrzyce, within Pyrzyce County, West Pomeranian Voivodeship, in north-western Poland. It lies approximately 9 km (6 mi) east of Pyrzyce and 44 km (27 mi) south-east of the regional capital Szczecin.

For the history of the region, see History of Pomerania.

The village has a population of 762.
