= Ryszewo, West Pomeranian Voivodeship =

Ryszewo
- Village
- Location within Poland
- Coordinates: 53°11′N 14°51′E
- Country: Poland
- Voivodeship: West Pomeranian
- County: Pyrzyce
- Gmina: Pyrzyce
- Population: 173

Ryszewo [rɨˈʂɛvɔ] (German: Groß Rischow), is a village in the administrative district of Gmina Pyrzyce, within Pyrzyce County, West Pomeranian Voivodeship, in north-western Poland. It lies approximately 6 km (4 mi) north of Pyrzyce and 32 km (20 mi) south-east of the regional capital Szczecin.

For the history of the region, see History of Pomerania.

The village has a population of 173.
