= Ostrowica, West Pomeranian Voivodeship =

Ostrowica
- Village
- Location within Poland
- Coordinates: 53°13′N 14°50′E
- Country: Poland
- Voivodeship: West Pomeranian
- County: Pyrzyce
- Gmina: Pyrzyce

Ostrowica [ɔstrɔˈvit͡sa] is a village in the administrative district of Gmina Pyrzyce, within Pyrzyce County, West Pomeranian Voivodeship, in north-western Poland. It lies approximately 10 km (6 mi) north of Pyrzyce and 28 km (17 mi) south-east of the regional capital Szczecin.

For the history of the region, see History of Pomerania.
