= Krzemlinek =

- Settlement
- Location within Poland
- Coordinates: 53°3′N 14°51′E
- Country: Poland
- Voivodeship: West Pomeranian
- County: Pyrzyce
- Gmina: Pyrzyce

Krzemlinek [kʂɛmˈlinɛk] is a settlement in the administrative district of Gmina Pyrzyce, within Pyrzyce County, West Pomeranian Voivodeship, in north-western Poland. It lies approximately 10 km (6 mi) south of Pyrzyce and 45 km (28 mi) south-east of the regional capital Szczecin.

For the history of the region, see History of Pomerania.
