= Rzepnowo =

- Village
- Location within Poland
- Coordinates: 53°9′N 14°50′E
- Country: Poland
- Voivodeship: West Pomeranian
- County: Pyrzyce
- Gmina: Pyrzyce
- Population: 139

Rzepnowo [ʐɛpˈnɔvɔ] is a village in the administrative district of Gmina Pyrzyce, within Pyrzyce County, West Pomeranian Voivodeship, in north-western Poland. It lies approximately 4 km (2 mi) north-west of Pyrzyce and 34 km (21 mi) south-east of the regional capital Szczecin.

For the history of the region, see History of Pomerania.

The village has a population of 139.
