= Brzezin =

- Village
- Location within Poland
- Coordinates: 53°11′N 14°54′E
- Country: Poland
- Voivodeship: West Pomeranian
- County: Pyrzyce
- Gmina: Pyrzyce
- Population: 190

Brzezin [ˈbʐɛʑin] (formerly German: Briesen) is a village in the administrative district of Gmina Pyrzyce, within Pyrzyce County, West Pomeranian Voivodeship, in north-western Poland. It is situated approximately 6 km (4 mi) north of Pyrzyce and 34 km (21 mi) south-east of the regional capital Szczecin.

== Etymology ==
The name "Brzezin" is believed to originate from the Polish word for birch.brzoza In 1937, the Bund Deutscher Osten urged the village mayor to change the settlement's name to Birkenhain.

For the history of the region, see History of Pomerania.

The village has a population of 190.
