= Żabów =

- Village
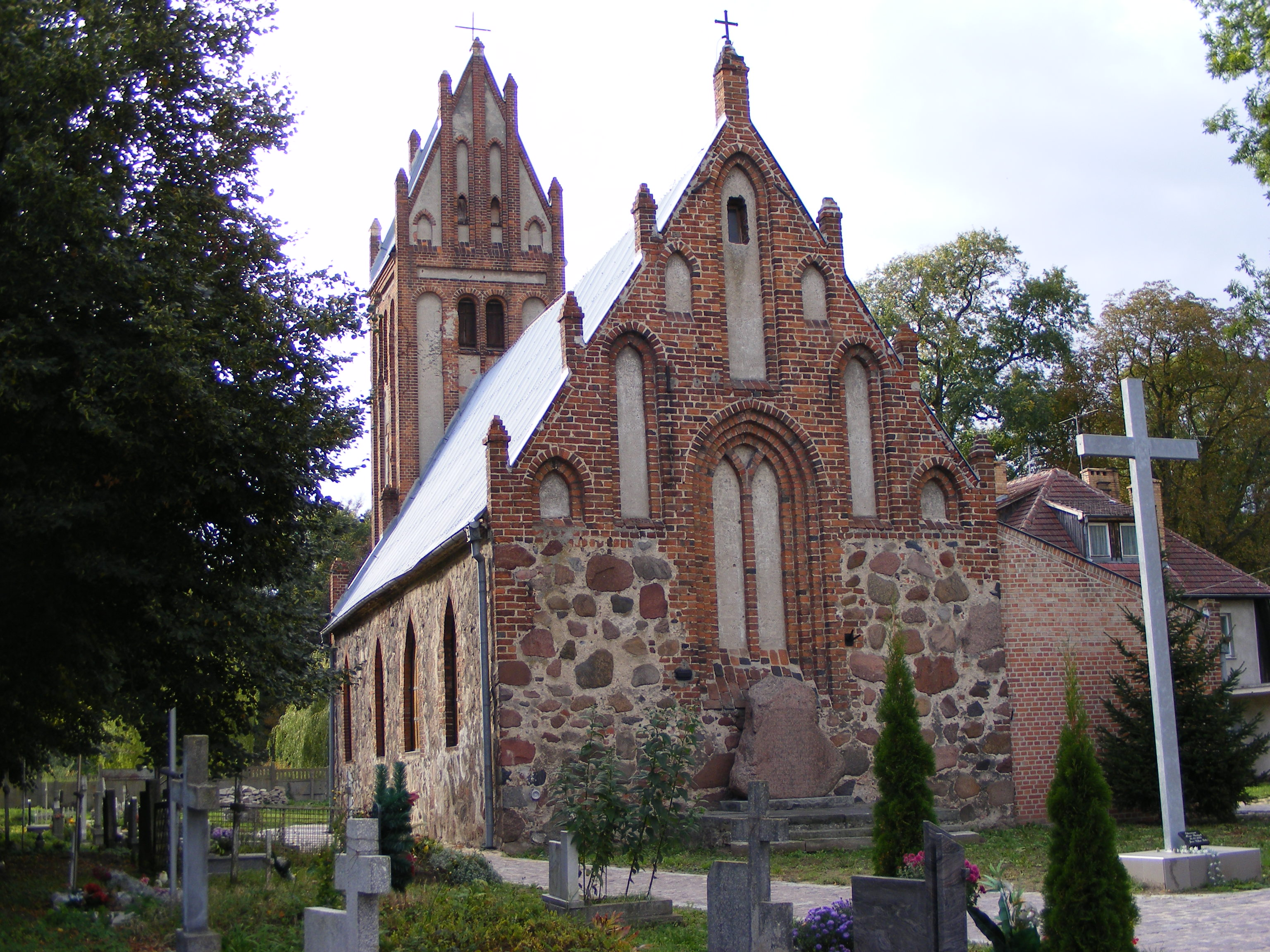
- Church

- Location within Poland
- Coordinates: 53°11′N 14°50′E
- Country: Poland
- Voivodeship: West Pomeranian
- County: Pyrzyce
- Gmina: Pyrzyce
- Population: 1,500

Żabów [ˈʐabuf] (German: Sabow) is a village in the administrative district of Gmina Pyrzyce, within Pyrzyce County, West Pomeranian Voivodeship, in north-western Poland. It lies approximately 7 km (4 mi) north-west of Pyrzyce and 31 km (19 mi) south-east of the regional capital Szczecin.

Żabów has one National Primary School (Szkoła Podstawowa im. Mikołaja Kopernika)

For the history of the region, see History of Pomerania.

The village has a population of 1,380.
