= Mechowo, Pyrzyce County =

Mechowo
- Village
- Location within Poland
- Coordinates: 53°8′N 14°58′E
- Country: Poland
- Voivodeship: West Pomeranian
- County: Pyrzyce
- Gmina: Pyrzyce
- Population: 171

Mechowo [mɛˈxɔvɔ] is a village in the administrative district of Gmina Pyrzyce, within Pyrzyce County, West Pomeranian Voivodeship, in north-western Poland. It lies approximately 6 km (4 mi) east of Pyrzyce and 41 km (25 mi) south-east of the regional capital Szczecin.

For the history of the region, see History of Pomerania.

The village has a population of 171.
