= Obromino =

- Village
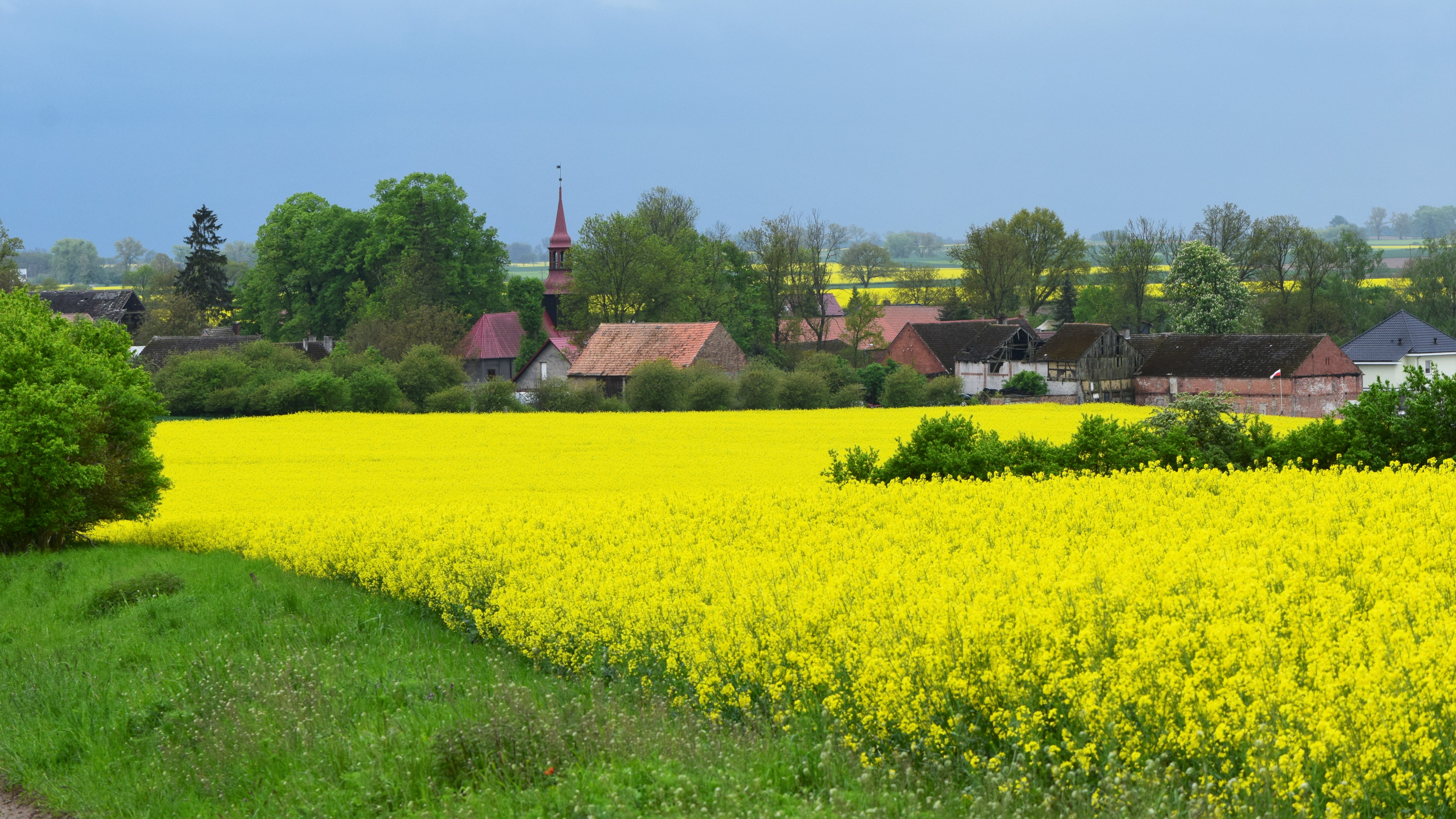
- Obromino

- Location within Poland
- Coordinates: 53°6′49″N 14°56′51″E
- Country: Poland
- Voivodeship: West Pomeranian
- County: Pyrzyce
- Gmina: Pyrzyce

Population
  - Total: 166

Obromino [ɔbrɔˈminɔ] (German: Wobbermin) is a village in the administrative district of Gmina Pyrzyce, within Pyrzyce County, West Pomeranian Voivodeship, in north-western Poland. It lies approximately 5 km (3 mi) south-east of Pyrzyce and 42 km (26 mi) south-east of the regional capital Szczecin.

For the history of the region, see History of Pomerania.

The village has a population of 166.
