= Nieborowo =

- Village
- Location within Poland
- Coordinates: 53°12′1″N 14°48′5″E
- Country: Poland
- Voivodeship: West Pomeranian
- County: Pyrzyce
- Gmina: Pyrzyce
- Population: 268

Nieborowo [ɲɛbɔˈrɔvɔ] (German: Isinger) is a village in the administrative district of Gmina Pyrzyce, within Pyrzyce County, West Pomeranian Voivodeship, in north-western Poland. It lies approximately 10 km (6 mi) north-west of Pyrzyce and 29 km (18 mi) south-east of the regional capital Szczecin.

For the history of the region, see History of Pomerania.

The village has a population of 268.
