= Pstrowice =

- Village
- Location within Poland
- Coordinates: 53°5′N 14°56′E
- Country: Poland
- Voivodeship: West Pomeranian
- County: Pyrzyce
- Gmina: Pyrzyce
- Population: 146

Pstrowice [pstrɔˈvit͡sɛ] is a village in the administrative district of Gmina Pyrzyce, within Pyrzyce County, West Pomeranian Voivodeship, in north-western Poland. It lies approximately 7 km (4 mi) south-east of Pyrzyce and 44 km (27 mi) south-east of the regional capital Szczecin.

For the history of the region, see History of Pomerania.

The village has a population of 146.
