= Gmina Pyrzyce =

Gmina Pyrzyce Pyrzyce Commune
- Gmina
- Flag Coat of arms
- Interactive map of Gmina Pyrzyce
- Coordinates (Pyrzyce): 53°8′N 14°53′E
- Country: Poland
- Voivodeship: West Pomeranian
- County: Pyrzyce
- Seat: Pyrzyce

Area
  - Total: 204.40 km^{2} (78.92 sq mi)

Population (2006)
  - Total: 19,515
  - Density: 95.475/km^{2} (247.28/sq mi)
  - Urban: 12,642
  - Rural: 6,873
- Website: https://www.pyrzyce.um.gov.pl/

Gmina Pyrzyce is an urban-rural gmina (administrative district) in Pyrzyce County, West Pomeranian Voivodeship, in north-western Poland. Its seat is the town of Pyrzyce, which lies approximately 38 kilometres (24 mi) south-east of the regional capital Szczecin.

The gmina covers an area of 204.40 square kilometres (78.9 sq mi), and as of 2006 its total population is 19,515 (out of which the population of Pyrzyce amounts to 12,642, and the population of the rural part of the gmina is 6,873).

== Villages ==
Apart from the town of Pyrzyce, Gmina Pyrzyce contains the villages and settlements of Brzesko, Brzezin, Czernice, Giżyn, Górne, Krzemlin, Krzemlinek, Letnin, Mechowo, Mielęcin, Młyny, Nieborowo, Nowielin, Obromino, Okunica, Ostrowica, Pstrowice, Ryszewko, Ryszewo, Rzepnowo, Stróżewo, Turze and Żabów.

== Neighbouring gminas ==
Gmina Pyrzyce is bordered by the gminas of Banie, Bielice, Kozielice, Lipiany, Myślibórz, Przelewice, Stare Czarnowo and Warnice.
