= Gustav Hirschfeld =

German classical archaeologist (1847–1895)

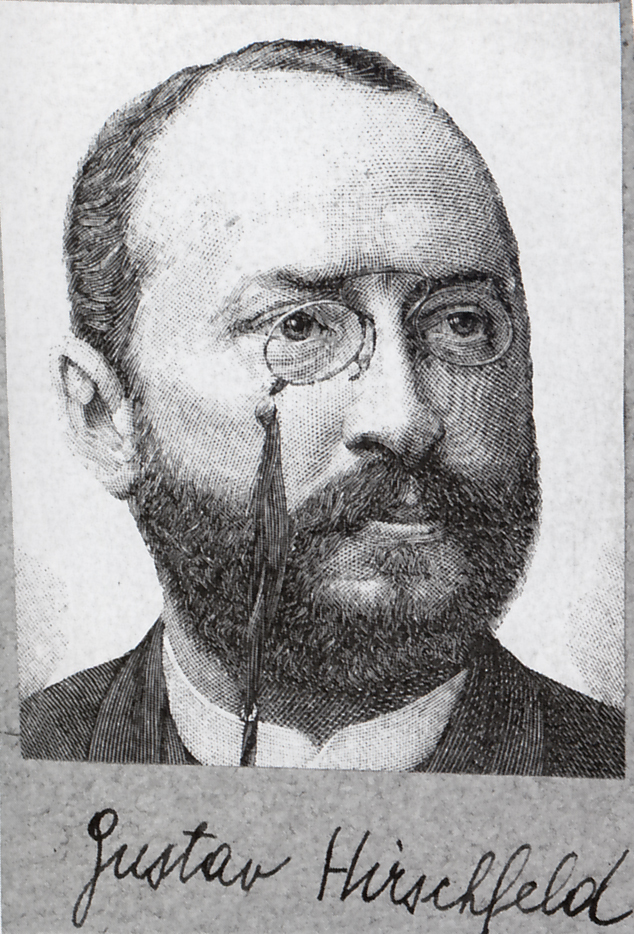
- Gustav Hirschfeld

Signature
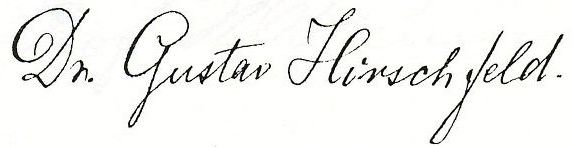

Gustav Hirschfeld (4 November 1847, Pyritz – 10 April 1895, Wiesbaden) was a German classical archaeologist. He was the great-uncle of Walter Benjamin.

== Life ==
Born into a Jewish merchant family, he studied in Tübingen, Leipzig and Berlin and from 1870 stayed in Greece, Italy and Asia Minor as a stipendary of the German Archaeological Institute. From 1875 to 1877 he led the German excavations at Olympia, for which he was appointed extraordinary professor (1878) then ordinary professor (1880) at the University of Königsberg.

== Works ==
- Tituli statuarum sculptorumque graecorum (Berlin 1871)
- Athena und Marsyas (Berlin 1872)
- Paphlagonische Felsengräber (Berlin 1885)
- Berichte über alte Geographie (1885)
- Die Felsenreliefs in Kleinasien und das Volk der Hittiter (1887)
- Griechische Inschriften des Britischen Museums (1893)
- he contributed to the first two volumes of Ausgrabungen zu Olympia (Berlin 1877-78)
- From 1884 he wrote on the geographical investigation of ancient culture in the Geographischen Jahrbuch
- Aus dem Orient (posthumously published 1897)

== Literature ==
- Franz Rühl (1905). "Hirschfeld, Gustav" . Allgemeine Deutsche Biographie (in German). Vol. 50. Leipzig: Duncker & Humblot. pp. 367–372.
- Gilman, D. C.; Peck, H. T.; Colby, F. M., eds. (1905). "Hirschfeld, Gustav" . New International Encyclopedia (1st ed.). New York: Dodd, Mead.
