= Trevor Corry =

British merchant and diplomat

Sir Trevor Corry
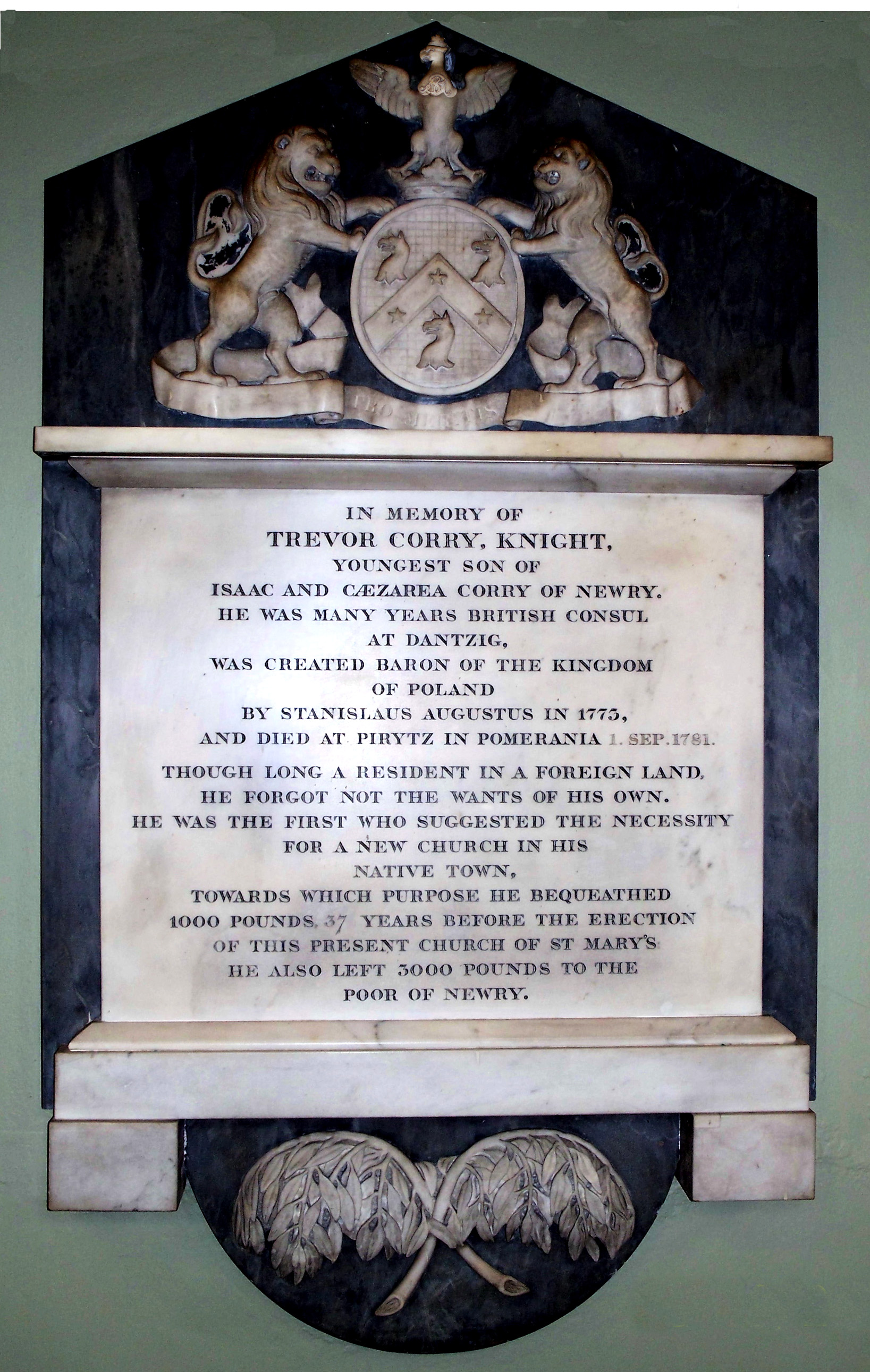
- Corry's memorial in St. Mary's Church, Newry. The Polish Eagle sits atop the coat of arms.
- Born: 1724; Newry, Ireland
- Died: 1 September 1780 (aged 55–56); Pyritz, Prussia
- Occupations: Diplomat, merchant
- Title: Baron to the Throne of Poland

Sir Trevor Corry, Baron of Poland (1724 – 1 September 1780) was a British merchant and diplomat. He spent many years in Danzig, (Note: In 18th-century British sources, the city's name was often spelled "Dantzig".) Polish–Lithuanian Commonwealth (now Gdańsk, Poland), where he acquired a considerable fortune. He acted as consul to Kings George II and George III in Danzig during the Seven Years' War and until his death in 1780.

As consul, he was responsible for sending information to the Secretary of State in London. Many of the reports were concerning the complex political and military developments happening in and around Poland in general and at the port of Danzig in particular. Among many other things, he reported on the trade-in timber intended for the building of warships and on the crippling taxation being imposed on the city of Danzig.

Corry was given the title "Baron to the Throne of Poland" on 20 October 1773 by the King of Poland, Stanisław II Augustus. On 29 March 1776, he was knighted by King George III.

His death triggered a long, drawn-out dispute regarding his estate and wealth.

== Family history ==
Trevor Corry was descended from Walter Garuth Corry who was born in 1620 in Dumfrieshire in Scotland. Shortly after the birth of Walter Garuth Corry's son Walter Corry in 1635, the family moved to Ireland as part of the Ulster Plantations.

Walter Corry became a cornet in the Dragoons of the Cromwelliam army. In 1667 the Rockcorry Estate was granted to Walter Corry by King Charles II. He became the High Sheriff of County Monaghan in 1672 and built the town of Newtoncorry (later renamed Rockcorry) and, the now vanished, Rockcorry Castle.

Walter's son Isaiah or Isaac was born at Rockcorry, possibly in 1655. There is some evidence to suggest that, in 1689, Isaiah was attainted by the Catholic King Charles II but he seems to have regained his estate shortly afterwards. Isaiah held the post of High Sheriff of County Monaghan, previously held by his father who had died in 1699.

Isaiah's eldest son Isaac was born in 1690 or 1691 at Abbey Yard in Newry where he became a merchant. He married Cæzarea Smyth. Isaiah and Cæzarea had seven children, their third and youngest son, born at Newry in 1724, was Trevor Corry. Cæzarea died when Trevor was three and his father Isaac died in 1752. Trevor Corry's brother, Edward Corry, became MP for Newry. Edward's son, Isaac Corry, succeeded his father as MP for Newry and by 1799 had risen to the post of Irish Chancellor of the Exchequer and High Treasurer of Ireland.

== Consul in Danzig (Gdańsk) ==
=== The Seven Years' War: 1754–1763 ===
On 30 March 1754 King George II appointed Trevor Corry "to be his Majesty's Consul to the Republick of Dantzig" in Poland – now known as Gdańsk. He was recommended for the post by the Earl of Hillsborough. He arrived in Danzig in mid-May 1754. His work, which was unpaid, involved making regular reports back to the Secretary of State to the Northern Department at St. James' Palace in London.

The city of Danzig had suffered a slow economic decline during the wars of the early eighteenth century and had been held by the Russians for a short time after the Siege of Danzig in 1734. During Corry's time the city of Danzig remained part of Poland although, for much of the time, it was surrounded by Prussian held territory.

1756 had seen the beginning of the Seven Years' War in which Britain was allied with the Prussians, some German states and, from 1762, the Portuguese. The opposing side was made up of France, Russia, Austria, Sweden, Saxony and, from 1762, Spain. In the summer of 1757, the Russians had invaded Ducal Prussia. On 25 May 1757 Corry wrote to the Secretary of State saying

there have been two or three Russian men of war of forty & fifty Guns each, cruising of this Harbour these eight days past – bringing up and searching all Vessels they meet with, (a thing never before known); 'tis imagined they intend making Prizes of Ships sailing under the Prussian Flag.

On 7 September Corry wrote

a very hot engagement has happened between the Prussian and Russian Armies ... the Prussians have suffered very severely from the Enemy's Cannon, They having attack'd the Russ in their Entrenchments, which was not attended with the expected success, or indeed was it all together so prudent considering how strongly they had fortified their situation ... we may soon hear of a second Engagement, which will probably decide in whose hands Koningsberg shall remain this Winter.

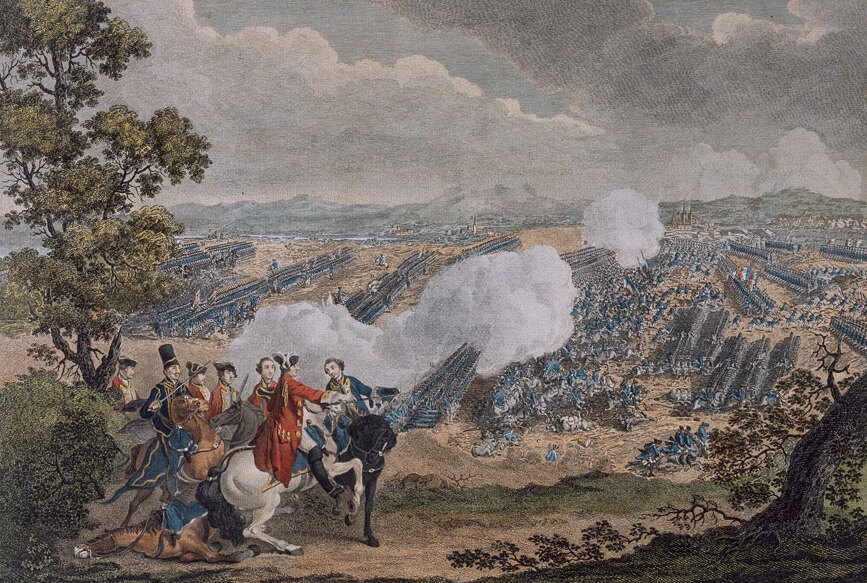
1759 depiction of the Battle of Minden

During the winter of 1757 to 1758, the Russians occupied Ducal Prussia including the area around Danzig, where they remained until 1762. Early in 1758 Corry confirmed that the Russians had taken several towns close to Danzig, and were "about five or six dutch miles from hence which has alarmed the Burghers here not a little". All this had prompted the "raising of another Regiment to consist of one thousand men" to defend Danzig and the ordering of "the Wet Trenches round the City to be open'd and made free of Ice, which is already done, so the Inhabitants are not now afraid of any sudden surprise." By May the Russians were camped about 19 miles (30 km) to the south of Danzig and, having been denied access to enter the city, were "in want of many things, necessary for an Army marching out of their own Dominions".

The first part of 1759 saw several defeats of the Prussians, and France was planning to invade Britain. In September 1759 Corry was in Hamburg reporting the victory of the Anglo-German army under Prince Ferdinand, the Prussian field marshal, over 60,000 French troops, at the Battle of Minden, "I take the liberty to acquaint your Lordship that the Battle agained by Prince Ferdinand the beginning of last Month, has been of vast detriment to the French Army, I having met on my way hither from Amsterdam, at least one thousand Deserters".

In late September 1759 Corry arrived back in Danzig where he had "found Ten Russian Men of War lying in our Road, which brought with them three thousand Troops ..." The Russians were still close by in January 1760 but the general in charge of them had been sent "some Presents, which no doubt were kindly received, and in return he has given Orders that none of his Troops shall come nearer this City than one German Mile". But, in the following July, the Russians had "landed about three thousand fresh Troops [at Danzig], who are soon to be followed by Nine thousand more, to reinforce their Army." The build-up of Russian troops in the area continued all year and towards the end of 1760 Corry was pessimistic about the Prussian situation "unless a good reinforcement of Troops can be dispatched by Prince Ferdinand, to the assistance of His Prussian Majesty ..." In December the Prussians had a victory and "this Country just now swarms with the flying Russians" but the inhabitants of Danzig were still nervous as many Russians remained in the area around the city so "The Magistracy ... have ordered all the Guards to be doubled & the City Gates to be shut at four O'Clock in the Evening".

From around the end of 1760 until the summer of 1761 Corry was in England. The Prussian-held town of Colberg was besieged by Russian forces from August to December 1761. Corry travelled back to Danzig and then on to Berlin where he wrote to the Secretary of State, (the future Prime Minister, John Stuart, 3rd Earl of Bute), on 4 September 1761, saying that

having made it my business on my Journey hither to come as near Colberg as possible, I had an opportunity of not only seeing the position of the Russian Army, but of their Fleet, from whence alone the City has been bombarded ... I do not think they will make themselves Masters of the Place, tho they may in a good measure destroy the Buildings

He was wrong, for the town of Colberg, the Prussian's last port on the Baltic Sea, was captured by the Russians soon afterwards. From Berlin he travelled to Amsterdam, via Hanover, from where he wrote, on 22 September, to report on the movements of the French Army.

The Treaty of Saint Petersburg was concluded on 5 May 1762 and ended the fighting between Prussia and Russia. On 3 June Corry wrote "I find the greatest Harmony to Subsist between them [the Russians] & the Prussians, in consequence of the Peace lately concluded ... which indeed saved all the Prussian Territories in this Neighbourhood from desolation". In November Corry wrote "Since the Russians return'd to their own Country, all has been quiet in these Parts, and the Inhabitants think themselves happily relieved of these unpolish'd People."

In February 1763, the two Treaties of Hubertusburg and Paris brought an end to the Seven Years' War. The Polish King, August III, died in October 1763 and was replaced by the young Polish nobleman, Stanisław II Augustus. On 30 May 1764 Corry predicted that the peace between Prussia and Russia "will certainly be the means of establishing Graff Paniatofsky on the Polish Throne without occasioning any disturbances in that Kingdome & the more sensible Poles must think this a lucky step, in preventing much bloodshed & confusion to their country." Corry said this was "not without opposition from many of the Polish Nobles ... all has been pretty quiet in that Kingdom & those Nobles who have been disgusted 'tis thought will be obliged to acquiesce in what has happened".

=== Other conflicts ===
In 1767 Catherine the Great of Russia made Poland a Russian protectorate thereby provoked a Catholic uprising by the Confederation of the Bar. In the summer of 1768, the actions of the Confederates prompted Corry to write "the troubles in Poland have been daily increasing, & many Outrages committed ... a large Body of Russians are on their March to Poland ... On whose arrival ... no doubt Peace may Soon be restored". Corry was not convinced of the integrity of these freedom fighters for in the following January he said

the Troubles & Barbarities in Poland, committed by the Confederates on their Neighbours, still continue, without any distinction of Profession, or otherwise, which plainly shews that these outrages are only committed with the view of Plunder. The Posts throughout all Parts of Poland, are likewise robbed daily, & no security for Travellers, as the Roads are overall full of Robbers.

In July 1770

a large Body of Prussian Hussars, marched up within a hundred paces of the City Gates ... in consequence of which, the Russian & Danish Residents, with your Lordships Humble Servant, drove out directly about 3 miles of, to the Commander of these Troops ... Since then the Gates of the City have been kept entirely Shut, the Bridges drawn up, & nothing but Threatenings and Excesses on the part of the Prussians ... indeed they are of Such a Nature, & so different from the Behaviour of regular Troops, that ... all... must be Shockt & astonished at ... All Trade here is now at an End, to the great Detriment of His Polish Majesty's Revenues.

A few days later the Prussian Resident had persuaded the Prussian troops

to retire out of the Territories ... but the Officers, as well as the Common Men, were loaded with plunderd Money, and all other things they could lay their hands on, & were portable ... and what is still more shocking is the Barbaritys which the Prussian Hussars Day and Night commit against the Poor Polanders, who come here to sell their Goods, under the pretext of enlisting them. In short without any Shame, they audaciously take by force, such People as are fit for their Service & carry them by force, and in a triumphal manner, out of this City. ... This need not further be called a free City.

Map of Danzig sent to the Secretary of State on 22 March 1773

On 5 August 1772, Frederick the Great of Prussia engineered the partitioning of Poland so that much of the country was given over to the control of Russia, Prussia and Austria. However, the majority of Poland remained under the control of King Stanisław Augustus and there followed a brief period of peace in Poland's troubled history. At the time of the partition the inhabitants of Danzig, although surrounded by Prussian territories, fought fiercely for it to remain part of Poland. In September 1772, Corry reported that the Prussian King "has begun His long intended Operations in this Province, by taking possession of Elbing, Marienburg, & other Towns, God knows when this dismemberment of Poland will end, or how it may go for this City ... The Polish Troops in Elbing it seems, made some shew of defence so that the Prussians were oblig’d to spring the Gates with Cannon." Soon afterwards the Prussians, violating the declaration they had made, took possession of all the surrounding area and the sea approaches. Corry commented, "It is not to be imagined the Consternation that this Country is just now thrown into by these Procedures." However, Corry wrote "The Fortifications of this City are very strong, & every thing put in the best order of defence ... we could hold out a siege for at least Six Months ..." On 22 March 1773 Corry sent the Secretary of State several maps showing the boundaries of the area belonging to the city.

By the following year, things seemed to have calmed down, for on 4 February Corry wrote to the Secretary of State saying all was quiet in the city and its surroundings.

=== Trade and taxation ===
Corry's other work included the sending of intelligence concerning trade to and from the city of Danzig. Imports from Britain included salt, coal, tobacco and manufactured goods. The trade-in tobacco alone was worth £100,000 annually. Exports to Britain included corn, linen, timber, wool, and saltpetre.

As Britain was blockading French ports, the French commissioned ships from neutral Holland to transport much needed supplies from Danzig. These included timber to build Men-of-War, grain to relieve food shortages, and saltpetre used to make gunpowder. Corry bribed the Port Manager "Ten Pounds Sterling for each Ship he discovers going to France."

On 29 September 1759, Corry wrote "the French are greatly distressed for want of Oak and Firr Planks to build Ships, and two Hollands Vessels now lying here have actually engaged to load said Article for the Port of Bordeaux". He included descriptions of the vessels and estimated departure times in the "hope that there will be time enough to get these Vessels stopped passing Dover". In his next letter he expresses the hope that one of the ships "be prevented as She passes Dover, where I humbly presume it would not be amiss if two or three Vessels were appointed to be on a constant lookout". For many years Corry regularly sent lists of the names, tonnage and destination of ships loading supplies at Danzig, to London. In another letter, he informed the Secretary of State that "Ships have been freighted here and now actually loading Wheat and Rye for French Account all of whom may be very easily Stopt in the Channel and carried into Dover".

In September 1764 Corry wrote to the Secretary of State, the Earl of Sandwich, as he was concerned about "preventing the Smugling Trade, from Foreign Countrys to the Isle of Man, which, in conform to His Majestys Pleasure & Your Lordships Commands, I have communicated to the Merchants in this City, recommending the same as a Publick Warning, to such as carried on that illicit Trade, which hope may have its proper effect."

On 4 January 1762 Britain declared war on Spain and for several years Corry was on the lookout for supplies going to both the French and Spanish Admiralties. France and Spain were prevented from using the port at Danzig and were using chartered ships which used false documents claiming that the goods were being shipped from Amsterdam. In February 1780, Corry wrote, "These Captains will no doubt be furnished with false Documents, as usual ... The real Documents of such Ships are generally put into a Tin Pocket Case, so concealed behind a Panel of the Cabin Wainscot." In October 1779 Corry wrote "the French & Spanish Contractors are come to the resolution of sending Home from hence all the Warlike Stores & Planks &c. for Ship Building that they can get Neutral Ships to Load, this late Season, in the hopes they will not be so much exposed to The Kings Ships & Privateers". Danzig merchant ships bound for France and Spain were often made to sail into British ports due to the war. As Corry wrote, "the Proprietors of the Dantzig Ships Destined to France & Spain are well satisfied at their being brought up & Discharged in Brittish Ports, as they generally gain thereby." In a letter dated 8 February 1780 he reported that the Danzig yards were "well Supplied with a considerable Stock of Season’d Oak Timber & Planks for Shipbuilding, with which Sinews of War, our Enemys it seems are in want, & cannot be supplied with the like from any other Port in the Baltick, & I hope the Ships that Load these Goods may fall into our hands". The Spanish agents were "utting down the largest Oak Timbers, that can be found in the Polish Prussian Forests, for Building Ships of War."

If all went to plan, the captains of the neutral ships transporting goods to France and Spain made fortunes. Corry wrote that one captain was "to receive Thirty Guilders Hollands, equal to Three Pound sterling, for every Ton of Wheat he Loads, which is a monstrous Freight". Based on 350 tons, the average cargo weight of ships using the port of Danzig at this time, this would have made him £1,050. Letters from Corry, detailing the ships bound for France and Spain, continued until June 1780.

Danzig was increasingly affected by heavy taxation. On 20 February 1765, Corry wrote to the Secretary of State, the Earl of Sandwich, reporting that "Russian Troops ... have approached nearer to this City, in order (as 'tis imagined) to enforce the Duty intended to be laid on this Country of Polish Prussia, by the King of Poland which has occasioned the Magistracy of this City to put themselves upon their guard, by adding to their present regular Troops in Garrison, about five thousand Burghers, who now do daily military Duty." By the following month things had "taken a quite favourable turn, His Majesty [Stanislaw August Poniatowski] having been pleased to confirm all its [Danzig's] former Priviledges, tho not without costing (as 'tis imagined) a considerable Sum of money". In addition to this, by April, "His Prussian Majesty is about laying on a Duty of 10 per Cent on the value of all Goods coming from, or going into Poland ... Said Dutys would amount to an immense Sum, above half a Million Sterling per annum."

After the Prussians took possession of the territories around Danzig in 1772 they began interfering with trade in and out of the city. They refused to let ships go in or out of the harbour until they had "paid a second Duty, with double Port charges ... increasing these Dutys etc. daily, at their own pleasure." In particular, this tax was affecting "3 Ships, now loading Oak Plank, & other Materials, to build Men of War, for our Admiralty." In addition, the Prussians imposed an eight per cent tax on goods going in or out of the city from Poland. Corry warned that "most of the Powers in Europe must suffer ... & that [if] the Trade of this City, & from hence to Poland, by water, does not remain free ... the Consumpt here & throughout Poland of British Manufactured Goods, Tobacco, Salt, with many other of our Products ... would, in this case, fall entirely away." In the following March 1773, Corry reports that the duties imposed on "Oak Plank down from Poland, amounts to near 30 per cent".

In April 1773, the Senate in Danzig instructed their agent in Warsaw to call in on the Polish King to seek help in removing the duties on trade.

The King answered with a Smile. I am rejoicing at the fidelity of Your City. It is one of my greatest Consulations to see that they prove true ... I consider that City to be one of the finest Jewels in my unhappy Crown. I can not just now give you my Sentiments upon these Affairs. I must first speak with some of my Ministry, so prey return to me again in a few Hours. The Agent calld again at 11 OClock at Night, and being conveyed to The Kings Bed Chamber, His Majesty declared that there were many weighty Considerations which hinderd His explaining the Wishes of His Heart ... His Majesty would be very glad, if the Senate could find out a Method for its [Danzig's] relief & restoration of Its Liberty

In July, Corry reported the King as admitting "He is not in a Condition to Succur the City" but he wanted nothing done that would be "Prejudicial to His Right & Revenues, as being Protector of the City."

In July 1773 the double duties were still being applied "to the great detriment of Trade" so, in an attempt to stop this, the Prussian king was asked "to name & accept of a Sum that the City is capable of paying as a recompence". In November 1774 things were no better and Corry was arguing that the levies, still being imposed by the Prussians, were unjust but "This Argument, is however soon destroy'd, when People, who have the Power in their own hands, say, that Tin must pay the same Dutys as Silver." During 1775 and 1776 Corry continued to write many letters complaining about the duties being imposed by the Prussians.

On his return from a visit to England in July 1777, Corry found

The situation of this City in respect to Prussia ... be worse than when I left it, the Trade Daily burthen'd with new Taxes, unheard of Charges... & every Remonstrance respecting these Grievances, is rather made a Jest of than otherwise ... from the monstrous Duties collected by the Prussians ... there does not remain so much for the Polanders, as to purchase here to carry Home with them, the Necessaries if Life

In December trade was "more & more Burthen'd with Prussian Dutys & Taxes unheard of, but forced by them ... & no British vessel can now be repaired here in this City, without paying a heavy Tax ..."

This heavy taxation eventually resulted in the city's decline.

Corry was involved in the timber trade, and Pomerania was a major source of oak planks used in ship building and oak staves used in the manufacture of barrels. Oak was a highly prized commodity and in short supply. Most of the British oak had been used up through the building of war ships. It has been estimated that Nelson's flagship, HMS Victory, built earlier in the eighteenth century, consumed over five thousand oak trees. In Corry's time, oak was felled and floated down the Vistula River to Danzig on a mass scale. As a ship owner he may have shipped the timber to England or Ireland in his own vessels. By hindering the efforts of the French and Spanish to import timber from Danzig his motives were as much about protecting his own interests as they were about protecting the interests of England. The potash trade made fortunes for some traders at this time and played an important part in the commercial life of Poland. It is possible that Corry was also involved in the potash trade for he refers to it several times in his letters to Secretaries of State.

=== Baron to the Throne of Poland ===
The Polish monarch had the power to grant titles to foreigners. Only two titles of baron were given to migrants from the British Isles. Corry was the first of them, for on 20 October 1773, he was granted the title of Baron to the Throne of Poland and naturalisation by Stanisław Augustus. Four days later Thomas Wroughton, the Danzig Secretary in Warsaw, wrote to Corry,

Dear Sir. The Day before yesterday a Diploma or Patent was sent me from Court, to forward you. It is the Patent of Baron of Poland etc. etc. which His Majesty The King of Poland has been pleased to create & grant to you & Heirs forever, as a Mark of His Approbation & Recompence for the Zeal you have manifested in the late & present Critical Affairs of Dantzig. I heartily Congratulate you Sir on this Royal & Honorable Token of Distinction wishing you many Years the happy Enjoyment of it.

Following this, on 5 November, Corry informed the Secretary of State, The Earl of Suffolk, of "the undeserved Honour His Polish Majesty has been pleased to confer, in creating me a Baron of Poland etc. for which Mark of Distinction, I have returned my Humble Acknowledgements, but shall not attempt to make use of the Title etc. untill I get our Kings Consent ..." In another letter written on the same day Corry points out that the honour "proceeds from my Endeavors to maintain the Trade and Freedom of this His [the Polish King's] City ..." which he did "entirely for The Trade and Advantages I knew it would be of to Britain – that – & that only was my Motive".

In November 1773, The London Chronicle reported "that his Majesty the King of Poland Stanisław II Augustus has been pleased to create and grant unto Trevor Corry, Esq; his Britannic Majesty's Commissary and Consul at Danzic, and his heirs for ever, the dignity of Baron or Lord of Poland, etc." Corry now had the right to wear the White Eagle from the Royal Arms of Poland on his Coat of Arms.

In December the Earl of Suffolk, replied

I cannot help saying that however inclined I am in my private Capacity to congratulate You on any Event that gives You Pleasure and Satisfaction, I much regret Your Advancement to the Dignity of Baron of Poland, because I foresee Its inevitable Consequence of removing You from the Situation which You have so long filled with Credit & Esteem ... Nor is the Post of Commercial Agent to His Majesty's Trading Subjects properly compatible with the Honours You have received from a Foreign Prince. It will therefore become my Duty to ask His Majesty's Pleasure on the Appointment of Your Successor. But out of Attention to one who has been so long in the Service of the Crown I shall defer doing so 'till I hear from You in Answer to this Letter.

On 21 December Corry replied

I ... return many Thanks for the kind Sentiments You are pleased to express, in regard to my Conduct here, as His Majesty’s Commercial Agent, at sametime I am not a little mortified, that the unexpected & unmerited honorary Title His Polish Majesty intended me, for my endeavours, to maintain the Trade from & to Brittain, with His Dominions, should in any way prevent a continuation of my unwearied labours, for that End. But as your Lordship is pleased to observe, that such Honours from a Foreign Prince, are not properly compatible for a Person in the Character I have the Honour to represent. I shall in consequence decline accepting of the same. ... it is my request to remain here, in my former Station, or Character, as Commissary ... to continue & assist, as far as in my power, to maintain the Trade to & from Brittain, with this City, & the Kingdom of Poland, as I have begun, & in conform to the Commands and Instructions I have, or may receive from His Majesty, through Your Lordship.

On 18 January 1774, the Secretary of State wrote to Thomas Wroughton in Warsaw, saying

We perfectly agree on the Inanity of the Honors which Mr. Corry has been graced with; but had they been a thousand Times more trifling & insignificant than they are, Mr. Corry's Situation, & the Moment, rendered his Acceptance of them highly improper. Mr. Corry seems to be become sensible of this Truth, & means to decline them. If, for this Purpose, He should desire You to return the Patent, The King [King George III] has no Objections to your undertaking that Office, tho' it is not His Majesty's Pleasure that His Name should ever be mentioned in the Transaction.

On the same day the Secretary of State wrote to Corry,

As you choose to continue in The King's Service, I conclude You mean to return the Patent which would otherwise render your doing so improper. But, in this Transaction, I must caution you against making the least mention of His Majesty's Name. I am far from attempting to guess what was The King of Poland's Motive for conferring the Barony upon You; But with regard to Your own Surmise on the Occasion, I cannot help observing that it is rather new for Foreign Princes to reward His Majesty's Servants for their Zeal towards Great Britain, or for His Majesty's Servants to expect Rewards from any but their own Sovereign, who is certainly the best Judge of their Merits.

Corry replied on 4 February,

I shall return the Patent to the Dantziger Secretary at Warsaw, through whose Channel it came, and happy that I can assure Your Lordship, upon my Credit & Honour, that the Letter of thanks I had wrote His Polish Majesty never went forward – and You may depend My Lord, I shall make no mention of The King my Masters Name, in any shape what ever, on this occasion.

In spite of these assurances that he would not accept the Baronry, Corry refers to himself as "Baron" in his will, dated 1776, and in both of his codicils. He was also referred to as "Baron" in various books and articles, in the many papers relating to disputes following his death, and on his memorial plaque in St. Mary's Church, Newry. The plaque also incorporates the Polish White Eagle, a right that came with the honour of Baronry. After his marriage to Lucy Sutherland she was referred to as "Baroness" and used the title in her own will.

=== Knighthood ===
Whilst in England, on 29 March 1776, Corry was knighted by King George III. The London Gazette reported that "The King was pleased on Friday last to confer the honour of Knighthood on Trevor Corry, Esq; his Majesty’s Commissary at the city of Dantzick; and he had the honour to kiss his Majesty’s hand."

== Family and ill health ==
When, in May 1754, Corry arrived in Danzig to take up his new post as consul, he lodged at the home of a James Sutherland. James had a nine-year-old daughter named Lucy.

From 1760 Corry suffered periods of ill health complaining in September 1764 of "a violent Pain in my Breast".

In later years, after Corry's death, his executors, Weickhmann and Schmidt, were to state that during this time Corry "renewed repeated and was very frequent in his visits to ... Lucy [Sutherland] at the house of her father and his Attachment to and affection for her not only continued but greatly increased". Lucy's mother, Mary, died in 1764 and the following year, when Corry was forty one,

taking advantage of the youth Credulity and inexperience of ... Lucy ... who was then of the age of Twenty years or thereabouts and on the most solemn promises of Marrying her ... did induce and prevail on her to leave the House of her Father ... and go with him ... to his House at Dantzig and from that time they continued to live ... in the greatest harmony notwithstanding postponing their Marriage ...

In 1766 he had a daughter, Elizabeth Corry, by an unknown mistress. Elizabeth was a major beneficiary in his will. Elizabeth's mother was also mentioned but received little. Elizabeth was educated in Ireland and, at the age of fourteen, married a John Fowler. In 1780 they had a son Corry Fowler.

Early in 1774 Corry was worried about the repayment of a loan he had made. On 4 February he wrote to the Secretary of State saying that he had lent £10,000 to Sir George Colebrooke and his partners and they had not made any repayments, giving "tryfling Excuses". In order to recover the money he requested permission to go home to England for a few months and to put his nephew, Trevor Scott, in charge of his business in Danzig during his absence. The Secretary of State gave permission, saying he was "extremely glad that You can be accommodated in the Manner You desire, without any detriment to the Interests of His Majesty's Trading Subjects committed to Your Care" and finished by wishing him "a safe & pleasant Voyage". On 11 March Corry replied "I am extremely obliged for Your Lordship's kind permission to go to England ... it may be some Months before I leave this, seeing the Affairs of the City are every Day drawing nearer to a Conclusion ... think my remaining here is on this occasion very Necessary." Corry left Danzig sometime before 28 November 1775 for, on this day, his nephew, Trevor Scott, wrote to the Secretary of State saying that he had taken over the responsibilities of commercial agent.

Corry, now a knight, took the waters at Bath in May 1777. He returned to Danzig, via Berlin, in early July 1777 and, according to Weickhmann and Schmidt, "went to live and cohabit with ... Lucy ... in his house there, where they continued to live and cohabit together in the greatest harmony".

On 10 March 1778, Corry wrote to the Secretary of State, "Having been in an indifferent State of Health the Doctors recommend my going in Summer to the German or English Baths, which I hope your Lordship will indulge me in, as I shall leave my Nephew Mr. Scott here to carry on my Correspondance." The Secretary of State replied "I have laid your Letter ... before The King, & have the Satisfaction to acquaint You, that His Majesty [King George III] is graciously pleased to grant You the Leave of Absence which You desire." It was not until early May 1779 that Corry actually got to Bath.

Corry arrived back in Danzig in mid July 1779 but almost immediately started to plan his return to England. On 31 August he wrote to the Secretary of State in London saying, "the Doctors advising I intend going shortly to Bath for my Health, during my Absence Mr. Scott (my Nephew) will as usual acquaint Your Lordship of any matters that may occur worth communicating." However, on 5 October 1779 he wrote, "My Lord – By advice of the Doctors I left this last Month, but falling ill on the road, a weakness in my Limbs, obliged me to return & the Weather is now too cold for an Invalide to travel in." On 15 February 1780 he wrote

An ill state of health, the effect I believe of a cold Climate, has obliged me for some years past to drink the Bath Waters & the doctors now thinking the same absolutely necessary, I have to request your Lordships procurring me His Majesty's Gracious Permission for that purpose. I shall not however leave this [place] before the Month of May or June, nor untill I have given Your Lordship every necessary information respecting the Transactions in question.

The reply from the Secretary of State read, "As the present Situation of Affairs would make your Absence from your Post prejudicial to His Majesty's Service by depriving Us of the useful Intelligence you transmit, I hope you will be able to deferr your Journey to Bath". Following a further request for leave the Secretary of State wrote to Corry on 16 May 1780 saying, "I have laid Your Letter before the King and I have Pleasure to acquaint You that His Majesty is graciously pleased to permit You to return to England as soon as it may suit Your Convenience." On 2 June Corry wrote to the Secretary of State thanking him for permission to go to Bath. "I shall not however leave this Place, till I have found out the destination & other particulars of some Pomeranian Ships, shortly expected to arrive here, as well as that of two Dantzigers, who are busy in Loading Oak Planks & other Materials, for building ships, from the People that do Business here, for French Accompt ..." Corry added that Charles Gottfried Schipper, who had worked for him for over twenty years, would continue his work in his absence.

Corry decided to resign his post and left Danzig shortly before 27 June 1780. On 14 July the Secretary of State wrote to Corry informing him that "His Majesty has been pleased to accept your Resignation."

During late June or early July 1780, Corry was planning to retire from business and to settle in England where he intended to marry Lucy. Corry and Lucy travelled to Pyritz, now known as Pyrzyce, in Prussian Pomerania – about 210 miles (340 kilometres) to the south-west of Danzig. By the time they arrived Corry's illness had worsened so they took residence in the Post House. On 21 July 1780 Corry sent for a priest and, asked the priest "to Marry him ... and ... Lucy ... and Declared that he should be sorry to dye and leave her in a disagreeable situation and subject to be injured by his relations and thereupon the Reverend ... did ... Join him ... and ... Lucy ... in Holy matrimony together in a Room in the aforesaid Post House." Later the same day Corry wrote a short statement saying that he "was married to his dearest Lucy Sutherland ... in the presence of Yungfor Garben, Henry Lindenberg & Friedrick Kuhl ...". Friedrick Kuhl was Corry's servant.

Two days later, on 23 July, he was still in Pyritz and wrote to his partners in trade, Messrs Trevor Scott and Compy of Dantzig. He believed he was recovering from the illness and would soon be able to continue his journey. He added, "I have made my Dear Lucy to Wife, of which you know she has ever been deserving & to her I may (under God) attribute my being in the land of the living".

On 1 September 1780, Corry died at the Post House in Pyritz. A few days later Lucy took Corry's body to Danzig.

On 8 September 1780 four letters were written to Viscount Stormont, who was by now, the Secretary of State. The first letter was written by Corry's secretary, Charles Gottfried Schipper, saying "I have to inform Your Lordship of Sir Trevor Corry's Death which happened the first of this month at the Town of Pyritz in the Prussian Dominions" and proposing that Corry's nephew, Trevor Scott, should be given Corry's job. The next was from Trevor Scott saying "I think it my duty to inform Your Lordship that my Uncle Sir Trevor Corry departed this Life the 1st. Instant at Pyritz in Prussia on his Journey to England, he died of a violent Cramp in his Stomach, after a confinement of about Nine Weeks." He went on to offer himself as a replacement in Corry's job as His Majesty's Commissary and states several reasons why he was well suited for it. The next letter was from the previous occupant of Corry's post, Archibald Gibson, a Scot, who recommended his son, Alexander, as a replacement. Alexander also wrote to apply for the job saying he could get references from several people including the King of Poland. Alexander went on to suggest that Corry's conduct had not always been entirely virtuous, "Sir Trevor Corry held the Post of Commissary without receiving a salary, but he has to make it worth a great deal to him by misemploying the Protection the dignity of his Place granted him." Perhaps implying that the lack of any remuneration encouraged corruption, he requested "I beg leave to observe to your Excellency that a small appointment as Sallary will render this dignity more respectable as all the other accredited Gentlemen here have an allowance from their Courts." Alexander Gibson was successful in his application. Alexander Gibson was to become the second and last migrant from Britain to be made a baron by a Polish monarch. On this occasion it was by Friedrich II King of Prussia.

== Corry’s estate ==
=== Wills and codicils ===
Whilst in London on 20 February 1775, Corry had written a will that "considerably benefitted" Lucy Sutherland. Later that year, on 20 September, Corry was in Danzig and planning to travel. He was concerned about his journey – a concern that was fed by Lucy's father's experience in the summer of 1762 – whilst at sea his ship was met by a French privateer who robbed him of all his cash. Before leaving, Corry prepared a codicil that read

That in case of my dying on the journey I am about to take to England, I leave & bequeath unto Lucy Sutherland ... three thousand, seven hundred & ten Ducats ... also my house in the Holy Gost Street ... all my wearing apparel, Horses, Carriages, Silver Plate, Rings, Watches, & all my House Furniture, of what kind or sort soever, & also my little Negro Boy called Pharoh”. He also left Lucy a further 309 ducats making a total of 4019 ducats.

On 11 July 1776 Corry was in Newry where he made a very long and complicated will. This was slightly altered and added to by a codicil written in Danzig on 24 February 1780. Corry left "Lucy Sutherland of Dantzig aforesaid spinster the sum of one thousand pounds sterling British Currency ... all my household furniture Diamond Rings watches linen & clothes together with my black Negro servant called Pharo & all my Horses Carriages & stable furniture & harness ... the use of my plate during her life". In addition Lucy was to be the beneficiary of a trust fund of £9,000 and was to receive "all my apparell effects & ready money at Dantzig which does not exceed three hundred pounds Irish". Corry directed a £3,000 trust be set up and that the interest from this trust – about £180 a year – be "for the use and benefit of my natural daughter Elizabeth Corry." Corry's mistress and the mother of Elizabeth was to receive an annual payment of £20. Other beneficiaries of legacies, trust funds, or annual payments were Corry's relatives, servants, physician, surgeon, and the poor of Danzig and Newry. The total value of legacies and trust funds was £42,450. Other money was to be invested so as to be able to make annual payments totalling £970.

Copy of the original German version of the second or 'Pyritz Codicil' to Sir Trevor Corry's will

Corry also requested that his "body be conveyed in a leaden coffin to be interred in my Families Grave at Newry ... & it my desire that one thousand pounds Irish may be laid out in building & decorating a vault for that purpose & the further use of the family as also one thousand pounds Irish towards building a Church at Newry & erecting an organ in the same."

On 18 August 1780, whilst at the Post House in Pyritz, Corry wrote a very brief codicil, later referred to as the second or Pyritz Codicil. According to his executors, Weickhmann and Schmidt, Corry wished to "make a further and more ample Provision for his said wife in order after his death the better able her to support the Dignity of his Wife did give directions and Instructions to ... Friedrick Wilhelm Kuhl his livery servant for the Drawing and Writing a further Codicil to his Will". The codicil read, "I Trevor Corry being of sound understanding do charge this with my Will and request my dear wife that she comply with this; It is my Will that she have the half of my Fortune". After making the codicil Weickhmann and Schmidt state that "the provision he had thereby made for ... Lucy his wife ... were publick and Notorious in the Deceased Family in the Post House ... and in the Neighbourhood thereof". The "fortune" was reckoned to be about three hundred thousand dollars or about £60,000. About ten days after the codicil had been written Corry called Lucy to his bedside and read the contents of it out loud in front of his servant. He then gave Lucy the codicil telling her not to show it to anyone.

=== Disputes concerning Corry's estate ===
There followed a long drawn out series of disputes as to what should happen to Corry's fortune. After Corry's death on 1 September 1780, Lucy, now Dame Lucy, took Corry's body back to Danzig. Upon her arrival Weickhmann and Schmidt, both of whom were beneficiaries of Corry's will, went to see her and asked to be given all Corry's papers. Lucy "thereupon took the Second Codicil [the Pyritz Codicil] ... and Certificate of her Marriage ... from among the Deceased papers and put them into her Bosom ... because she did not chuse to let the Executors see them". A few hours later she deposited the certificate and codicil for safe custody with Corry's clerk, Charles Gottfried Schipper, who kept it until about 6 November 1780 when it was noticed that the codicil had not been dated. When Corry's servant, Friedrick Wilhelm Kuhl, who had written the codicil, was asked by Schipper why no date had been written he said simply that he had not been told to write it at the time but, believing the date had been 18 August 1780, immediately wrote it on the codicil and stated that Corry "knew and understood the Contents thereof and well liked and approved of the same".

On 24 September 1781 Corry's will, dated 11 July 1776, and the first codicil, dated 24 February 1780, were proved and probate granted by the Court of Prerogative in Dublin to the two executors present, John Pollock and John Nairac. The Pyritz Codicil and Corry's marriage to Lucy caused much suspicion. To support her claim, early in March 1781, Dame Lucy returned to Pyritz to seek affidavits confirming her marriage to Corry. Also, on 8 March 1781, Kuhl went before the Burgo Masters and Senate of the City of Pyritz and swore on oath that Corry "ordered him to commit to writing the original Codicil [the Pyritz codicil] ... which when he had done the said Baron Corry bid him go out, and shortly after calling him in again, he ordered him to subscribe the said Codicil as a Witness ... and at the same time observed that Trevor Corry’s Name and Seal were then thereunto set".

On 24 September 1781 Corry's will and both the codicils were proved and probate granted at the Prerogative Court of Canterbury in London with the two executors – Isaac Corry (Sir Trevor's brother) and James Portis present at the hearing.

During May or June 1782 "Friedrick Wilhelm Kuhl was by ... Dame Lucy Cory discharged at Dantzig from her service for his Ill behaviour". Weickhmann and Schmidt, who appear to have always regarded the Pyritz Codicil with either suspicion or distaste, encouraged Kuhl to make a new testimony to the Burgomaster's Court in Danzig on 22 August 1782. This stated

That the Paper called the Pyritz Codicil, of the late Baron Trevor Corry ... Was by no means made nor Signed by him at Pyritz, but that the Widow Lady Baroness Corry after the Death of her late Husband dictated the same to the Pen of him ... and that at that time the date which is now above it (18 August 1780) was not put to it – further that some time afterwards the Widow Lady Baroness Corry laid the ... Codicil folded backwards before him ... for him to sign his name to it, that the words – 'my hand Trevor Corry' and the seal were then on it.

Sometime later Baroness Corry covered the codicil with

a leaf of Paper ... and at her desire he was obliged to set above it the date of the 18th August 1780. Lastly That the Widow Lady Baroness Corry did in London In the Year 1781 more than once endeavor to prevail upon him ... to make Oath to the Codicil ... offering him One hundred Ducats to do it, but he had refused it her with these words – he neither would nor could act against his Conscience by swearing to any thing that was not true – that therefore the ... Codicil is not Genuine and right, but on the Contrary spurious and false.

By June 1784 Weickhmann and Schmidt, who were by now magistrates in Danzig, had Kuhl "by their power or Interest put above the condition of Servant and provided for by some place or appointment in the Castle of ... Dantzig and he is never permitted to come out of the said castle but is now kept therein under their Influence Controul and Government and dare not depose in this or any other Cause contrary to the interests of them".

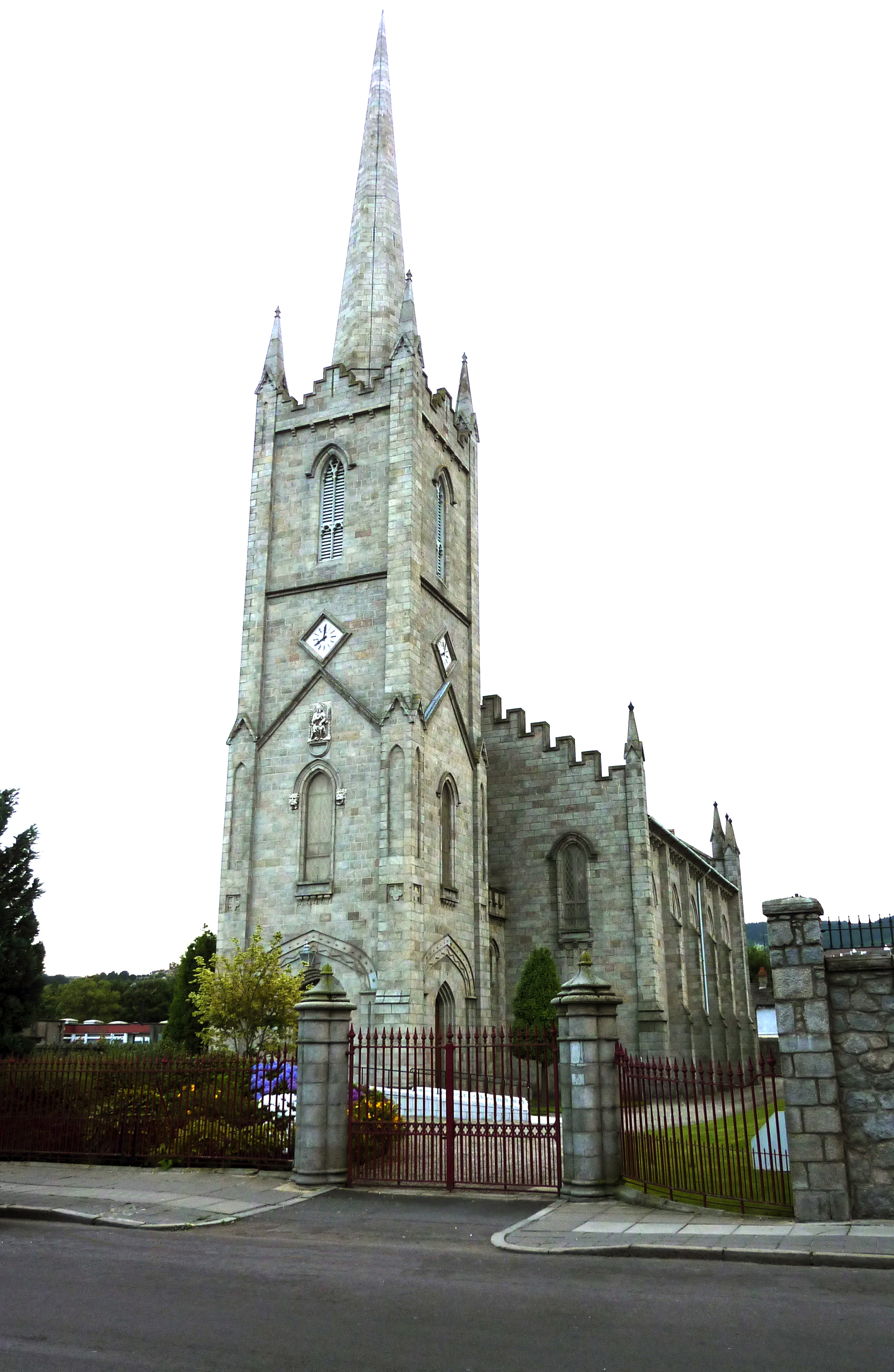
St. Mary's Church in Newry. Trevor Corry left £1000 in his will towards its construction, which was completed in 1819.

Evidence in support of the Pyritz Codicil continued to be sought. On 21 January 1783 at the Pyritz Court, Grenadier Johann Voelcker, made the following statement that in 1780

I assisted in attending the deceased Baron Von Corry while he lay ill at the Post House of this place. A short time before his death ... I heard from the Servant that Mr. Corry had with him, that if Mr. Corry should die his Wife (whom he had Married at Pyritz) would still have wherewithall to live he having bequeathed to her the half of his Fortune. Further, Doctor Kuhter ... who had the care of Mr. Corry ... Told me ... a few Days before the decease of Mr. Corry that his wife, in case Mr. Corry died, would have sufficient left to maintain her, he having bequeathed her half his Effects, and was worth Three hundred thousand Dollars." Johann had not actually witnessed the writing or signing of the codicil.

In January 1784, Lucy was living in Aldersgate Street in London and actively trying to get the Pyritz Codicil validated at the Prerogative Court of Canterbury. On 4 January she wrote her own will and instructed her executors to continue her fight at the Prerogative Court after her death. Lucy died of an illness aged about 39, and her will was proved at the Prerogative Court of Canterbury on 13 January 1784.

The will and two codicils which had been granted probate on 24 September 1781 were subject to another hearing at the Prerogative Court of Canterbury in London on 12 March 1785 during which the Pyritz Codicil was declared null and void. The will and first codicil were again proved again on 17 November 1786 and administration granted to Weickhmann and Schmidt.

Legal battles concerning Corry's estate continued for many years after his death but at least some of Corry's estate was distributed. £1,000 used towards the building St. Mary's Church in Newry and the £3,000 trust fund for the benefit of the poor of Newry was still actively in place in 1945.

== Epitaph ==
Johanna Schopenhauer, a friend and contemporary of Corry, described him as "The head of the community [of Danzig], and its greatest ornament. The English consul, Sir Trevor Corry, contributed, with his showy equipage and his coal-black negro boy, Pharaoh, to the splendour of the city." Years later, Joanna's son, the German philosopher Arthur Schopenhauer wrote

The world had never seen a resident, who stood longer or more firmly at his post, for he is still there [Danzig], though he has been dead these fifty years; he is still unburied in the great parish church; for the noble baronet, during his life, scorned our German earth, and the superstition of the sailors prevented his body being carried to England after his decease."

In 1810, twenty years after Corry's death, construction began on St Mary's Church in Newry for which Corry had left £1000 in his will. The church, which was finally completed in 1819, contains memorial plaques to many of Newry's prominent citizens, including ones to Corry and other members of his family. The inscription on his plaque reads:

In memory of Trevor Corry, Knight, youngest son of Isaac and Caezarea Corry of Newry. He served for many years British Consul at Dantzig, was created Baron of the Kingdom of Poland by Stanisław II Augustus in 1773, and died at Pirytz in Pomerania 1 Sep. 1781. (Note: The year of death given here is incorrect. Corry died on 1 September 1780.) Though long a resident in a foreign land, he forgot not the wants of his own. He was the first who suggested the necessity for a new church in his native town, towards which purpose he bequeathed 1000 Pounds, 37 years before the erection of this present Church of St. Mary's. He also left 3000 Pounds to the poor of Newry.
