= Turze, Pyrzyce County =

Turze
- Village
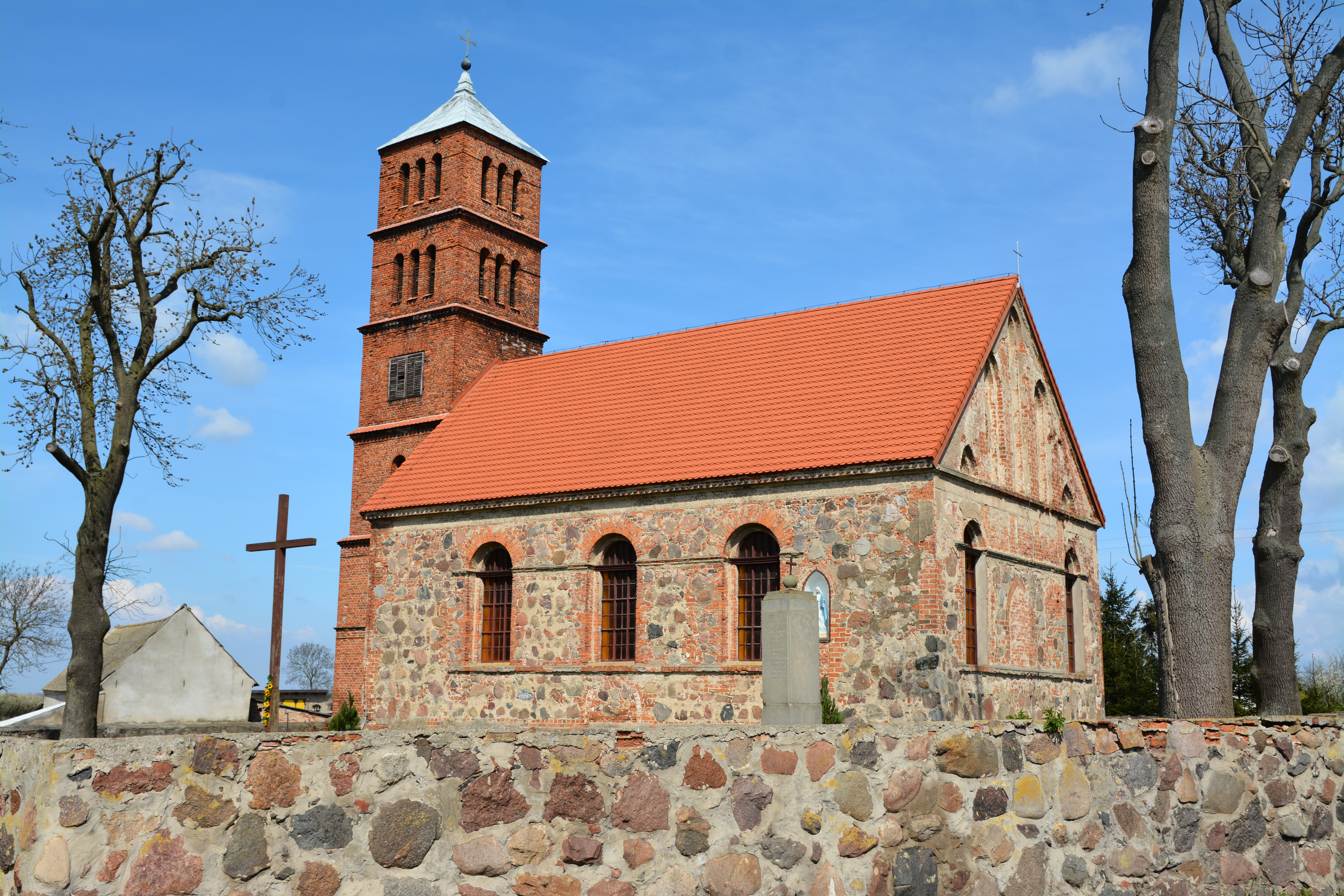

- Location within Poland
- Coordinates: 53°12′07″N 14°53′02″E
- Country: Poland
- Voivodeship: West Pomeranian
- County: Pyrzyce
- Gmina: Pyrzyce

Population
  - Total: 312

Turze [ˈtuʐɛ] (formerly German: Horst) is a village in the administrative district of Gmina Pyrzyce, within Pyrzyce County, West Pomeranian Voivodeship, in north-western Poland.

For the history of the region, see History of Pomerania.

The village has a population of 312.
