= Giżyn, Pyrzyce County =

Giżyn
- Village
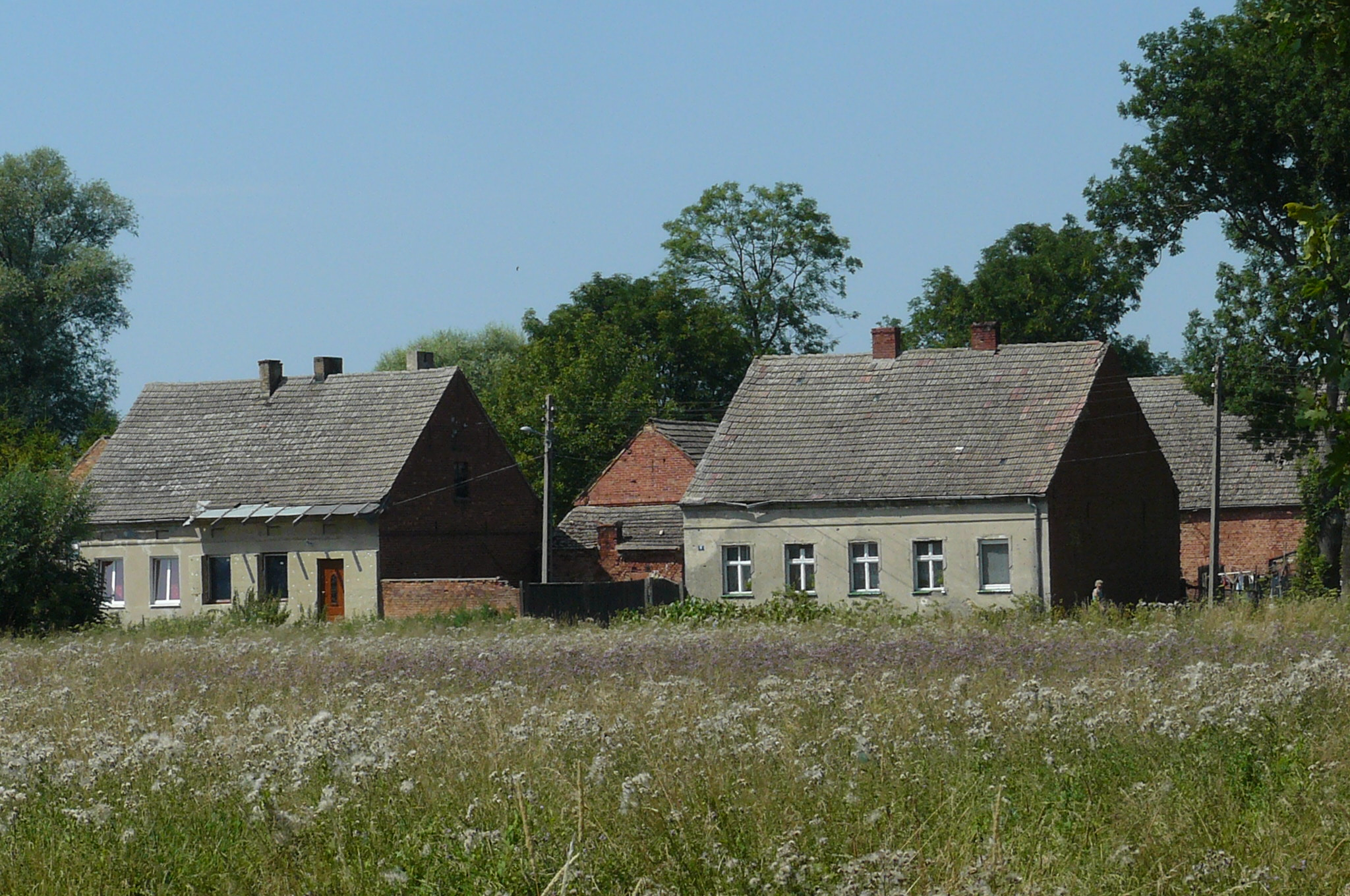
- Houses in the village

- Coat of arms

- Location within Poland
- Coordinates: 53°13′54″N 14°50′34″E
- Country: Poland
- Voivodeship: West Pomeranian
- County: Pyrzyce
- Gmina: Pyrzyce
- Population: 207

Giżyn [ˈɡiʐɨn] is a village in the administrative district of Gmina Pyrzyce, within Pyrzyce County, West Pomeranian Voivodeship, in north-western Poland.

For the history of the region, see History of Pomerania.

The village has a population of 207.
