= Czernice, Pyrzyce County =

Czernice
- Village
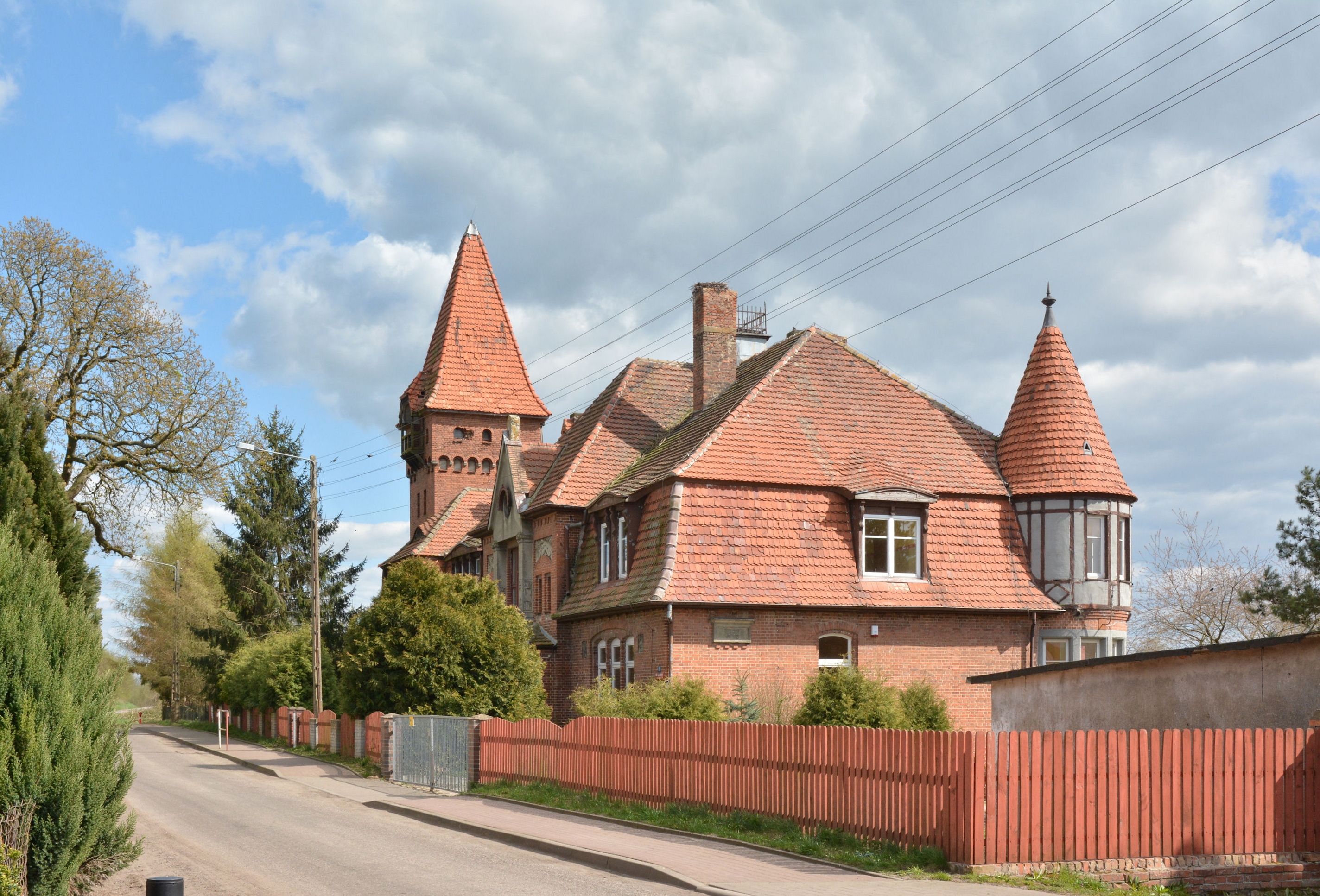
- Manor in Czernice

- Location within Poland
- Coordinates: 53°12′24″N 14°57′07″E
- Country: Poland
- Voivodeship: West Pomeranian
- County: Pyrzyce
- Gmina: Pyrzyce

Czernice [t͡ʂɛrˈnit͡sɛ] (German: Sehmsdorf) is a village in the administrative district of Gmina Pyrzyce, within Pyrzyce County, West Pomeranian Voivodeship, in north-western Poland.

== See also ==
- History of Pomerania
