= Młyny, West Pomeranian Voivodeship =

Młyny
- Village
- Location within Poland
- Coordinates: 53°12′01″N 14°51′26″E
- Country: Poland
- Voivodeship: West Pomeranian
- County: Pyrzyce
- Gmina: Pyrzyce
- Population: 117

Młyny [ˈmwɨnɨ] (formerly German: Möllendorf) is a village in the administrative district of Gmina Pyrzyce, within Pyrzyce County, West Pomeranian Voivodeship, in north-western Poland.

For the history of the region, see History of Pomerania.

The village has a population of 117.
