= Pyrzyce =

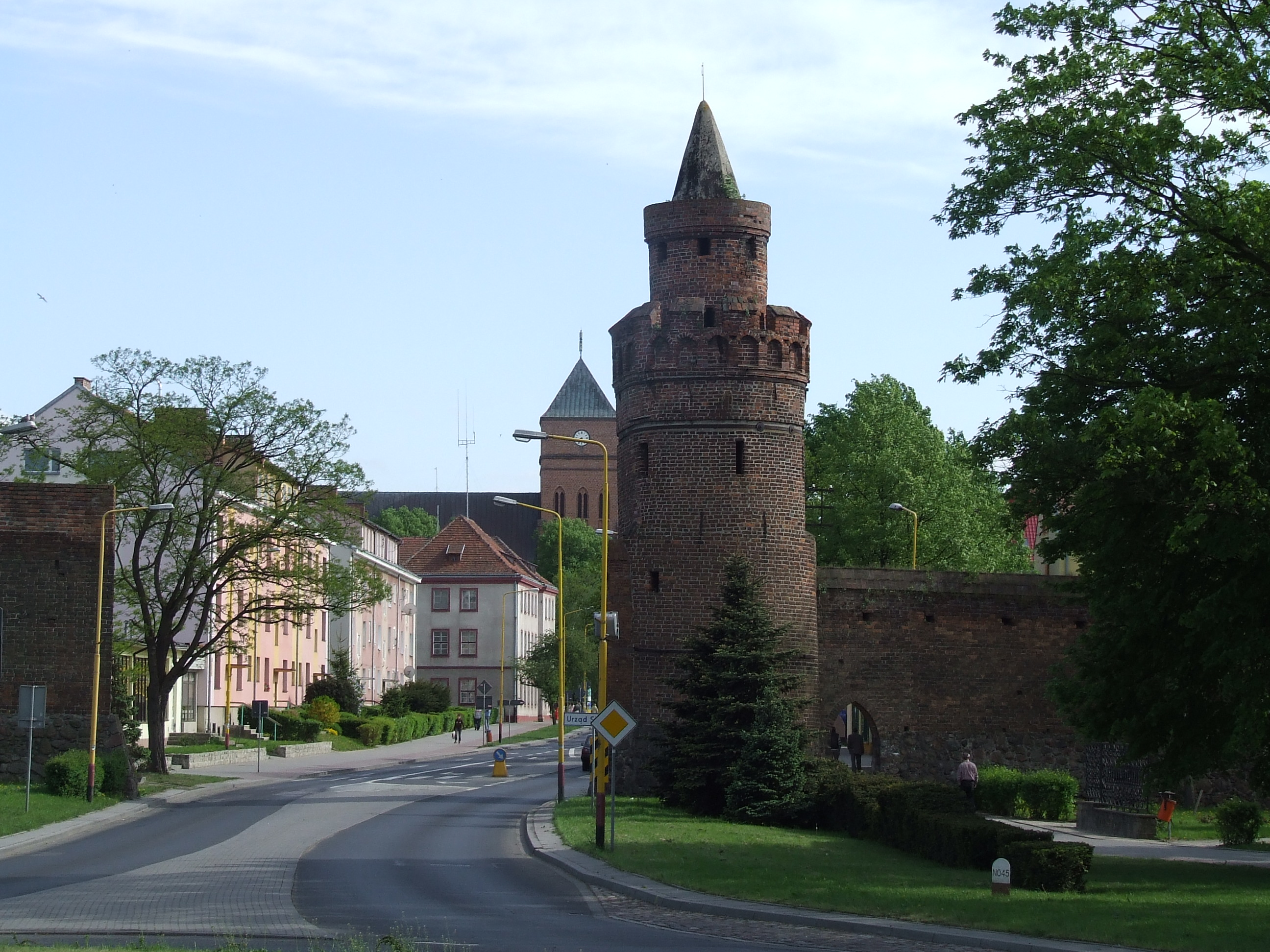
- Medieval defensive walls and Baszta Sowia (Owl Tower) with the Saint Maurice and the Assumption of Mary church in background

- Flag Coat of arms

- Location within Poland
- Coordinates: 53°8′N 14°53′E
- Country: Poland
- Voivodeship: West Pomeranian Voivodeship
- County: Pyrzyce
- Gmina: Pyrzyce
- Town rights: 1263

Government
  - Mayor: Marzena Podzińska

Area
  - Total: 39 km^{2} (15 sq mi)

Population (2007)
  - Total: 13,331
  - Density: 340/km^{2} (890/sq mi)
- Time zone: UTC+1 (CET)
  - Summer (DST): UTC+2 (CEST)
- Postal code: 74-200
- Car plates: ZPY
- Website: https://www.pyrzyce.um.gov.pl

Pyrzyce [pɨˈʐɨt͡sɛ] (Kashubian: Përzëca; German: Pyritz) is a town in Pomerania, north-western Poland. As of 2007, it had 13,331 inhabitants. It is the capital of the Pyrzyce County in West Pomeranian Voivodeship.

The town emerged from an early medieval tribal stronghold, which eventually became a castellan seat and a center of grain trade. Pyrzyce has largely preserved medieval defensive walls with several gates and towers, several medieval churches and a regional museum. It hosts one of the oldest geothermal plants in Poland.

== History ==
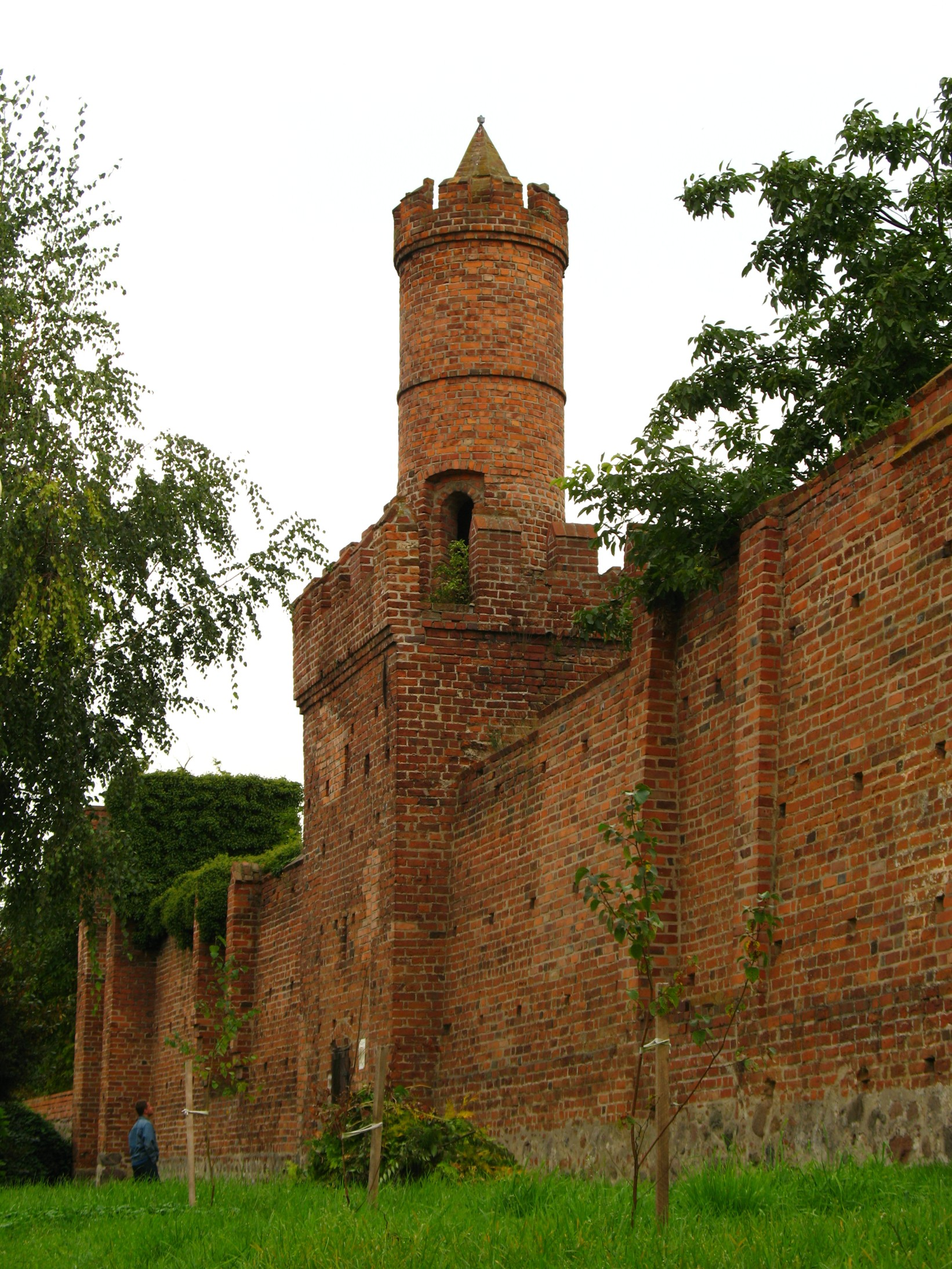
Medieval town walls

An anonymous medieval document from around 850, the Bavarian Geographer, mentions the tribe of Prissani having 70 strongholds (Prissani civitates LXX). The territory became part of the emerging Polish state under Mieszko I around 967.

The settlement was first mentioned in 1124 by bishop Otto von Bamberg, who baptized the first Pomeranians here, as part of a mission entrusted to him by Polish monarch Bolesław III Wrymouth. It was among the first towns in Western Pomerania to convert to Christianity. In 1140, a church was founded, and a castle is first mentioned.

During the fragmentation of Poland, Pyrzyce became part of the Duchy of Pomerania. The town gradually developed, with a new layout established around 1240 including two parallel main streets and fortifications mentioned by 1301. In 1248, a ducal mint of Barnim I was mentioned for the first time. In 1250, the church of St. Mauritius was consecrated. An Augustinian cloister was founded in 1256 and a Franciscan monastery in 1281.

In 1263, the town received Magdeburg town rights from Duke Barnim I. By this time, the previous Slavic settlement had become known as Altstadt.

In 1320, Dukes Otto I and Barnim III exempted the burghers from customs duties throughout their duchy; in 1322 they granted the town the village of Czarnowo, and in 1326 they confirmed the right to mint coins. By the Contract of Pyritz of 1493, the Dukes of Pomerania recognized the succession rights of the House of Brandenburg. A large fire destroyed most of the town in 1496. Pyrzyce was the first town in Pomerania to implement the Lutheran Reformation in 1524.

During the Thirty Years' War, the town was repeatedly occupied, first by the Imperial Army from 1628, then by Sweden from 1630, again by Imperial forces in 1635, and by Sweden in 1636. It suffered repeated plundering and was largely destroyed by fire in 1634. After the death of the last Pomeranian Duke in 1637, Swedish forces took control. In 1653, following the Peace of Westphalia and the Treaty of Stettin (1653), Pyrzyce became part of the Brandenburg-Prussian province of Pomerania along with the rest of Farther Pomerania.

In 1818, Pyrzyce became the seat of the district administration (Kreis Pyritz) and was connected to the railway in 1882. As part of Prussia, it was incorporated into unified Imperial Germany in 1871.

During World War II, two forced labour subcamps of Stalag II-D were operated in the town for Allied POWs. At the end of the war, the Red Army captured the town during the Pomeranian Offensive. Soviet artillery bombardment in February 1945 destroyed much of the old town.

Following the post-war boundary changes, Pyrzyce was restored to Poland. The local population was expelled in accordance with the Potsdam Agreement and replaced by Poles, including those displaced from former eastern Poland annexed by the Soviet Union.

From 1975 to 1998, Pyrzyce was part of the Szczecin Voivodeship.

== Economy ==
Since 1994 the town of Pyrzyce is home for the second oldest Geothermal Plant in Poland. The power plant is generating clean geothermal energy thanks to use of Lower Jurassic reservoirs of thermal waters (61 degree Celsius) at approx. 1600 m b.s.l.

== Demographics ==
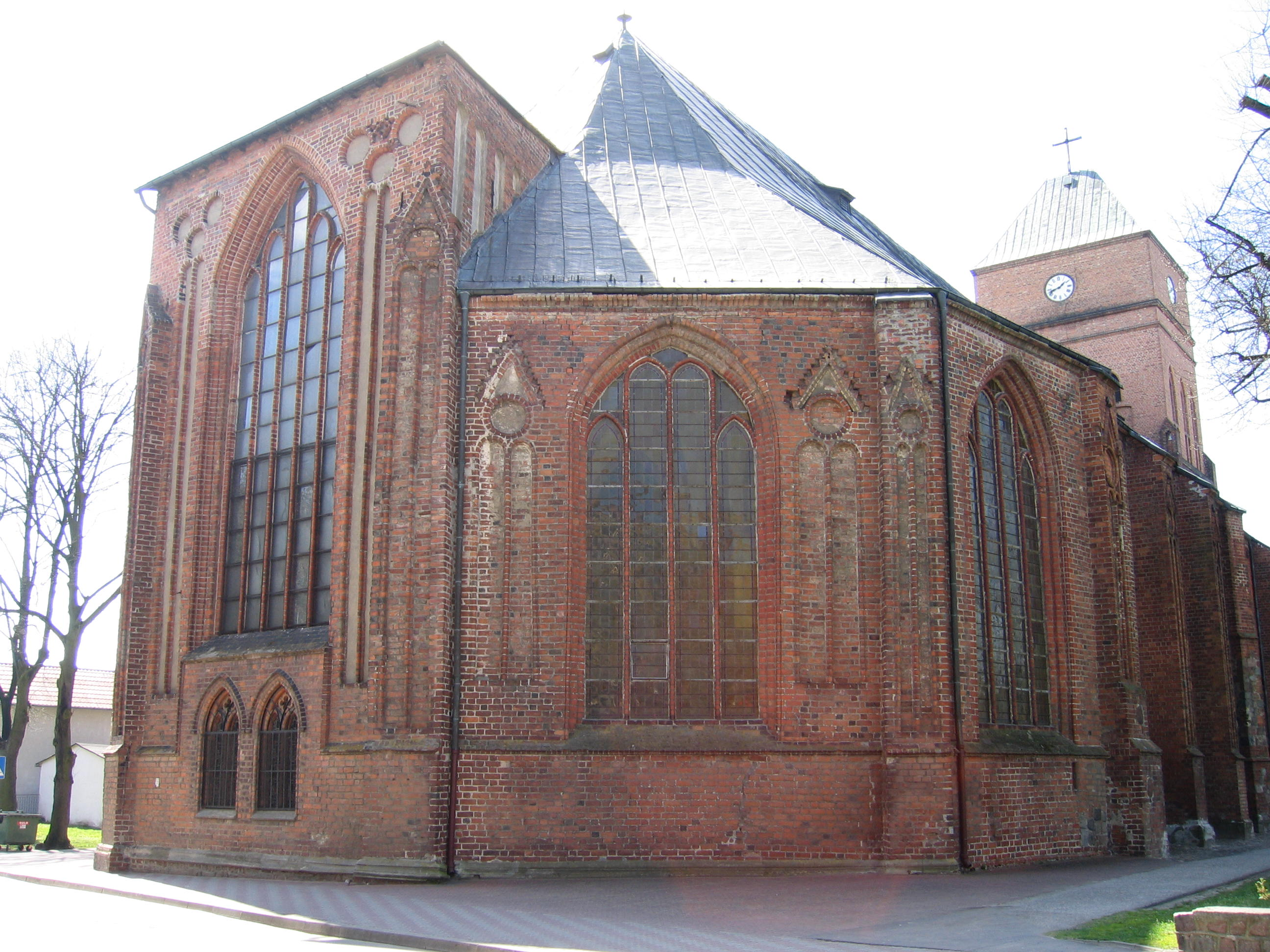
Saint Maurice and the Assumption of Mary church

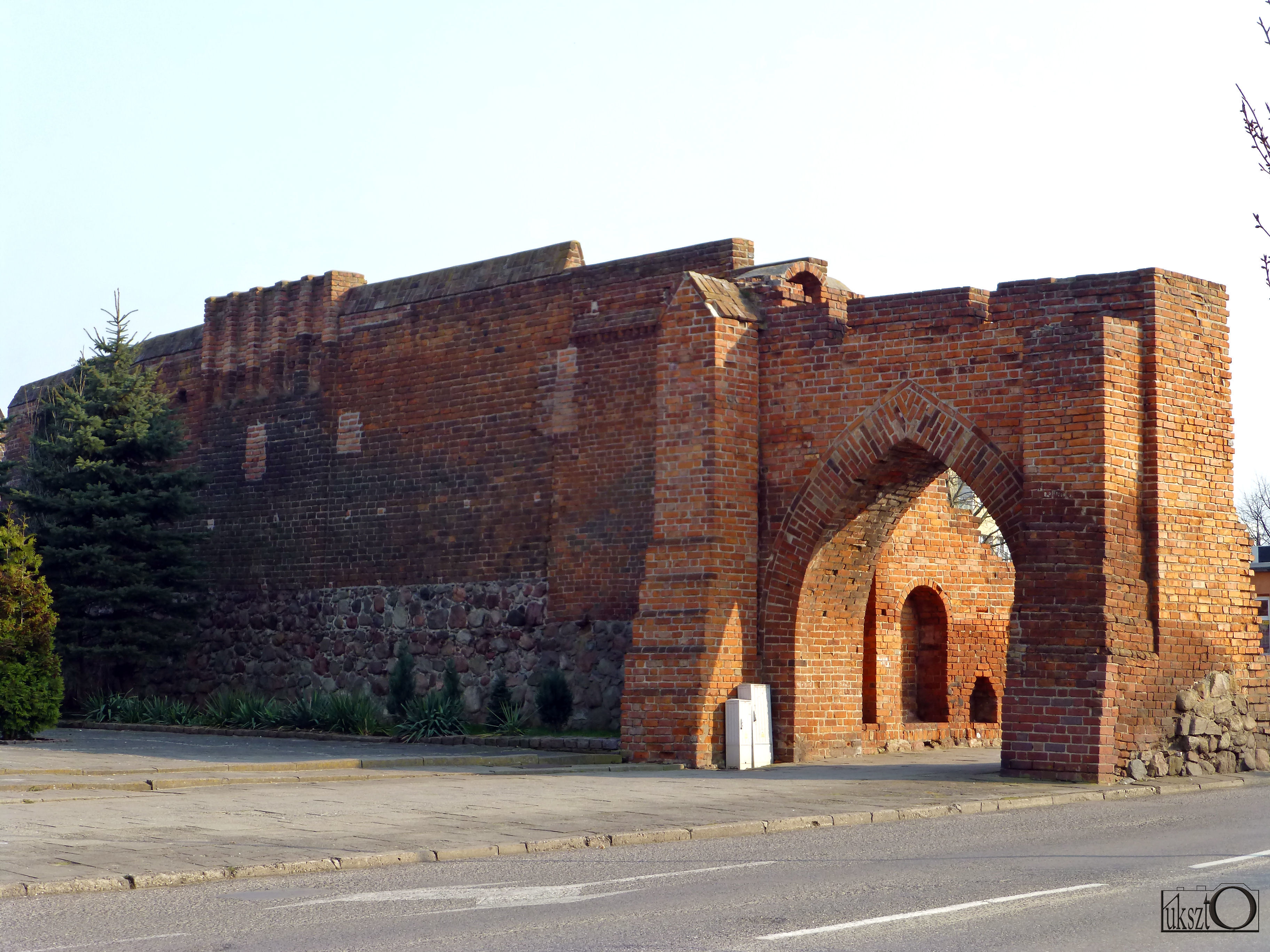
Town walls with the Szczecin Gate

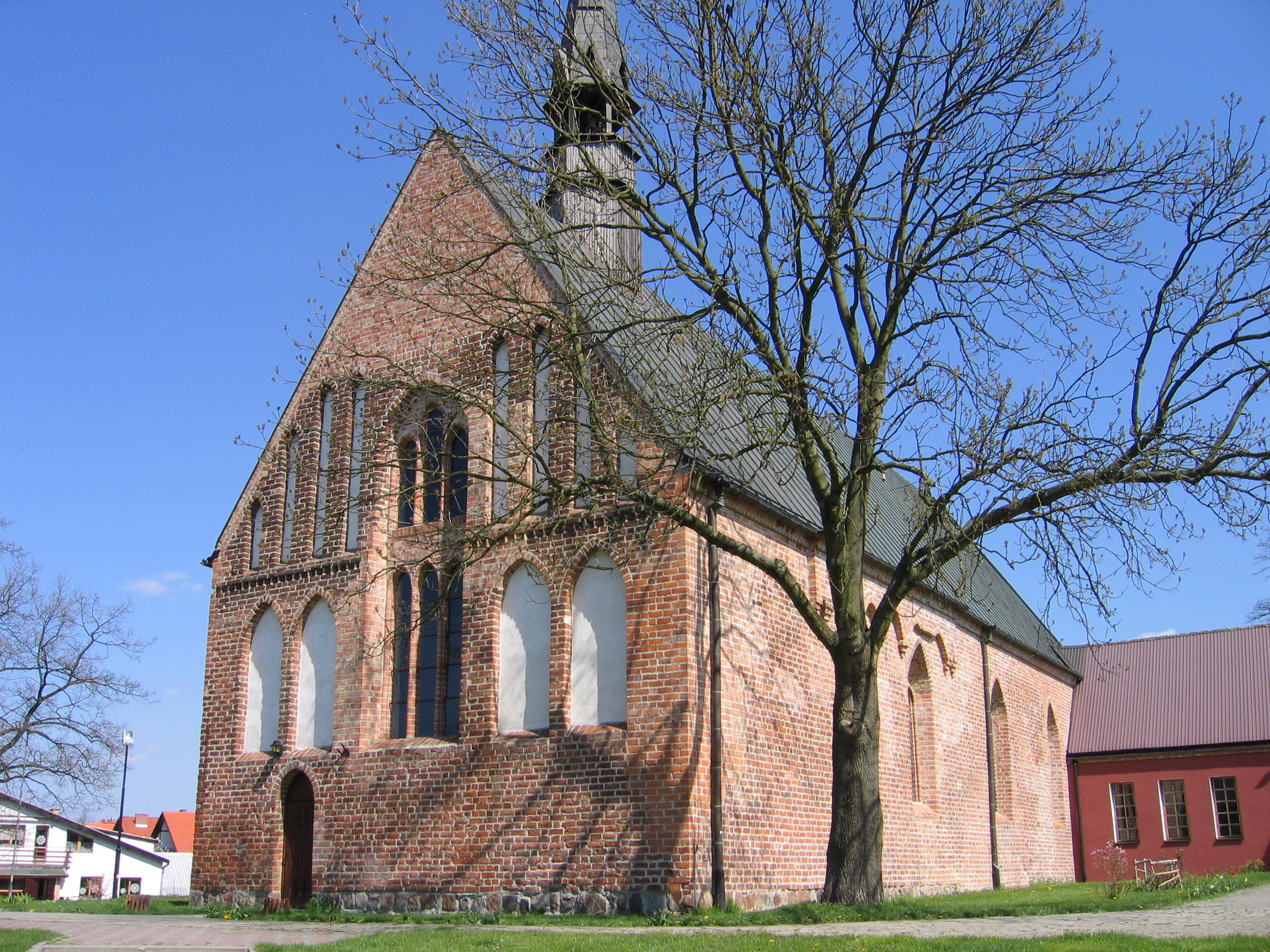
Our Lady of Sorrows church

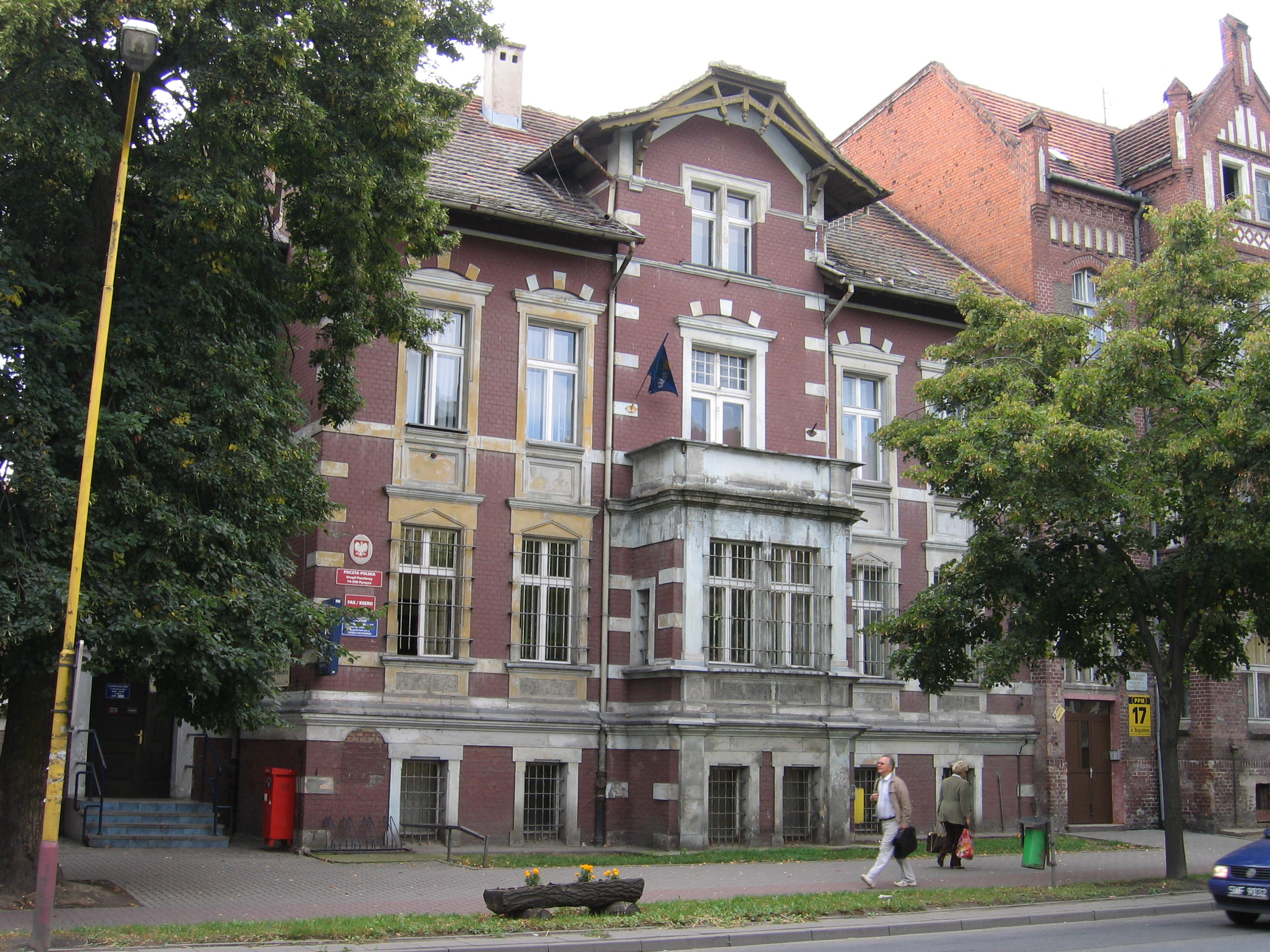
Post office

Historical population

Year	Pop.	±%
1740	2,095	—
1782	2,122	+1.3%
1791	2,323	+9.5%
1794	2,325	+0.1%
1812	2,855	+22.8%
1816	3,126	+9.5%
1831	4,151	+32.8%
1843	4,704	+13.3%
1852	5,795	+23.2%
1861	6,501	+12.2%
1875	7,442	+14.5%

Year	Pop.	±%
1880	8,123	+9.2%
1890	8,247	+1.5%
1905	8,600	+4.3%
1925	9,085	+5.6%
1933	10,084	+11.0%
1939	11,287	+11.9%
1960	5,515	−51.1%
1970	8,800	+59.6%
1980	11,600	+31.8%
2000	13,200	+13.8%
2007	13,331	+1.0%

== Notable people ==
- Sir Trevor Corry (1724–1780), British diplomat, died in Pyritz
- Karl Gützlaff (1803–1851), a German Lutheran missionary to the Far East
- Salomon Neumann (1819–1908), surgeon and founder of "Hochschule für die Wissenschaft des Judentums" (Berlin)
- Gustav Hirschfeld (1847–1895), a German classical archaeologist
- Otto Gerstenberg (1848-1935), a German businessman, mathematician and art collector
- Otto Hintze (1861–1940), a German historian of public administration
- Emil Holtz (1873–unknown), a German schoolteacher and Nazi Party official
- Margarete Neumann (1917–2002), a German writer and lyrical poet
- Danuta Bartoszek (born 1961), a former long-distance runner; competed for Canada at the 1996 Summer Olympics
- Stanisław Kulik (1959-2022), a Polish businessman, one of the founding fathers and a Managing Director of Geotermia Pyrzyce, second oldest Geothermal Plant in Poland;
- Paweł Januszewski (born 1972), a retired hurdler, represented Poland in the 1996 and 2000 Summer Olympics
- Magda Toeters (born 1986), a Dutch swimmer, won silver at the 2012 Summer Paralympics

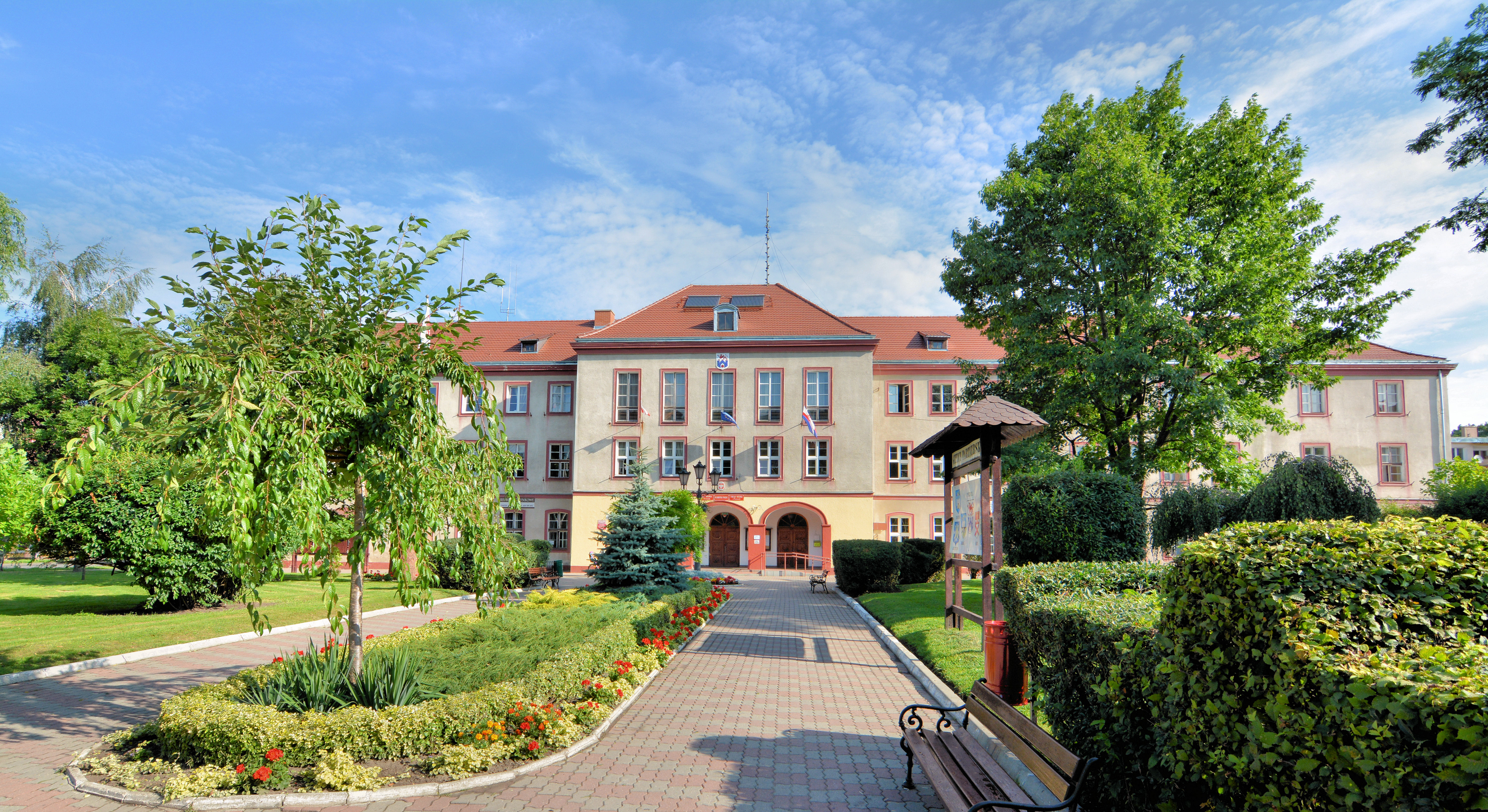
Town Hall

== Twin towns ==
Bad Sülze, Germany; Goleniów, Poland	Hörby, Sweden; Korbach, Germany	Vysoké Mýto, Czech Republic; Złocieniec, Poland
