= Battle of Strauchův dvůr =

- Part of the Hussite Wars
Date	4 August 1423
Location	Strauchův dvůr, near Hradec Králové, Bohemia
Result	Orebite victory

Belligerents
Orebites	Prague towns (Prague Union)

Commanders and leaders
Jan Žižka	Diviš Bořek of Miletínek

Strength
3,000 men	4,000 men

Casualties and losses
Unknown	Heavy losses; approximately 200 captured

The Battle of Strauchův dvůr took place on 4 August 1423 near Hradec Králové, probably in the area of the present-day Kukleny district. The army of the Eastern Bohemian Hussite Union, led by the blind commander Jan Žižka, defeated an army composed of members of the Prague Union of towns, commanded by Žižka's former ally Diviš Bořek of Miletínek.

It was the first time in the Hussite Wars that two opposing Hussite armies fought against each other. As one chronicler put it, it was the first occasion on which one sacred ark had fought against another.

== Prelude ==
At the beginning of 1423, for reasons that remain unclear, the blind commander Jan Žižka broke from several leaders of the Tábor community and moved his activities to eastern Bohemia. In mid-June, he took advantage of the absence of the Prague army, which was campaigning in Moravia, and captured Hradec Králové in cooperation with the radical priest Ambrož of Hradec Králové.

The city formally fell under the supreme command of Diviš Bořek of Miletínek, the commander of the eastern Bohemian towns belonging to the Prague Union. Until recently, this nobleman had conducted military operations alongside Žižka in the region of Nový Bydžov, where they defeated the forces of Čeněk of Wartenberg at the Battle of Hořice in April.

In Hradec Králové, Žižka's new brotherhood acquired its first urban base. Jaroměř and Dvůr Králové nad Labem soon joined it as well. When the Prague forces learned that they had lost one of their principal bases of power, they abandoned their campaign in Moravia and returned to Bohemia under Diviš Bořek of Miletínek, Hašek of Valdštejn and Hynek of Kolštejn.

Near Kunětická Hora, they joined forces with troops commanded by Puška of Kunštát, the captain of Nymburk, and Hynek Krušina of Lichtenburg. These forces had been summoned by the newly elected Prague town council. The combined army then marched towards Hradec Králové.

== Battle ==
Žižka was well informed about the movements of his opponents and decided to confront them in open terrain near the walls of Hradec Králové.

Although the historical sources identify the location of the battle only approximately, it probably took place on a low hill near the Strauch (or Strach) farmstead. The Hradec Králové historian Jaroslav Šůla placed it in the western part of the present-day Kukleny district.

Relatively few historical sources describe the battle itself. Most of the information is found in the work published by the historian František Palacký under the collective title Old Czech Annals (Staré letopisy české). The Catholic soldier Bartošek of Drahonice also briefly mentioned the engagement.

The Old Czech Annals recount the battle as follows:

And Brother Žižka, together with the people of Hradec, marched out of the city against them, and a battle took place between the two sides at Strach's Court. One sacred ark fought against another. The people of Prague fled, having been defeated by Žižka in the field, and many men were beaten down; about two hundred were taken prisoner. Diviš fled with his men to the Mountain. And Žižka killed with his mace the priest who carried the ark on the Prague side. This took place on the Wednesday before Saint Lawrence's Day.

— Old Czech Annals

A similar account appears in manuscript B of the Old Czech Annals:

In the same year, Lord Diviš, having returned from Moravia, took the people of Prague with him and marched towards Hradec. Brother Žižka marched out of the city against him, and a battle took place at Strach's Court. One sacred ark fought against another. Žižka killed with his mace the priest who carried the sacred ark on the Prague side, while Diviš and his men fled to the Mountain and the others ran away. This took place on the Wednesday before Saint Lawrence's Day.

— Old Czech Annals, manuscript B

Manuscript S of the same chronicle provides a further account:

In the same year, Lord Diviš and the people of Prague arrived at Hradec, and Žižka marched out of the city with the community against them. A battle took place that day before Saint Lawrence's Day at Strach's Court. Many people of Prague were killed, and Žižka killed with his mace the Prague priest who carried the Body of Christ. Two hundred prisoners were brought to the town. The spoils were gathered in one house, but some people stole from them before one another. The remainder of the booty, which was left after the theft, was brought out into the town square and burned.

— Old Czech Annals, manuscript S

Bartošek of Drahonice gives a different date, writing that Žižka defeated the people of Prague near Hradec with his warriors around the feast of Corpus Christi in 1420.

On the basis of these accounts, it can be assumed that Žižka positioned his wagon fort in such a way as to block the approaches to Hradec Králové from both Kunětická Hora and Prague. The precise course of the battle can only be reconstructed tentatively. It is nevertheless clear that the Prague army suffered a major defeat, in which the defenders of Hradec captured substantial booty and approximately two hundred prisoners.

An interesting detail, which historians have interpreted in different ways, is the statement that Žižka killed the Prague priest carrying the sacred ark, a container holding a consecrated host that Hussites carried into battle.

This information has been interpreted as a possible indication that Žižka retained at least a small amount of vision after being wounded during the siege of Rabí Castle. He may have possessed a form of residual sight that allowed him to perceive outlines at a distance of a few metres.

== Aftermath ==
After the battle, the defeated army dispersed in several directions. Diviš Bořek of Miletínek fled to Kunětická Hora Castle, while Hašek of Valdštejn probably headed towards Kolín.

Žižka immediately took advantage of the favourable strategic situation and captured the town of Čáslav, where a coup similar to the one in Hradec Králové had probably been prepared.

In the following days, he advanced towards Kutná Hora, where on 13 August he installed a town council selected by lot. He then returned to Čáslav, which was soon besieged by the reorganised Prague forces. Their operation was unsuccessful, and after several days of skirmishing they withdrew towards Kutná Hora.

Although the city was subsequently brought under their control, its loss was not particularly significant for the eastern Bohemian Hussites. Ultimately, by making effective use of his victory at Strauchův dvůr, Jan Žižka managed to expand the ranks of his union sufficiently to undertake an expedition into Moravia in the following months.
