= Urbanice =

Urbanice may refer to places:

== Czech Republic ==
- Urbanice (Hradec Králové District), a municipality and village in the Hradec Králové Region
- Urbanice (Pardubice District), a municipality and village in the Pardubice Region

== Poland ==
- Urbanice, Poland, a village
