= Magdalena Stysiak =

Polish volleyball player

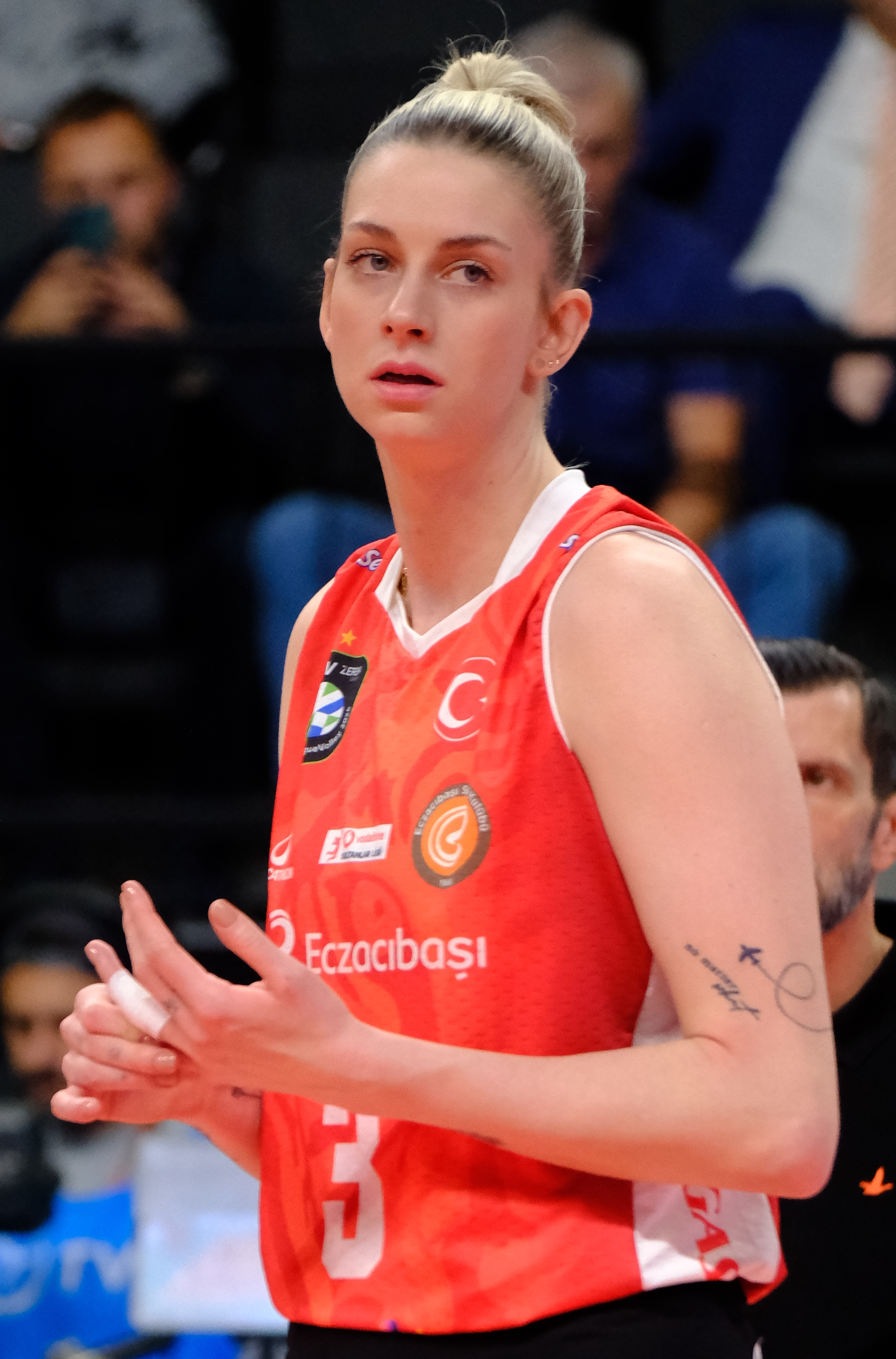
- Stysiak in 2025

Personal information
- Nationality: Polish
- Born: 3 December 2000 (age 25); Turów, Poland
- Height: 2.03 m (6 ft 8 in)
- Weight: 85 kg (187 lb)
- Spike: 312 cm (123 in)
- Block: 295 cm (116 in)

Volleyball information
- Position: Opposite spiker
- Current club: Osasco
- Number: 9 (national team), 3 (club)

Career
Years	Teams
2015–2016	(Poland) SMS PZPS Szczyrk
2016–2017	(Poland) Chemik Police (Młoda Liga)
2017–2018	(Poland) PSPS SMS Police
2018–2019	(Poland) Chemik Police
2019	(Poland) Grot Budowlani Łódź
2019–2021	(Italy) Savino del Bene Scandicci
2021–2023	(Italy) Vero Volley Milano
2023–2025	(Turkey) Fenerbahçe
2025–2026	(Turkey) Eczacıbaşı
2026–	(Brazil) Osasco

National team
2015–	Poland
Honours
Women's volleyball
Representing Poland
FIVB Nations League
Bronze medal – third place	2023 Arlington	Team
Bronze medal – third place	2024 Bangkok	Team
Bronze medal – third place	2025 Łódź	Team

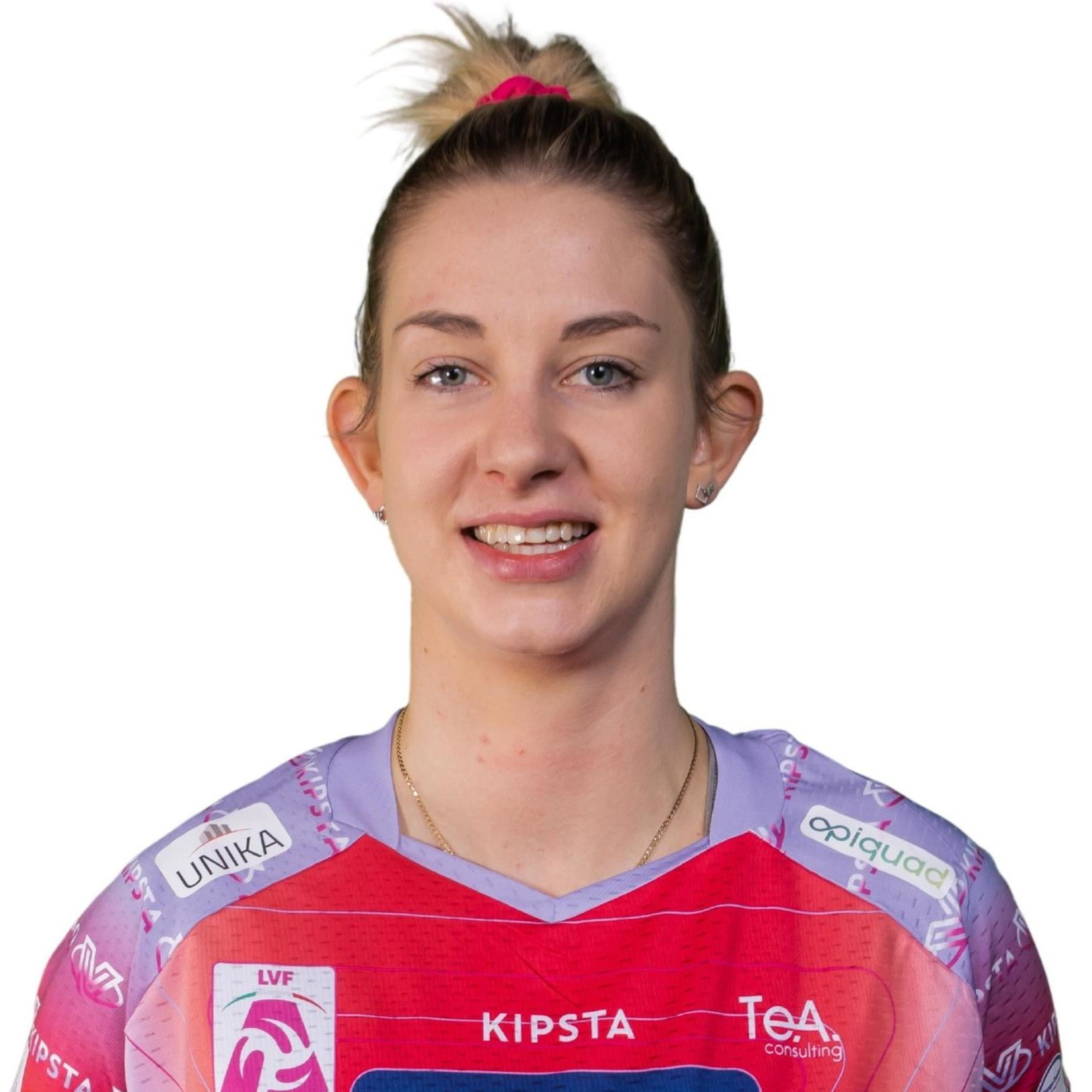
Stysiak in 2022

Magdalena Stysiak (Polish: [maɡdaˈlɛna ˈstɨɕak]; born 3 December 2000) is a Polish professional volleyball player. She is a part of the Poland women's national volleyball team. At the club level she currently plays for Osasco.

== Personal life ==
Stysiak was born in the village of Turów, Poland. Growing up she was always into sports, playing soccer as a child, She was introduced to volleyball by her older brother Tomasz. Her father built a volleyball court in the garden of their home, and soon she joined a sports club in Kurów before playing for her local team, Siatkarz Wieluń.

== Career ==
She began playing at a local team Sitrakraz Wiluen in 2014. In 2016, at the age of sixteen, she made her debut in the Polish Women's Volleyball Leuegue playing for SMS PZPS Szczyrk. In 2018, she participated at the Women's U19 Volleyball European Championship held in Albania where she won bronze medal and received the Best Opposite Spiker Award.

She participated in the 2019 Women's European Volleyball Championship, 2019 FIVB Volleyball Women's Nations League, 2022 FIVB Volleyball Women's World Championship

In 2023, she won bronze medal with the national team at the FIVB Volleyball Nations League. She repeated this result by winning bronze medal at the 2024 FIVB Volleyball Nations League, and the 2025 FIVB Volleyball Nations League.

== Awards ==
=== International ===
- 2025 FIVB Nations League – Bronze medal
- 2023 FIVB Nations League – Bronze medal
- 2024 FIVB Nations League – Bronze medal

=== Clubs ===
- 2015–16 Polish Volleyball League Champion, with Chemik Police
- 2015–16 Polish Cup Champion, with Chemik Police
- 2016–17 Polish Volleyball League Champion, with Chemik Police
- 2016–17 Polish Cup Champion, with Chemik Police
- 2018 Polish Super Cup Champion, with Grot Budowlani Łódź
- 2023–24 CEV Champions League – Bronze medal, with Fenerbahçe Opet
- 2023–24 Turkish Volleyball League – Champion, with Fenerbahçe Opet
- 2023–24 Turkish Volleyball Cup – Champion, with Fenerbahçe Opet
- 2024 Turkish Super Cup Champion, with Fenerbahçe Medicana
- 2024–25 Turkish Volleyball Cup – Champion, with Fenerbahçe Medicana

=== Individual ===
- 2018–19 Polish Volleyball League - Best server
- 2020–21 CEV Champions League - Best server
- 2023 FIVB Nations League - Best scorer
- 2023 European Championship - Best outside hitter
- 2024 World Olympic Qualification - Best scorer
