= Krajków =

Krajków may refer to the following places in Poland:

- Krajków, Lower Silesian Voivodeship (south-west Poland)
- Krajków, Łódź Voivodeship (central Poland)
- Krajków, Świętokrzyskie Voivodeship (south-central Poland)
