= Widoradz Dolny =

- Village
- Location within Poland
- Coordinates: 51°13′16″N 18°36′55″E
- Country: Poland
- Voivodeship: Łódź
- County: Wieluń
- Gmina: Wieluń

Widoradz Dolny [viˈdɔrat͡s ˈdɔlnɨ] is a village in the administrative district of Gmina Wieluń, within Wieluń County, Łódź Voivodeship, in central Poland.
