= Ambrož Hradecký =

Ambrož Hradecký (Czech: Ambrož Hradecký or Ambrož z Hradce; died 16 October 1439, in Kolín) was a Czech priest, preacher and political leader from the Kingdom of Bohemia in the era of the Hussite Wars.

== Life ==
Ambrož is first mentioned in 1419 as pastor of the Holy Spirit Cathedral in the East Bohemian town of Hradec Králové (German: Königgrätz). Queen Sofia and her burgrave had him driven out of town, because he supported the Hussite cause. In the spring of 1420, Ambrož and Diviš Bořek of Miletínka mobilized a crowd on mount Oreb and lead the crowd to Prague, which was threatened by King Sigismund, scorching and burning the area they travelled through, and destroying the monastery of Münchengrätz, ostensibly in support of the rebels.

In June the Orebites, as they called themselves, conquered Hradec Králové and Ambrož was reinstated in his parish. Under his leadership, the city turned into a center of the Hussite movement. Even Jan Zizka, the leader of the Hussites, came to Ambrož for advice about his conflicts with the Tábor. After Žižka's death, his remains were transferred to Hradec Králové and buried in the parish church. In 1433 Ambrož was appointed Archdeacon and Captain of Hradec Králové. As ambassador, he participated in the negotiations and participated in the negotiations in Basel that lead to the Compact of Prague.

After Sigismund had been elected King of Bohemia, Ambrož continued to oppose him. In 1436, Sigismund deposed Ambrož as captain and attempted to replace him with someone more loyal, sending a new captain with forces to drive the insurgents out of Hradec Králové. However, Ambrož refused to relinquish his position, and he suffered heavy losses. He refused an offer to negotiate a surrender, and continued to fight the losing battle. In 1437, with his forces depleted, Ambrož was forced to flee. He was wounded and captured, but was released after only a brief captivity. He then travelled to Kolín, where he died two years later in 1439.

Ambrož was a representative of the more moderate Hussites, who called themselves Orphans. He tolerated University Professors and he granted asylum after 1427, and protected the so-called Picards, whom he rescued from the stake. Adherence to the Catholic faith, however, he held to be a crime that should be punished by beheading.
