= Ráby =

- Municipality
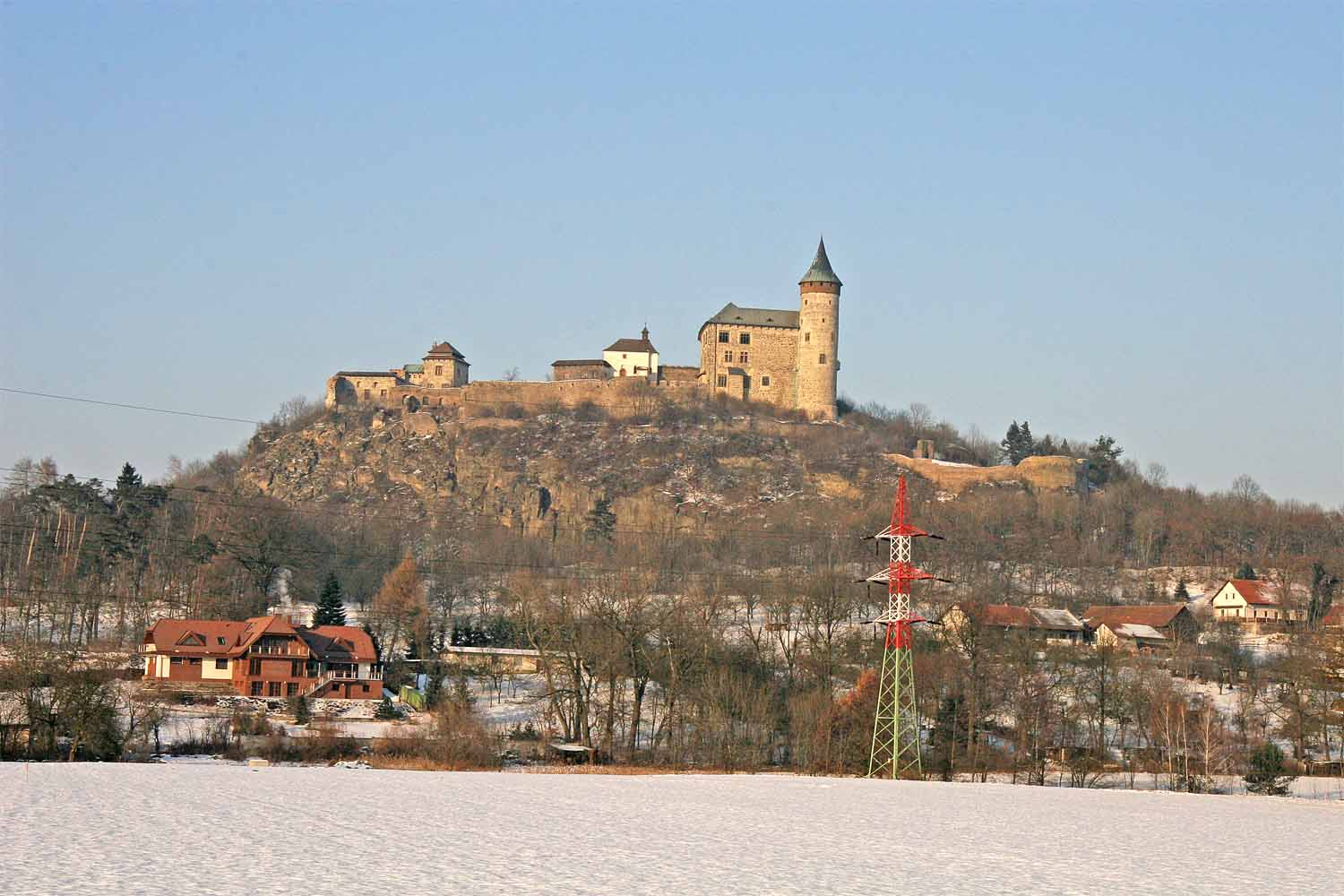
- Ráby below the Kunětice Mountain

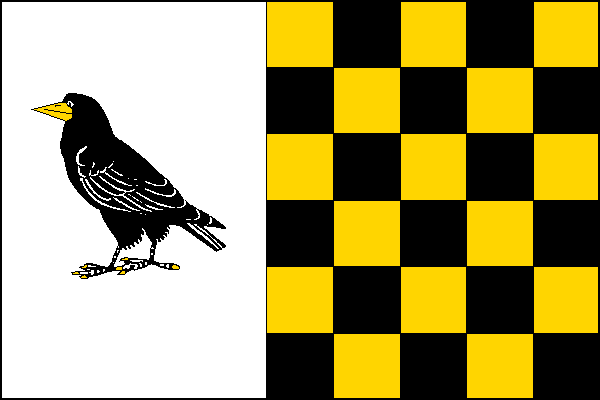
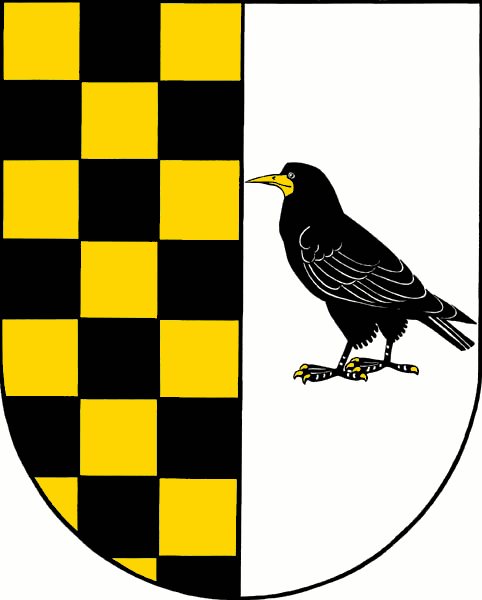
- Flag Coat of arms

- Location in the Czech Republic
- Coordinates: 50°4′22″N 15°48′9″E
- Country: Czech Republic
- Region: Pardubice
- District: Pardubice
- Founded: 1778

Area
  - Total: 2.37 km^{2} (0.92 sq mi)
- Elevation: 213 m (699 ft)

Population (2026-01-01)
  - Total: 580
  - Density: 240/km^{2} (630/sq mi)
- Time zone: UTC+1 (CET)
  - Summer (DST): UTC+2 (CEST)
- Postal code: 533 52
- Website: www.raby-obec.cz

Ráby (German: Raab) is a municipality and village in Pardubice District in the Pardubice Region of the Czech Republic. It has about 600 inhabitants.

The Kunětická hora mountain with the Kunětická hora Castle lies in the municipality.

== Demographics ==
Historical population
Year	Pop.	±%
1869	303	—
1880	330	+8.9%
1890	293	−11.2%
1900	257	−12.3%
1910	232	−9.7%
1921	243	+4.7%
1930	255	+4.9%
1950	360	+41.2%
1961	387	+7.5%
1970	345	−10.9%
1980	451	+30.7%
1991	515	+14.2%
2001	551	+7.0%
2011	581	+5.4%
2021	575	−1.0%
Source: Censuses
