= Piaski, Gmina Wieluń =

Piaski
- Village
- Location within Poland
- Coordinates: 51°13′17″N 18°26′05″E
- Country: Poland
- Voivodeship: Łódź
- County: Wieluń
- Gmina: Wieluń
- Time zone: UTC+1 (CET)
  - Summer (DST): UTC+2 (CEST)
- Postal code: 98-300
- Vehicle registration: EWI

Piaski (Polish pronunciation: [ˈpjaskʲi]) is a village in the administrative district of Gmina Wieluń, within Wieluń County, Łódź Voivodeship, in south-central Poland.
