= Kadłub, Łódź Voivodeship =

Kadłub
- Village
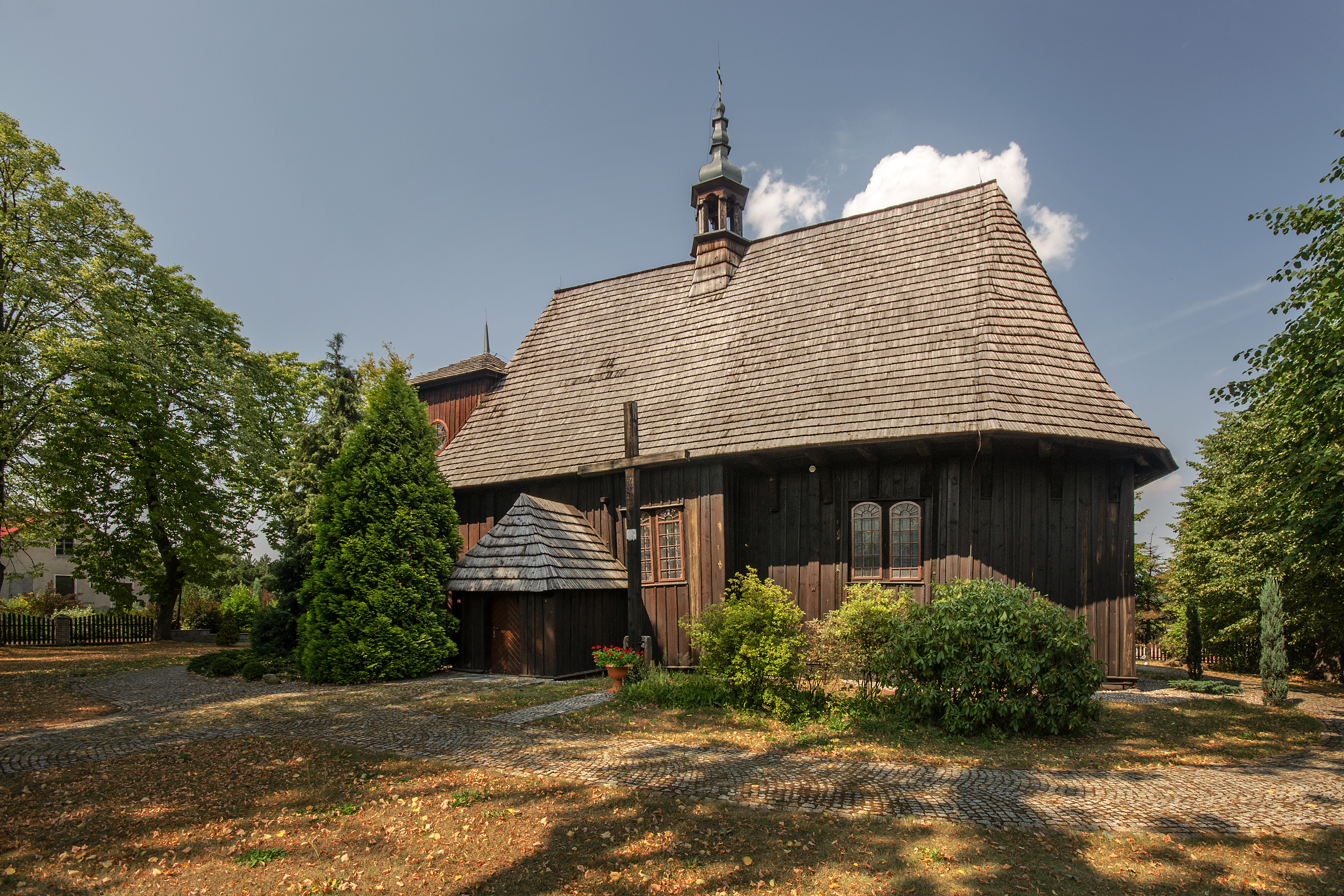
- Saint Andrew church in Kadłub

- Location within Poland
- Coordinates: 51°10′2″N 18°33′8″E
- Country: Poland
- Voivodeship: Łódź
- County: Wieluń
- Gmina: Wieluń
- Time zone: UTC+1 (CET)
  - Summer (DST): UTC+2 (CEST)
- Vehicle registration: EWI

Kadłub [ˈkadwup] is a village in the administrative district of Gmina Wieluń, within Wieluń County, Łódź Voivodeship, in south-central Poland.

== History ==
The territory became a part of the emerging Polish state in the 10th century. By the 14th century, there was a Catholic parish in the village. The parish covered Kadłub along with two nearby villages Popowice and Grębień. Kadłub was a private church village of the Archdiocese of Gniezno until 1555, and of the Gniezno Archcathedral Chapter afterwards, administratively located in the Sieradz Voivodeship in the Greater Poland Province. In 1827, Kadłub had a population of 251.

During the German occupation of Poland (World War II), in 1940, the German gendarmerie carried out expulsions of Poles, who were placed in a transit camp in Łódź, and then young Poles were deported to forced labour in Germany and German-occupied France, and others were deported to the General Government in the more eastern part of German-occupied Poland. Houses and farms of expelled Poles were handed over to German colonists as part of the Lebensraum policy. The village was renamed to Rumfeck in attempt to erase traces of Polish origin.
