= Urbanice (Hradec Králové District) =

- Municipality
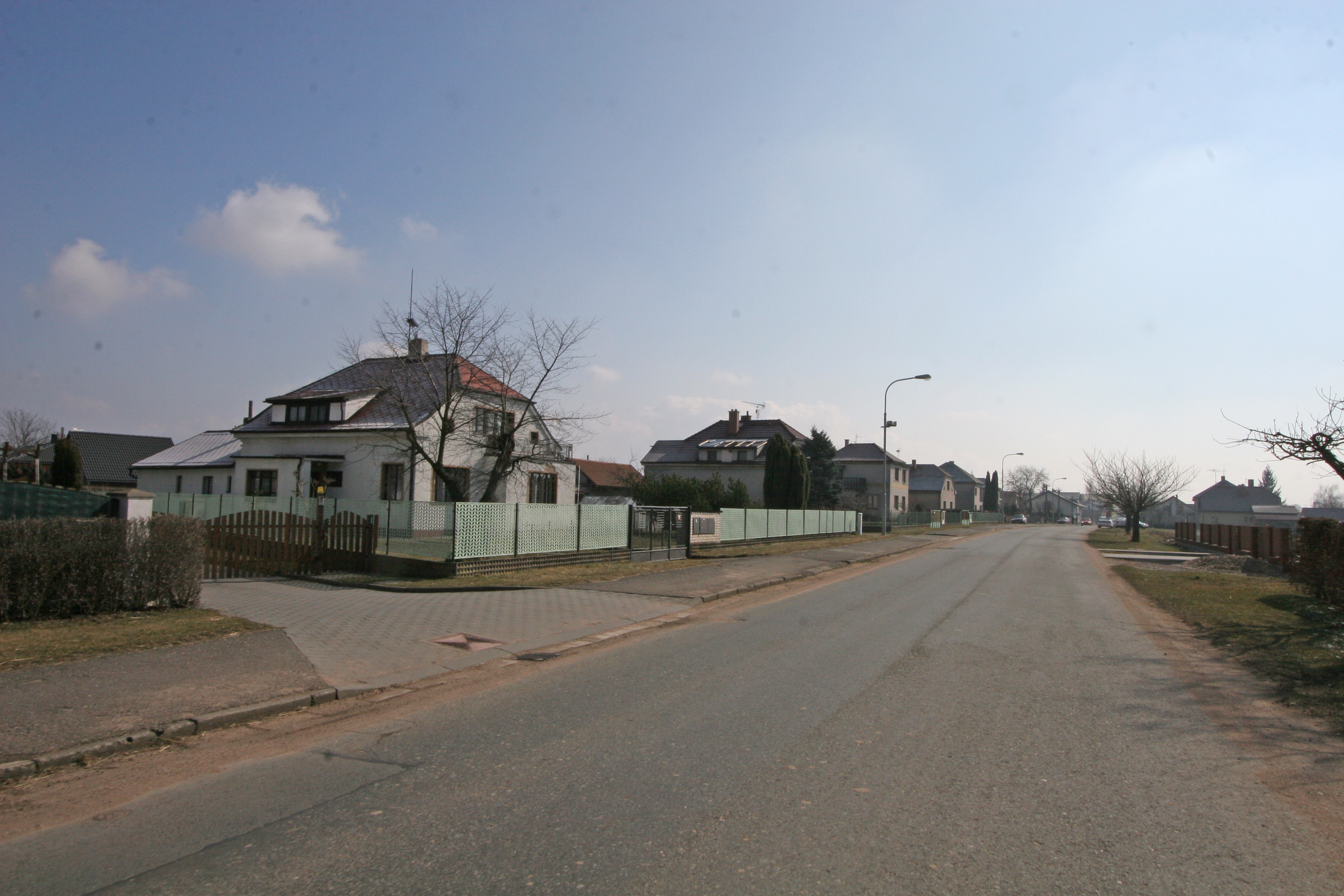
- Main street

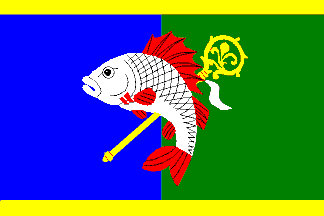
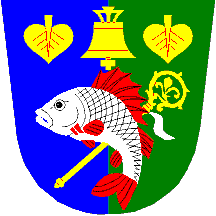
- Flag Coat of arms

- Location in the Czech Republic
- Coordinates: 50°10′48″N 15°43′39″E
- Country: Czech Republic
- Region: Hradec Králové
- District: Hradec Králové
- First mentioned: 1465

Area
  - Total: 2.25 km^{2} (0.87 sq mi)
- Elevation: 250 m (820 ft)

Population (2026-01-01)
  - Total: 320
  - Density: 140/km^{2} (370/sq mi)
- Time zone: UTC+1 (CET)
  - Summer (DST): UTC+2 (CEST)
- Postal code: 503 27
- Website: urbanice.cz

Urbanice is a municipality and village in Hradec Králové District in the Hradec Králové Region of the Czech Republic. It has about 300 inhabitants.

== Etymology ==
The name is derived from the personal name Urban, meaning "the village of Urban's people".

== Geography ==
Urbanice is located about 7 kilometres (4 mi) southwest of Hradec Králové. It lies in a flat agricultural landscape in the East Elbe Table.

== History ==
The first mention of Urbanice is in a deed of King George of Poděbrady from 1465. Originally, the village was a property of the monastery in Opatovice nad Labem, but the monastery was destroyed during the Hussite Wars, and Urbanice was acquired by the city of Hradec Králové and joined to the Kunětická hora estate.

In 1561, Urbanice was bought by the Knight Jindřich Nejedlý of Vysoká and joined to the Libčany estate. Jindřich's descendants owned the estate until 1674. In 1674, it was inherited by Myslibor Petr Straka of Nedabylice. The estate didn't change owners until 1886, when it was acquired by Count Jan Harrach. The Harrach family were the last noble owners before the municipality gained self-governance.

== Demographics ==
Historical population

Year	Pop.	±%
1869	235	—
1880	263	+11.9%
1890	271	+3.0%
1900	304	+12.2%
1910	288	−5.3%

Year	Pop.	±%
1921	276	−4.2%
1930	294	+6.5%
1950	254	−13.6%
1961	298	+17.3%
1970	277	−7.0%

Year	Pop.	±%
1980	293	+5.8%
1991	271	−7.5%
2001	307	+13.3%
2011	332	+8.1%
2021	287	−13.6%

Source: Censuses

== Transport ==
The municipality is served by the nearby train station in Praskačka, located on the railway line from Hradec Králové to Chlumec nad Cidlinou.

== Sights ==
There are no protected cultural monuments in the municipality. A monument of local importance is the cross from 1860, standing between five old linden trees. The bell tower, built in 1929, replaced the old oak trunk on which the bell, cast in 1803, was hung. There is also a statue of the Virgin Mary from 1908.
