= Masłowice, Wieluń County =

Masłowice
- Village
- Location within Poland
- Coordinates: 51°15′N 18°38′E
- Country: Poland
- Voivodeship: Łódź
- County: Wieluń
- Gmina: Wieluń

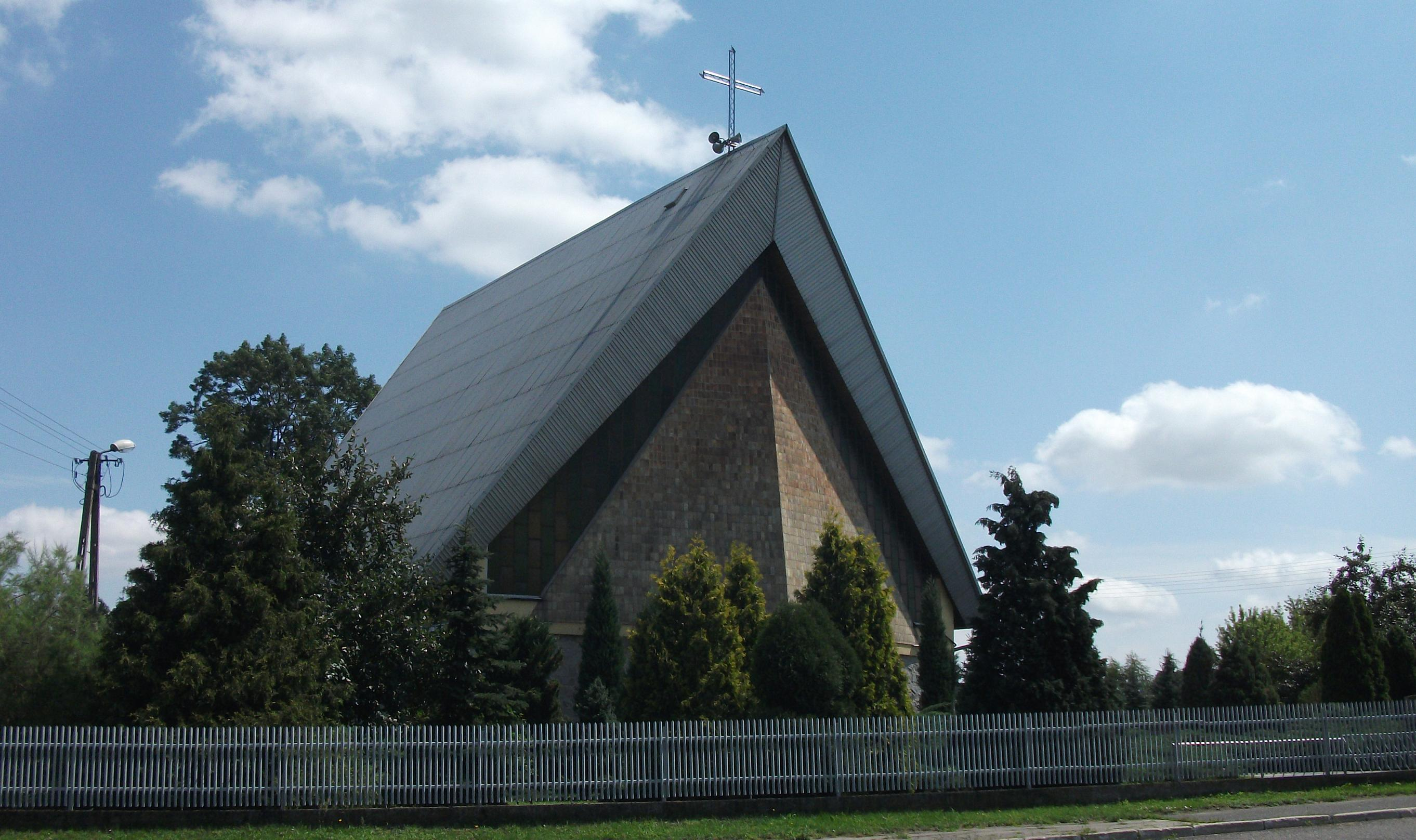
Church in Masłowice

Masłowice [maswɔˈvit͡sɛ] is a village in the administrative district of Gmina Wieluń, within Wieluń County, Łódź Voivodeship, in central Poland.
