= Klusiny =

- Village
- Location within Poland
- Coordinates: 51°14′59″N 18°41′38″E
- Country: Poland
- Voivodeship: Łódź
- County: Wieluń
- Gmina: Wieluń

Klusiny [kluˈɕinɨ] is a village in the administrative district of Gmina Wieluń, within Wieluń County, Łódź Voivodeship, in central Poland.
