= Diviš Bořek of Miletínek =

Captain of the Hussites

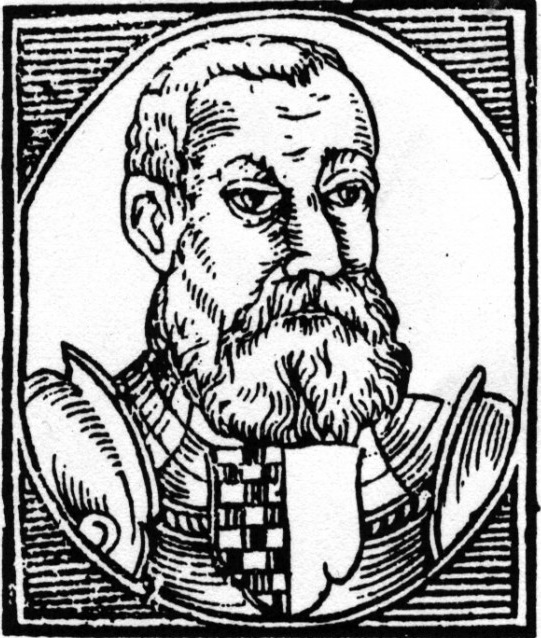
- Born: c. 1360s Bohdaneč, Kingdom of Bohemia
- Died: 8 January 1438
- Military career
- Rank: Captain
- Conflicts: Hussite Wars

Diviš Bořek of Miletínek (Czech: Diviš Bořek z Miletínka, German: Diwisch Borek von Miletin; cca 1360s – 8 January 1438) was a Czech Knight and captain of the Hussites in eastern and central Bohemia.

== Life ==
Diviš Bořek started his career as a poor, rural nobleman of Czech origin, seated at small stronghold named Miletínek, near the village Miletín in northeastern Bohemia. After Jan Hus had been burned at the stake in Constance (1415), he joined the Hussite movement. At first, he was a leader of the more radical Hussites and a comrade of Jan Žižka; later he became more moderate and even fought against the Taborites.

In 1420, Diviš and priest Ambrož Hradecký conquered Hradec Králové, the most important city in eastern Bohemia. It allowed him in following year to conquer and loot nearby Benedictine monastery at Opatovice nad Labem and subsequently the very same fate prepared for the Cistercian convent in Sezemice. He confiscated their properties which made him suddenly a rich man. In 1423, he founded a small castle on the hill Kunětická hora (82 m above ground), near the city of Pardubice; this castle he named Kunětická hora Castle.

In June and July 1423 he and captain Bedřich of Strážnice led a campaign to Moravia, in which they defeated the armies of Jan XII Železný ("the Iron"), Bishop of Olomouc and the Duke Přemek I of Opava. After its return to Bohemia, the Hussite armies were attacked near Hradec Králové by the armies of Jan Žižka, whom they had regarded as fellow Hussites. Jan Žižka defeated them and took the abundant prey they had conquered in Moravia.

In subsequent years, he led campaigns of conquest to eastern Bohemia and became a captain in the towns Pardubice and Litomyšl. In 1427 he supported as a captain of Kolín the moderate Utraquists and hosted the delegation, who at this meeting decided the attack Prague. This plan was betrayed and the army was massacred. In return, Prokop the Great led his army to Kolín and besieged it. Diviš could keep up the defense of the city for three months, until town's paupers, which sympathized with the radical Hussites, forced him to surrender. Diviš agreed with the besiegers on the surrender of the town in return for free passage.

In later years he was one of the leaders of the moderate Hussites and stood in the forefront of the combined armies of the Utraquists and the Catholics loyal to King Sigismund of Luxembourg. This coalition defeated in the decisive Battle of Lipany (30 May 1434) joined armies of the Sirotci (Orphans) and Taborites which meant the definitive end of the Hussite Wars.

His participation in the Hussite Wars brought him a large fortune. As a reward for his loyal service, he was finally enfeoffed with the lands of Kunětická hora and other areas. In 1436 he also bought Pardubice, one year later obtained from the king the town of Přelouč with surrounding villages as a pawn. He died as one of the richest men in eastern Bohemia. His inheritance was divided among his sons; unfortunately, they lost those possessions just as quickly.
