= Małyszyn =

- Village
- Location within Poland
- Coordinates: 51°14′42″N 18°37′31″E
- Country: Poland
- Voivodeship: Łódź
- County: Wieluń
- Gmina: Wieluń

Małyszyn [maˈwɨʂɨn] is a village in the administrative district of Gmina Wieluń, within Wieluń County, Łódź Voivodeship, in central Poland.
