= Rychłowice =

- Village
- Location within Poland
- Coordinates: 51°11′N 18°35′E
- Country: Poland
- Voivodeship: Łódź
- County: Wieluń
- Gmina: Wieluń
- Time zone: UTC+1 (CET)
  - Summer (DST): UTC+2 (CEST)
- Vehicle registration: EWI

Rychłowice [rɨxwɔˈvit͡sɛ] is a village in the administrative district of Gmina Wieluń, within Wieluń County, Łódź Voivodeship, in south-central Poland.

== History ==
In 1827, the village had a population of 107.

During the German occupation of Poland (World War II), in 1940, the German gendarmerie carried out expulsions of Poles, who were placed in a transit camp in Łódź, and then young Poles were deported to forced labour in Germany and German-occupied France, and others were deported to the General Government in the more eastern part of German-occupied Poland. Houses and farms of expelled Poles were handed over to German colonists as part of the Lebensraum policy.
