= Nowy Świat, Wieluń County =

Nowy Świat
- Village
- Location within Poland
- Coordinates: 51°11′2″N 18°35′55″E
- Country: Poland
- Voivodeship: Łódź
- County: Wieluń
- Gmina: Wieluń

Nowy Świat (Polish pronunciation: [ˈnɔvɨ ˈɕfjat]) is a village in the administrative district of Gmina Wieluń, within Wieluń County, Łódź Voivodeship, in central Poland.
