= Borowiec, Wieluń County =

Borowiec
- Village
- Location within Poland
- Coordinates: 51°16′25″N 18°39′53″E
- Country: Poland
- Voivodeship: Łódź
- County: Wieluń
- Gmina: Wieluń

Borowiec [bɔˈrɔvjɛt͡s] is a village in the administrative district of Gmina Wieluń, within Wieluń County, Łódź Voivodeship, in central Poland.
