= Sieniec =

- Village
- Location within Poland
- Coordinates: 51°14′23″N 18°40′46″E
- Country: Poland
- Voivodeship: Łódź
- County: Wieluń
- Gmina: Wieluń

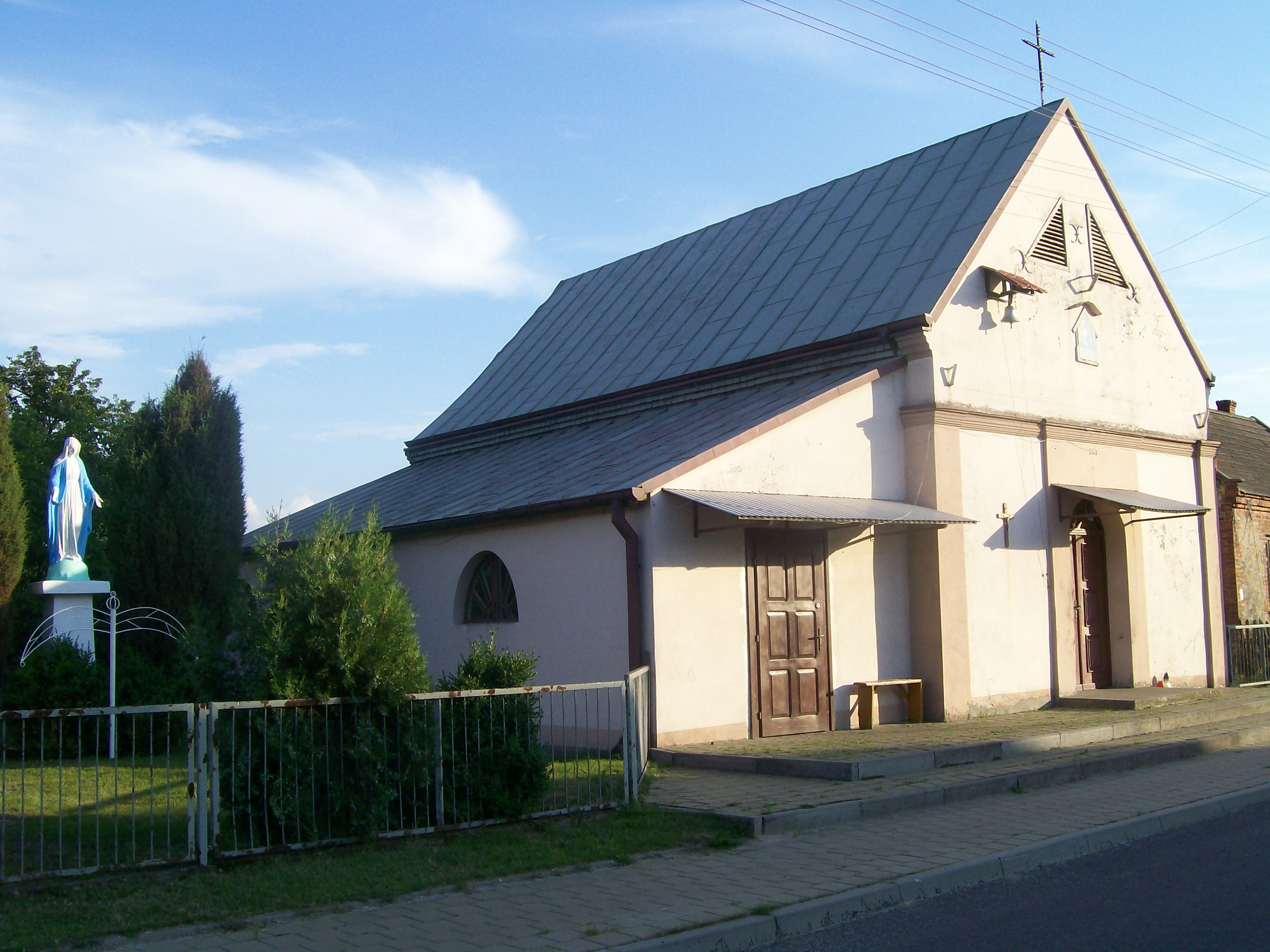
Chapel in Sieniec

Sieniec [ˈɕɛɲɛt͡s] is a village in the administrative district of Gmina Wieluń, within Wieluń County, Łódź Voivodeship, in central Poland.
