= Kurów, Wieluń County =

Kurów
- Village
- Location within Poland
- Coordinates: 51°13′28″N 18°29′10″E
- Country: Poland
- Voivodeship: Łódź
- County: Wieluń
- Gmina: Wieluń

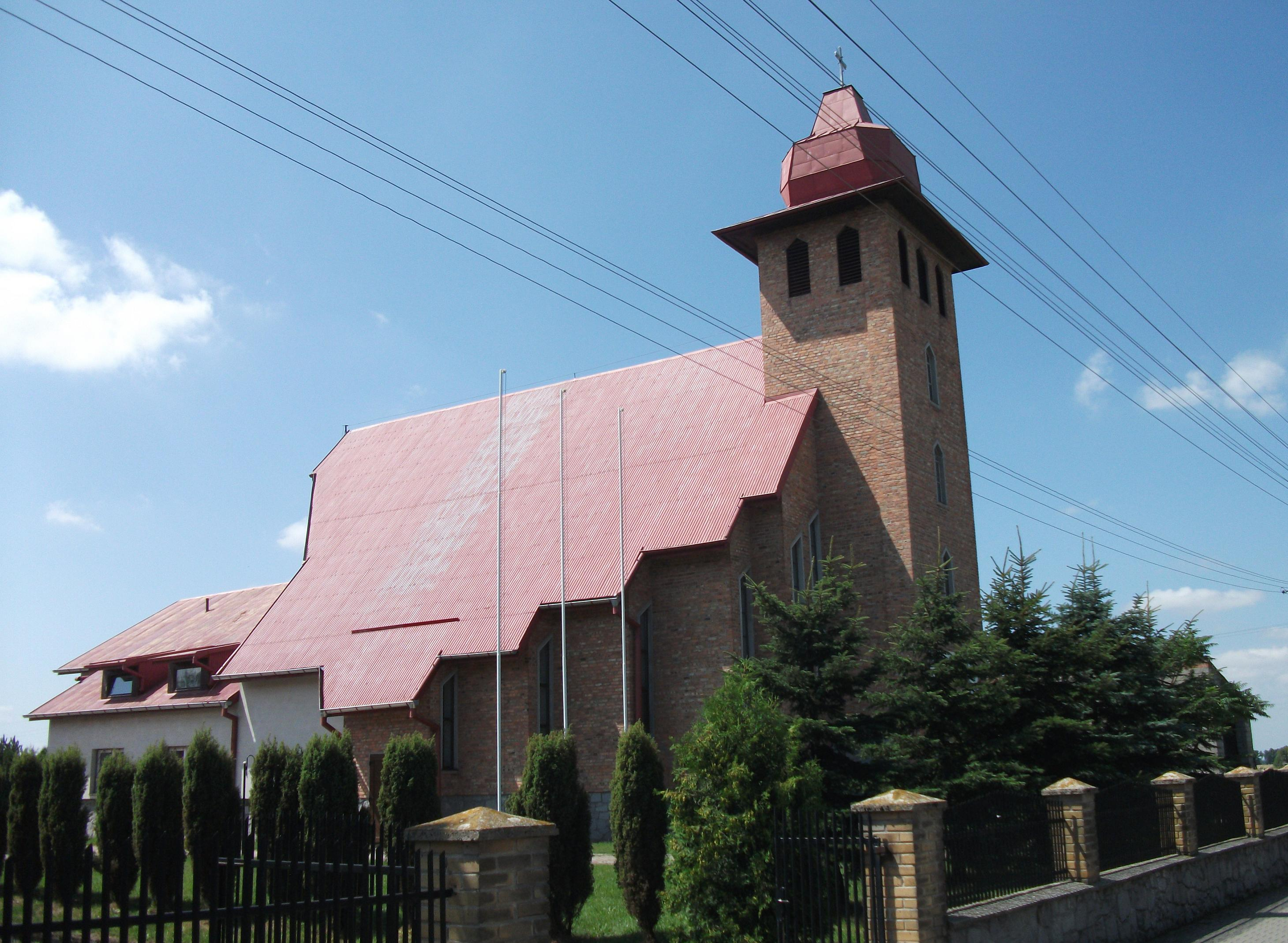
Church in Kurów

Kurów [ˈkuruf] is a village in the administrative district of Gmina Wieluń, within Wieluń County, Łódź Voivodeship, in central Poland.
