= Olewin, Łódź Voivodeship =

Olewin
- Village
- Location within Poland
- Coordinates: 51°13′39″N 18°38′42″E
- Country: Poland
- Voivodeship: Łódź
- County: Wieluń
- Gmina: Wieluń

Olewin [ɔˈlɛvin] is a village in the administrative district of Gmina Wieluń, within Wieluń County, Łódź Voivodeship, in central Poland.
