= Ludwina, Łódź Voivodeship =

Ludwina
- Village
- Location within Poland
- Coordinates: 51°15′16″N 18°39′32″E
- Country: Poland
- Voivodeship: Łódź
- County: Wieluń
- Gmina: Wieluń

Ludwina [ludˈvina] is a village in the administrative district of Gmina Wieluń, within Wieluń County, Łódź Voivodeship, in central Poland.
