= Gmina Wieluń =

Gmina Wieluń Wieluń Commune
- Gmina
- Flag Coat of arms
- Interactive map of Gmina Wieluń
- Coordinates (Wieluń): 51°13′21″N 18°34′26″E
- Country: Poland
- Voivodeship: Łódź
- County: Wieluń
- Seat: Wieluń

Area
  - Total: 131.2 km^{2} (50.7 sq mi)

Population (2006)
  - Total: 32,882
  - Density: 250.6/km^{2} (649.1/sq mi)
  - Urban: 24,347
  - Rural: 8,535
- Website: http://www.um.wielun.pl

Gmina Wieluń is an urban-rural gmina (administrative district) in Wieluń County, Łódź Voivodeship, in central Poland. Its seat is the town of Wieluń, which lies approximately 88 kilometres (55 mi) south-west of the regional capital Łódź.

The gmina covers an area of 131.2 square kilometres (50.7 sq mi), and as of 2006 its total population is 32,882 (out of which the population of Wieluń amounts to 24,347, and the population of the rural part of the gmina is 8,535).

== Villages ==
Apart from the town of Wieluń, Gmina Wieluń contains the villages and settlements of Bieniądzice, Borowiec, Chodaki, Dąbrowa, Gaszyn, Jodłowiec, Kadłub, Klusiny, Krajków, Kurów, Ludwina, Małyszyn, Masłowice, Mokrosze, Nowy Świat, Olewin, Piaski, Ruda, Rychłowice, Sieniec, Srebrnica, Starzenice, Turów, Urbanice, Widoradz, Widoradz Dolny and Zwiechy.

== Neighbouring gminas ==
Gmina Wieluń is bordered by the gminas of Biała, Czarnożyły, Mokrsko, Osjaków, Ostrówek, Pątnów, Skomlin and Wierzchlas.
