= Srebrnica, Łódź Voivodeship =

Srebrnica
- Village
- Location within Poland
- Coordinates: 51°13′N 18°27′E
- Country: Poland
- Voivodeship: Łódź
- County: Wieluń
- Gmina: Wieluń

Srebrnica [srɛbrˈnit͡sa] is a village in the administrative district of Gmina Wieluń, within Wieluń County, Łódź Voivodeship, in central Poland.
