= Gaszyn =

- Village
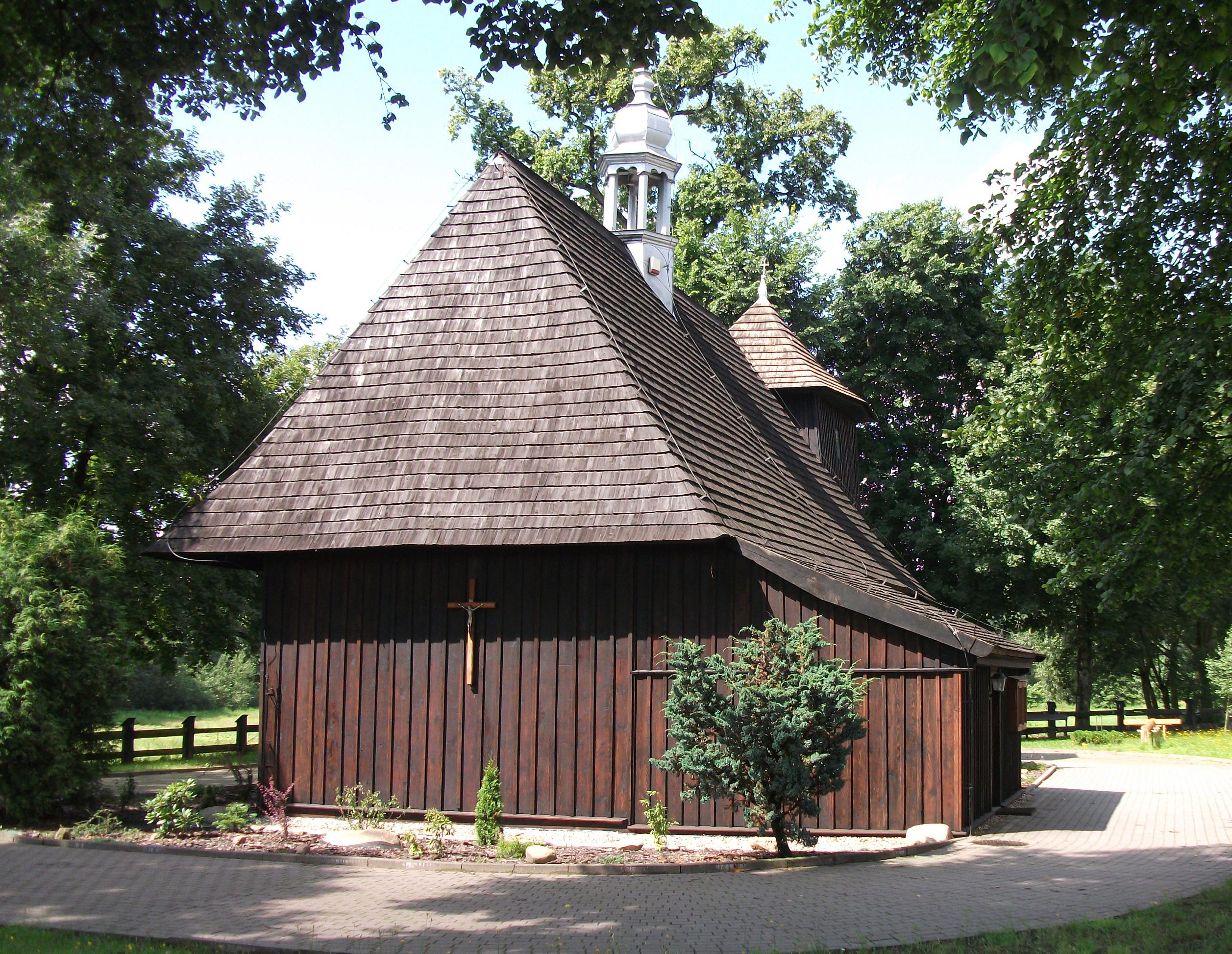
- Church in Gaszyn

- Location within Poland
- Coordinates: 51°11′49″N 18°33′28″E
- Country: Poland
- Voivodeship: Łódź
- County: Wieluń
- Gmina: Wieluń
- Website: http://www.gaszyn.pl

Gaszyn [ˈɡaʂɨn] is a village in the administrative district of Gmina Wieluń, within Wieluń County, Łódź Voivodeship, in central Poland.
