= Popowice, Łódź Voivodeship =

Popowice
- Village
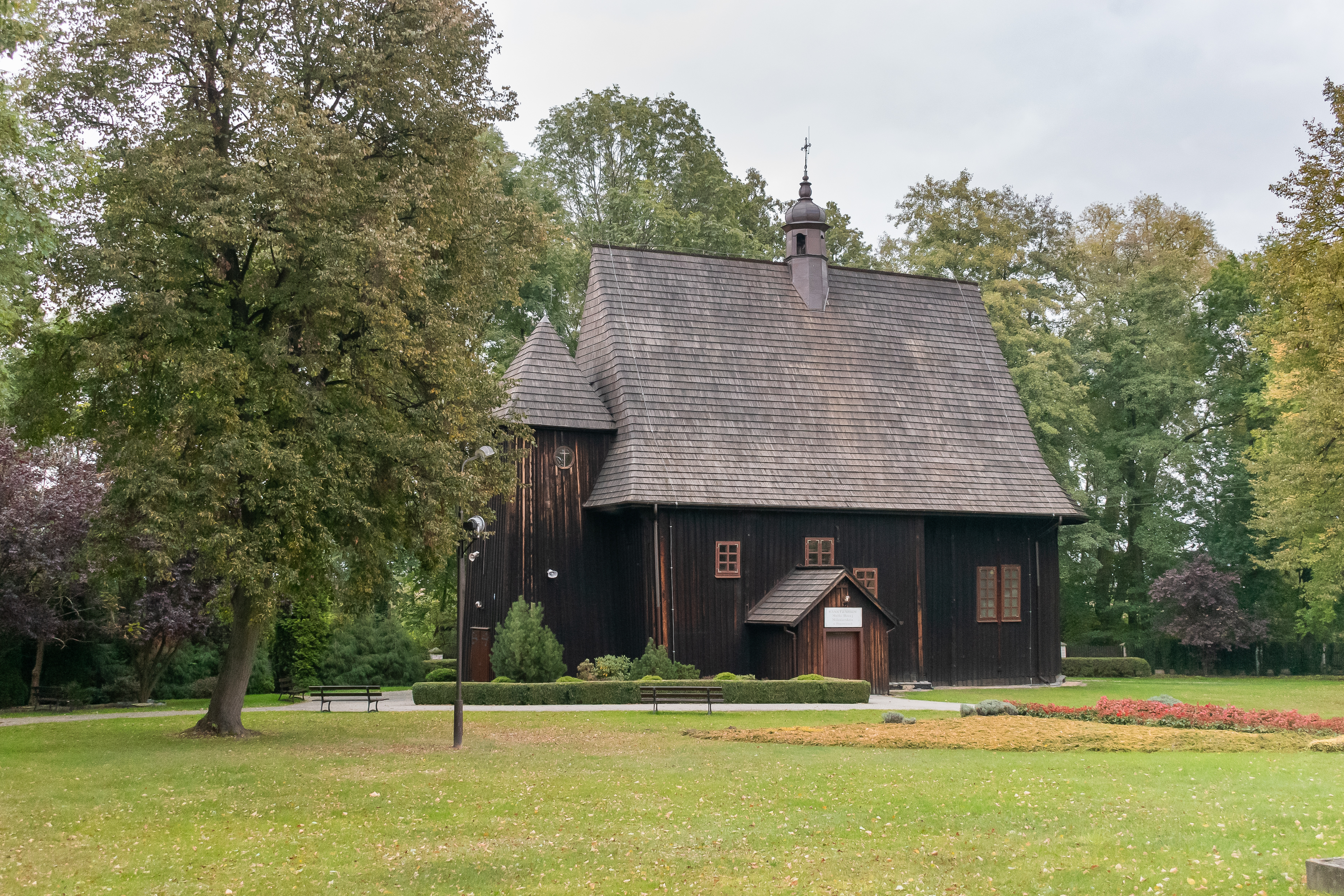
- All Saints church in Popowice

- Location within Poland
- Coordinates: 51°9′N 18°34′E
- Country: Poland
- Voivodeship: Łódź
- County: Wieluń
- Gmina: Pątnów
- Population: 500
- Time zone: UTC+1 (CET)
  - Summer (DST): UTC+2 (CEST)
- Vehicle registration: EWI

Popowice [pɔpɔˈvit͡sɛ] is a village in the administrative district of Gmina Pątnów, within Wieluń County, Łódź Voivodeship, in south-central Poland.

== History ==
The territory became a part of the emerging Polish state in the 10th century. The All Saints church was built in the early 16th century, and was part of the Catholic parish in nearby Kadłub.

During the German occupation of Poland (World War II), in 1940, the German gendarmerie carried out expulsions of Poles, who were placed in a transit camp in Łódź, and then young Poles were deported to forced labour in Germany and German-occupied France, and others were deported to the General Government in the more eastern part of German-occupied Poland. Houses and farms of expelled Poles were handed over to German colonists as part of the Lebensraum policy.
