= Chodaki, Wieluń County =

Chodaki
- Village
- Location within Poland
- Coordinates: 51°13′52″N 18°43′14″E
- Country: Poland
- Voivodeship: Łódź
- County: Wieluń
- Gmina: Wieluń

Chodaki [xɔˈdaki] is a village in the administrative district of Gmina Wieluń, within Wieluń County, Łódź Voivodeship, in central Poland.
