= Krajków, Łódź Voivodeship =

Krajków
- Village
- Interactive map of Krajków
- Country: Poland
- Voivodeship: Łódź
- County: Wieluń
- Gmina: Wieluń

Krajków [ˈkrai̯kuf] is a village in the administrative district of Gmina Wieluń, within Wieluń County, Łódź Voivodeship, in central Poland.
