= Orebites =

Radical Hussite faction founded 1423

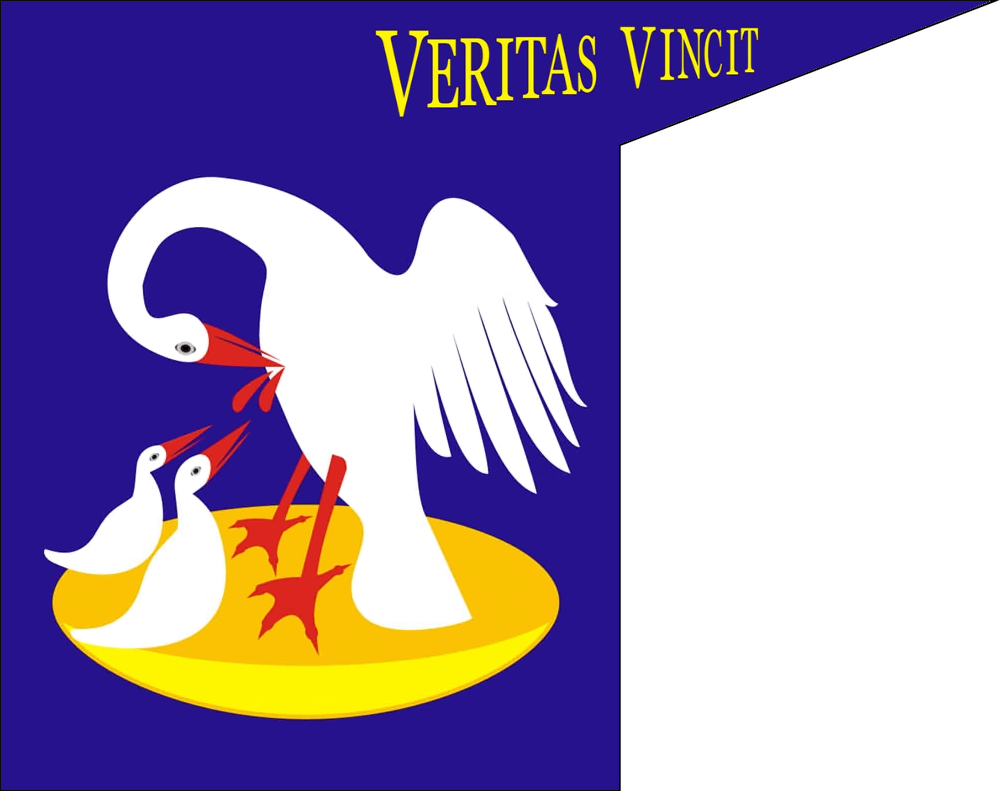
Banner with pelican used by Orebites, later called Orphans (hypothetical colors)

The Orebites (Czech: Orebité), also called Lesser Taborites and later known as Sirotci ("Orphans"; German: Waisen), officially Orphans' Union (Czech: Sirotčí svaz), were followers of a radical wing of the Hussites in Bohemia. The founders took part in the procession on Mount Oreb, near Třebechovice pod Orebem and Hradec. Founded in 1423 originally under the name Lesser Tábor, it consisted mostly of poorer burghers and some members of the Czech nobility who joined with the commander Jan Žižka.

The ideological founder of the Orebites was the priest Ambrož Hradecký. Leaders included Hynek Krušina of Lichtenburg and Diviš Bořek of Miletínek, the captain of the Hussites in Eastern and Central Bohemia. The Orebites were instrumental in the burning of the Benedictine monastery in Mnichovo Hradiště in the early summer of 1420, and in autumn, they supported the rest of the Hussites at the Battle of Vyšehrad.

After Žižka's death (1424) left them "orphaned", these combatants adopted their new name. From 1424 to 1428, they were led by the priest Ambrož of Hradec and then by another priest, Prokop the Lesser. Hejtman Jan Čapek of Sány was elected as their military commander (1431–1434). After 1457, most supporters belonged to the Bohemian Brethren church and played an important role in its development.

== Towns joined with the Union ==
All towns are in Bohemia, unless otherwise noted.

- Vysoké Mýto
- Čáslav
- Kouřim
- Kolín
- Kutná Hora (in condominium with the Taborites)
- Trutnov
- Tachov (from 1427)
- New Town, Prague (from 1429)
- Český Brod
- Mladá Boleslav
- Boseň
- Hradec Králové
- Dvůr Králové
- Bělá pod Bezdězem
- Bezděz
- Česká Lípa
- Litomyšl
- Náchod
- Český Dub
- Topoľčany in Slovakia
- Skalica in Slovakia

== Aristocratic members ==
- Jan Roháč of Dubá
- Jan Kolúch of Vesec
- Čáslav Kaplíř of Sulevice
- Vilém Jeník of Mečkov
- Jan Hertvík of Rušinov
- Wilhelm Kostka of Postupice
- Jan Žampach of Potštejn
- Mikuláš the Elder Trčka of Lípa
- Jiří of Dubá
- Jan Baštín of Porostlá
- Matěj Salava of Lípa
- Jan Krušina of Lichtenburk
- Aleš Vřešťovský of Rýzmburk
- Mikuláš of Keuschberk
- Anežka of Trocnov
