= Urbanice (Pardubice District) =

- Municipality
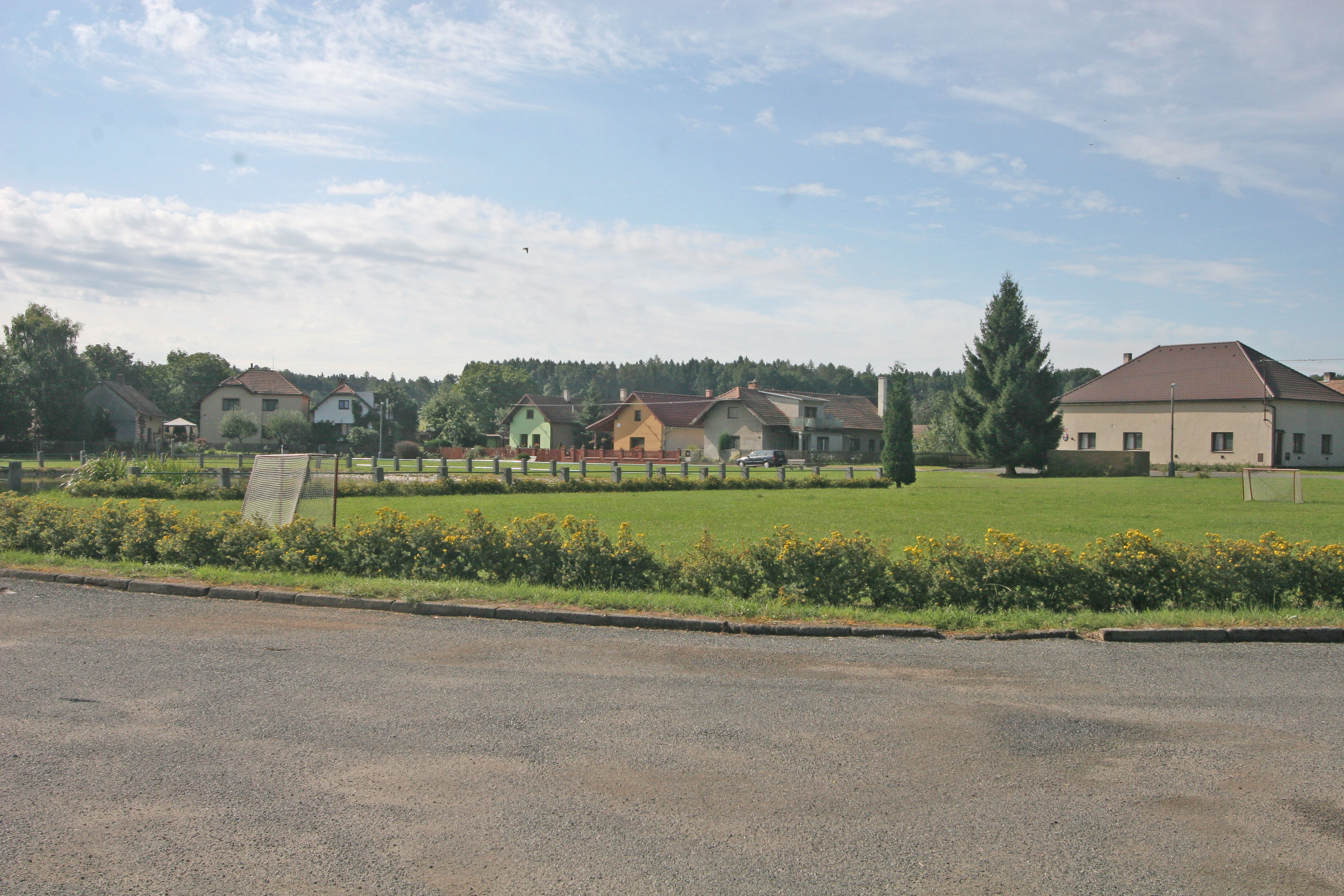
- Centre of Urbanice

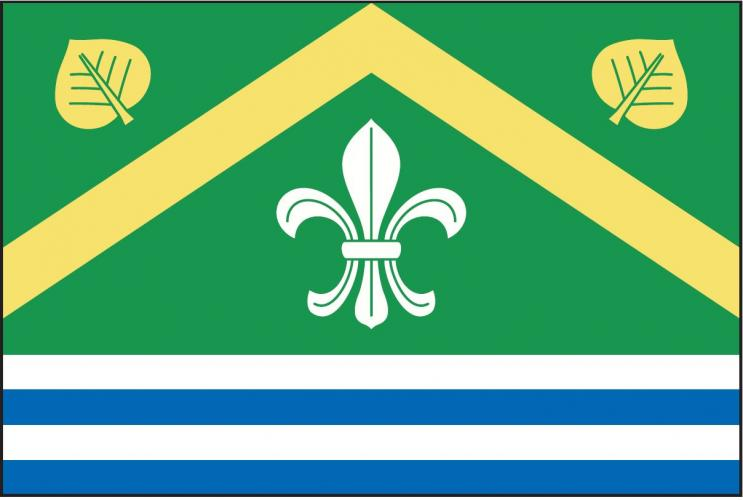
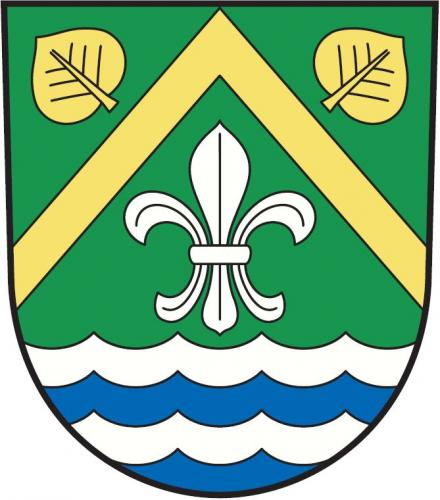
- Flag Coat of arms

- Location in the Czech Republic
- Coordinates: 49°58′26″N 15°34′1″E
- Country: Czech Republic
- Region: Pardubice
- District: Pardubice
- First mentioned: 1383

Area
  - Total: 3.53 km^{2} (1.36 sq mi)
- Elevation: 295 m (968 ft)

Population (2026-01-01)
  - Total: 61
  - Density: 17/km^{2} (45/sq mi)
- Time zone: UTC+1 (CET)
  - Summer (DST): UTC+2 (CEST)
- Postal code: 535 01
- Website: urbanice-pce.cz

Urbanice is a municipality and village in Pardubice District in the Pardubice Region of the Czech Republic. It has about 60 inhabitants.

== Demographics ==
Historical population
Year	Pop.	±%
1869	197	—
1880	204	+3.6%
1890	200	−2.0%
1900	184	−8.0%
1910	175	−4.9%
1921	168	−4.0%
1930	157	−6.5%
1950	147	−6.4%
1961	126	−14.3%
1970	110	−12.7%
1980	105	−4.5%
1991	75	−28.6%
2001	67	−10.7%
2011	67	+0.0%
2021	63	−6.0%
Source: Censuses
