= Turów, Łódź Voivodeship =

Turów
- Village
- Location within Poland
- Coordinates: 51°12′45″N 18°31′15″E
- Country: Poland
- Voivodeship: Łódź
- County: Wieluń
- Gmina: Wieluń

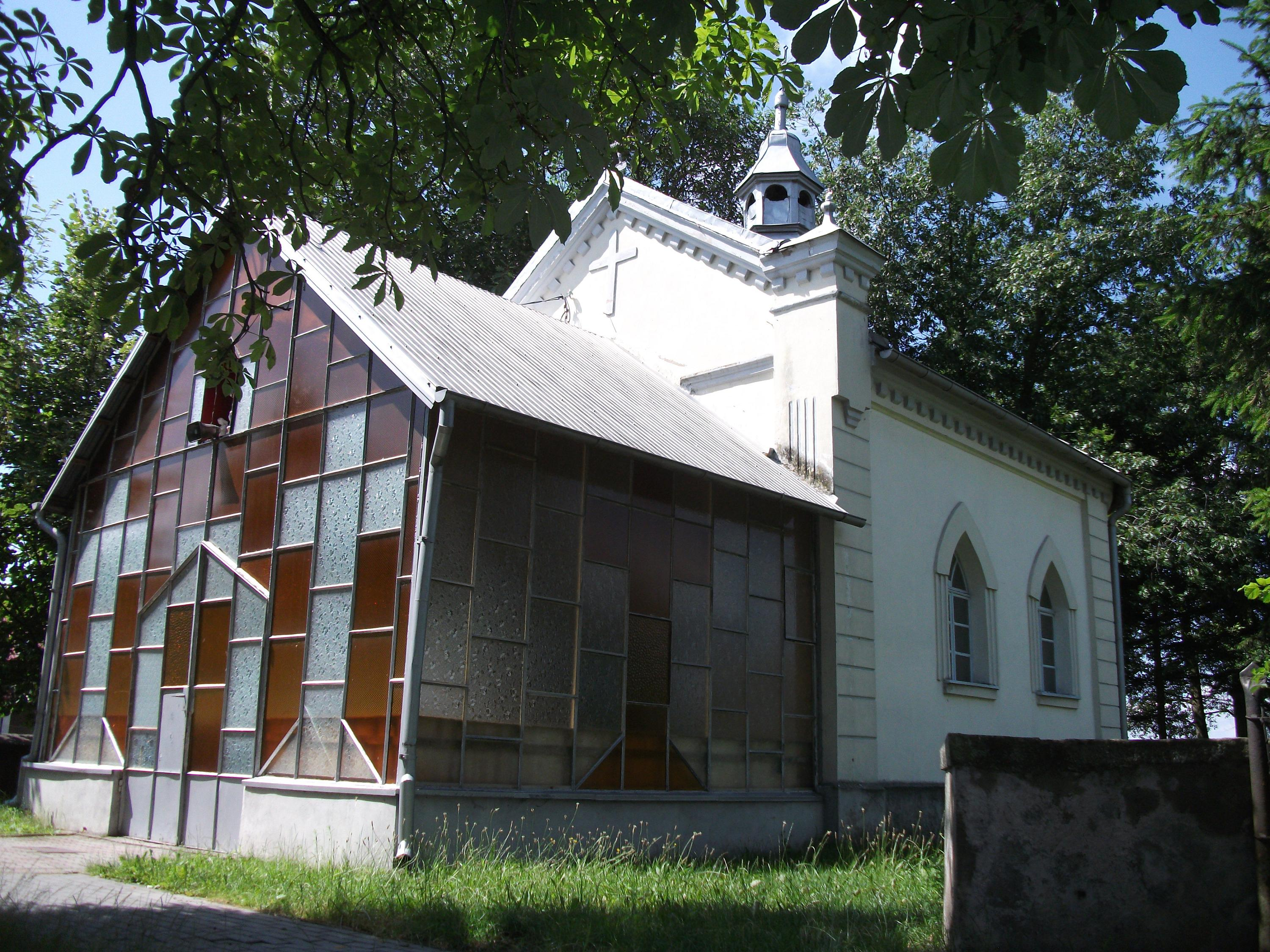
Chapel in Turów

Turów [ˈturuf] is a village in the administrative district of Gmina Wieluń, within Wieluń County, Łódź Voivodeship, in central Poland.
