= Kunětická hora =

Coordinates: 50°04′48″N 15°48′46″E

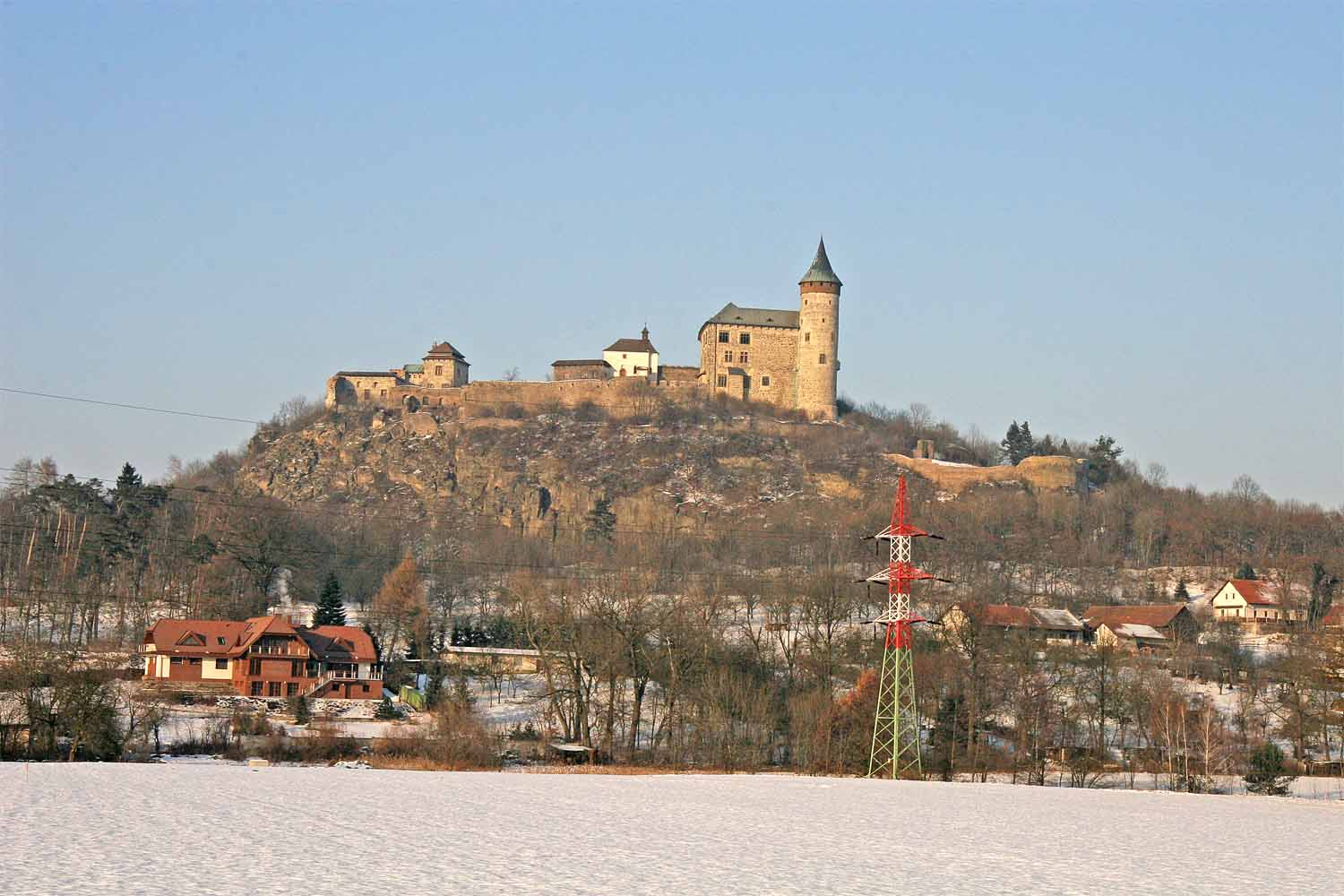
Kunětická hora with the Castle

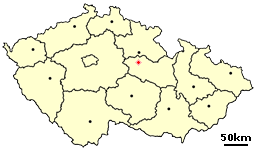
Location of Kunětická hora in the Czech Republic

Kunětická hora is a hill in the municipality of Ráby in the Pardubice Region of the Czech Republic, about 6 km north-northeast from the city of Pardubice.

Kunětická hora has an elevation of 307 m (1,007 ft) above sea level. It sits in a plain of the East Elbe Table, above which it rises 82 m (269 ft). Geologically, the hill is a laccolith, dating from the Cenozoic era. Toward the end of the 19th century, the slopes of the hill were used as a quarry, at such a pace that the hill was in danger of disappearing.

The hill is best known for Kunětická hora Castle, a castle at its summit. A modern water reservoir has been built inside the top part of the hill.
