= Kunětická hora Castle =

Castle in Czechia

Coordinates: 50°04′50″N 15°48′55″E

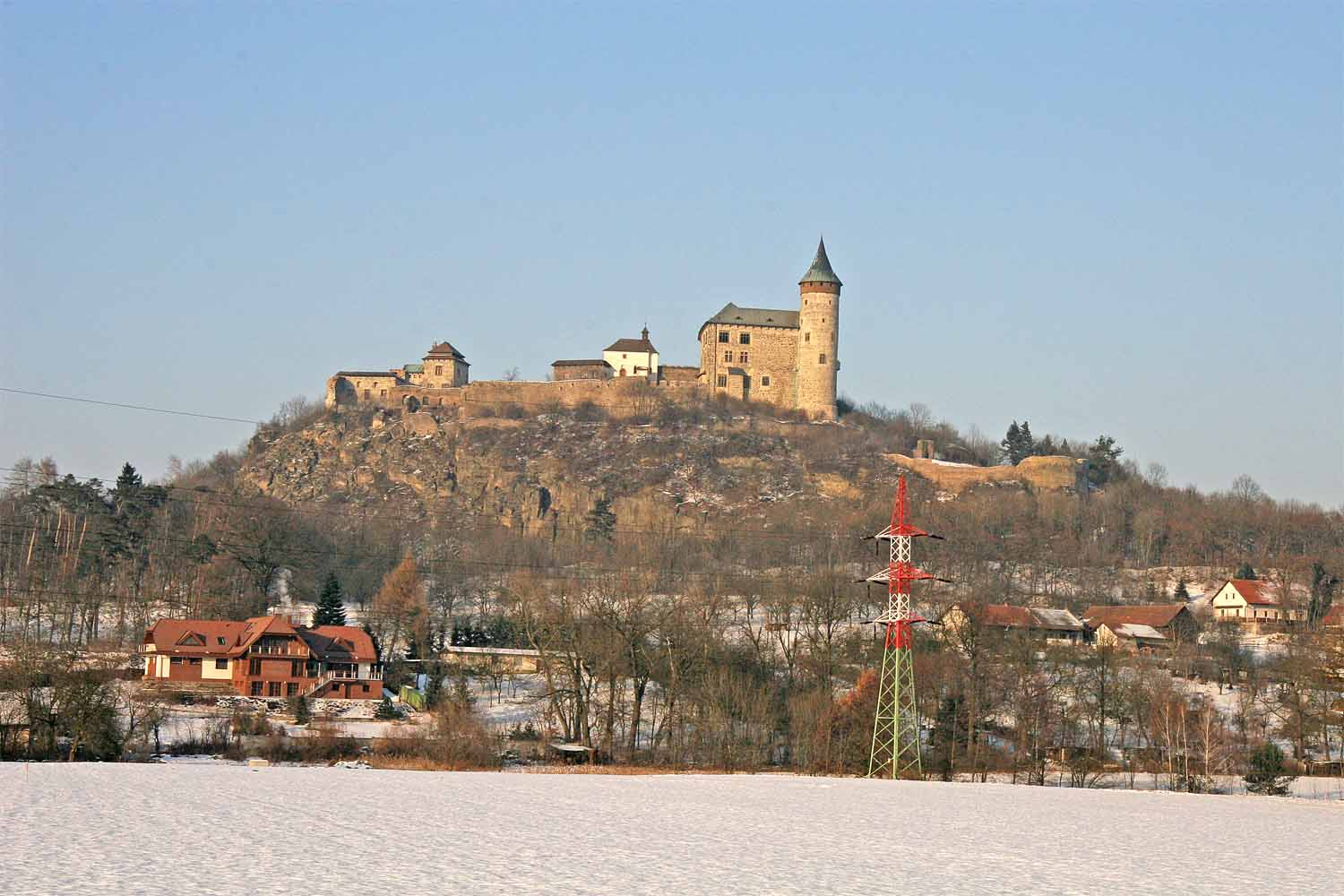
Kunětická hora Castle

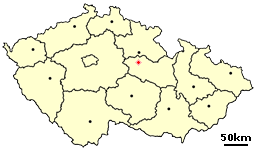
Location of Kunětická hora Castle in the Czech Republic

Kunětická hora Castle (Czech: hrad Kunětická hora) is a castle in the municipality of Ráby in the Pardubice Region of the Czech Republic. The castle lies on Kunětická hora Hill, about 6 km from the city of Pardubice. The castle played an important role during the Hussite Wars of the early 15th century, as a fortress of Diviš Bořek of Miletínek. Today the castle is open to the public as a museum.

== History ==
In 1491 it was bought by Vilém of Pernštejn, who had the castle rebuilt in the late Gothic style, with two towers and a moat. The construction was continued by Vilém's sons in the early Renaissance style. During the Thirty Years' War, in the early 17th century, the castle was besieged several times; at the end of the war, Swedish troops burned it to the ground.

The castle remained a ruin until the early 20th century, when the Pardubice Museum Society was formed. The group purchased the site in 1919 and began reconstruction in 1923, according to the plans of architect Dušan Jurkovič. The rebuilding was completed in 1996.

== Present ==
Today the castle is open to the public as a museum. On display are surviving murals, including a 1523 work depicting Samson and Delilah, the oldest known Renaissance mural in Bohemia. The castle also hosts occasional music or theatrical performances.

== Gallery ==
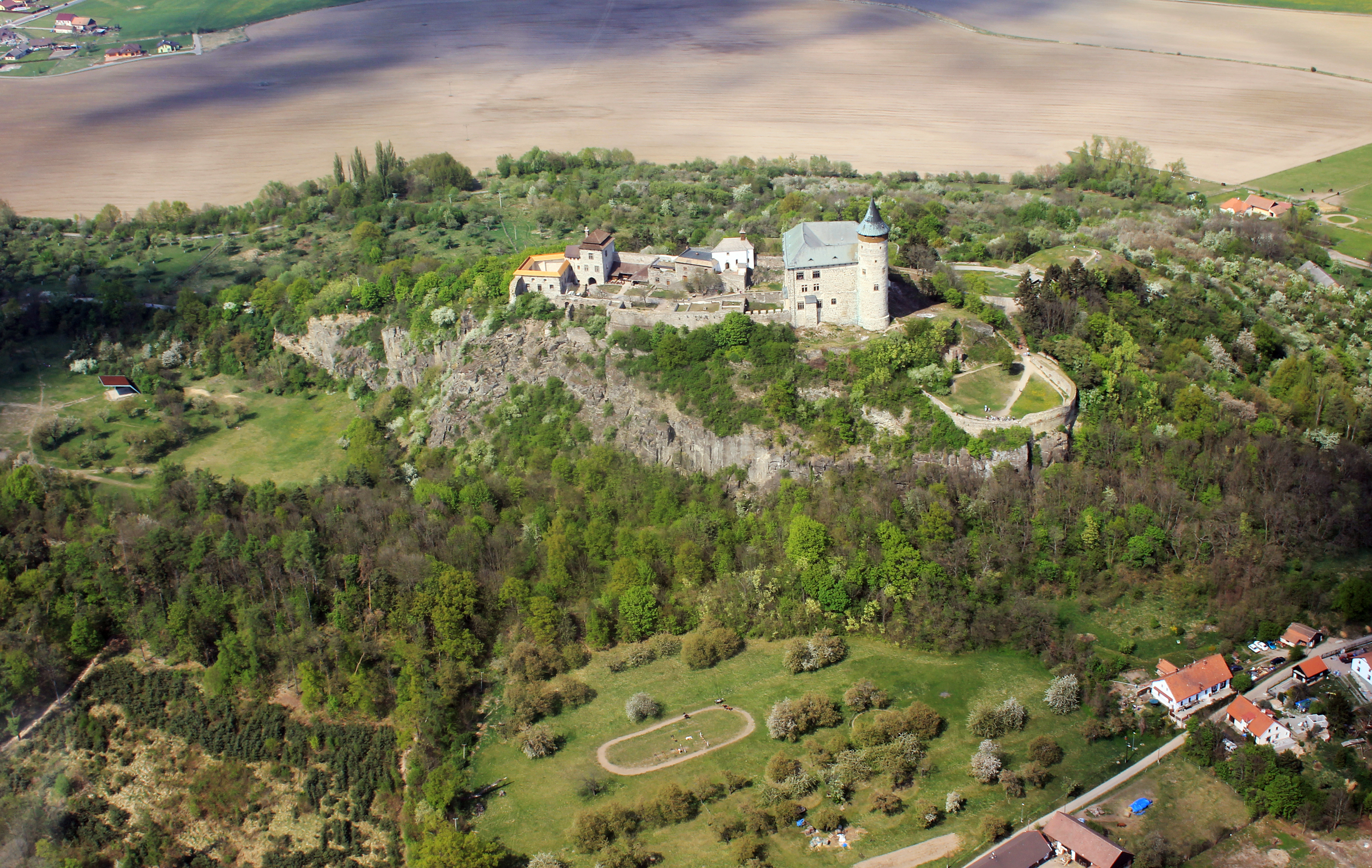
Aerial view

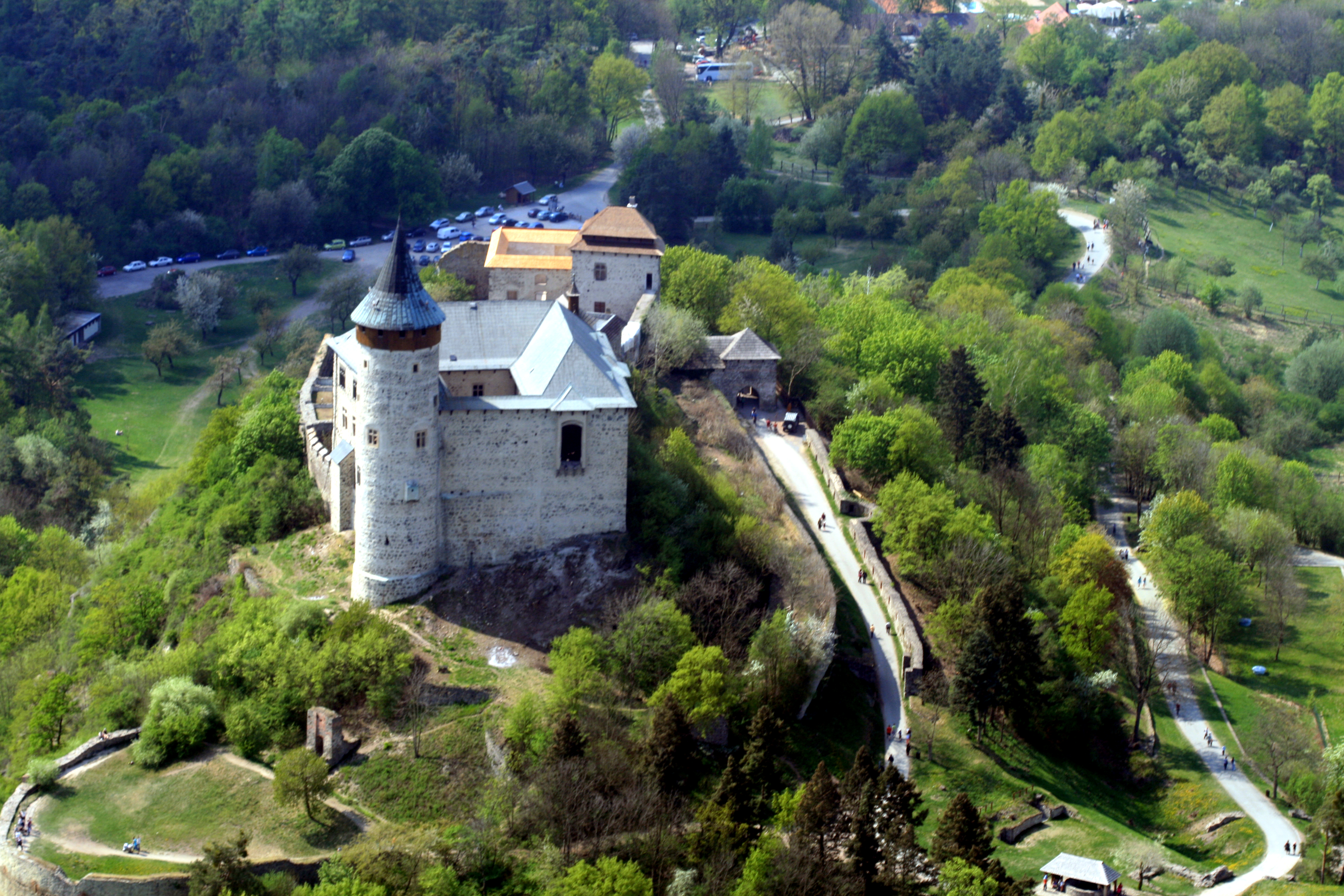
Aerial view

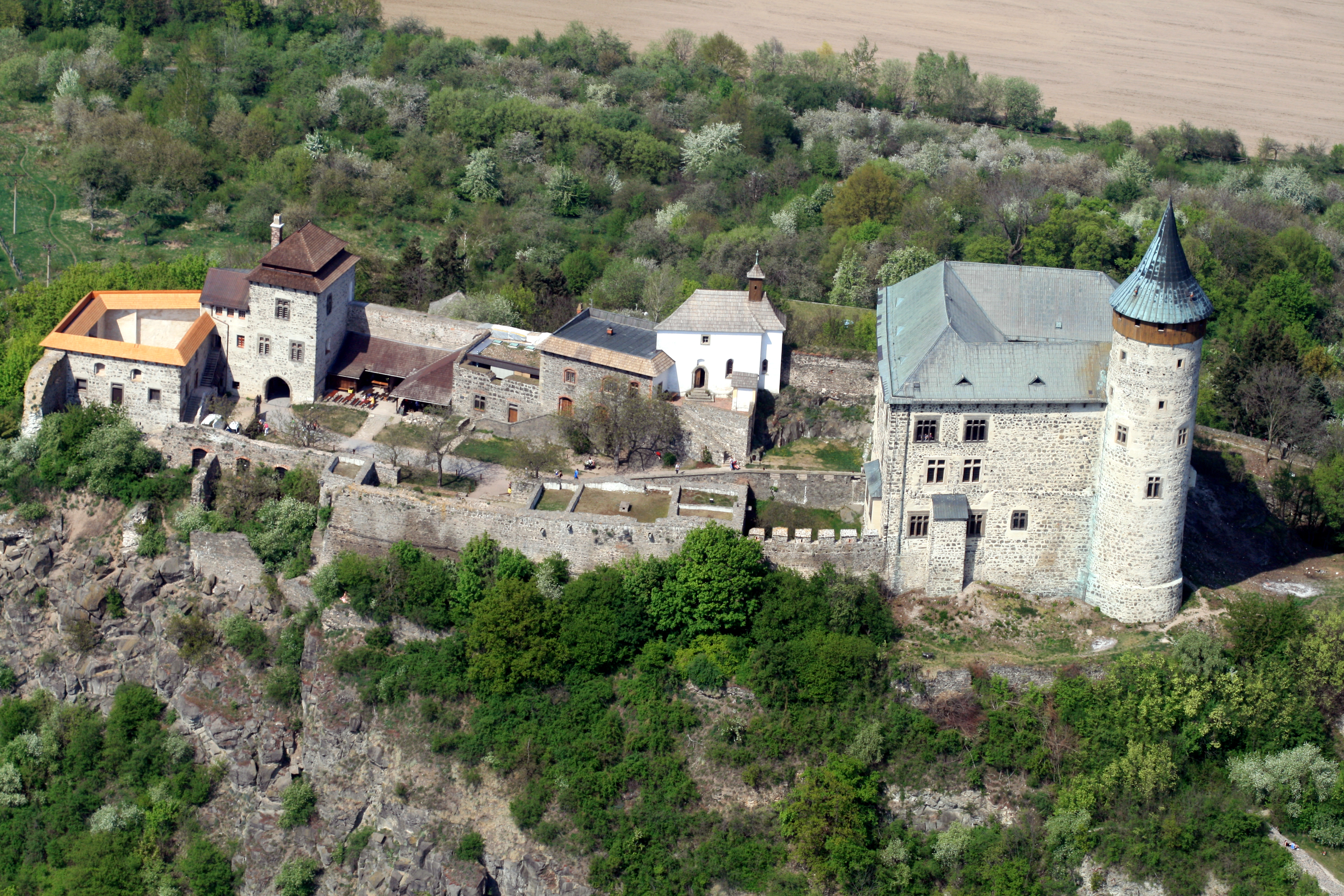
Aerial view
