= Kosice (disambiguation) =

Košice is the second largest city in Slovakia. Kosice or Košice may also refer to:

== People ==
- Gyula Kosice (1924–2016), Argentine sculptor

== Places ==
=== Czech Republic ===
- Kosice (Hradec Králové District), a municipality and village in Hradec Králové Region
- Košice (Kutná Hora District), a municipality and village in Central Bohemian Region
- Košice (Tábor District), a municipality and village in South Bohemian Region

=== Poland ===
- Kosice, Poland, a village
