= Vodranty =

- Municipality
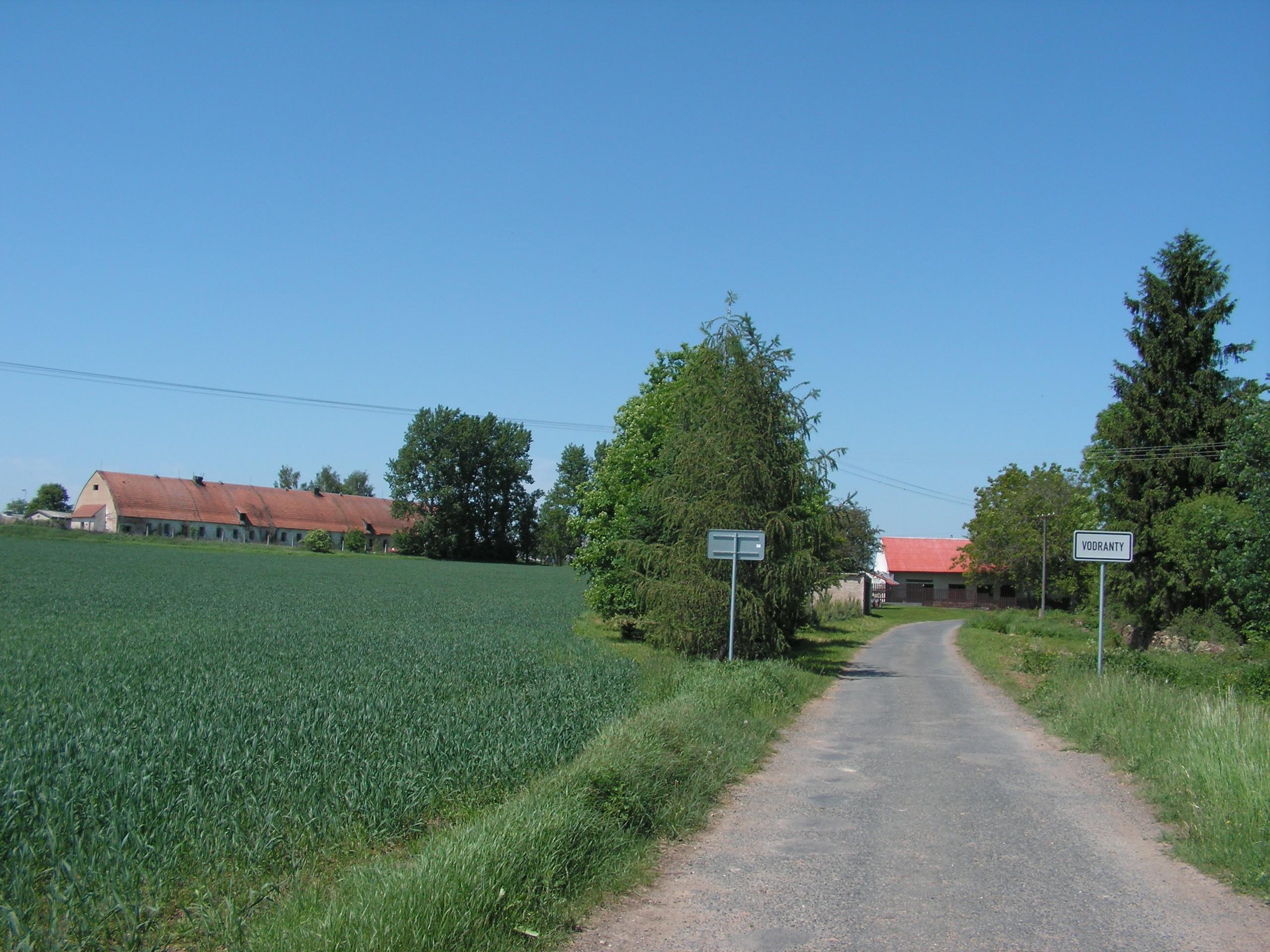
- View from the south

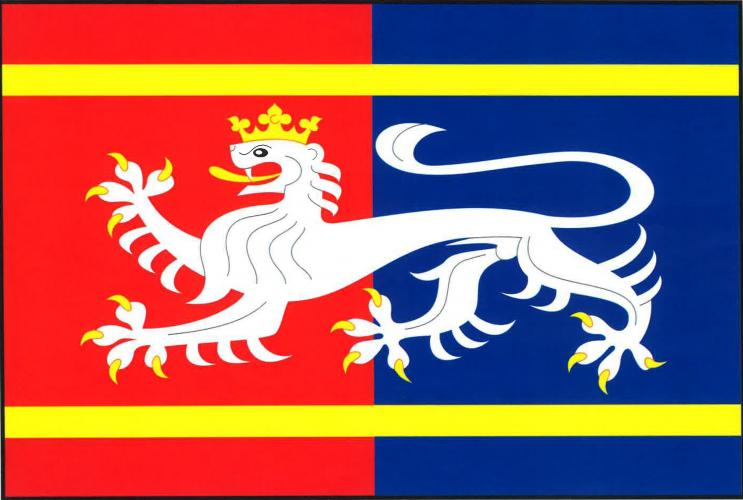
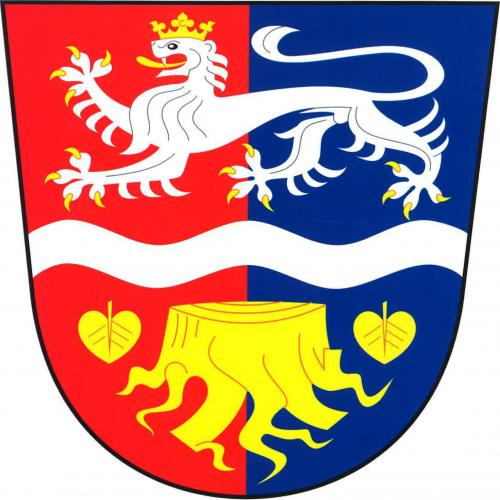
- Flag Coat of arms

- Location in the Czech Republic
- Coordinates: 49°53′26″N 15°20′11″E
- Country: Czech Republic
- Region: Central Bohemian
- District: Kutná Hora
- First mentioned: 1738

Area
  - Total: 1.60 km^{2} (0.62 sq mi)
- Elevation: 267 m (876 ft)

Population (2026-01-01)
  - Total: 82
  - Density: 51/km^{2} (130/sq mi)
- Time zone: UTC+1 (CET)
  - Summer (DST): UTC+2 (CEST)
- Postal code: 286 01
- Website: www.vodranty.cz

Vodranty is a municipality and village in Kutná Hora District in the Central Bohemian Region of the Czech Republic. It has about 80 inhabitants.

== History ==
The first written mention of Vodranty is from 1738.

== Demographics ==
Historical population
Year	Pop.	±%
1869	218	—
1880	205	−6.0%
1890	228	+11.2%
1900	227	−0.4%
1910	197	−13.2%
1921	200	+1.5%
1930	171	−14.5%
1950	160	−6.4%
1961	153	−4.4%
1970	137	−10.5%
1980	128	−6.6%
1991	99	−22.7%
2001	79	−20.2%
2011	75	−5.1%
2021	81	+8.0%
Source: Censuses
