= Pertoltice (Kutná Hora District) =

- Municipality
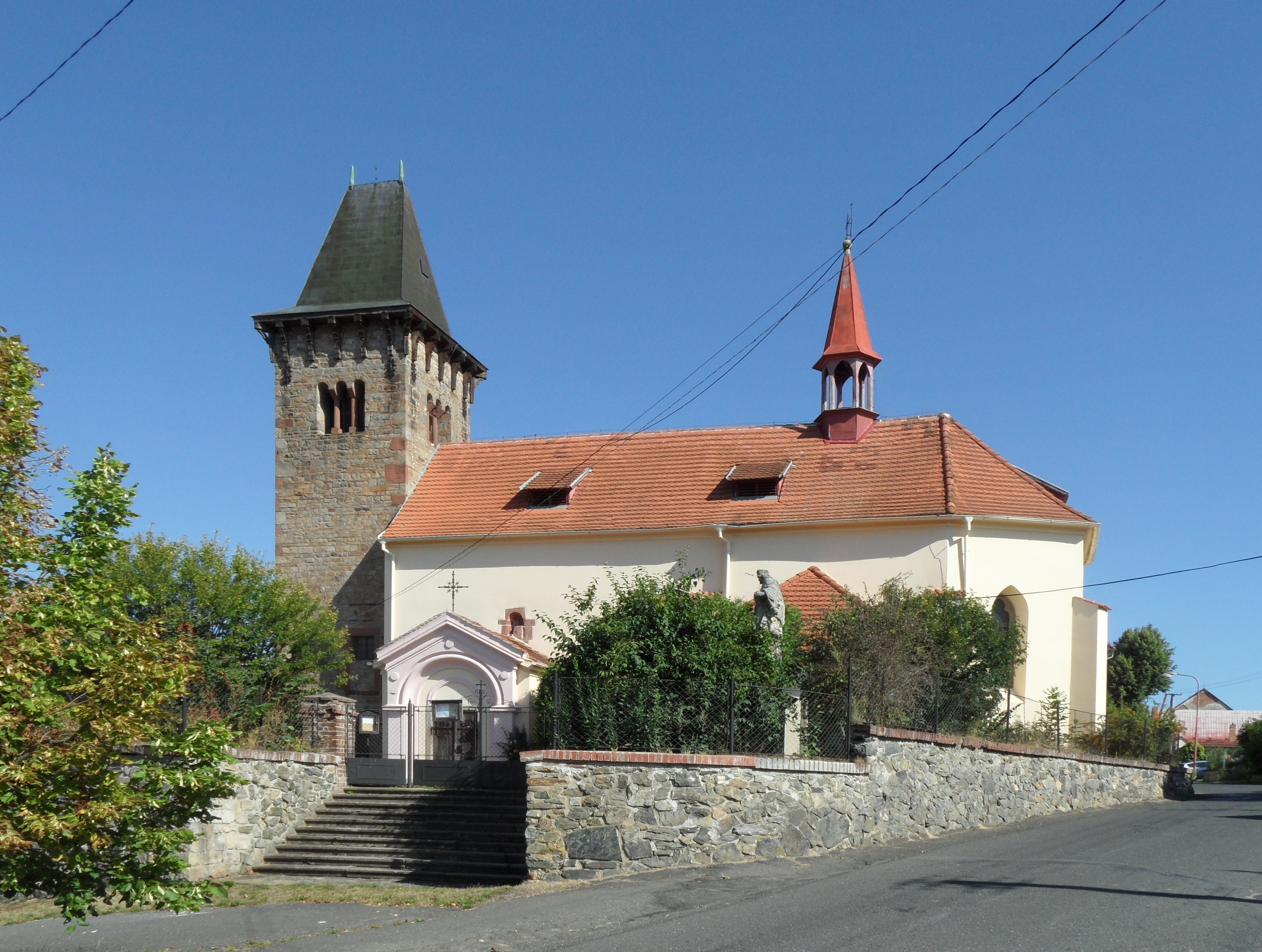
- Church of Saint George

- Location in the Czech Republic
- Coordinates: 49°45′18″N 15°10′54″E
- Country: Czech Republic
- Region: Central Bohemian
- District: Kutná Hora
- First mentioned: 1352

Area
  - Total: 8.78 km^{2} (3.39 sq mi)
- Elevation: 452 m (1,483 ft)

Population (2026-01-01)
  - Total: 169
  - Density: 19.2/km^{2} (49.9/sq mi)
- Time zone: UTC+1 (CET)
  - Summer (DST): UTC+2 (CEST)
- Postal code: 285 22
- Website: www.pertoltice-kh.cz

Pertoltice is a municipality and village in Kutná Hora District in the Central Bohemian Region of the Czech Republic. It has about 200 inhabitants.

== Administrative division ==
Pertoltice consists of six municipal parts (in brackets population according to the 2021 census):

- Pertoltice (80)
- Budkovice (9)
- Chlístovice (10)
- Laziště (38)
- Machovice (11)
- Milanovice (2)

== Demographics ==
Historical population
Year	Pop.	±%
1869	722	—
1880	709	−1.8%
1890	675	−4.8%
1900	672	−0.4%
1910	657	−2.2%
1921	576	−12.3%
1930	500	−13.2%
1950	400	−20.0%
1961	348	−13.0%
1970	296	−14.9%
1980	243	−17.9%
1991	194	−20.2%
2001	169	−12.9%
2011	142	−16.0%
2021	150	+5.6%
Source: Censuses
