= Souňov =

- Municipality
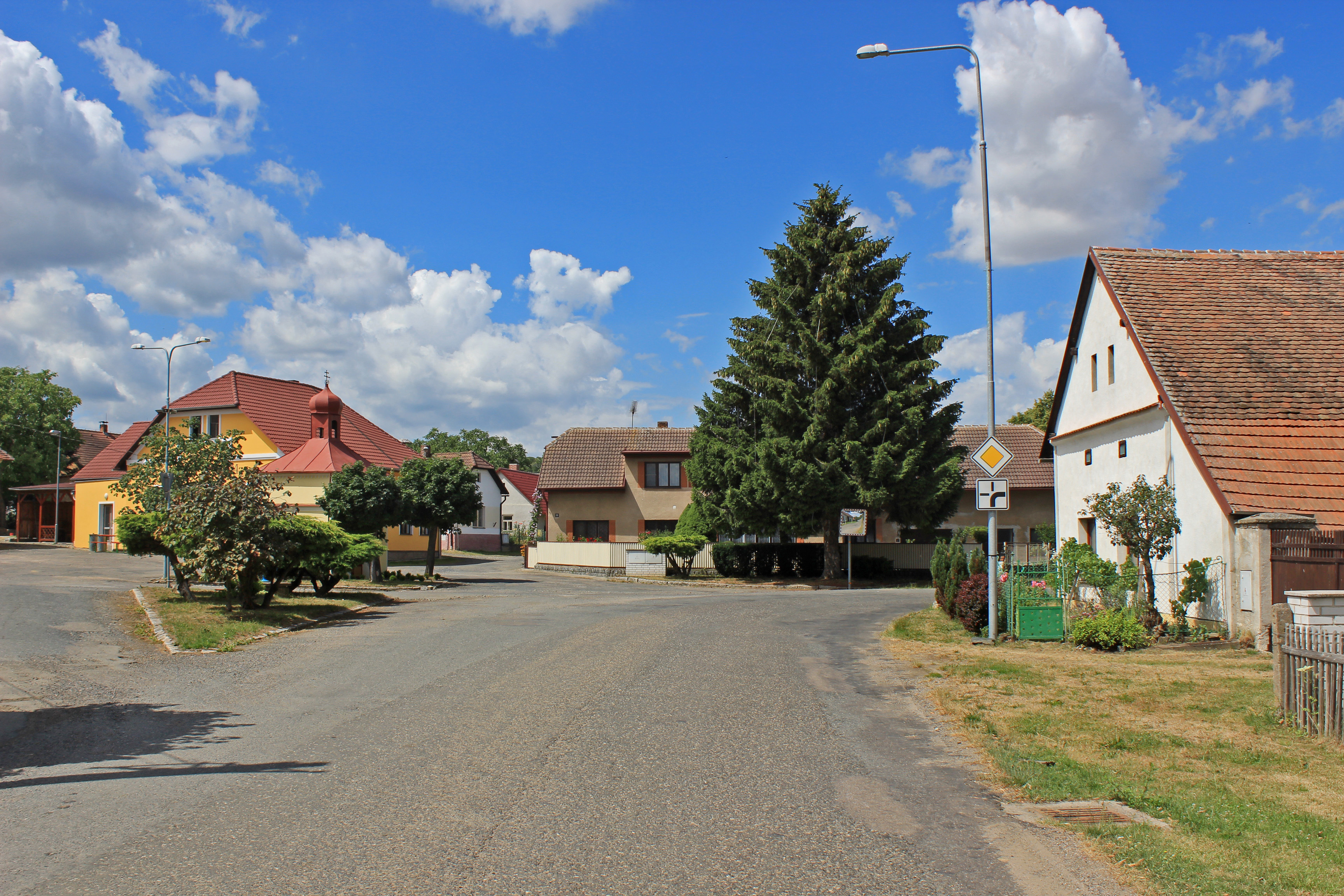
- Centre of Souňov

- Location in the Czech Republic
- Coordinates: 49°52′48″N 15°18′56″E
- Country: Czech Republic
- Region: Central Bohemian
- District: Kutná Hora
- First mentioned: 1416

Area
  - Total: 2.68 km^{2} (1.03 sq mi)
- Elevation: 298 m (978 ft)

Population (2026-01-01)
  - Total: 143
  - Density: 53.4/km^{2} (138/sq mi)
- Time zone: UTC+1 (CET)
  - Summer (DST): UTC+2 (CEST)
- Postal code: 286 01
- Website: www.sounov.cz

Souňov is a municipality and village in Kutná Hora District in the Central Bohemian Region of the Czech Republic. It has about 100 inhabitants.

== Demographics ==
Historical population
Year	Pop.	±%
1869	196	—
1880	223	+13.8%
1890	234	+4.9%
1900	220	−6.0%
1910	203	−7.7%
1921	193	−4.9%
1930	223	+15.5%
1950	183	−17.9%
1961	174	−4.9%
1970	149	−14.4%
1980	152	+2.0%
1991	130	−14.5%
2001	119	−8.5%
2011	130	+9.2%
2021	141	+8.5%
Source: Censuses
