= Štipoklasy =

- Municipality
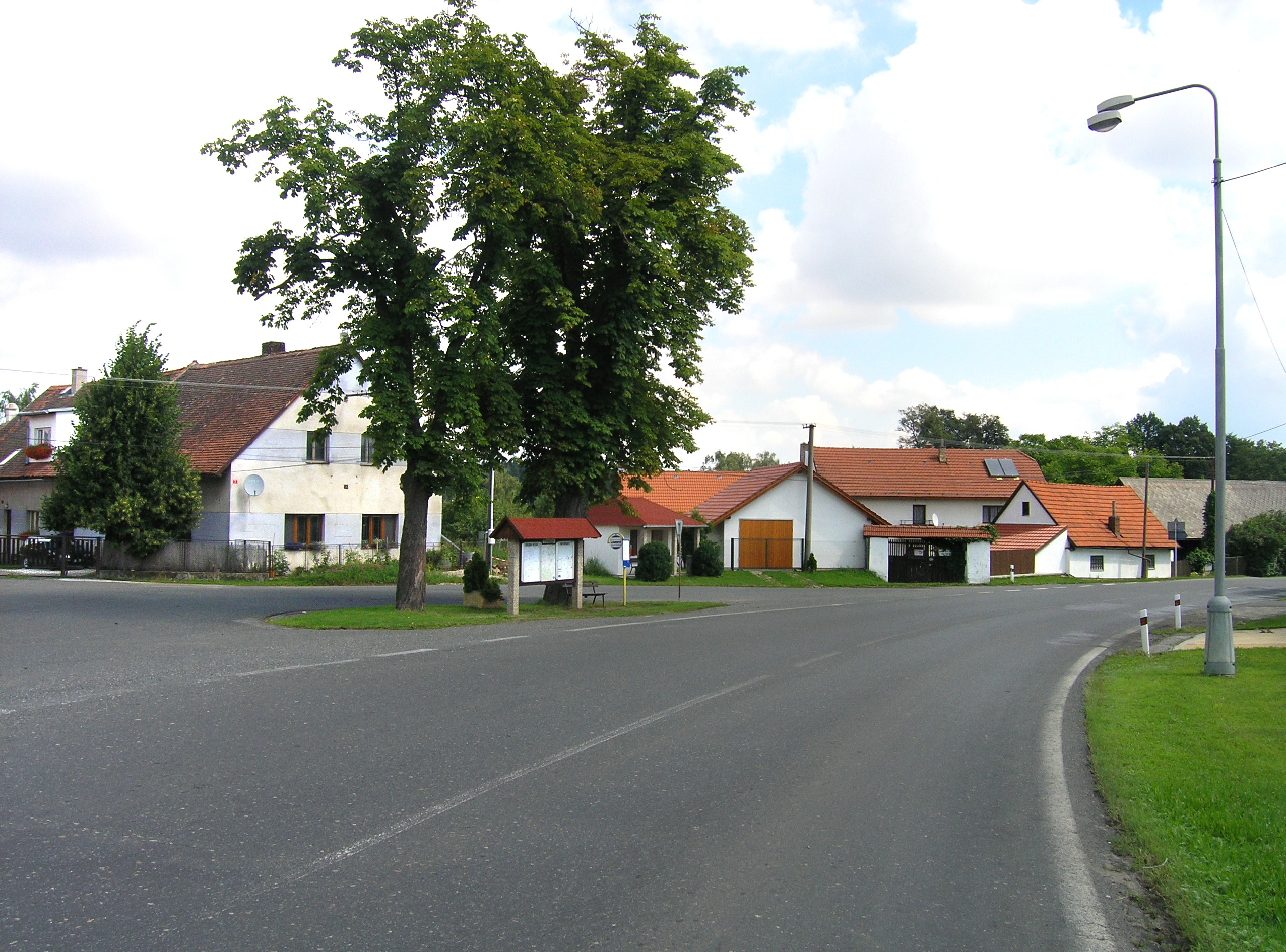
- Centre of Štipoklasy

- Location in the Czech Republic
- Coordinates: 49°49′29″N 15°12′48″E
- Country: Czech Republic
- Region: Central Bohemian
- District: Kutná Hora
- First mentioned: 1385

Area
  - Total: 3.79 km^{2} (1.46 sq mi)
- Elevation: 470 m (1,540 ft)

Population (2026-01-01)
  - Total: 134
  - Density: 35.4/km^{2} (91.6/sq mi)
- Time zone: UTC+1 (CET)
  - Summer (DST): UTC+2 (CEST)
- Postal code: 284 01
- Website: www.stipoklasy.cz

Štipoklasy is a municipality and village in Kutná Hora District in the Central Bohemian Region of the Czech Republic. It has about 100 inhabitants.

== Demographics ==
Historical population
Year	Pop.	±%
1869	209	—
1880	206	−1.4%
1890	204	−1.0%
1900	194	−4.9%
1910	199	+2.6%
1921	220	+10.6%
1930	183	−16.8%
1950	182	−0.5%
1961	178	−2.2%
1970	147	−17.4%
1980	144	−2.0%
1991	130	−9.7%
2001	123	−5.4%
2011	156	+26.8%
2021	133	−14.7%
Source: Censuses
