= Bernardov =

- Municipality
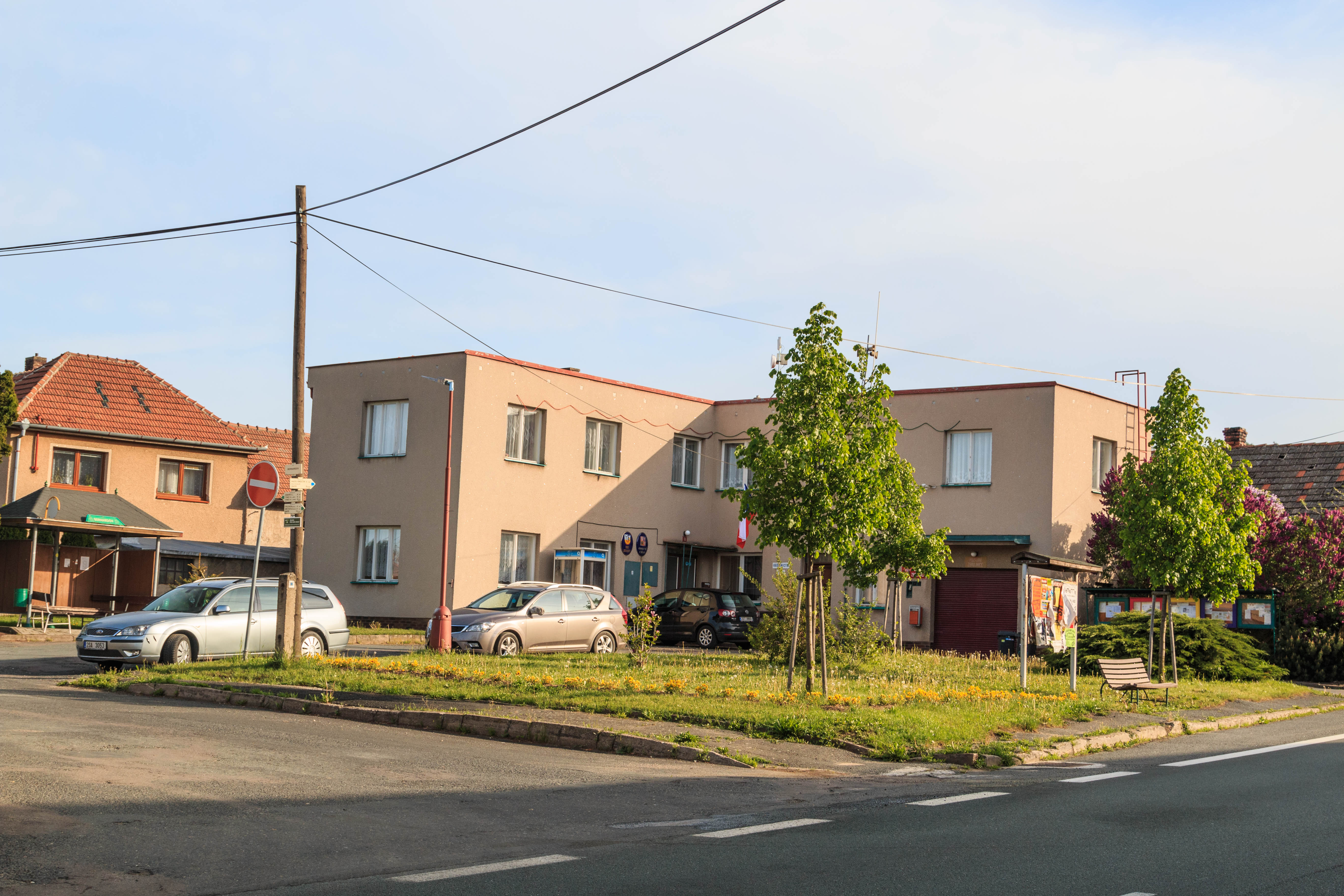
- Municipal office

- Flag Coat of arms

- Location in the Czech Republic
- Coordinates: 50°0′51″N 15°23′55″E
- Country: Czech Republic
- Region: Central Bohemian
- District: Kutná Hora
- First mentioned: 1700

Area
  - Total: 3.45 km^{2} (1.33 sq mi)
- Elevation: 235 m (771 ft)

Population (2026-01-01)
  - Total: 165
  - Density: 47.8/km^{2} (124/sq mi)
- Time zone: UTC+1 (CET)
  - Summer (DST): UTC+2 (CEST)
- Postal code: 284 01
- Website: www.bernardov.cz

Bernardov is a municipality and village in Kutná Hora District in the Central Bohemian Region of the Czech Republic. It has about 200 inhabitants.

== Demographics ==
Historical population
| Year | Pop. | ±% |
|---|---|---|
| 1869 | 281 | — |
| 1880 | 338 | +20.3% |
| 1890 | 306 | −9.5% |
| 1900 | 268 | −12.4% |
| 1910 | 295 | +10.1% |
| 1921 | 272 | −7.8% |
| 1930 | 260 | −4.4% |
| 1950 | 223 | −14.2% |
| 1961 | 247 | +10.8% |
| 1970 | 252 | +2.0% |
| 1980 | 215 | −14.7% |
| 1991 | 201 | −6.5% |
| 2001 | 176 | −12.4% |
| 2011 | 180 | +2.3% |
| 2021 | 169 | −6.1% |
Source: Censuses
