= Horušice =

- Municipality
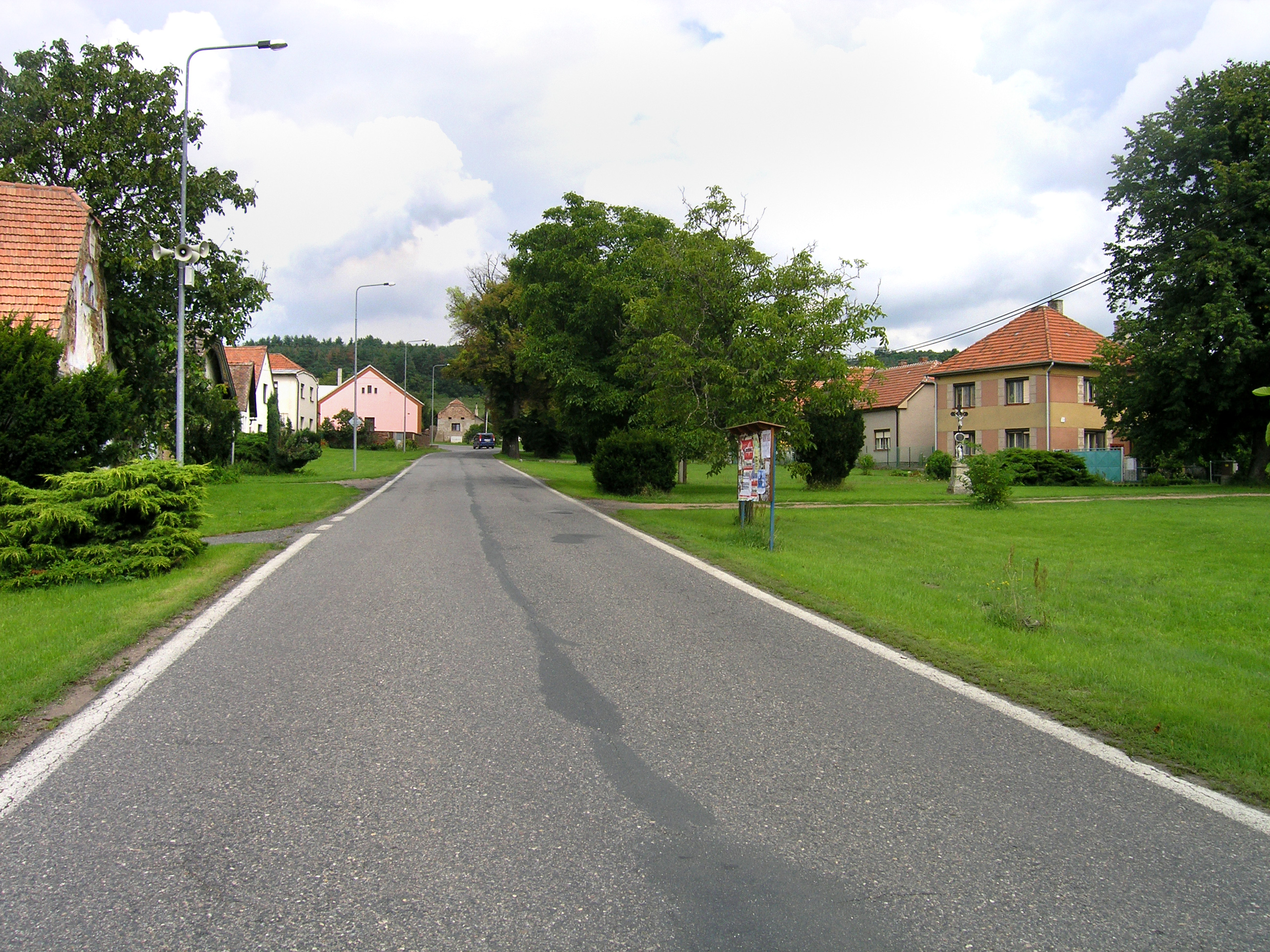
- Centre of Horušice

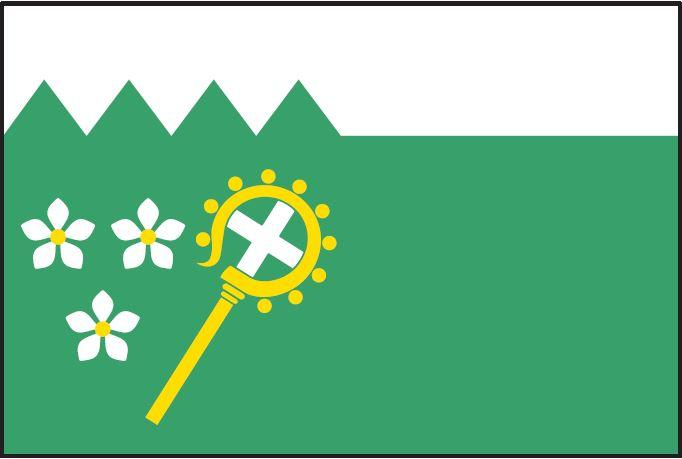
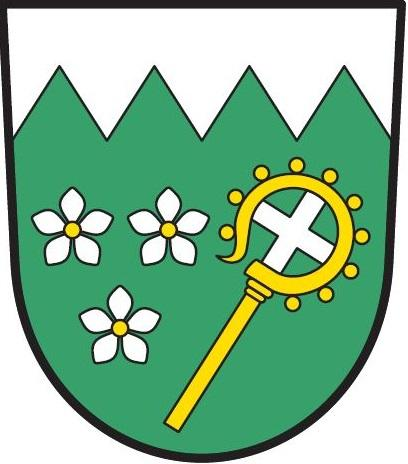
- Flag Coat of arms

- Location in the Czech Republic
- Coordinates: 49°59′48″N 15°25′44″E
- Country: Czech Republic
- Region: Central Bohemian
- District: Kutná Hora
- First mentioned: 1369

Area
  - Total: 8.48 km^{2} (3.27 sq mi)
- Elevation: 228 m (748 ft)

Population (2026-01-01)
  - Total: 165
  - Density: 19.5/km^{2} (50.4/sq mi)
- Time zone: UTC+1 (CET)
  - Summer (DST): UTC+2 (CEST)
- Postal code: 285 73
- Website: obechorusice.cz

Horušice is a municipality and village in Kutná Hora District in the Central Bohemian Region of the Czech Republic. It has about 200 inhabitants.

== Demographics ==
Historical population
Year	Pop.	±%
1869	430	—
1880	421	−2.1%
1890	432	+2.6%
1900	429	−0.7%
1910	453	+5.6%
1921	421	−7.1%
1930	397	−5.7%
1950	314	−20.9%
1961	317	+1.0%
1970	287	−9.5%
1980	244	−15.0%
1991	211	−13.5%
2001	187	−11.4%
2011	205	+9.6%
2021	179	−12.7%
Source: Censuses
