= Hostovlice =

- Municipality
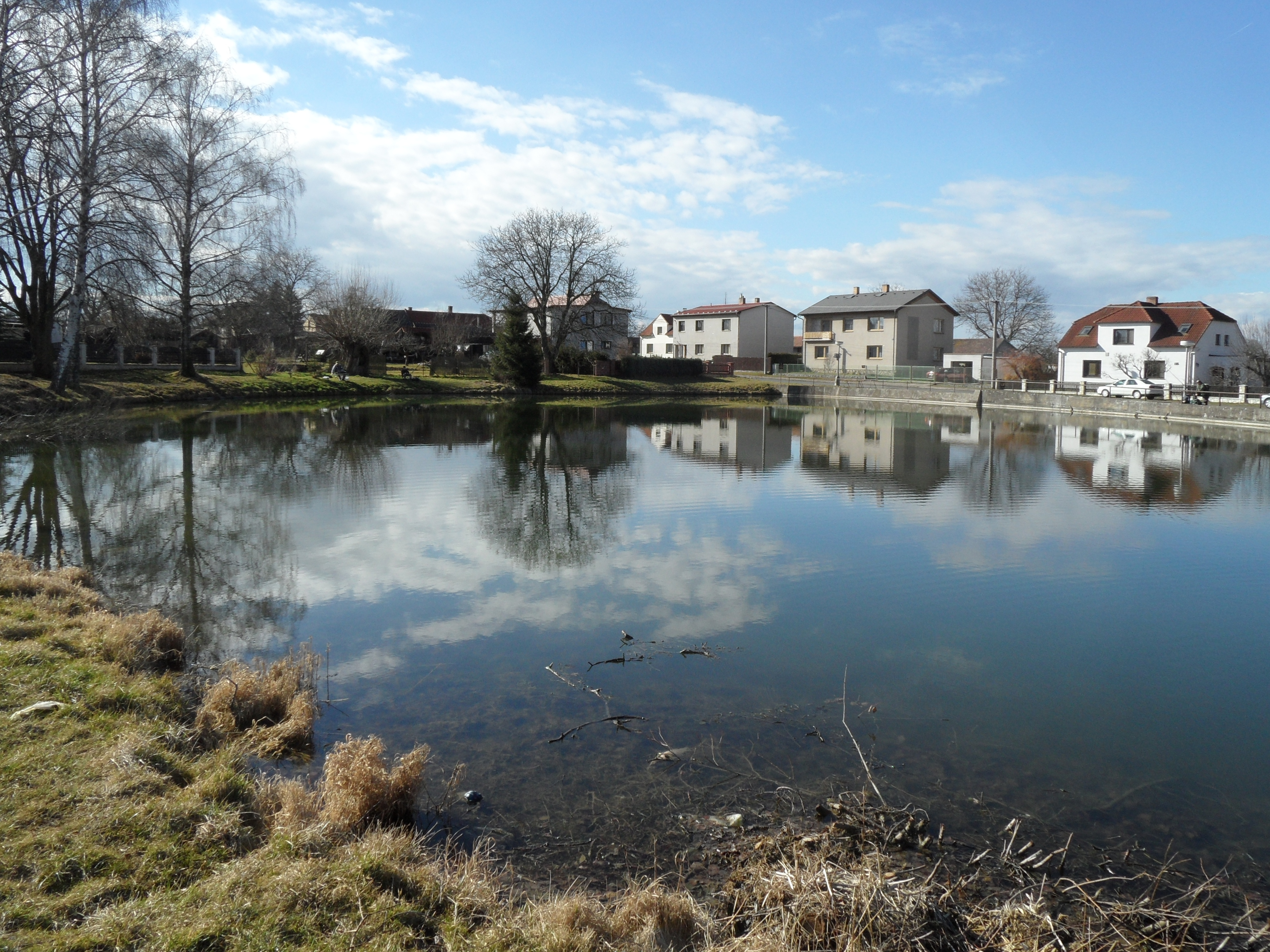
- Houses around a pond

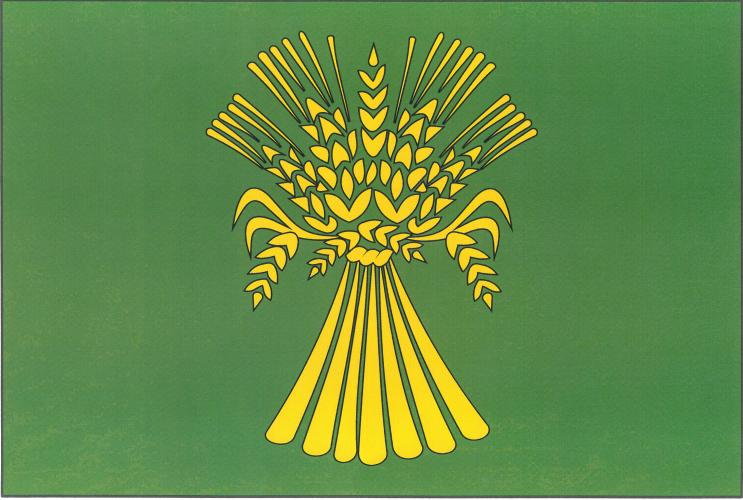
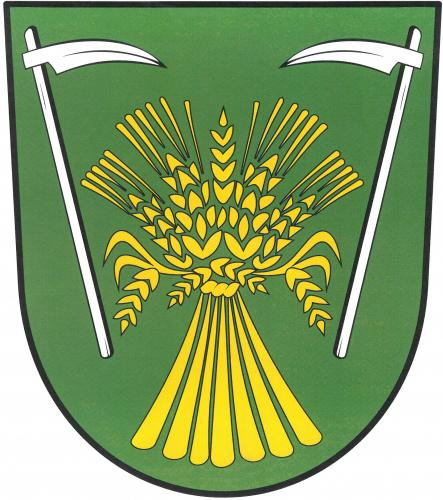
- Flag Coat of arms

- Location in the Czech Republic
- Coordinates: 49°51′37″N 15°27′59″E
- Country: Czech Republic
- Region: Central Bohemian
- District: Kutná Hora
- First mentioned: 1244

Area
  - Total: 5.85 km^{2} (2.26 sq mi)
- Elevation: 281 m (922 ft)

Population (2026-01-01)
  - Total: 250
  - Density: 43/km^{2} (110/sq mi)
- Time zone: UTC+1 (CET)
  - Summer (DST): UTC+2 (CEST)
- Postal code: 285 62
- Website: www.obec-hostovlice.cz

Hostovlice is a municipality and village in Kutná Hora District in the Central Bohemian Region of the Czech Republic. It has about 300 inhabitants.

== Demographics ==
Historical population
Year	Pop.	±%
1869	473	—
1880	584	+23.5%
1890	596	+2.1%
1900	562	−5.7%
1910	673	+19.8%
1921	708	+5.2%
1930	583	−17.7%
1950	403	−30.9%
1961	353	−12.4%
1970	351	−0.6%
1980	299	−14.8%
1991	279	−6.7%
2001	246	−11.8%
2011	253	+2.8%
2021	245	−3.2%
Source: Censuses
