= Sudějov =

- Municipality
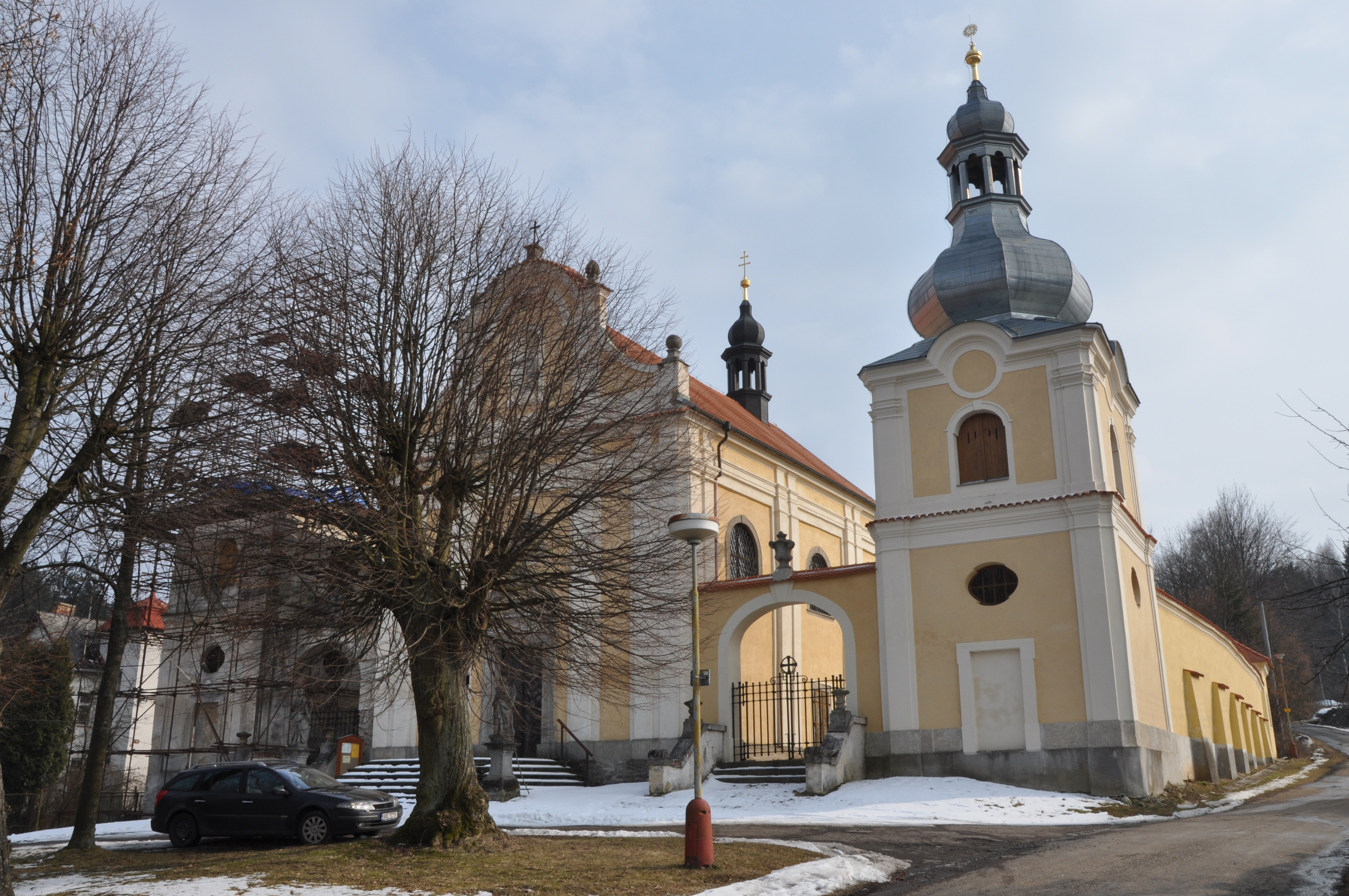
- Church of Saint Anne

- Location in the Czech Republic
- Coordinates: 49°51′39″N 15°6′14″E
- Country: Czech Republic
- Region: Central Bohemian
- District: Kutná Hora
- First mentioned: 1720

Area
  - Total: 3.92 km^{2} (1.51 sq mi)
- Elevation: 498 m (1,634 ft)

Population (2026-01-01)
  - Total: 85
  - Density: 22/km^{2} (56/sq mi)
- Time zone: UTC+1 (CET)
  - Summer (DST): UTC+2 (CEST)
- Postal code: 285 04
- Website: www.obecsudejov.cz

Sudějov is a municipality and village in Kutná Hora District in the Central Bohemian Region of the Czech Republic. It has about 90 inhabitants.

== Demographics ==
Historical population
Year	Pop.	±%
1869	275	—
1880	277	+0.7%
1890	273	−1.4%
1900	267	−2.2%
1910	241	−9.7%
1921	207	−14.1%
1930	171	−17.4%
1950	138	−19.3%
1961	117	−15.2%
1970	109	−6.8%
1980	69	−36.7%
1991	70	+1.4%
2001	60	−14.3%
2011	67	+11.7%
2021	73	+9.0%
Source: Censuses
