= Drobovice =

- Municipality
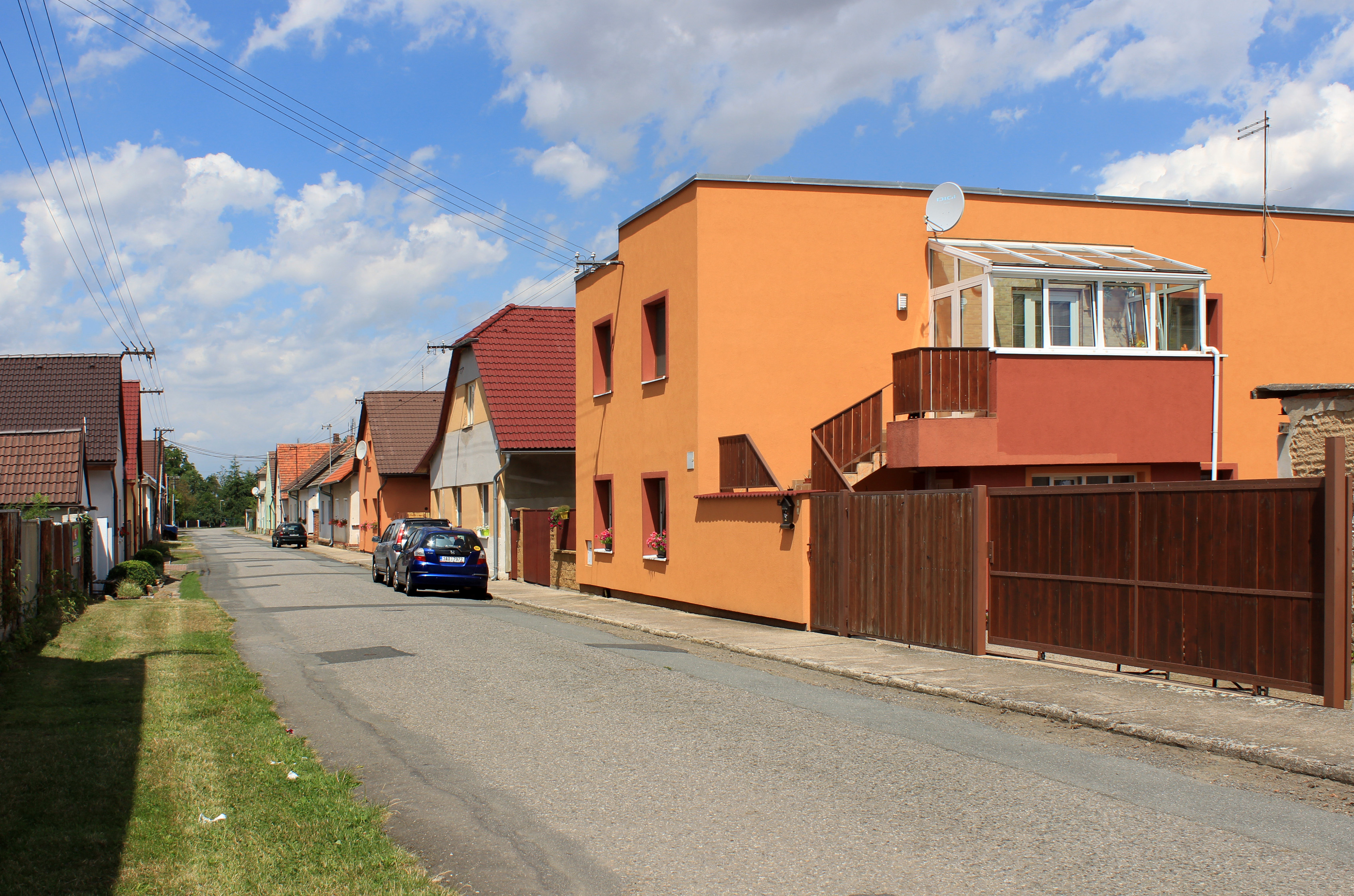
- Side street

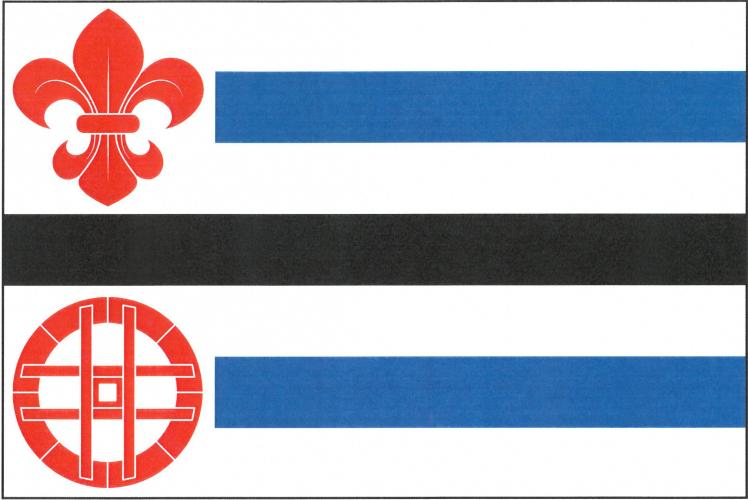
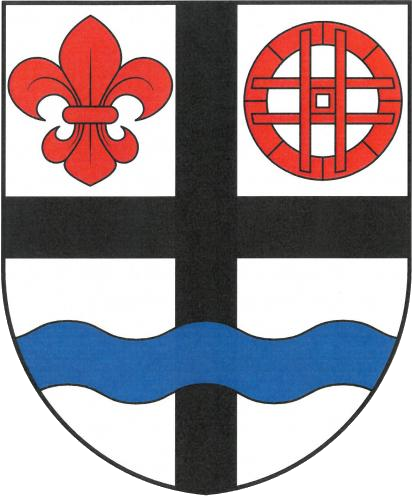
- Flag Coat of arms

- Location in the Czech Republic
- Coordinates: 49°53′22″N 15°24′49″E
- Country: Czech Republic
- Region: Central Bohemian
- District: Kutná Hora
- First mentioned: 1242

Area
  - Total: 2.83 km^{2} (1.09 sq mi)
- Elevation: 254 m (833 ft)

Population (2026-01-01)
  - Total: 384
  - Density: 136/km^{2} (351/sq mi)
- Time zone: UTC+1 (CET)
  - Summer (DST): UTC+2 (CEST)
- Postal code: 286 01
- Website: www.drobovice.cz

Drobovice is a municipality and village in Kutná Hora District in the Central Bohemian Region of the Czech Republic. It has about 400 inhabitants.

== Demographics ==
Historical population
Year	Pop.	±%
1869	436	—
1880	558	+28.0%
1890	523	−6.3%
1900	565	+8.0%
1910	577	+2.1%
1921	605	+4.9%
1930	660	+9.1%
1950	489	−25.9%
1961	459	−6.1%
1970	464	+1.1%
1980	438	−5.6%
1991	395	−9.8%
2001	368	−6.8%
2011	375	+1.9%
2021	383	+2.1%
Source: Censuses
