= Potěhy =

- Municipality
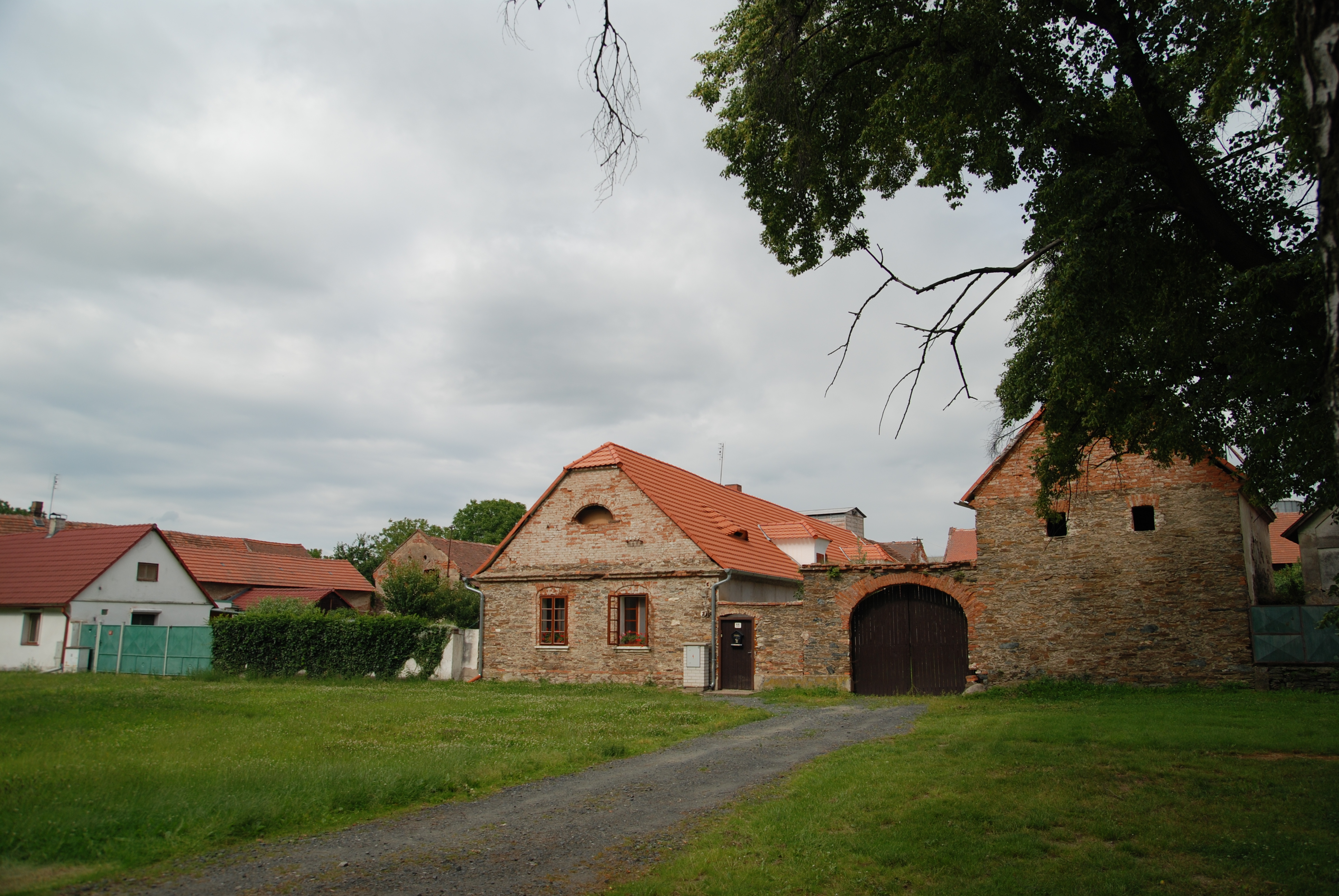
- Centre of Potěhy

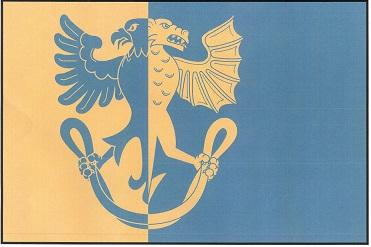
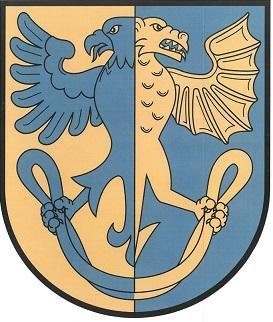
- Flag Coat of arms

- Location in the Czech Republic
- Coordinates: 49°52′10″N 15°25′13″E
- Country: Czech Republic
- Region: Central Bohemian
- District: Kutná Hora
- First mentioned: 1242

Area
  - Total: 4.99 km^{2} (1.93 sq mi)
- Elevation: 294 m (965 ft)

Population (2026-01-01)
  - Total: 651
  - Density: 130/km^{2} (338/sq mi)
- Time zone: UTC+1 (CET)
  - Summer (DST): UTC+2 (CEST)
- Postal code: 285 63
- Website: www.potehy.cz

Potěhy is a municipality and village in Kutná Hora District in the Central Bohemian Region of the Czech Republic. It has about 700 inhabitants.

== Demographics ==
Historical population
Year	Pop.	±%
1869	730	—
1880	761	+4.2%
1890	777	+2.1%
1900	869	+11.8%
1910	815	−6.2%
1921	840	+3.1%
1930	726	−13.6%
1950	529	−27.1%
1961	539	+1.9%
1970	498	−7.6%
1980	567	+13.9%
1991	543	−4.2%
2001	630	+16.0%
2011	609	−3.3%
2021	620	+1.8%
Source: Censuses
