= Kutná Hora District =

Kutná Hora District Okres Kutná Hora
- District
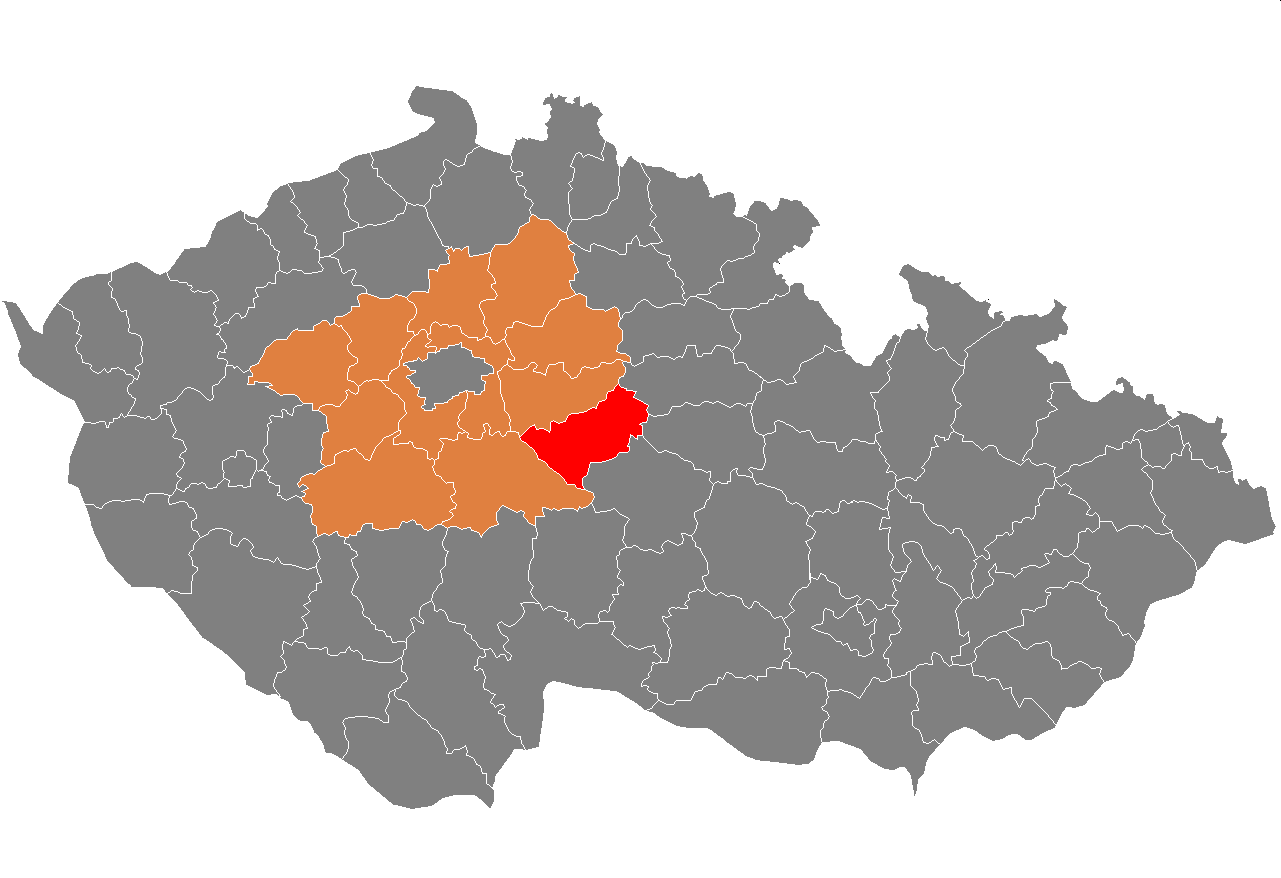
- Location in the Central Bohemian Region within the Czech Republic
- Coordinates: 49°52′N 15°16′E
- Country: Czech Republic
- Region: Central Bohemian
- Capital: Kutná Hora

Area
  - Total: 917.35 km^{2} (354.19 sq mi)

Population (2026)
  - Total: 78,903
  - Density: 86.012/km^{2} (222.77/sq mi)
- Time zone: UTC+1 (CET)
  - Summer (DST): UTC+2 (CEST)
- Municipalities: 88
- * Towns: 4
- * Market towns: 7

Kutná Hora District (Czech: okres Kutná Hora) is a district in the Central Bohemian Region of the Czech Republic. Its capital is the town of Kutná Hora.

== Administrative division ==
Kutná Hora District is divided into two administrative districts of municipalities with extended competence: Kutná Hora and Čáslav.

=== List of municipalities ===
Towns are marked in bold and market towns in italics:

Adamov - Bernardov - Bílé Podolí - Bludov - Bohdaneč - Brambory - Bratčice - Čáslav - Čejkovice - Černíny - Červené Janovice - Čestín - Chabeřice - Chlístovice - Chotusice - Církvice - Dobrovítov - Dolní Pohleď - Drobovice - Hlízov - Horka I - Horka II - Horky - Horušice - Hostovlice - Hraběšín - Kácov - Kluky - Kobylnice - Košice - Krchleby - Křesetice - Kutná Hora - Ledečko - Malešov - Miskovice - Močovice - Nepoměřice - Nové Dvory - Okřesaneč - Onomyšl - Opatovice I - Paběnice - Pertoltice - Petrovice I - Petrovice II - Podveky - Potěhy - Rašovice - Rataje nad Sázavou - Rohozec - Řendějov - Samopše - Schořov - Šebestěnice - Semtěš - Slavošov - Soběšín - Souňov - Staňkovice - Starkoč - Štipoklasy - Suchdol - Sudějov - Svatý Mikuláš - Třebešice - Třebětín - Třebonín - Tupadly - Uhlířské Janovice - Úmonín - Úžice - Vavřinec - Vidice - Vinaře - Vlačice - Vlastějovice - Vlkaneč - Vodranty - Vrdy - Záboří nad Labem - Žáky - Zbizuby - Zbraslavice - Zbýšov - Žehušice - Žleby - Zruč nad Sázavou

== Geography ==
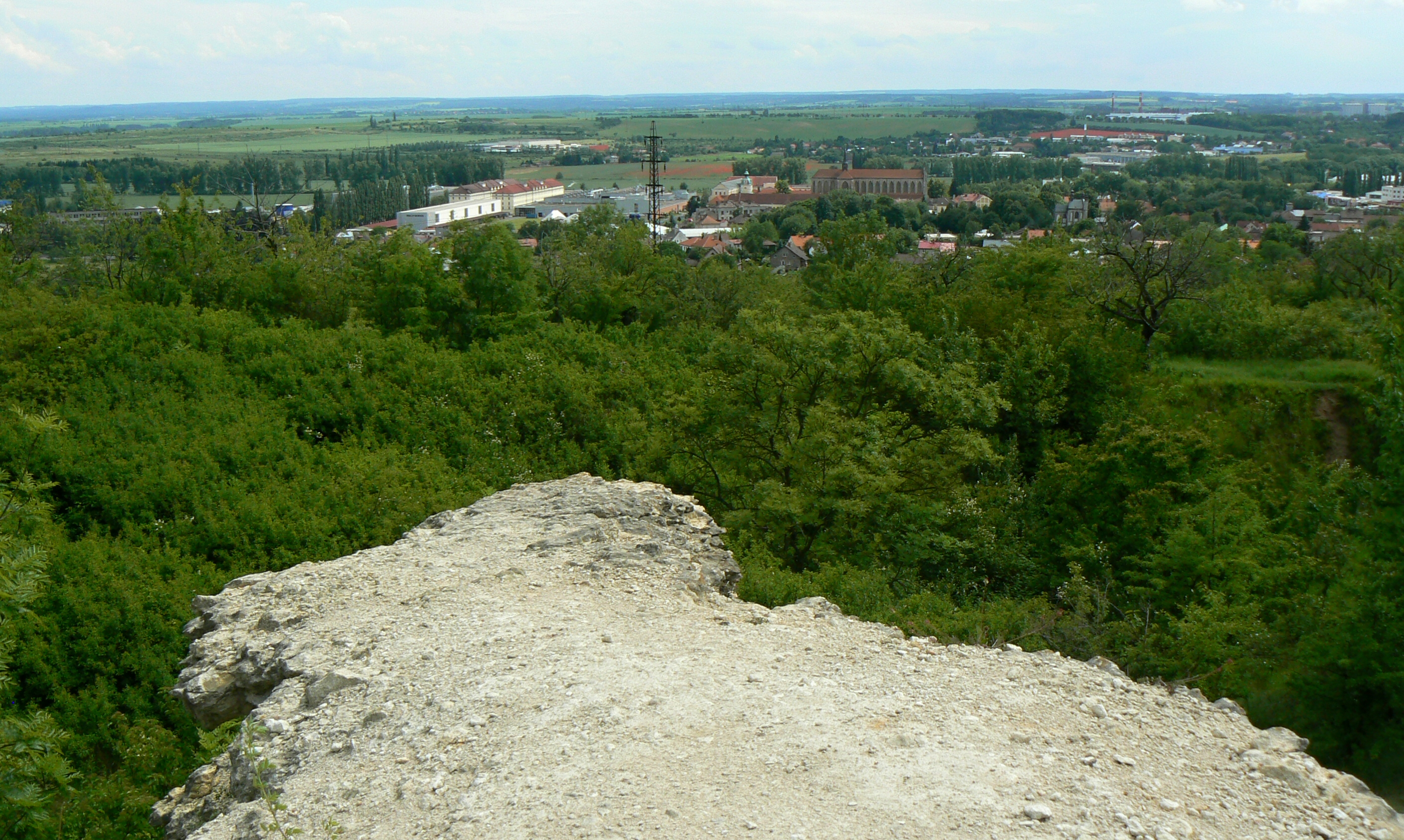
Landscape around Kutná Hora

The northeast of the district is rather flat with agricultural land, the southwest is dominated by hilly forested terrain. The territory extends into four geomorphological mesoregions: Upper Sázava Hills (most of the territory), Central Elbe Table (north), Vlašim Uplands (small part in the southwest) and Iron Mountains (small part in the north). The highest point of the district is the hill Březina in Chlístovice with an elevation of 555 m (1,821 ft), the lowest point is the river bed of the Klejnárka in Hlízov at 198 m (650 ft).

From the total district area of 917.4 km^{2} (354.2 sq mi), agricultural land occupies 594.5 km^{2} (229.5 sq mi), forests occupy 219.2 km^{2} (84.6 sq mi), and water area occupies 17.4 km^{2} (6.7 sq mi). Forests cover 23.9% of the district's area.

The most important rivers in the northern part of the district are the Elbe which, however, crosses the territory only briefly, and its tributaries: the Doubrava and Klejnárka. The southern part is drained by the Sázava River. The largest bodies of water are Švihov Reservoir, although it only partially extends into the Kutná Hora District, and Vavřinecký Pond with an area of 72 ha (180 acres).

There are no large-scale protected areas.

== Demographics ==
Historical population

Year	Pop.	±%
1869	102,587	—
1880	105,697	+3.0%
1890	105,568	−0.1%
1900	108,024	+2.3%
1910	106,420	−1.5%

Year	Pop.	±%
1921	103,321	−2.9%
1930	98,817	−4.4%
1950	82,634	−16.4%
1961	83,427	+1.0%
1970	79,858	−4.3%

Year	Pop.	±%
1980	78,333	−1.9%
1991	75,250	−3.9%
2001	73,628	−2.2%
2011	73,404	−0.3%
2021	74,918	+2.1%

Source: Censuses

=== Most populous municipalities ===
Name	Population	Area (km^{2})
Kutná Hora	21,787	29
Čáslav	10,387	34
Zruč nad Sázavou	4,777	36
Uhlířské Janovice	3,114	27
Vrdy	3,104	11
Zbraslavice	1,426	63
Žleby	1,423	25
Církvice	1,350	24
Miskovice	1,165	19
Suchdol	1,108	19

== Economy ==
The largest employers with headquarters in Kutná Hora District and at least 500 employees are:

Economic entity	Location	Number of employees	Main activity
Foxconn Technology CZ	Kutná Hora	1,500–1,999	Manufacture of electronic components
Philip Morris ČR	Kutná Hora	1,000–1,499	Manufacture of tobacco products
Goldbeck Prefabeton	Vrdy	1,000–1,499	Manufacture of concrete products

== Transport ==
There is no motorway in the district territory, although the D1 motorway from Prague to Brno runs just beyond the southwestern border of the district. The most important road that passes through the district is the I/38 from Jihlava to Kolín.

== Sights ==
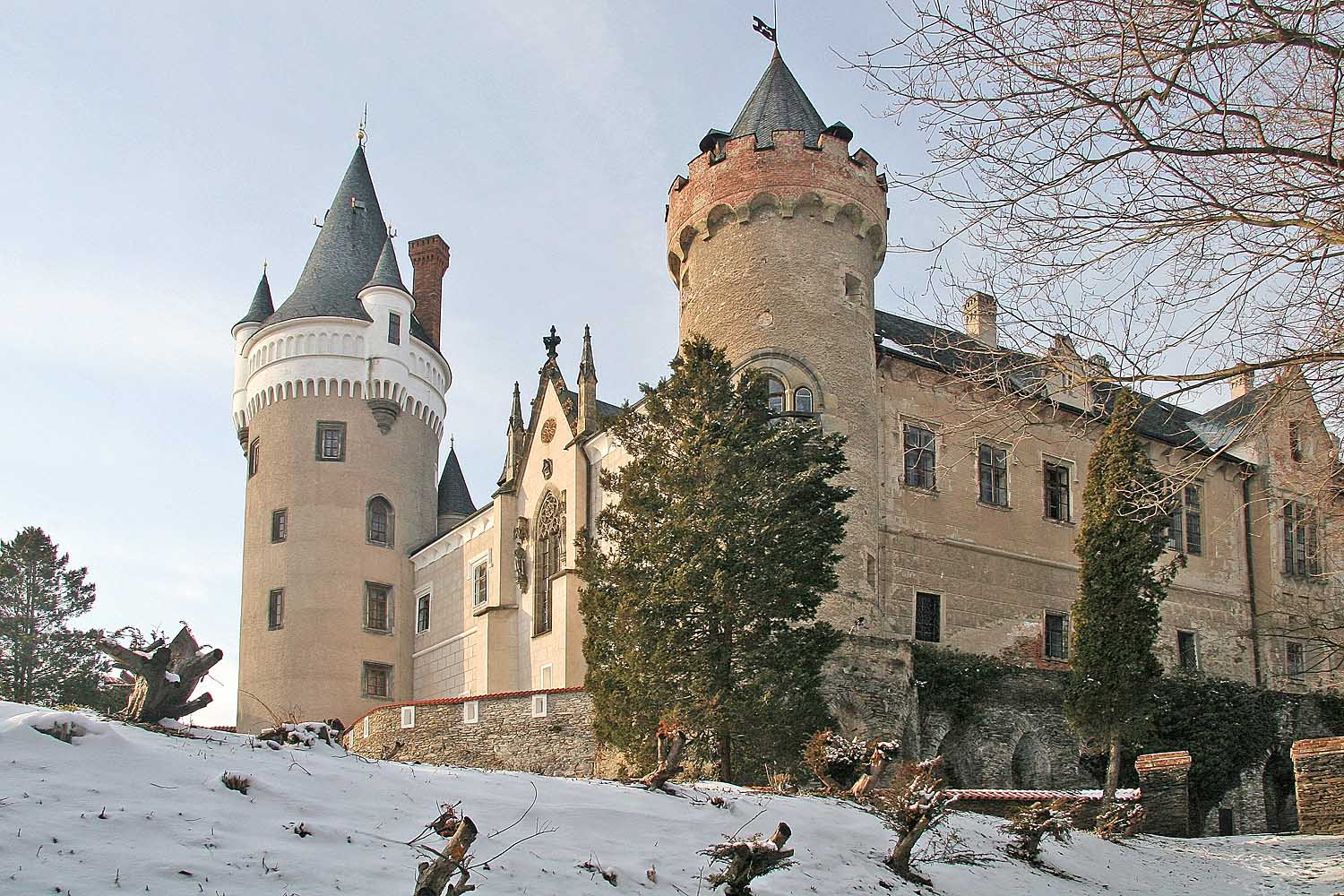
Žleby Castle

The historic centre of Kutná Hora, including the Sedlec Abbey and its ossuary, was designated a UNESCO World Heritage Site in 1995 because of its outstanding architecture and its influence on subsequent architectural developments in other Central European city centres.

The most important monuments in the district, protected as national cultural monuments, are:

- Italian Court in Kutná Hora
- Church of Saint Barbara in Kutná Hora
- Kačina Castle
- Žleby Castle
- Church of Saint James the Great in Církvice-Jakub
- Church of the Assumption of Our Lady and Saint John the Baptist in Kutná Hora-Sedlec
- Chapel of All Saints with ossuary in Kutná Hora-Sedlec

The best-preserved settlements and landscapes, protected as monument reservations and monument zones, are:

- Kutná Hora (monument reservation)
- Čáslav
- Malešov
- Nové Dvory
- Rataje nad Sázavou
- Losiny
- Landscape around Žehušice, including the Deer Park Žehušice and Kačina castle park

The most visited tourist destinations are the Church of Saint Barbara in Kutná Hora, Sedlec Ossuary in Kutná Hora, and Kačina Castle with the Czech Countryside Museum.
