= Třebětín =

- Municipality
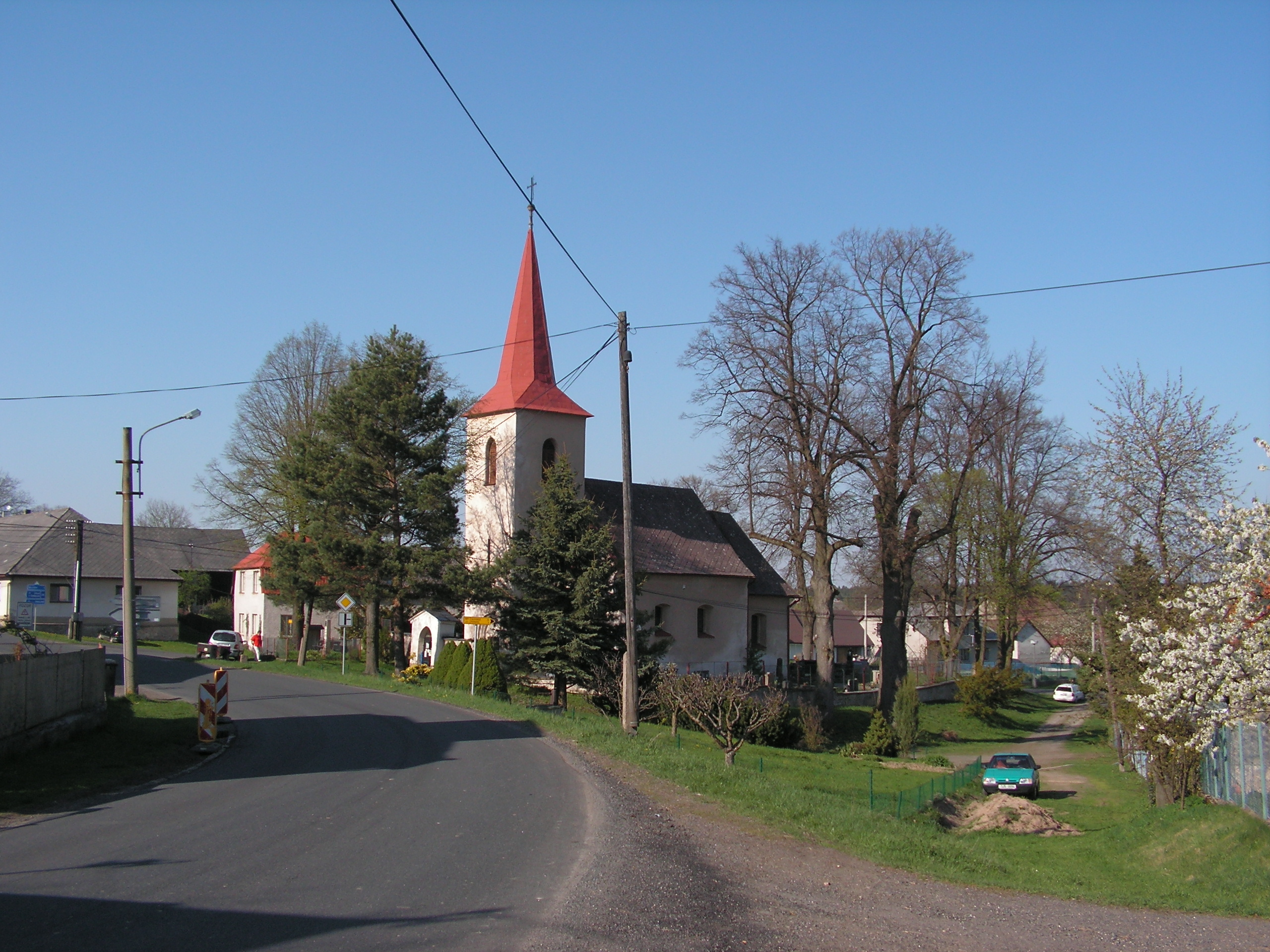
- Church of the Visitation of the Virgin Mary

- Location in the Czech Republic
- Coordinates: 49°46′15″N 15°16′10″E
- Country: Czech Republic
- Region: Central Bohemian
- District: Kutná Hora
- First mentioned: 1352

Area
  - Total: 12.40 km^{2} (4.79 sq mi)
- Elevation: 559 m (1,834 ft)

Population (2026-01-01)
  - Total: 100
  - Density: 8.1/km^{2} (21/sq mi)
- Time zone: UTC+1 (CET)
  - Summer (DST): UTC+2 (CEST)
- Postal codes: 285 22, 286 01
- Website: www.trebetin.cz

Třebětín is a municipality and village in Kutná Hora District in the Central Bohemian Region of the Czech Republic. It has about 100 inhabitants.

== Administrative division ==
Třebětín consists of three municipal parts (in brackets population according to the 2021 census):

- Třebětín (69)
- Hostkovice (18)
- Víckovice (34)

== Demographics ==
Historical population
Year	Pop.	±%
1869	643	—
1880	592	−7.9%
1890	538	−9.1%
1900	450	−16.4%
1910	457	+1.6%
1921	457	+0.0%
1930	423	−7.4%
1950	295	−30.3%
1961	265	−10.2%
1970	231	−12.8%
1980	198	−14.3%
1991	154	−22.2%
2001	131	−14.9%
2011	108	−17.6%
2021	121	+12.0%
Source: Censuses
