= Hlízov =

- Municipality
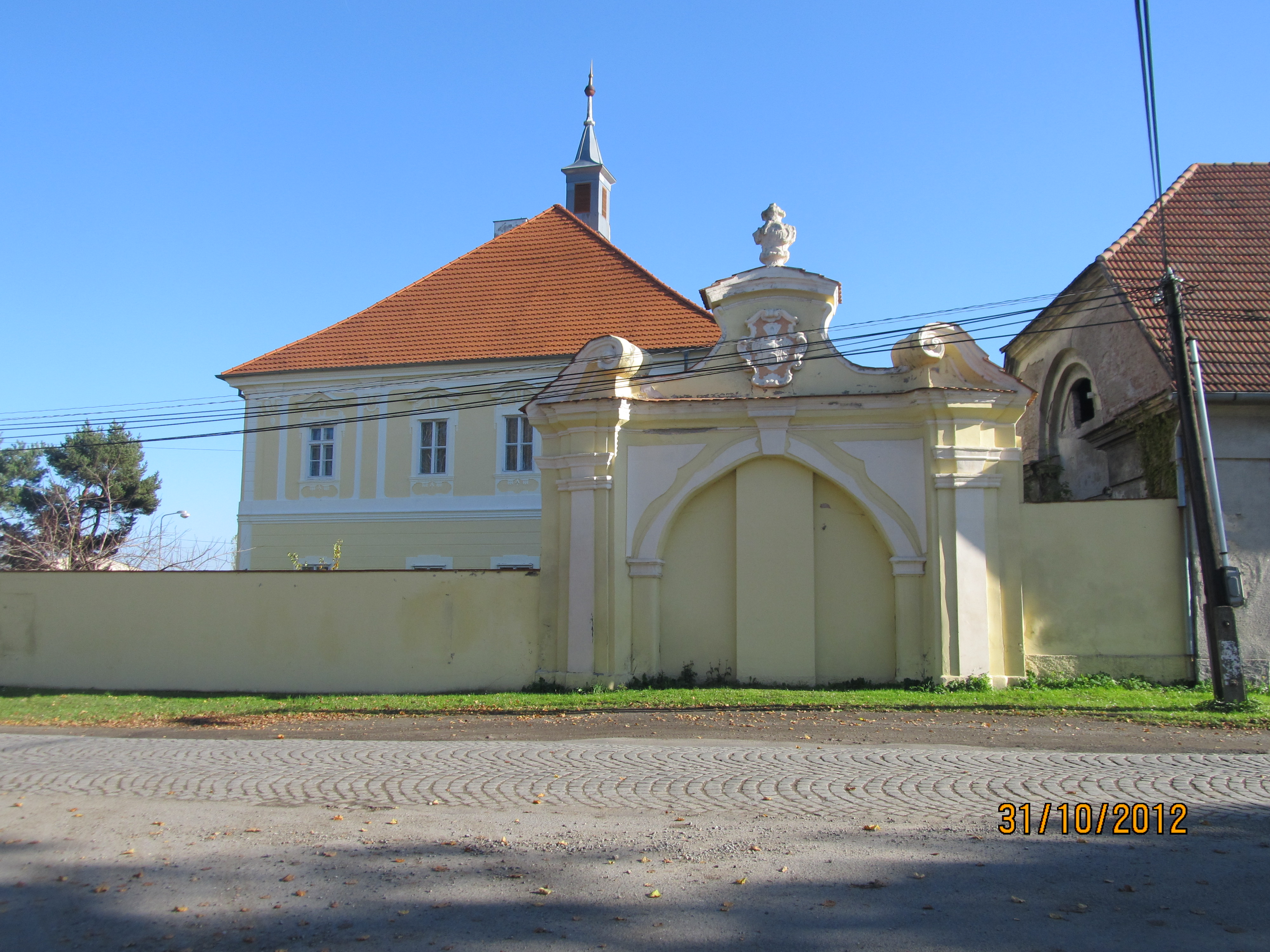
- Baroque castle

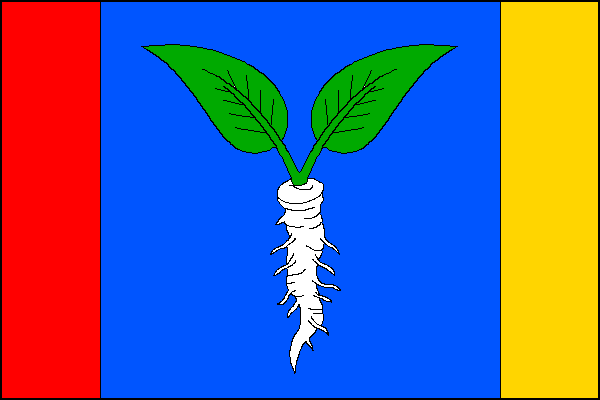
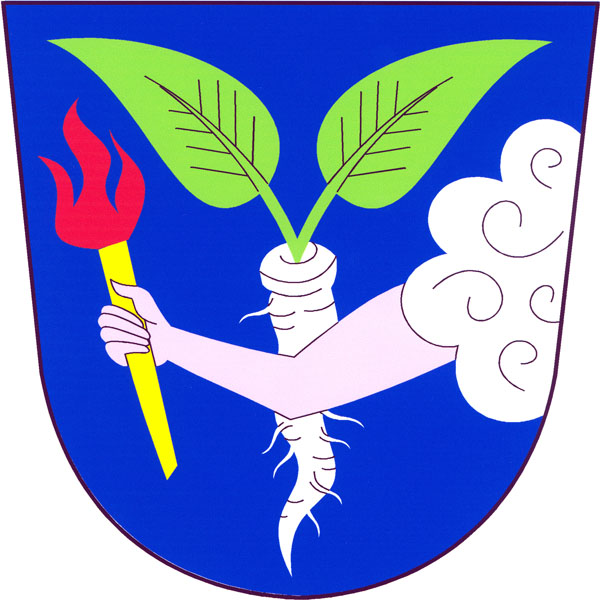
- Flag Coat of arms

- Location in the Czech Republic
- Coordinates: 49°59′6″N 15°17′43″E
- Country: Czech Republic
- Region: Central Bohemian
- District: Kutná Hora
- First mentioned: 1142

Area
  - Total: 6.02 km^{2} (2.32 sq mi)
- Elevation: 202 m (663 ft)

Population (2026-01-01)
  - Total: 680
  - Density: 110/km^{2} (290/sq mi)
- Time zone: UTC+1 (CET)
  - Summer (DST): UTC+2 (CEST)
- Postal code: 285 32
- Website: www.obec-hlizov.cz

Hlízov is a municipality and village in Kutná Hora District in the Central Bohemian Region of the Czech Republic. It has about 700 inhabitants.

== Demographics ==
Historical population
Year	Pop.	±%
1869	755	—
1880	694	−8.1%
1890	765	+10.2%
1900	844	+10.3%
1910	773	−8.4%
1921	732	−5.3%
1930	799	+9.2%
1950	564	−29.4%
1961	549	−2.7%
1970	521	−5.1%
1980	502	−3.6%
1991	426	−15.1%
2001	415	−2.6%
2011	536	+29.2%
2021	627	+17.0%
Source: Censuses
