= Opatovice I =

- Municipality
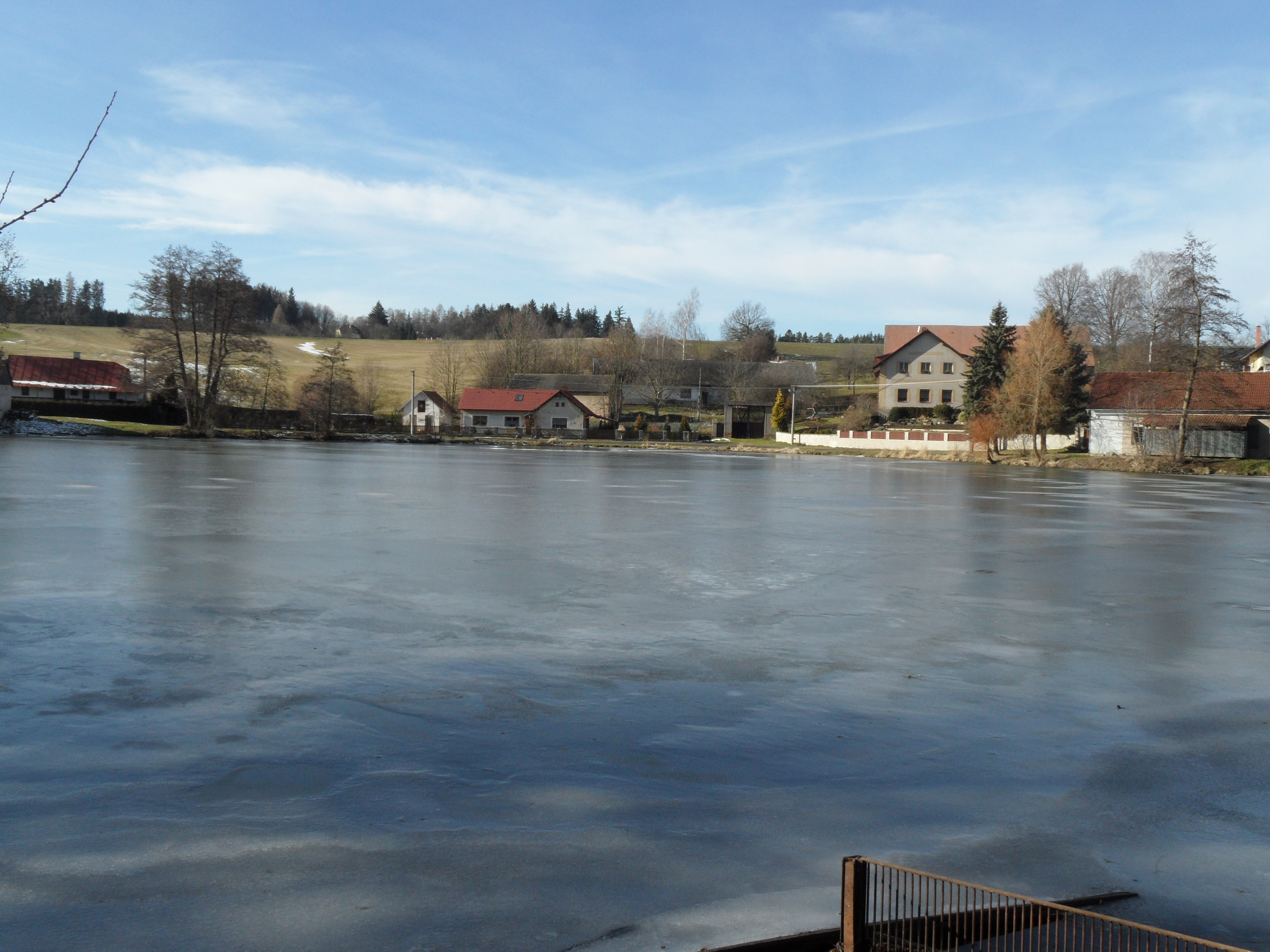
- The fishpond Mlýnský rybník

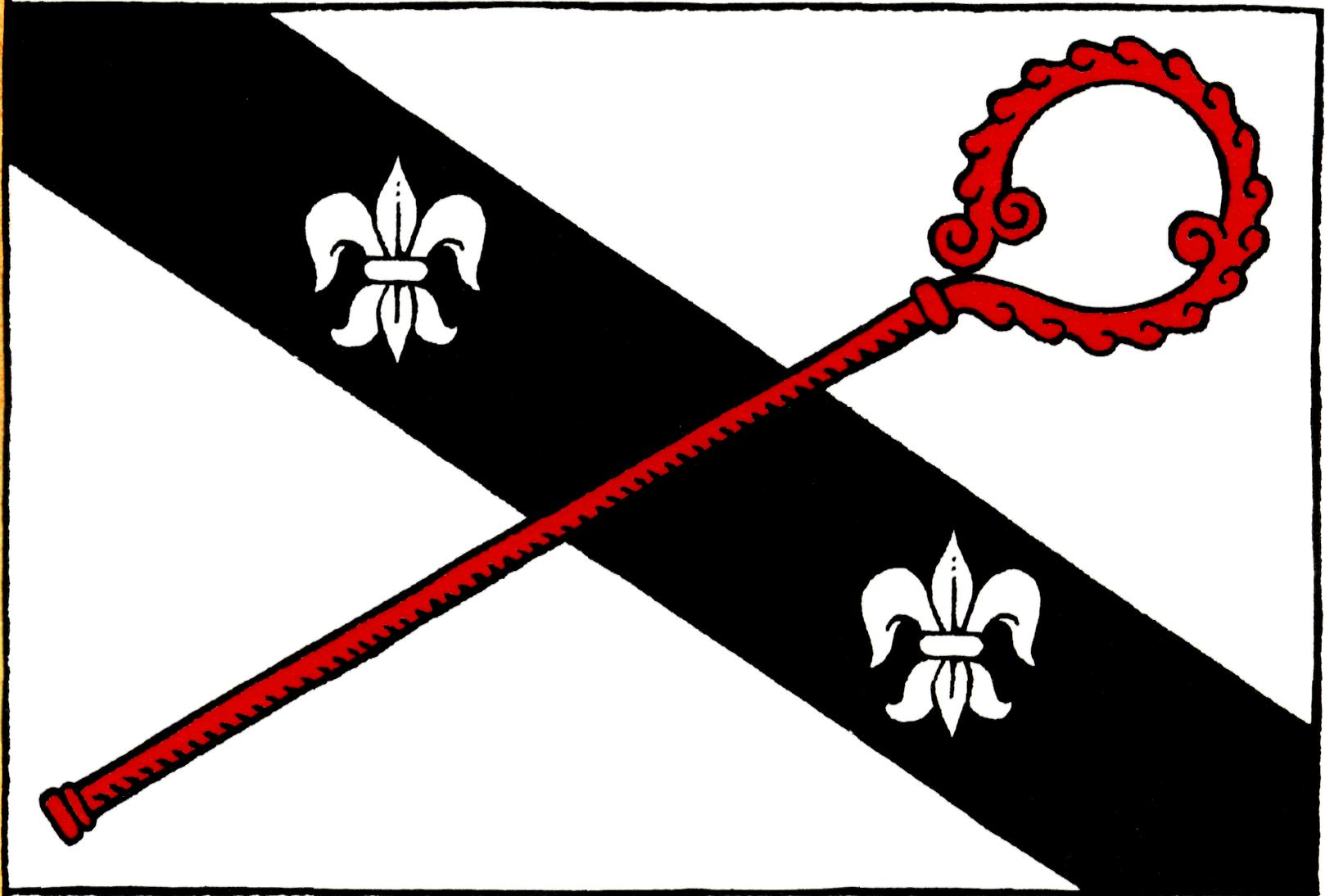
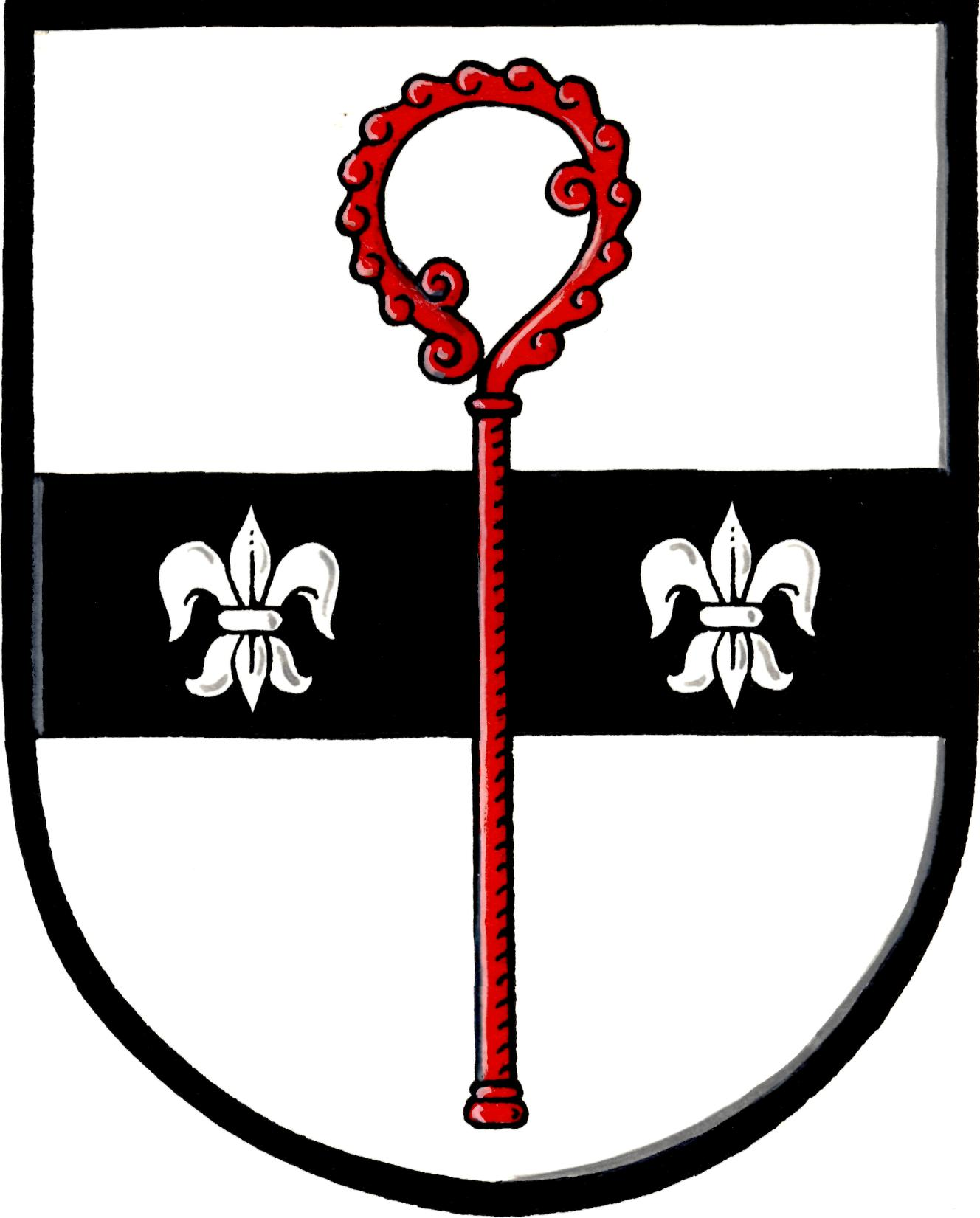
- Flag Coat of arms

- Location in the Czech Republic
- Coordinates: 49°51′19″N 15°14′55″E
- Country: Czech Republic
- Region: Central Bohemian
- District: Kutná Hora
- First mentioned: 1344

Area
  - Total: 6.34 km^{2} (2.45 sq mi)
- Elevation: 405 m (1,329 ft)

Population (2026-01-01)
  - Total: 190
  - Density: 30/km^{2} (78/sq mi)
- Time zone: UTC+1 (CET)
  - Summer (DST): UTC+2 (CEST)
- Postal code: 286 01
- Website: www.opatovice1.cz

Opatovice I is a municipality and village in Kutná Hora District in the Central Bohemian Region of the Czech Republic. It has about 200 inhabitants.

The Roman numeral in the name serves to distinguish it from the nearby village of the same name, Opatovice II within Uhlířské Janovice.

== Demographics ==
Historical population
Year	Pop.	±%
1869	472	—
1880	507	+7.4%
1890	482	−4.9%
1900	446	−7.5%
1910	430	−3.6%
1921	438	+1.9%
1930	386	−11.9%
1950	294	−23.8%
1961	238	−19.0%
1970	187	−21.4%
1980	141	−24.6%
1991	114	−19.1%
2001	104	−8.8%
2011	117	+12.5%
2021	140	+19.7%
Source: Censuses
