= Rohozec (Kutná Hora District) =

- Municipality
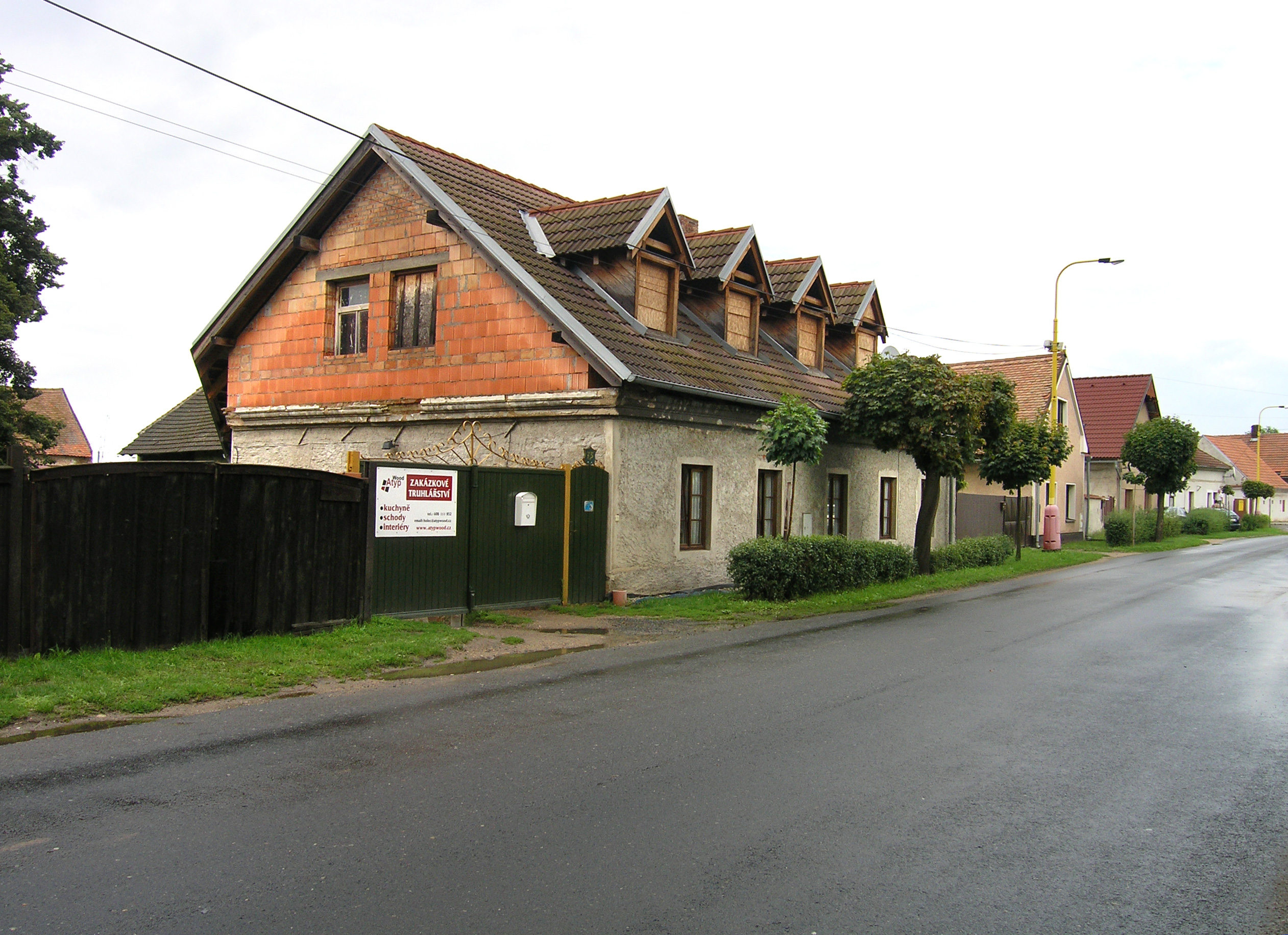
- Main street

- Flag Coat of arms

- Location in the Czech Republic
- Coordinates: 49°58′34″N 15°23′5″E
- Country: Czech Republic
- Region: Central Bohemian
- District: Kutná Hora
- First mentioned: 1407

Area
  - Total: 5.31 km^{2} (2.05 sq mi)
- Elevation: 218 m (715 ft)

Population (2026-01-01)
  - Total: 319
  - Density: 60.1/km^{2} (156/sq mi)
- Time zone: UTC+1 (CET)
  - Summer (DST): UTC+2 (CEST)
- Postal code: 284 01
- Website: www.obecrohozec.cz

Rohozec is a municipality and village in Kutná Hora District in the Central Bohemian Region of the Czech Republic. It has about 300 inhabitants.

== Demographics ==
Historical population
Year	Pop.	±%
1869	485	—
1880	567	+16.9%
1890	577	+1.8%
1900	515	−10.7%
1910	538	+4.5%
1921	551	+2.4%
1930	475	−13.8%
1950	376	−20.8%
1961	323	−14.1%
1970	295	−8.7%
1980	283	−4.1%
1991	242	−14.5%
2001	256	+5.8%
2011	284	+10.9%
2021	336	+18.3%
Source: Censuses
