= Dolní Pohleď =

- Municipality
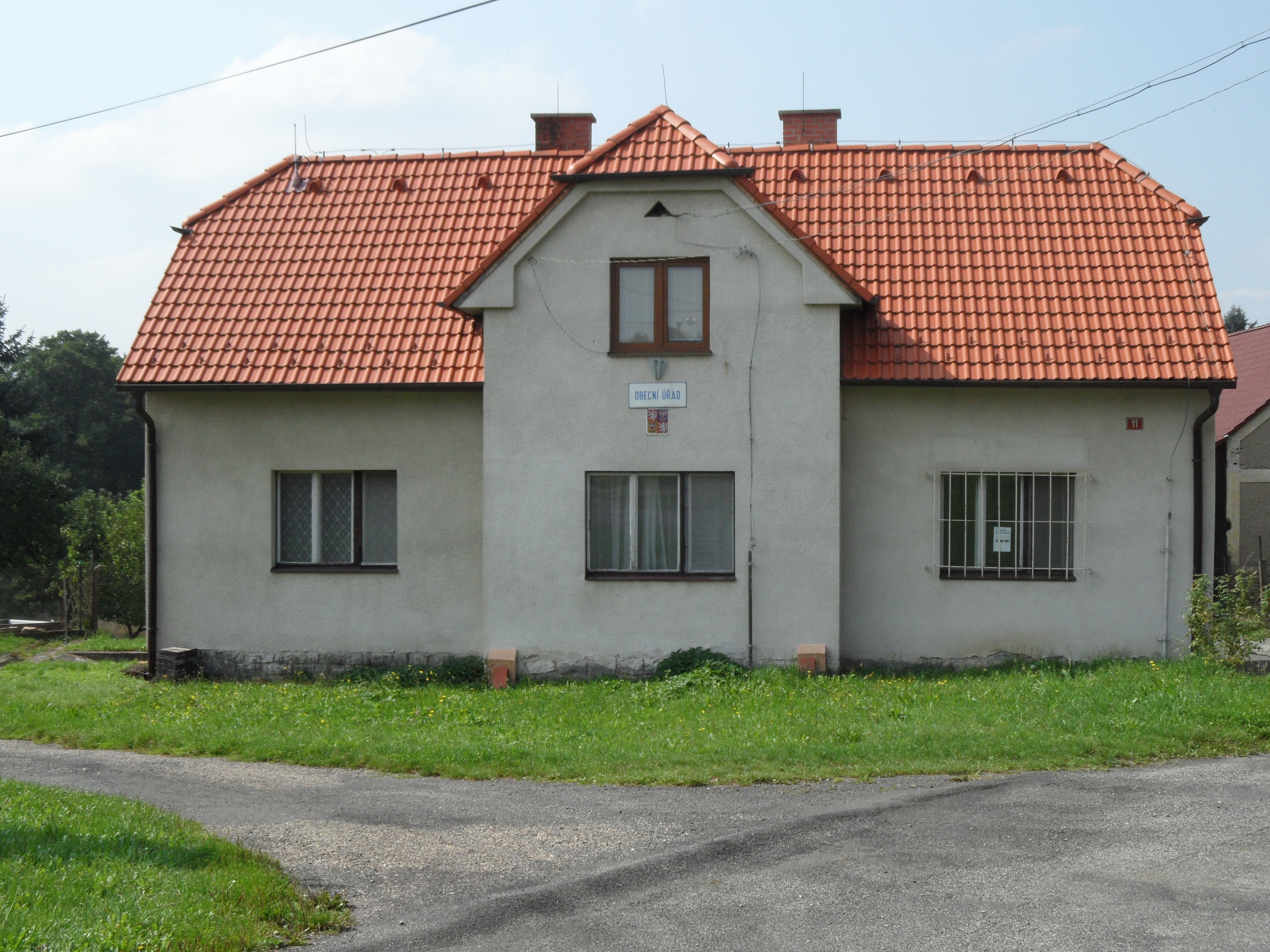
- Municipal office

- Location in the Czech Republic
- Coordinates: 49°44′37″N 15°8′0″E
- Country: Czech Republic
- Region: Central Bohemian
- District: Kutná Hora
- First mentioned: 1399

Area
  - Total: 3.60 km^{2} (1.39 sq mi)
- Elevation: 389 m (1,276 ft)

Population (2026-01-01)
  - Total: 126
  - Density: 35.0/km^{2} (90.6/sq mi)
- Time zone: UTC+1 (CET)
  - Summer (DST): UTC+2 (CEST)
- Postal code: 285 22
- Website: www.dolnipohled.cz

Dolní Pohleď is a municipality and village in Kutná Hora District in the Central Bohemian Region of the Czech Republic. It has about 100 inhabitants.

== Administrative division ==
Dolní Pohleď consists of two municipal parts (in brackets population according to the 2021 census):

- Dolní Pohleď (85)
- Měchonice (14)

== Demographics ==
Historical population
Year	Pop.	±%
1869	258	—
1880	226	−12.4%
1890	268	+18.6%
1900	220	−17.9%
1910	211	−4.1%
1921	180	−14.7%
1930	164	−8.9%
1950	131	−20.1%
1961	167	+27.5%
1970	142	−15.0%
1980	126	−11.3%
1991	119	−5.6%
2001	96	−19.3%
2011	86	−10.4%
2021	99	+15.1%
Source: Censuses
