= Krchleby (Kutná Hora District) =

- Municipality
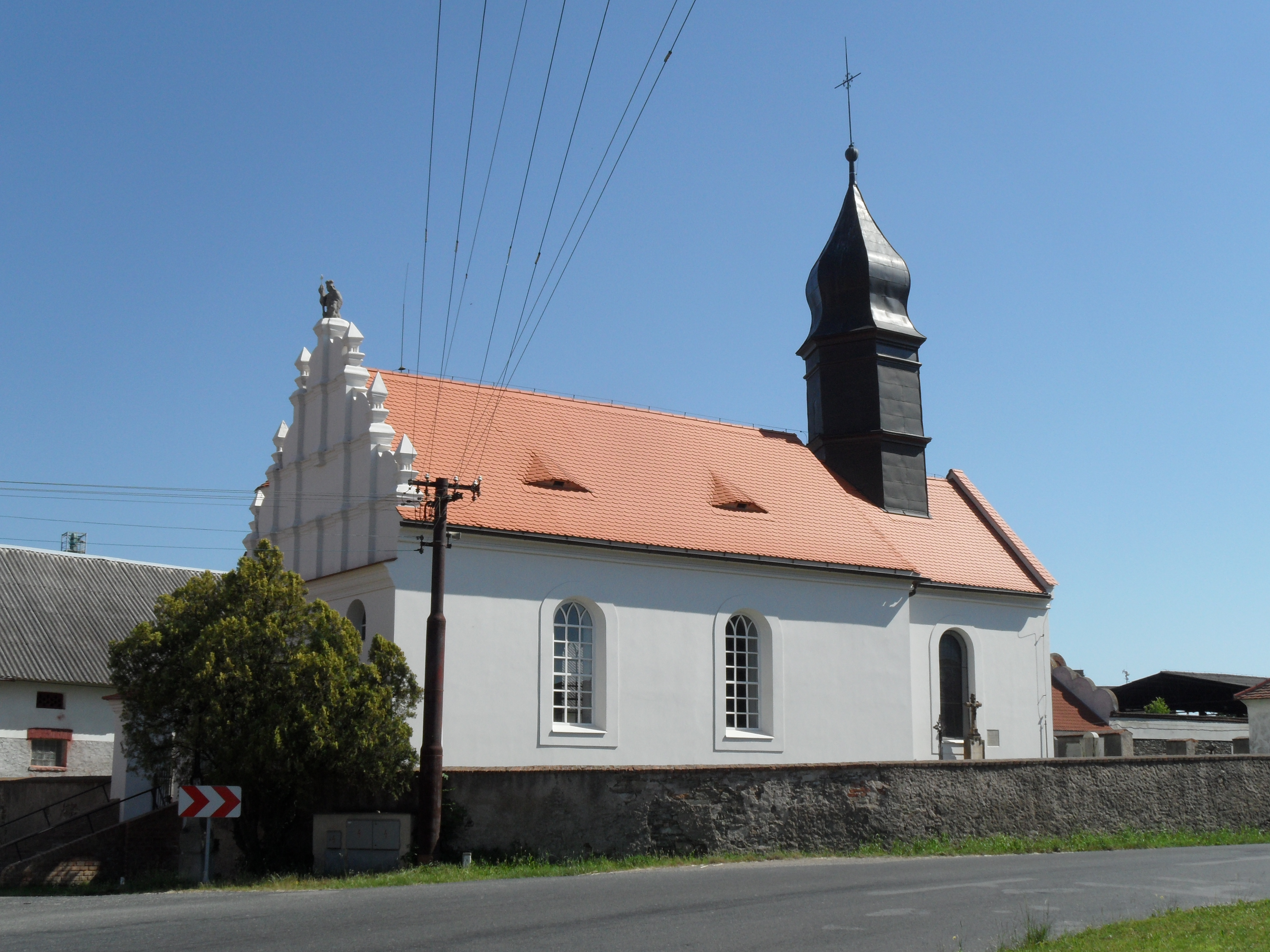
- Church of Saint Wenceslaus

- Location in the Czech Republic
- Coordinates: 49°53′20″N 15°21′1″E
- Country: Czech Republic
- Region: Central Bohemian
- District: Kutná Hora
- First mentioned: 1257

Area
  - Total: 6.00 km^{2} (2.32 sq mi)
- Elevation: 277 m (909 ft)

Population (2026-01-01)
  - Total: 406
  - Density: 67.7/km^{2} (175/sq mi)
- Time zone: UTC+1 (CET)
  - Summer (DST): UTC+2 (CEST)
- Postal code: 286 01
- Website: www.krchleby-kh.cz

Krchleby is a municipality and village in Kutná Hora District in the Central Bohemian Region of the Czech Republic. It has about 400 inhabitants.

== Administrative division ==
Krchleby consists of two municipal parts (in brackets population according to the 2021 census):

- Krchleby (361)
- Chedrbí (59)

== Demographics ==
Historical population
Year	Pop.	±%
1869	741	—
1880	822	+10.9%
1890	842	+2.4%
1900	772	−8.3%
1910	650	−15.8%
1921	630	−3.1%
1930	613	−2.7%
1950	505	−17.6%
1961	526	+4.2%
1970	498	−5.3%
1980	490	−1.6%
1991	407	−16.9%
2001	387	−4.9%
2011	384	−0.8%
2021	420	+9.4%
Source: Censuses
