= Onomyšl =

- Municipality
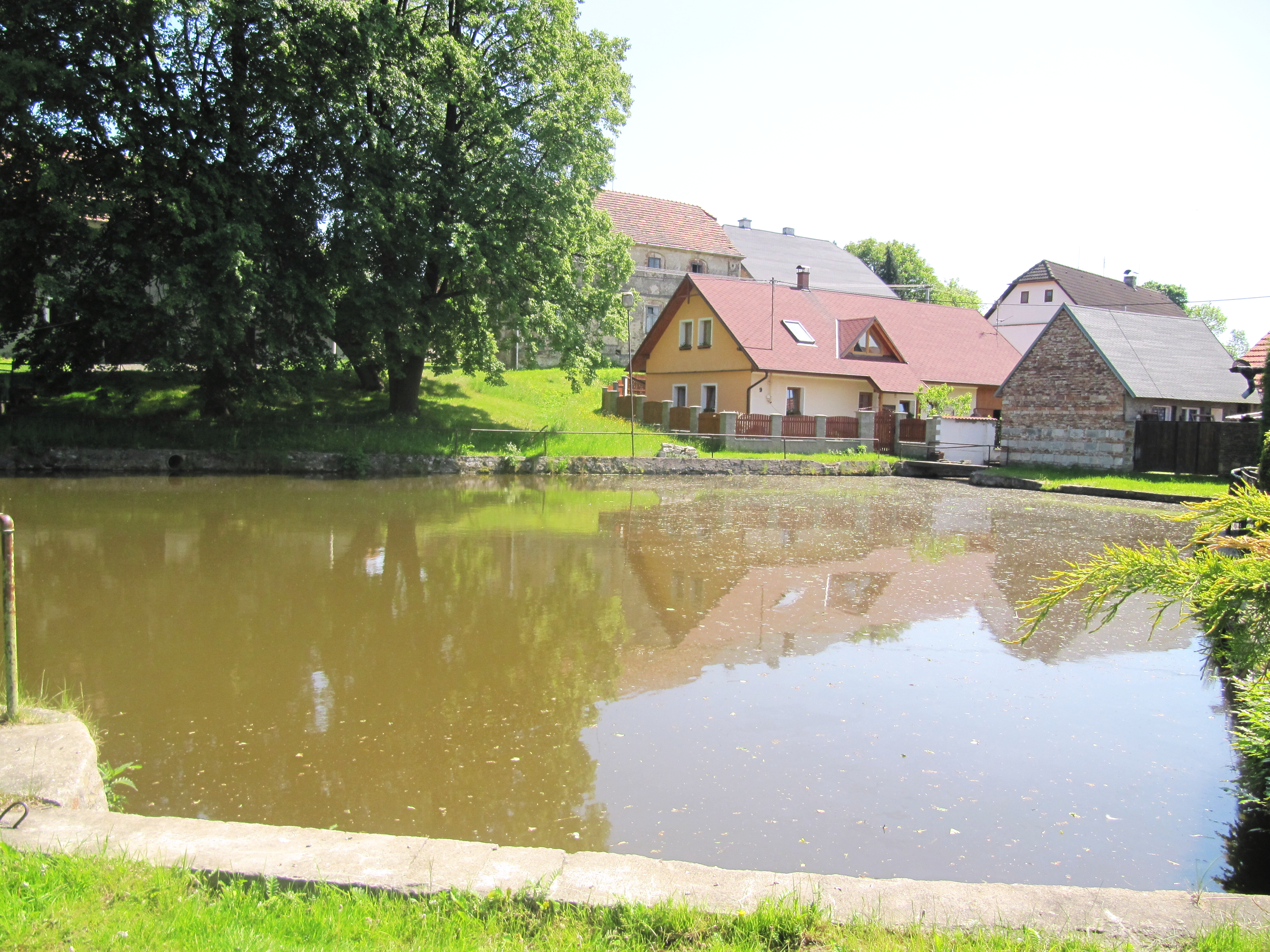
- A pond in the centre of Onomyšl

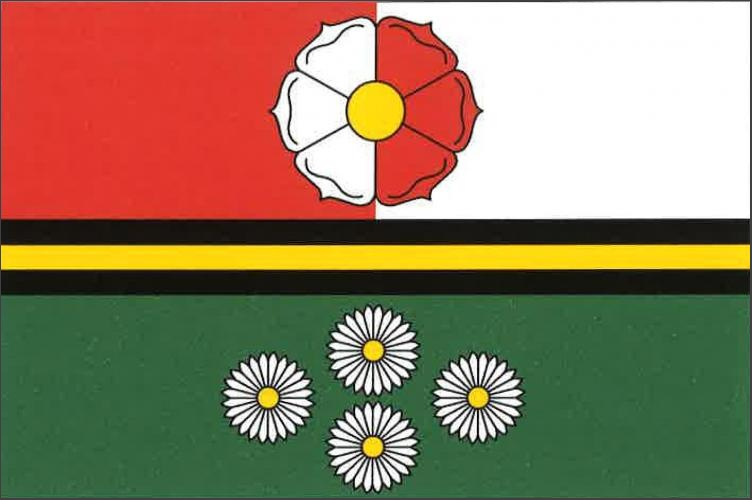
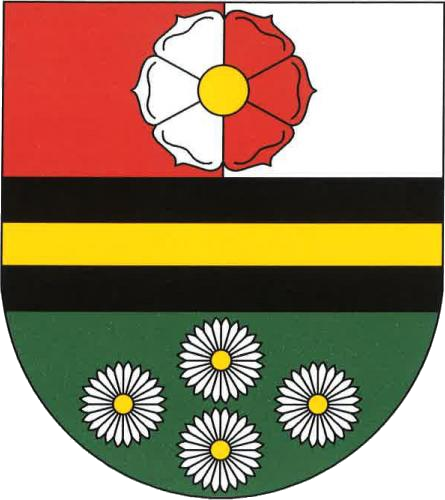
- Flag Coat of arms

- Location in the Czech Republic
- Coordinates: 49°53′57″N 15°7′28″E
- Country: Czech Republic
- Region: Central Bohemian
- District: Kutná Hora
- First mentioned: 1290

Area
  - Total: 12.89 km^{2} (4.98 sq mi)
- Elevation: 442 m (1,450 ft)

Population (2026-01-01)
  - Total: 347
  - Density: 26.9/km^{2} (69.7/sq mi)
- Time zone: UTC+1 (CET)
  - Summer (DST): UTC+2 (CEST)
- Postal code: 285 04
- Website: www.onomysl.cz

Onomyšl is a municipality and village in Kutná Hora District in the Central Bohemian Region of the Czech Republic. It has about 300 inhabitants.

== Administrative division ==
Onomyšl consists of five municipal parts (in brackets population according to the 2021 census):

- Onomyšl (174)
- Budy (0)
- Křečovice (56)
- Miletín (56)
- Rozkoš (24)

== Demographics ==
Historical population
Year	Pop.	±%
1869	866	—
1880	857	−1.0%
1890	868	+1.3%
1900	798	−8.1%
1910	807	+1.1%
1921	775	−4.0%
1930	694	−10.5%
1950	484	−30.3%
1961	422	−12.8%
1970	379	−10.2%
1980	342	−9.8%
1991	285	−16.7%
2001	262	−8.1%
2011	290	+10.7%
2021	310	+6.9%
Source: Censuses
