= Brambory =

- Municipality
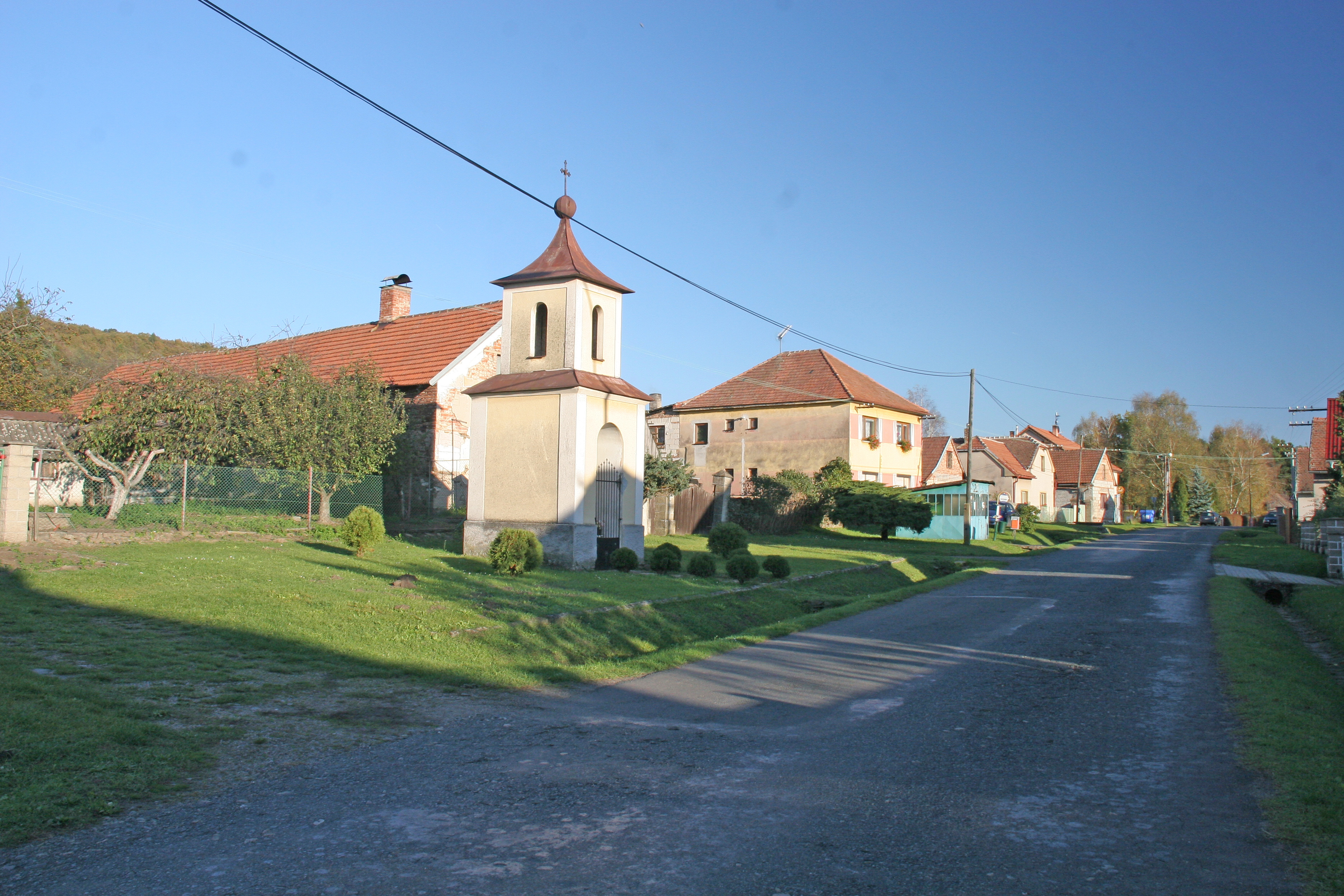
- Chapel in Brambory

- Location in the Czech Republic
- Coordinates: 49°58′42″N 15°28′13″E
- Country: Czech Republic
- Region: Central Bohemian
- District: Kutná Hora
- First mentioned: 1393

Area
  - Total: 1.25 km^{2} (0.48 sq mi)
- Elevation: 234 m (768 ft)

Population (2026-01-01)
  - Total: 114
  - Density: 91.2/km^{2} (236/sq mi)
- Time zone: UTC+1 (CET)
  - Summer (DST): UTC+2 (CEST)
- Postal code: 286 01
- Website: www.obec-brambory.cz

Brambory is a municipality and village in Kutná Hora District in the Central Bohemian Region of the Czech Republic. It has about 100 inhabitants.

== Demographics ==
Historical population
Year	Pop.	±%
1869	107	—
1880	113	+5.6%
1890	176	+55.8%
1900	172	−2.3%
1910	199	+15.7%
1921	126	−36.7%
1930	192	+52.4%
1950	92	−52.1%
1961	91	−1.1%
1970	167	+83.5%
1980	137	−18.0%
1991	108	−21.2%
2001	104	−3.7%
2011	111	+6.7%
2021	125	+12.6%
Source: Censuses
