= Třebonín =

- Municipality
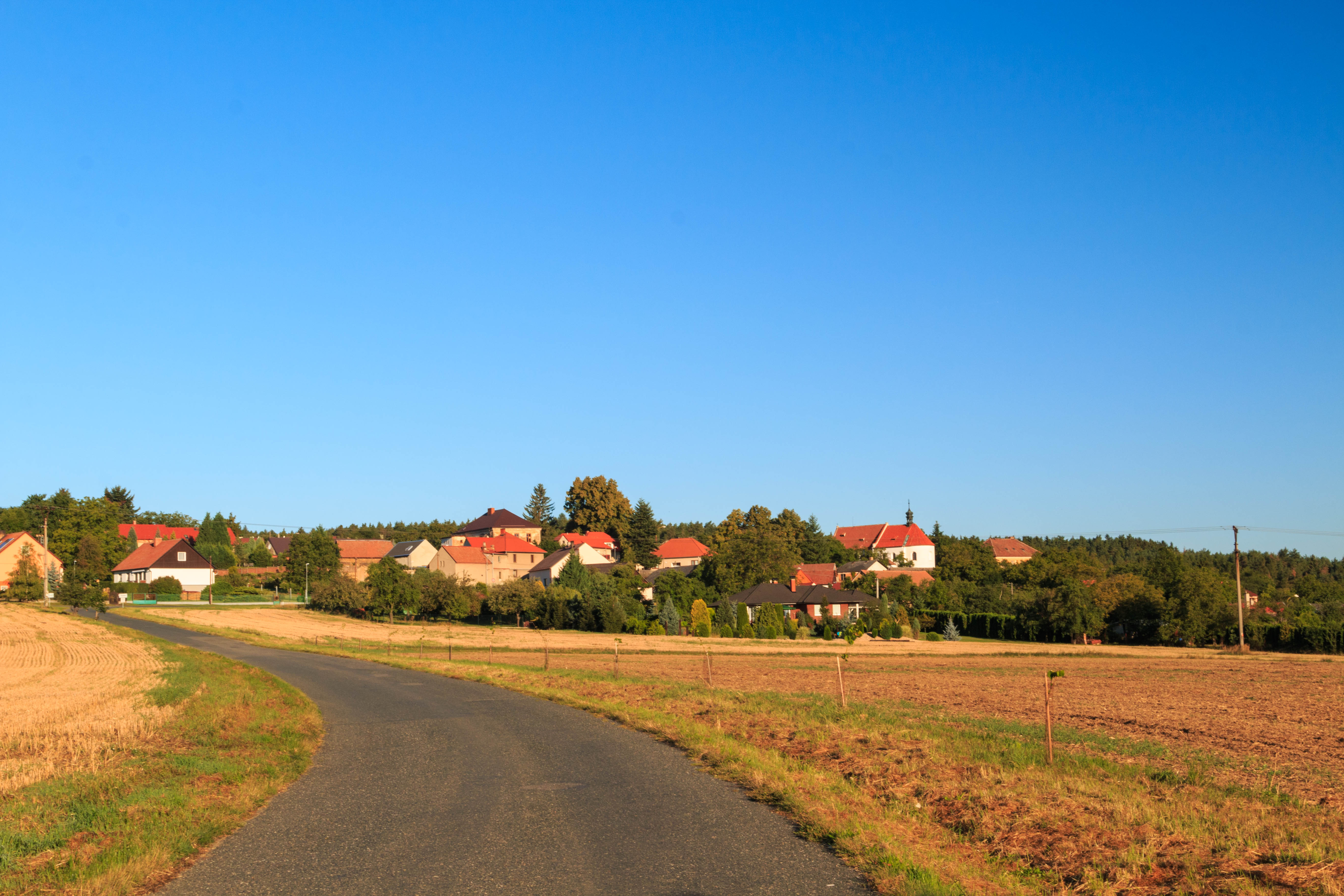
- View from the southeast

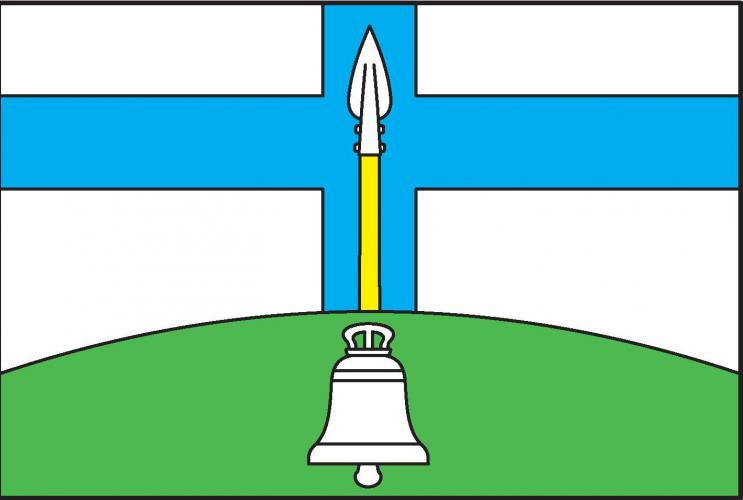
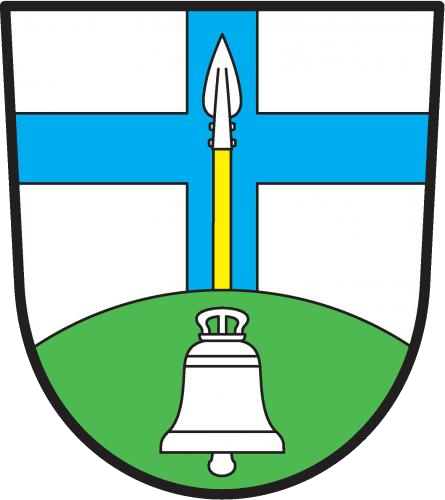
- Flag Coat of arms

- Location in the Czech Republic
- Coordinates: 49°52′11″N 15°18′47″E
- Country: Czech Republic
- Region: Central Bohemian
- District: Kutná Hora
- First mentioned: 1194

Area
  - Total: 3.42 km^{2} (1.32 sq mi)
- Elevation: 340 m (1,120 ft)

Population (2026-01-01)
  - Total: 130
  - Density: 38/km^{2} (98/sq mi)
- Time zone: UTC+1 (CET)
  - Summer (DST): UTC+2 (CEST)
- Postal code: 285 44
- Website: www.trebonin.cz

Třebonín is a municipality and village in Kutná Hora District in the Central Bohemian Region of the Czech Republic. It has about 100 inhabitants.

== Demographics ==
Historical population
Year	Pop.	±%
1869	384	—
1880	403	+4.9%
1890	376	−6.7%
1900	376	+0.0%
1910	362	−3.7%
1921	355	−1.9%
1930	279	−21.4%
1950	231	−17.2%
1961	195	−15.6%
1970	164	−15.9%
1980	169	+3.0%
1991	122	−27.8%
2001	125	+2.5%
2011	133	+6.4%
2021	139	+4.5%
Source: Censuses
