= Petrovice II =

- Municipality
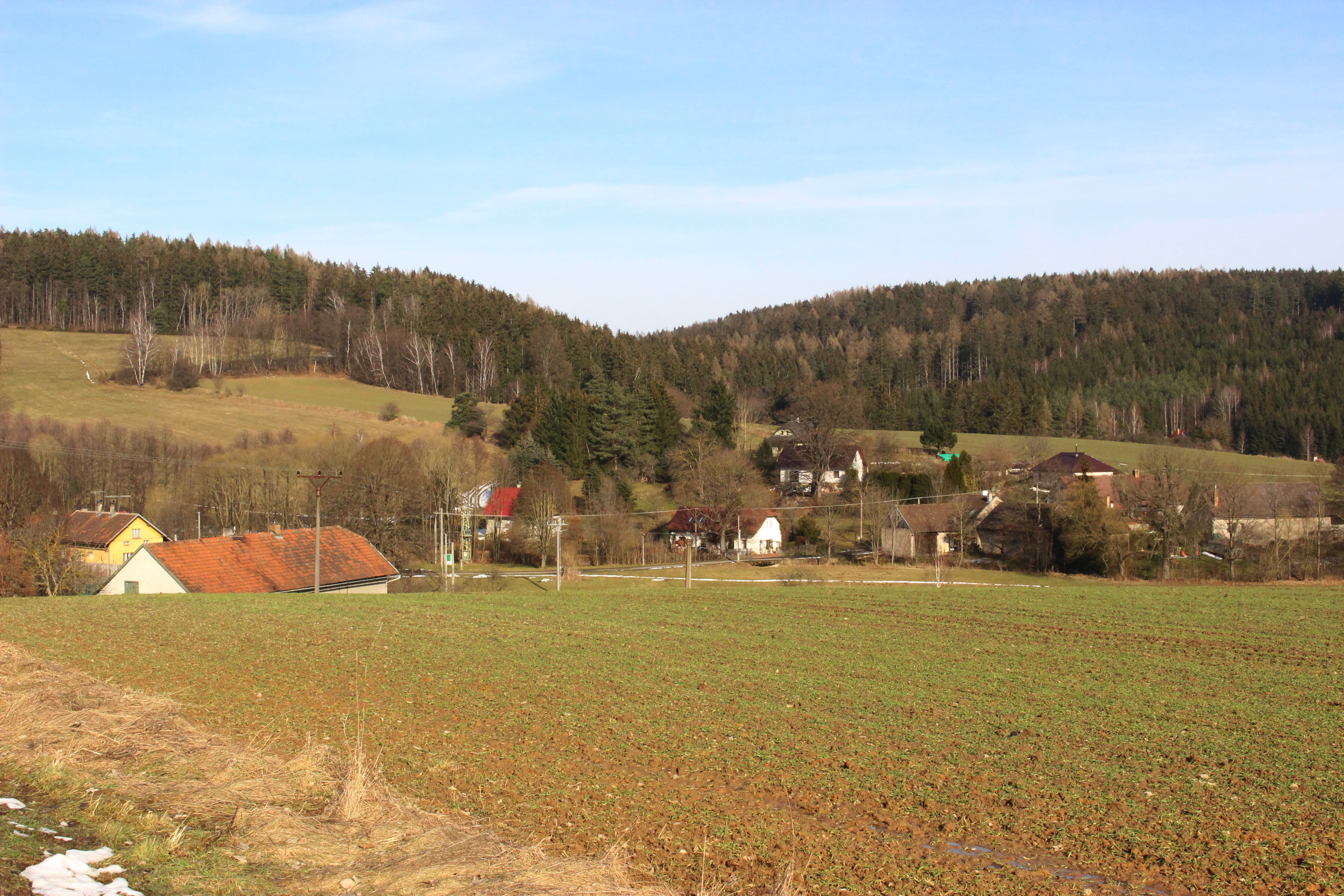
- Tlučeň, a part of Petrovice II

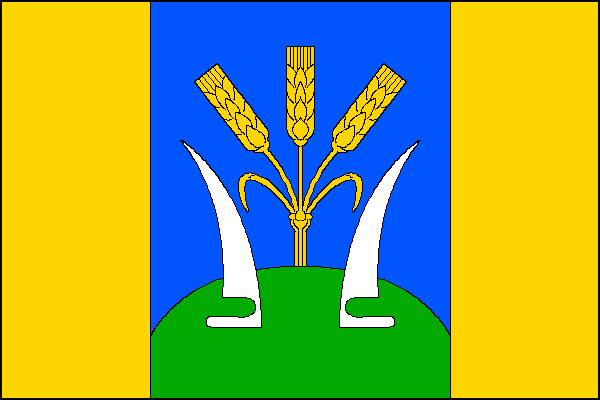
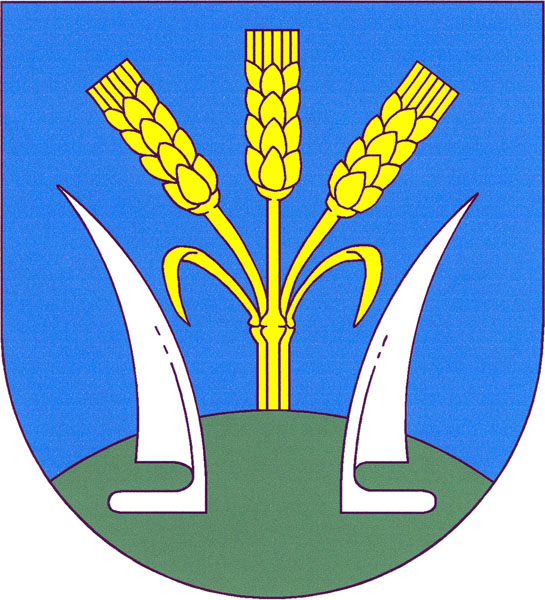
- Flag Coat of arms

- Location in the Czech Republic
- Coordinates: 49°48′36″N 15°3′48″E
- Country: Czech Republic
- Region: Central Bohemian
- District: Kutná Hora
- First mentioned: 1291

Area
  - Total: 11.61 km^{2} (4.48 sq mi)
- Elevation: 425 m (1,394 ft)

Population (2026-01-01)
  - Total: 155
  - Density: 13.4/km^{2} (34.6/sq mi)
- Time zone: UTC+1 (CET)
  - Summer (DST): UTC+2 (CEST)
- Postal code: 285 04, 285 22
- Website: www.petrovice2.cz

Petrovice II is a municipality and village in Kutná Hora District in the Central Bohemian Region of the Czech Republic. It has about 200 inhabitants.

The Roman numeral in the name serves to distinguish it from the nearby municipality of the same name, Petrovice I.

== Administrative division ==
Petrovice II consists of seven municipal parts (in brackets population according to the 2021 census):

- Petrovice II (34)
- Boštice (18)
- Losiny (24)
- Nové Nespeřice (20)
- Stará Huť (23)
- Staré Nespeřice (39)
- Tlučeň (7)

== Demographics ==
Historical population
Year	Pop.	±%
1869	1,074	—
1880	1,123	+4.6%
1890	1,052	−6.3%
1900	1,018	−3.2%
1910	911	−10.5%
1921	865	−5.0%
1930	699	−19.2%
1950	477	−31.8%
1961	453	−5.0%
1970	349	−23.0%
1980	242	−30.7%
1991	158	−34.7%
2001	107	−32.3%
2011	106	−0.9%
2021	165	+55.7%
Source: Censuses
