= Okřesaneč =

- Municipality
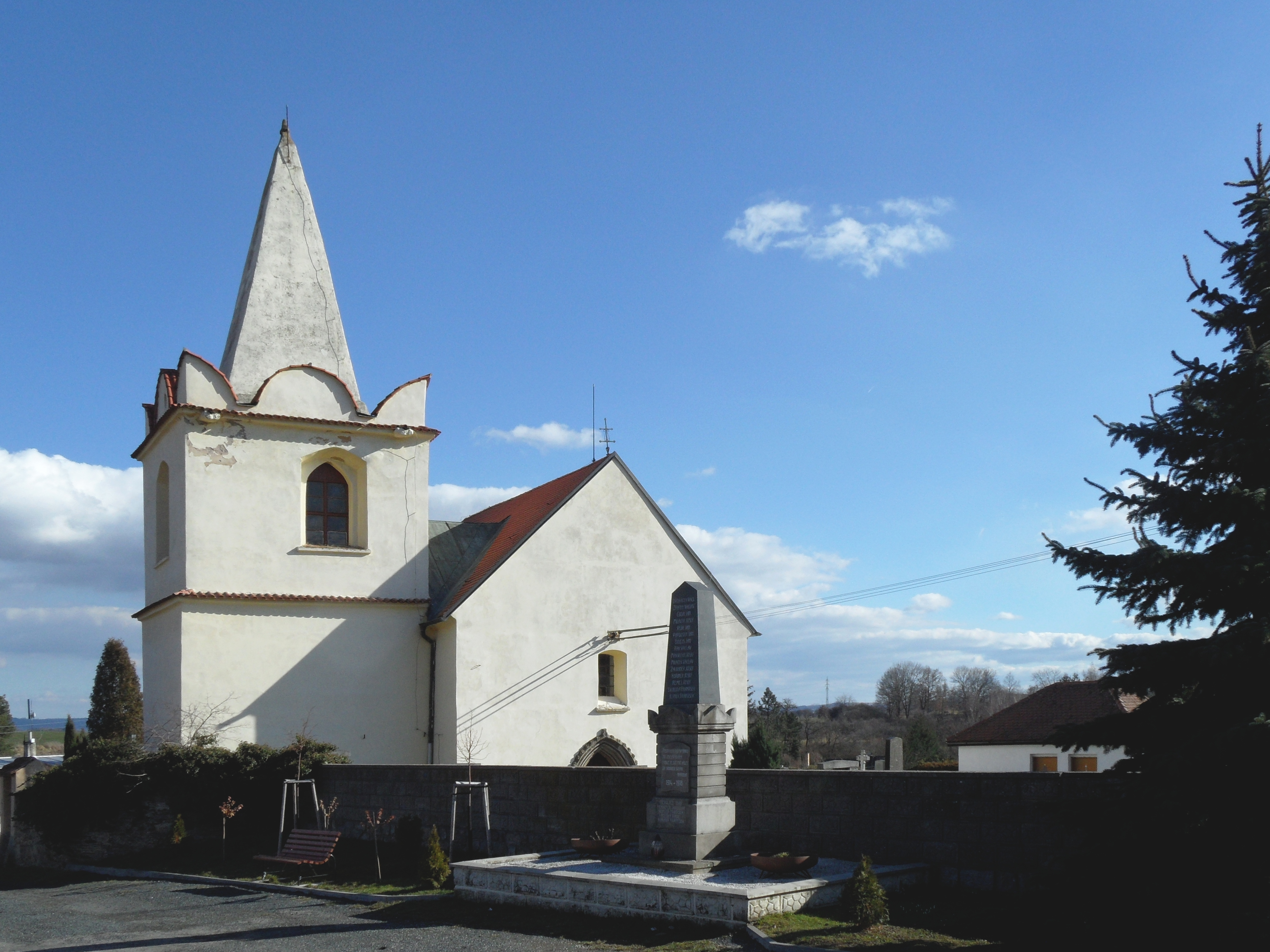
- Church of Saint Bartholomew

- Location in the Czech Republic
- Coordinates: 49°51′9″N 15°28′33″E
- Country: Czech Republic
- Region: Central Bohemian
- District: Kutná Hora
- First mentioned: 1352

Area
  - Total: 2.39 km^{2} (0.92 sq mi)
- Elevation: 311 m (1,020 ft)

Population (2026-01-01)
  - Total: 204
  - Density: 85.4/km^{2} (221/sq mi)
- Time zone: UTC+1 (CET)
  - Summer (DST): UTC+2 (CEST)
- Postal code: 286 01
- Website: okresanec.cz

Okřesaneč is a municipality and village in Kutná Hora District in the Central Bohemian Region of the Czech Republic. It has about 200 inhabitants.

== Demographics ==
Historical population
Year	Pop.	±%
1869	387	—
1880	409	+5.7%
1890	399	−2.4%
1900	391	−2.0%
1910	409	+4.6%
1921	424	+3.7%
1930	386	−9.0%
1950	346	−10.4%
1961	392	+13.3%
1970	346	−11.7%
1980	258	−25.4%
1991	207	−19.8%
2001	191	−7.7%
2011	189	−1.0%
2021	192	+1.6%
Source: Censuses
