= Košice (Kutná Hora District) =

- Municipality
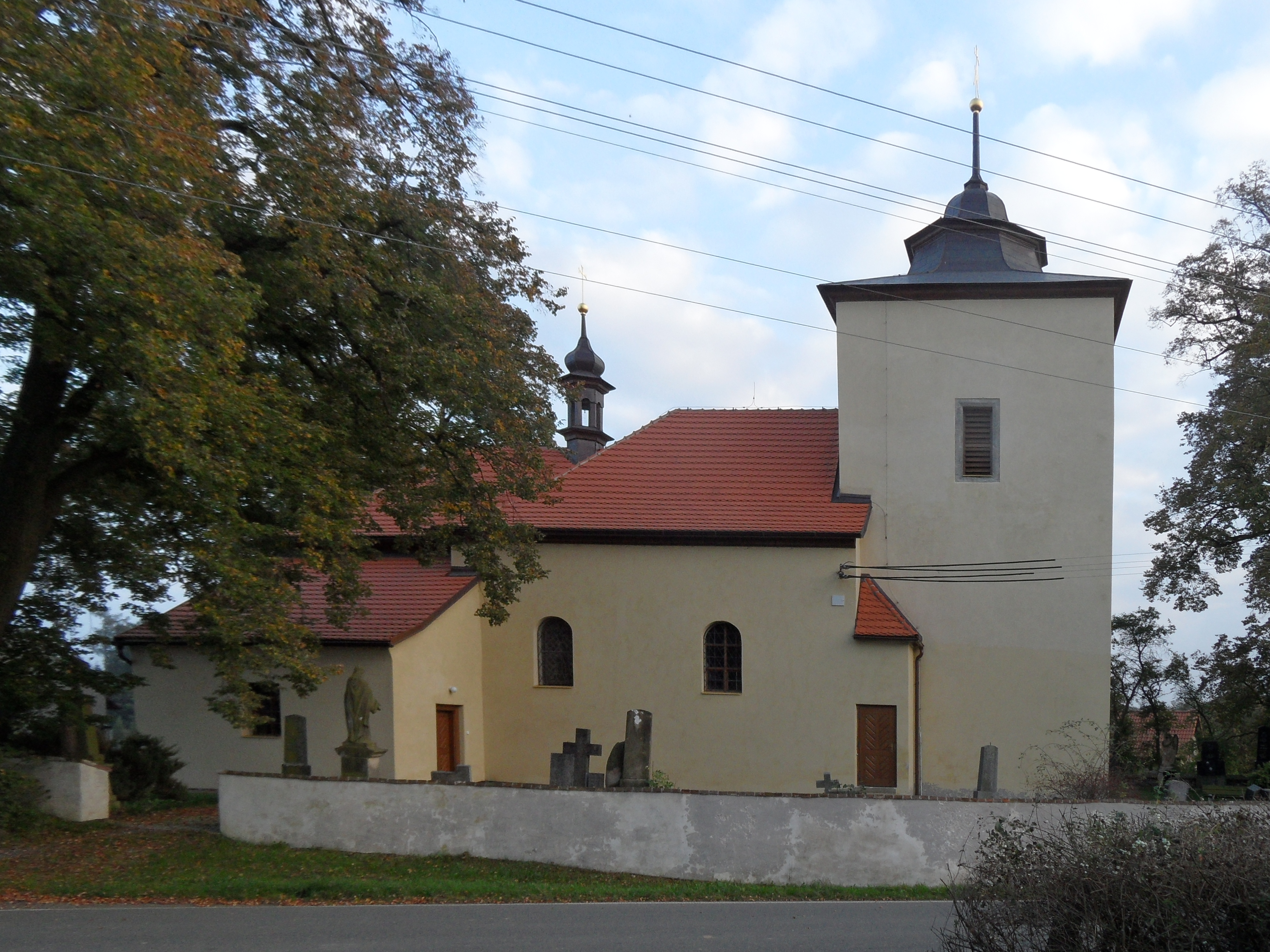
- Church of the Nativity of the Virgin Mary

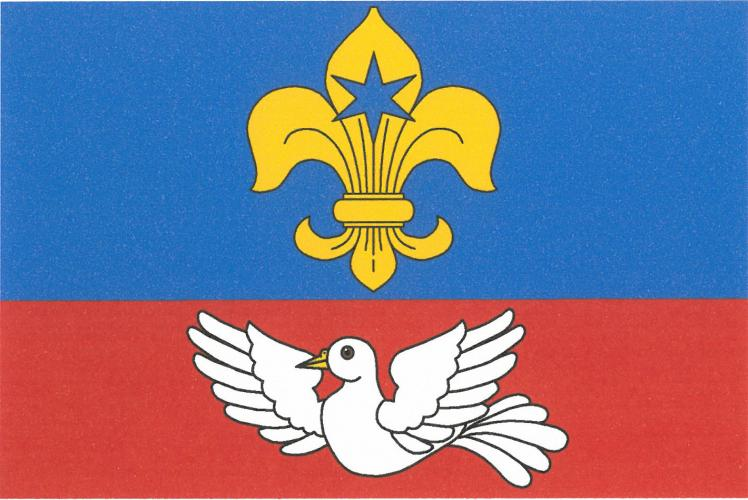
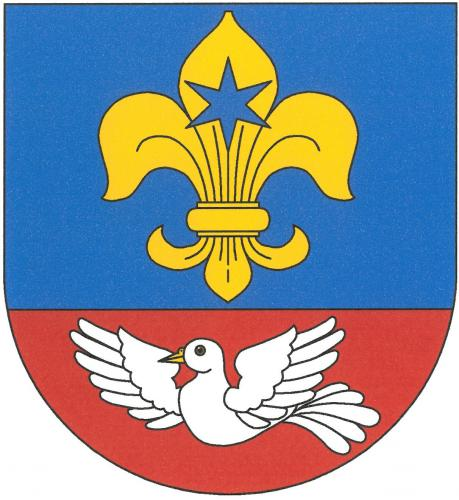
- Flag Coat of arms

- Location in the Czech Republic
- Coordinates: 49°53′45″N 15°9′3″E
- Country: Czech Republic
- Region: Central Bohemian
- District: Kutná Hora
- First mentioned: 1310

Area
  - Total: 2.09 km^{2} (0.81 sq mi)
- Elevation: 438 m (1,437 ft)

Population (2026-01-01)
  - Total: 58
  - Density: 28/km^{2} (72/sq mi)
- Time zone: UTC+1 (CET)
  - Summer (DST): UTC+2 (CEST)
- Postal code: 285 04
- Website: www.kosice-kh.cz

Košice is a municipality and village in Kutná Hora District in the Central Bohemian Region of the Czech Republic. It has about 60 inhabitants.

== History ==
The first written mention of Košice is from 1310.

== Demographics ==
Historical population
Year	Pop.	±%
1869	210	—
1880	282	+34.3%
1890	253	−10.3%
1900	150	−40.7%
1910	149	−0.7%
1921	280	+87.9%
1930	146	−47.9%
1950	190	+30.1%
1961	111	−41.6%
1970	100	−9.9%
1980	79	−21.0%
1991	57	−27.8%
2001	43	−24.6%
2011	46	+7.0%
2021	61	+32.6%
Source: Censuses
