= Ovčáry =

Ovčáry may refer to places in the Czech Republic:

- Ovčáry (Kolín District), a municipality and village in the Central Bohemian Region
- Ovčáry (Mělník District), a municipality and village in the Central Bohemian Region
- Ovčáry, a village and part of Nové Dvory (Kutná Hora District) in the Central Bohemian Region
