= Tatce =

- Municipality
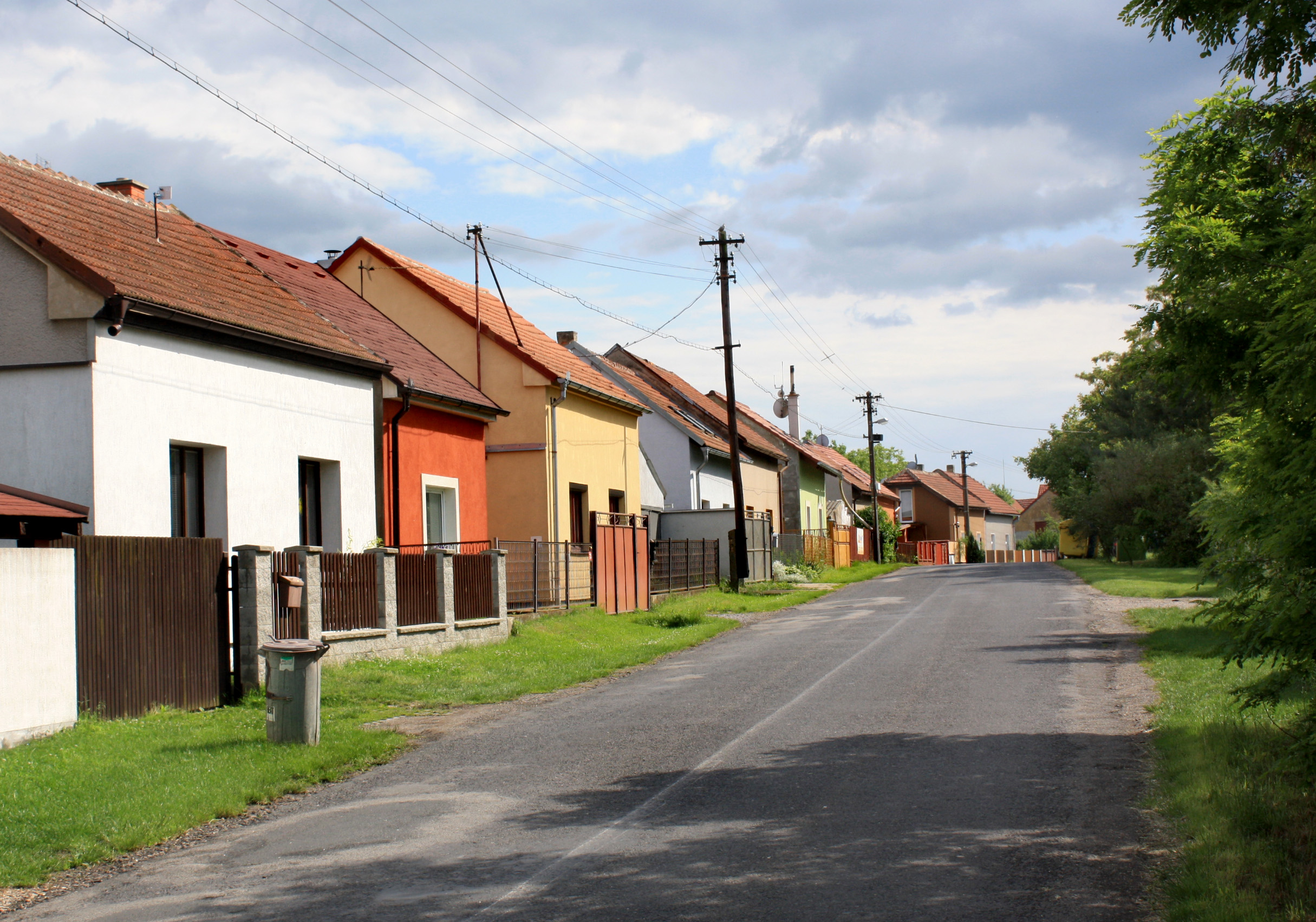
- Northern part of Tatce

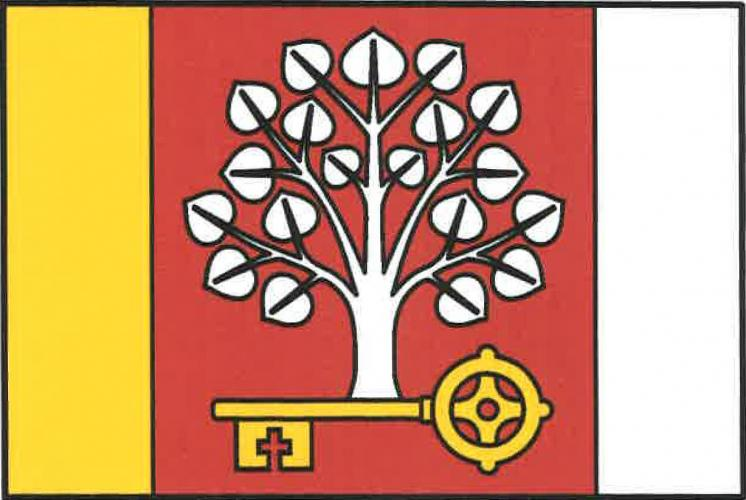
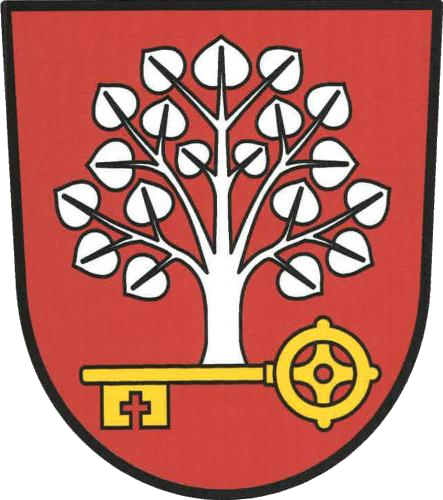
- Flag Coat of arms

- Location in the Czech Republic
- Coordinates: 50°5′28″N 14°58′38″E
- Country: Czech Republic
- Region: Central Bohemian
- District: Kolín
- First mentioned: 1292

Area
  - Total: 4.43 km^{2} (1.71 sq mi)
- Elevation: 208 m (682 ft)

Population (2026-01-01)
  - Total: 679
  - Density: 153/km^{2} (397/sq mi)
- Time zone: UTC+1 (CET)
  - Summer (DST): UTC+2 (CEST)
- Postal code: 289 11
- Website: www.tatce.cz

Tatce is a municipality and village in Kolín District in the Central Bohemian Region of the Czech Republic. It has about 700 inhabitants.

== Etymology ==
In Old Czech, the word tat meant 'thief' and tatec was a diminutive of tat. So the name Tatce meant "the village of little thieves".

== Geography ==
Tatce is located about 17 kilometres (11 mi) northwest of Kolín and 32 km (20 mi) east of Prague. It lies in a flat agricultural landscape in the Central Elbe Table.

== History ==
The first written mention of Tatce is from 1292.

== Demographics ==
Historical population

Year	Pop.	±%
1869	702	—
1880	855	+21.8%
1890	787	−8.0%
1900	680	−13.6%
1910	790	+16.2%

Year	Pop.	±%
1921	772	−2.3%
1930	789	+2.2%
1950	597	−24.3%
1961	619	+3.7%
1970	583	−5.8%

Year	Pop.	±%
1980	585	+0.3%
1991	572	−2.2%
2001	552	−3.5%
2011	588	+6.5%
2021	646	+9.9%

Source: Censuses

== Transport ==
Tatce is located on the railway line Prague–Kolín.

== Sights ==
There are no protected cultural monuments in the municipality. A landmark is the Chapel of the Virgin Mary, which dates from 1843.
