= Grunta =

- Municipality
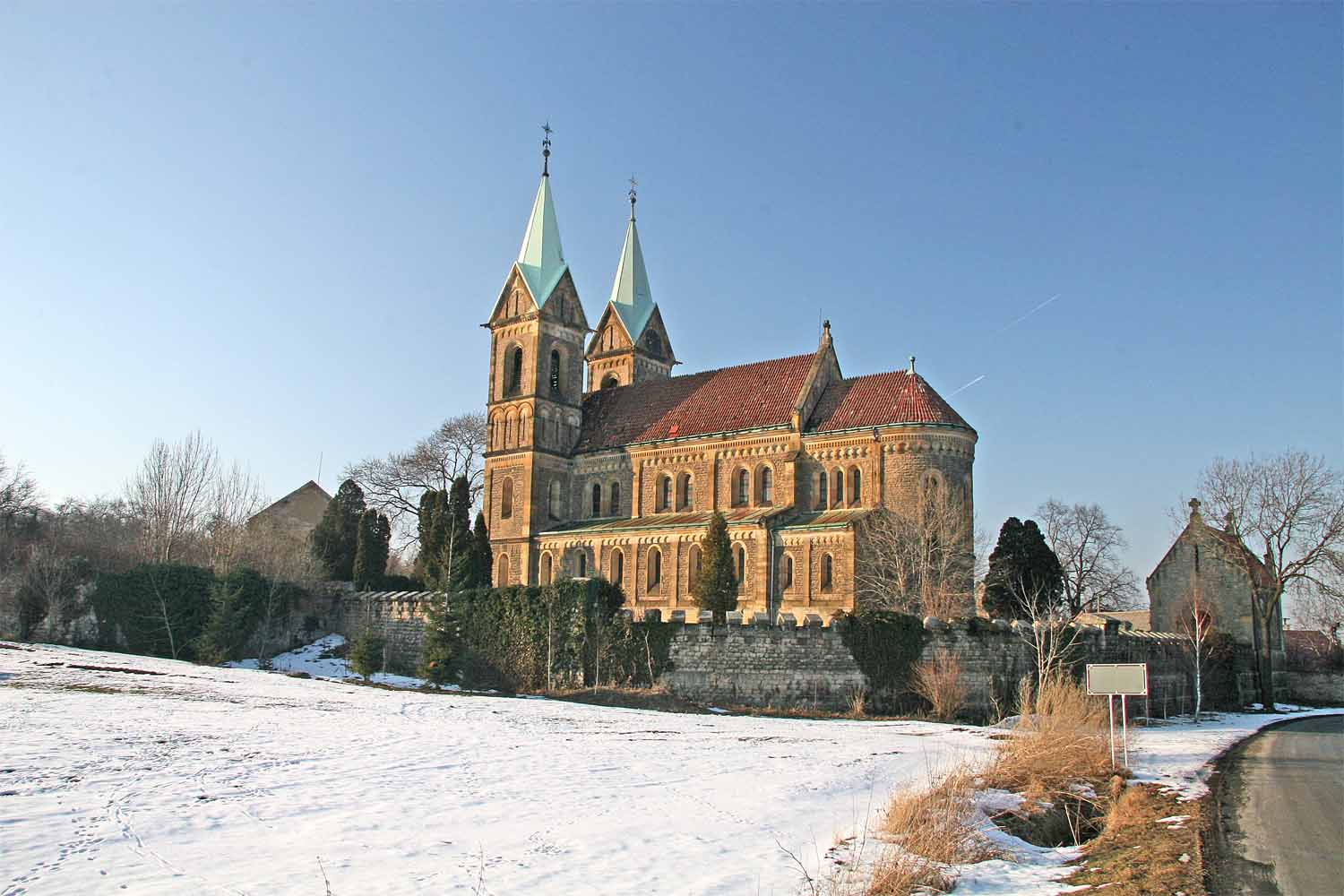
- Church of the Assumption of the Virgin Mary

- Location in the Czech Republic
- Coordinates: 49°58′27″N 15°15′18″E
- Country: Czech Republic
- Region: Central Bohemian
- District: Kolín
- First mentioned: 1305

Area
  - Total: 0.80 km^{2} (0.31 sq mi)
- Elevation: 212 m (696 ft)

Population (2026-01-01)
  - Total: 97
  - Density: 120/km^{2} (310/sq mi)
- Time zone: UTC+1 (CET)
  - Summer (DST): UTC+2 (CEST)
- Postal code: 280 02
- Website: www.grunta.cz

Grunta is a municipality and village in Kolín District in the Central Bohemian Region of the Czech Republic. It has about 100 inhabitants.

== Etymology ==
The name was derived from the German word Grund that used to mean 'valley'. The name appears in the oldest sources in Latin as vallis beatae virginis, i.e. 'valley of the Virgin Mary'.

== Geography ==
Grunta is located about 2 kilometres (1 mi) northwest of Kutná Hora, 7 km (4 mi) southeast of Kolín and 52 km (32 mi) east of Prague. It lies mostly in the Upper Sázava Hills, but the municipal territory also extends into the Central Elbe Table in the north. The highest point is at 315 m (1,033 ft) above sea level.

== History ==
The village was probably founded in the mid-13th century by the German miners, when silver was discovered in the area. The first written mention of Grunta is from 1305.

== Demographics ==
Historical population

Year	Pop.	±%
1869	145	—
1880	147	+1.4%
1890	152	+3.4%
1900	141	−7.2%
1910	140	−0.7%

Year	Pop.	±%
1921	128	−8.6%
1930	115	−10.2%
1950	135	+17.4%
1961	125	−7.4%
1970	121	−3.2%

Year	Pop.	±%
1980	111	−8.3%
1991	86	−22.5%
2001	86	+0.0%
2011	97	+12.8%
2021	96	−1.0%

Source: Censuses

== Transport ==
There are no railways or major roads passing through the municipality.

== Sights ==
The main landmark of Grunta is the Church of the Assumption of the Virgin Mary. It was built in the neo-Romanesque and Art Nouveau styles in 1905–1906.
