= Černíky =

- Municipality
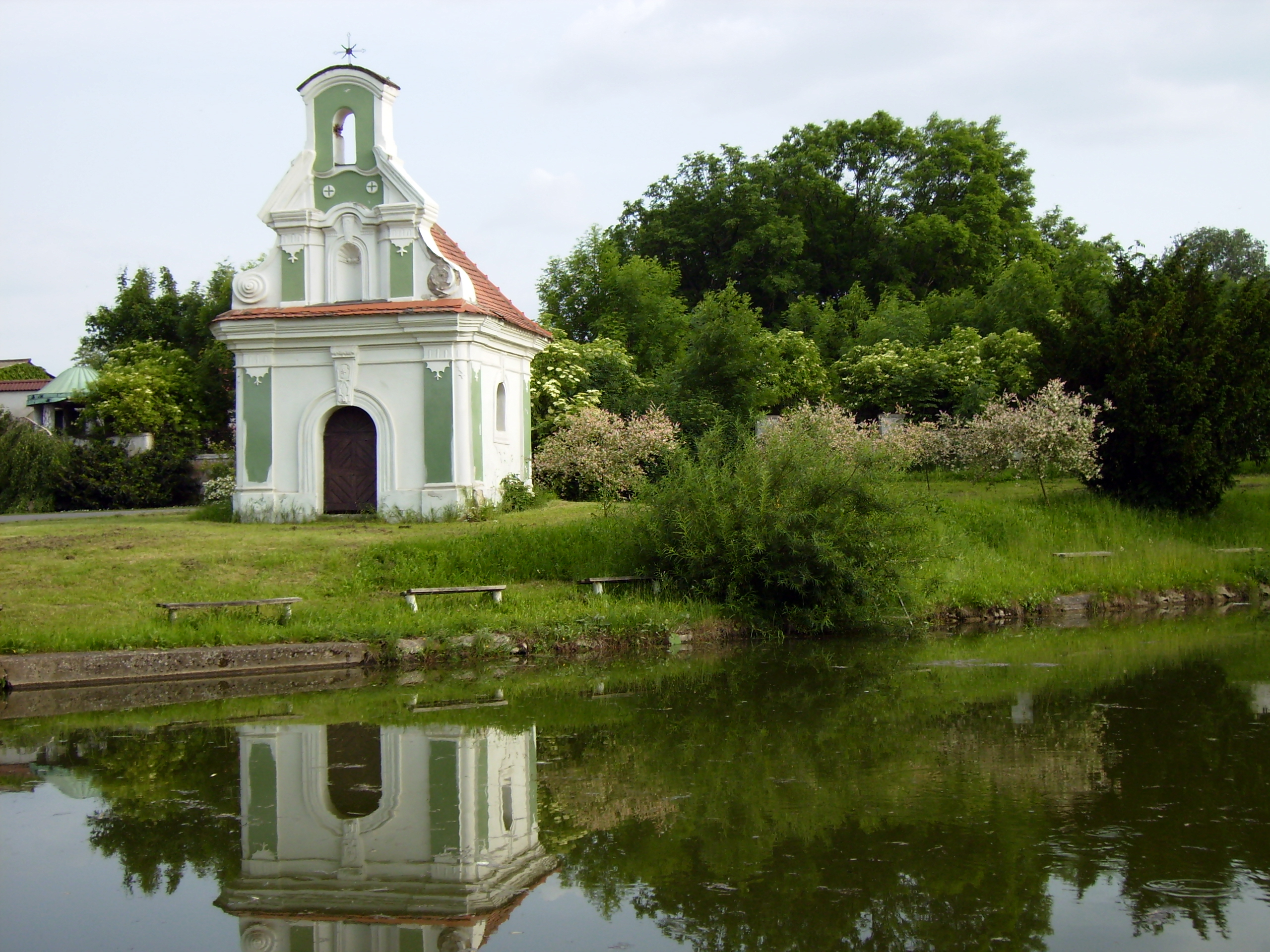
- Chapel of Saint Wenceslaus

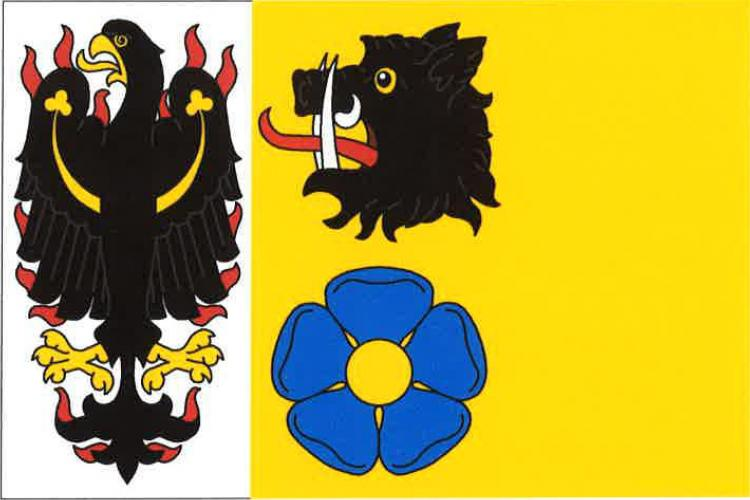
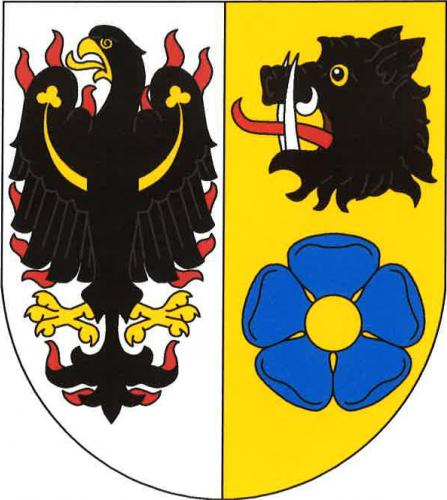
- Flag Coat of arms

- Location in the Czech Republic
- Coordinates: 50°6′7″N 14°49′12″E
- Country: Czech Republic
- Region: Central Bohemian
- District: Kolín
- First mentioned: 1293

Area
  - Total: 3.88 km^{2} (1.50 sq mi)
- Elevation: 237 m (778 ft)

Population (2026-01-01)
  - Total: 171
  - Density: 44.1/km^{2} (114/sq mi)
- Time zone: UTC+1 (CET)
  - Summer (DST): UTC+2 (CEST)
- Postal code: 289 15
- Website: www.obec-cerniky.cz

Černíky is a municipality and village in Kolín District in the Central Bohemian Region of the Czech Republic. It has about 200 inhabitants.

== Etymology ==
The initial name of the village was Črmníky, meaning "the village of Črmníks (Črmník family)". By distorting and simplifying the pronunciation, the name Černíky gradually arose. The name Černíky was first documented in 1654.

== Geography ==
Černíky is located about 28 kilometres (17 mi) west of Kolín and 20 km (12 mi) east of Prague. It lies in a flat agricultural landscape in the Central Elbe Table. In the eastern tip of the municipal territory is a fishpond, supplied by the stream Kounický potok.

== History ==
The first written mention of Černíky is from 1293.

From 1 January 2021, Černíky is no longer a part of Nymburk District and belongs to Kolín District.

== Demographics ==
Historical population

Year	Pop.	±%
1869	250	—
1880	320	+28.0%
1890	325	+1.6%
1900	270	−16.9%
1910	276	+2.2%

Year	Pop.	±%
1921	284	+2.9%
1930	306	+7.7%
1950	189	−38.2%
1961	174	−7.9%
1970	162	−6.9%

Year	Pop.	±%
1980	150	−7.4%
1991	125	−16.7%
2001	96	−23.2%
2011	116	+20.8%
2021	166	+43.1%

Source: Censuses

== Transport ==
There are no railways or major roads passing through the municipality.

== Sights ==
The main landmark of Černíky is the Chapel of Saint Wenceslaus. It was built in the Baroque style in 1760.
