= OTK =

OTK may refer to:

Organisations

- Austrian Tourist Club (German: Österreichische Touristenklub or ÖTK)
- Obrona Terytorium Kraju (ISO 639:otk), territorial defense forces of Poland
- Obchodní tiskárny Kolín, Czech paper and card manufacturers
- One True King, a gaming organization based in Austin, Texas

Other meanings

- Technical Control Department (Russian: Отдел технического контроля or ОТК)
- Old Turkic (language code)
- One time key, a method related to encryption
- Otakuthon, Montreal's anime convention
- Ottakring, the 16th municipal district of Vienna
- Over-the-knee boots ("OTK boots")
