= Barchovice =

- Municipality
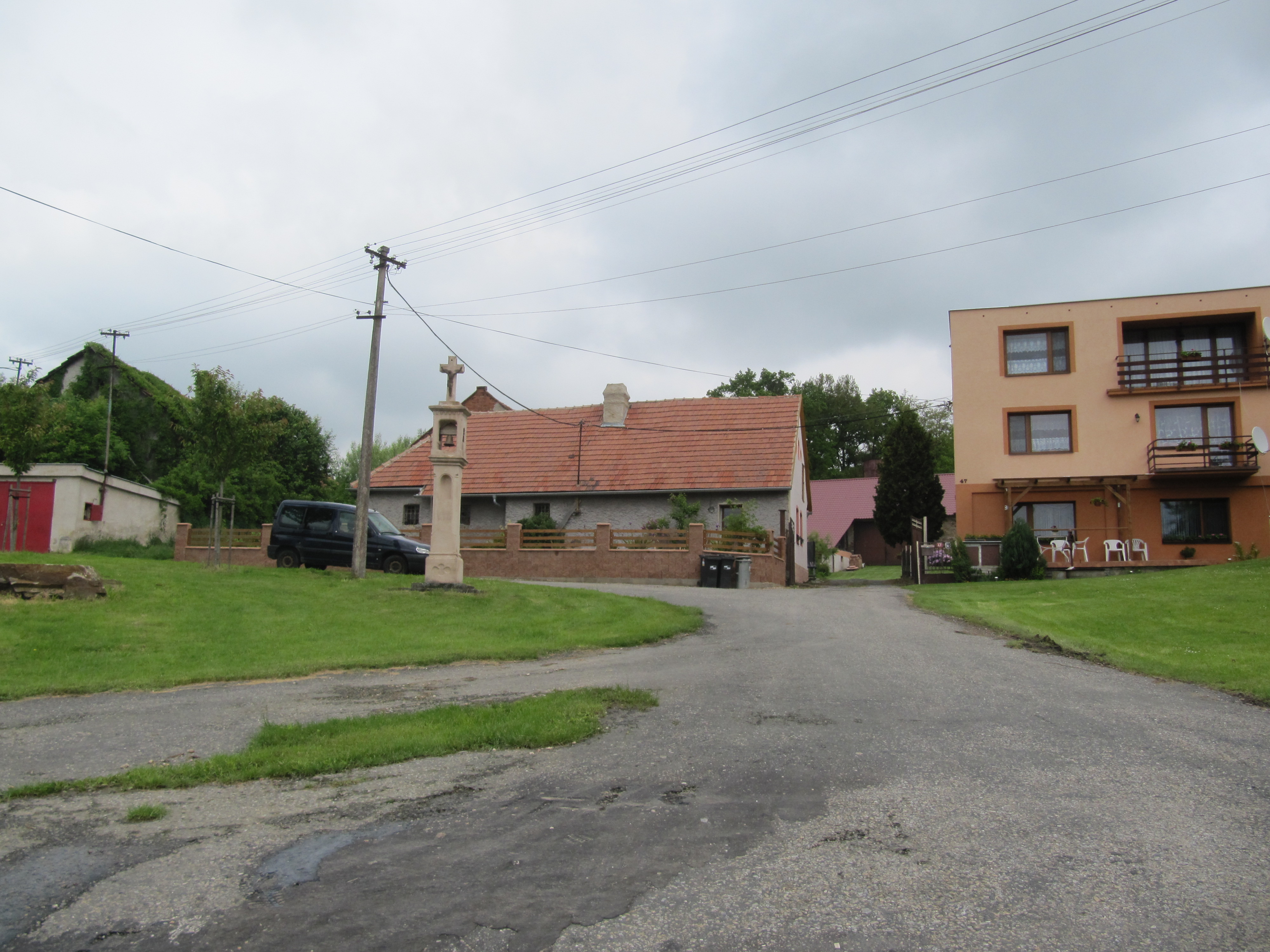
- Centre of Barchovice

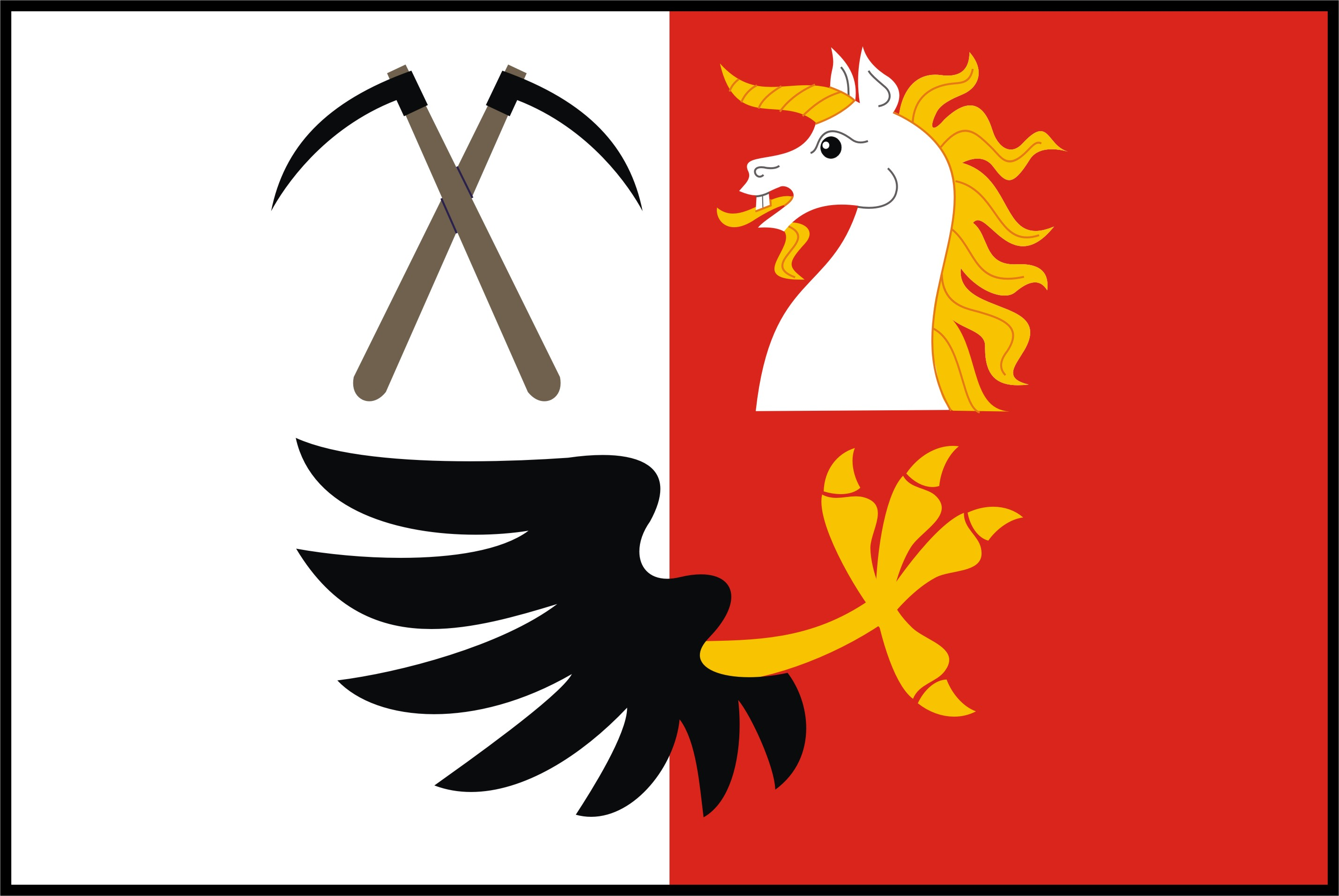
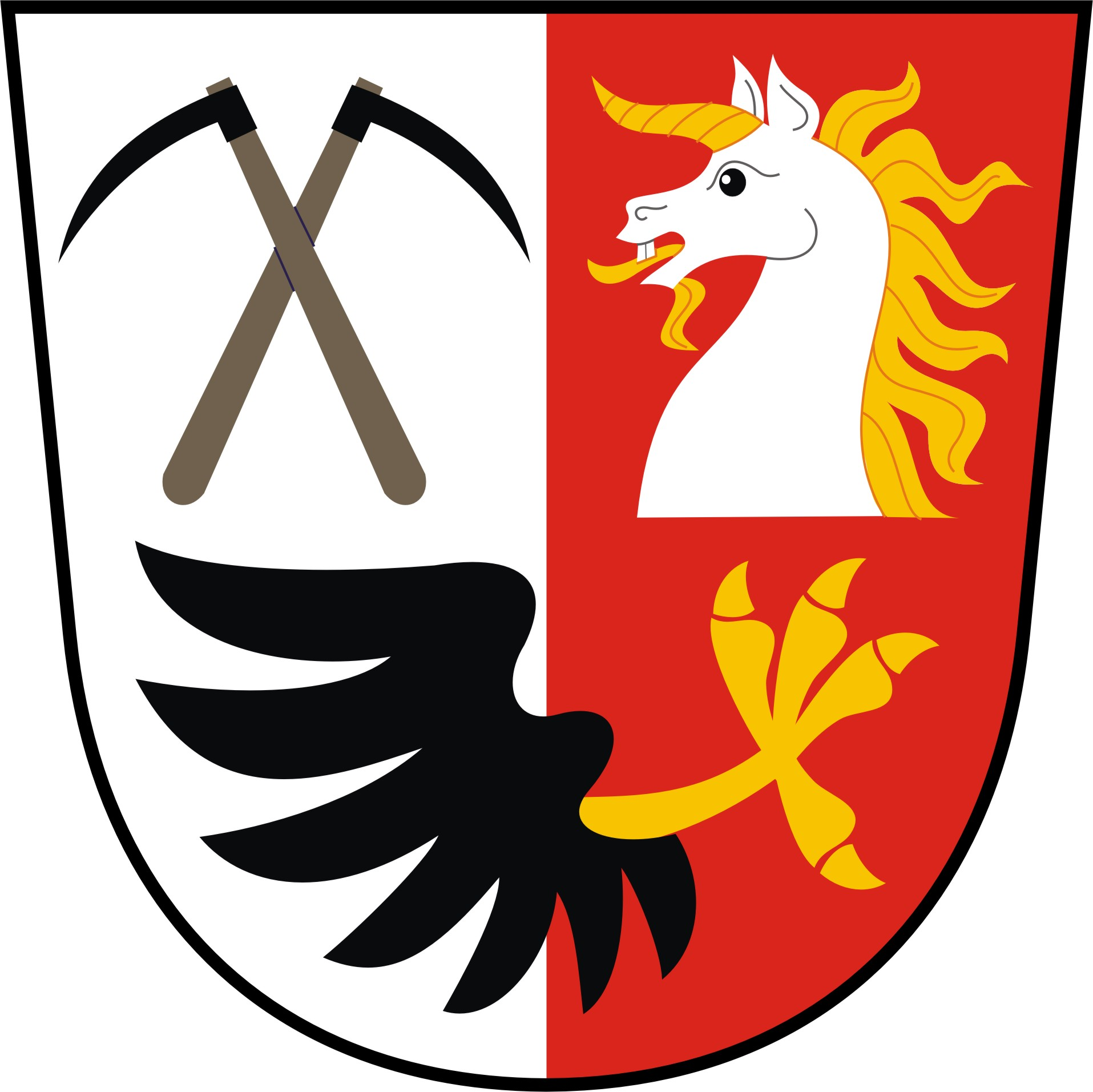
- Flag Coat of arms

- Location in the Czech Republic
- Coordinates: 49°56′40″N 14°58′9″E
- Country: Czech Republic
- Region: Central Bohemian
- District: Kolín
- First mentioned: 1340

Area
  - Total: 17.74 km^{2} (6.85 sq mi)
- Elevation: 329 m (1,079 ft)

Population (2026-01-01)
  - Total: 256
  - Density: 14.4/km^{2} (37.4/sq mi)
- Time zone: UTC+1 (CET)
  - Summer (DST): UTC+2 (CEST)
- Postal code: 281 63
- Website: www.barchovice.cz

Barchovice is a municipality and village in Kolín District in the Central Bohemian Region of the Czech Republic. It has about 300 inhabitants.

== Administrative division ==
Barchovice consists of three municipal parts (in brackets population according to the 2021 census):

- Barchovice (125)
- Hryzely (51)
- Radlice (77)

== Etymology ==
The name is derived from the personal name Barch, meaning "the village of Barch's people".

== Geography ==
Barchovice is located about 18 kilometres (11 mi) southwest of Kolín and 33 km (21 mi) southeast of Prague. The municipal territory lies in three geomorphological regions: the eastern part lies in the Upper Sázava Hills, the central part lies in a tip of the Central Elbe Table, and the western part extends into the Benešov Uplands. The highest point is the hill Kamenný vrch at 456 m (1,496 ft) above sea level. The eastern municipal border is formed by the Výrovka River.

== History ==
The first written mention of Barchovice is from 1340. The area was divided into two parts, which belonged to different estates (Zásmuky and Kostelec estates) with different owners. The larger part of Barchovice belonged to the Zásmuky estate and its most notable owners were the Sternberg family, who held it from 1653 to 1848.

== Demographics ==
Historical population

Year	Pop.	±%
1869	807	—
1880	839	+4.0%
1890	821	−2.1%
1900	844	+2.8%
1910	840	−0.5%

Year	Pop.	±%
1921	824	−1.9%
1930	740	−10.2%
1950	479	−35.3%
1961	398	−16.9%
1970	317	−20.4%

Year	Pop.	±%
1980	260	−18.0%
1991	202	−22.3%
2001	192	−5.0%
2011	190	−1.0%
2021	253	+33.2%

Source: Censuses

== Transport ==
There are no railways or major roads passing through the municipality.

== Sights ==
The only protected cultural monuments in the locality where the early medieval gord Šance stood. Today it is an archaeological site. The remains of the fortification are still visible.

Among the landmarks are the three pillared stone belfries, one in each village.
