= Bobnice =

- Municipality
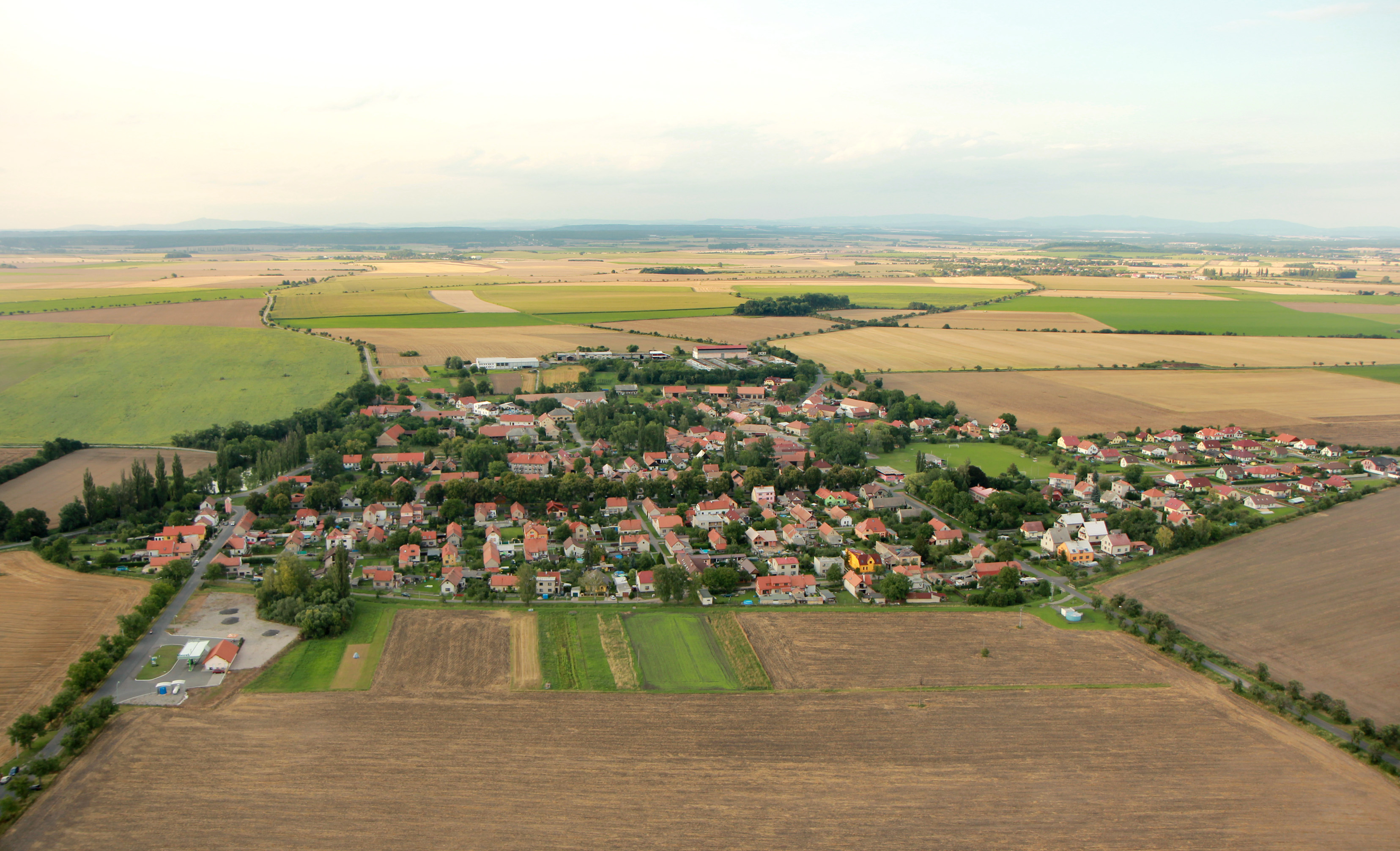
- Aerial view from the south

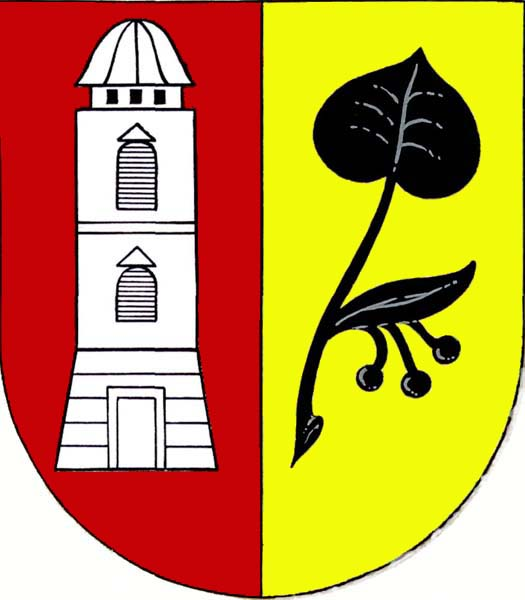
- Flag Coat of arms

- Location in the Czech Republic
- Coordinates: 50°13′11″N 15°3′13″E
- Country: Czech Republic
- Region: Central Bohemian
- District: Nymburk
- First mentioned: 1363

Area
  - Total: 9.95 km^{2} (3.84 sq mi)
- Elevation: 192 m (630 ft)

Population (2026-01-01)
  - Total: 882
  - Density: 88.6/km^{2} (230/sq mi)
- Time zone: UTC+1 (CET)
  - Summer (DST): UTC+2 (CEST)
- Postal code: 289 31
- Website: www.bobnice.cz

Bobnice is a municipality and village in Nymburk District in the Central Bohemian Region of the Czech Republic. It has about 900 inhabitants.

== Administrative division ==
Bobnice consists of two municipal parts (in brackets population according to the 2021 census):

- Bobnice (638)
- Kovansko (217)

== Etymology ==
The name is probably derived from the Czech word bobník, meaning 'bean grower'. Bobnice was a village of such people.

== Geography ==
Bobnice is located about 3 kilometres (2 mi) north of Nymburk and 39 km (24 mi) east of Prague. It lies in a flat agricultural landscape in the Central Elbe Table. The Klobuš Stream and several other small streams that are Klobuš's tributaries flow through the municipal territory.

== History ==
The first written mention of Bobnice is from 1363. From 1547, the village belonged to the Poděbrady estate. During the Thirty Years' War, the village was completely destroyed, but was soon re-established.

The village of Kovansko was founded by Germans from the Province of Silesia in 1785.

== Demographics ==
Historical population

Year	Pop.	±%
1869	763	—
1880	915	+19.9%
1890	983	+7.4%
1900	1,078	+9.7%
1910	1,100	+2.0%

Year	Pop.	±%
1921	1,129	+2.6%
1930	1,255	+11.2%
1950	940	−25.1%
1961	979	+4.1%
1970	908	−7.3%

Year	Pop.	±%
1980	821	−9.6%
1991	736	−10.4%
2001	724	−1.6%
2011	865	+19.5%
2021	855	−1.2%

Source: Censuses

== Transport ==
The railway line Nymburk–Jičín runs through the northern part of the municipality, outside the built-up area. The train station called Jíkev, named after the neighbouring municipality of Jíkev, is located here on the railway line.

== Sights ==
There are no protected cultural monuments in the municipality.
