= Pašinka =

- Municipality
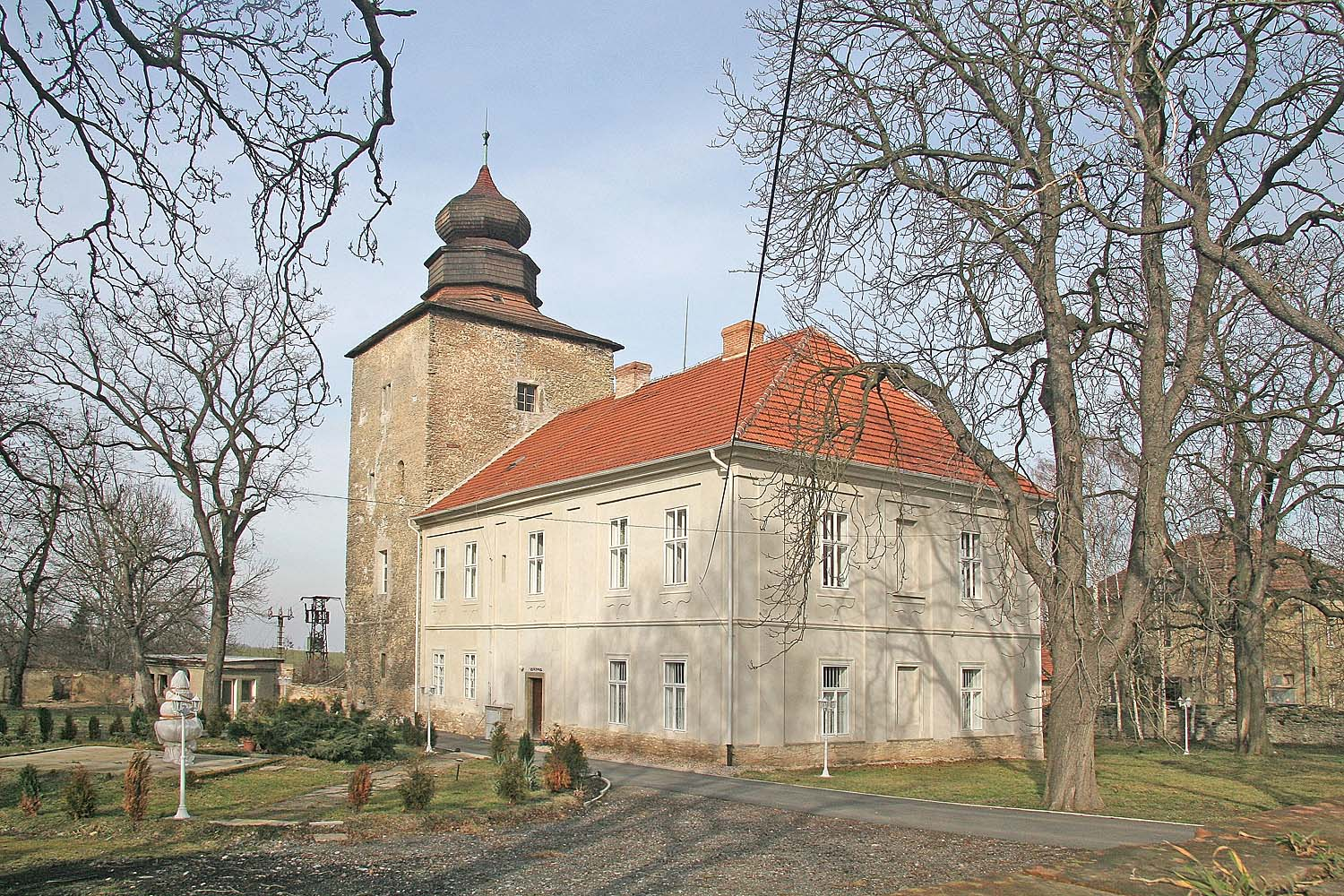
- Pašinka fort

- Location in the Czech Republic
- Coordinates: 49°59′47″N 15°11′11″E
- Country: Czech Republic
- Region: Central Bohemian
- District: Kolín
- First mentioned: 1374

Area
  - Total: 3.82 km^{2} (1.47 sq mi)
- Elevation: 367 m (1,204 ft)

Population (2026-01-01)
  - Total: 397
  - Density: 104/km^{2} (269/sq mi)
- Time zone: UTC+1 (CET)
  - Summer (DST): UTC+2 (CEST)
- Postal code: 280 02
- Website: www.obec-pasinka.cz

Pašinka is a municipality and village in Kolín District in the Central Bohemian Region of the Czech Republic. It has about 400 inhabitants.

== Demographics ==
Historical population
| Year | Pop. | ±% |
|---|---|---|
| 1869 | 375 | — |
| 1880 | 404 | +7.7% |
| 1890 | 474 | +17.3% |
| 1900 | 452 | −4.6% |
| 1910 | 477 | +5.5% |
| 1921 | 516 | +8.2% |
| 1930 | 463 | −10.3% |
| 1950 | 437 | −5.6% |
| 1961 | 459 | +5.0% |
| 1970 | 429 | −6.5% |
| 1980 | 369 | −14.0% |
| 1991 | 332 | −10.0% |
| 2001 | 318 | −4.2% |
| 2011 | 343 | +7.9% |
| 2021 | 343 | +0.0% |
Source: Censuses

== Notable people ==
- Václav Radimský (1867–1946), painter; died here
