= Ludmila Dvořáková =

Czech operatic soprano (1923–2015)

Ludmila Dvořáková (11 July 1923 in Kolín – 30 July 2015 in Prague) was a Czech operatic soprano.

== Biography ==
Dvořáková studied at the Prague Conservatory. Her operatic debut was in the title role of Katya Kabanova in Ostrava in 1949.

In the early 1950s Dvořáková was engaged in Vienna, and sang Elisabeth in Don Carlos and the Kostelnicka in Jenůfa under Mackerras; in East Berlin she was heard as Octavian in Der Rosenkavalier. Beginning in 1960 she was the dramatic soprano at the Berlin State Opera, and also performed in London, New York, Munich and Paris. Between 1965 and 1971 she sang at Bayreuth, appearing as Gutrune, Venus, Kundry, Ortrud and Brünnhilde, the latter role also being sung the following year under Solti at Covent Garden, with whom she also sang Isolde, a role she later sang under Colin Davis.

Dvořáková sang at prominent opera houses throughout the world, including the Met.

Dvořáková was married to conductor Rudolf Vašata (d. 1982), a pupil of Václav Talich, whom she met in Ostrava and with whom she recorded an LP of Wagner operatic excerpts. She was Gutrune on the Karl Böhm recording of Götterdämmerung in 1967.

Dvořáková was awarded the National Prize of the German Democratic Republic in 1972. She retired in 1985. In 2012 she was awarded the Antonin Dvořák Prize, presented by the Academy of Performing Arts in Prague, Music and Dance Faculty (HAMU) in recognition of individuals who promote and popularise Czech music.

On 30 July 2015, Ludmila Dvořáková died in a fire at her home in Prague.
