= Ovčáry (Kolín District) =

- Municipality
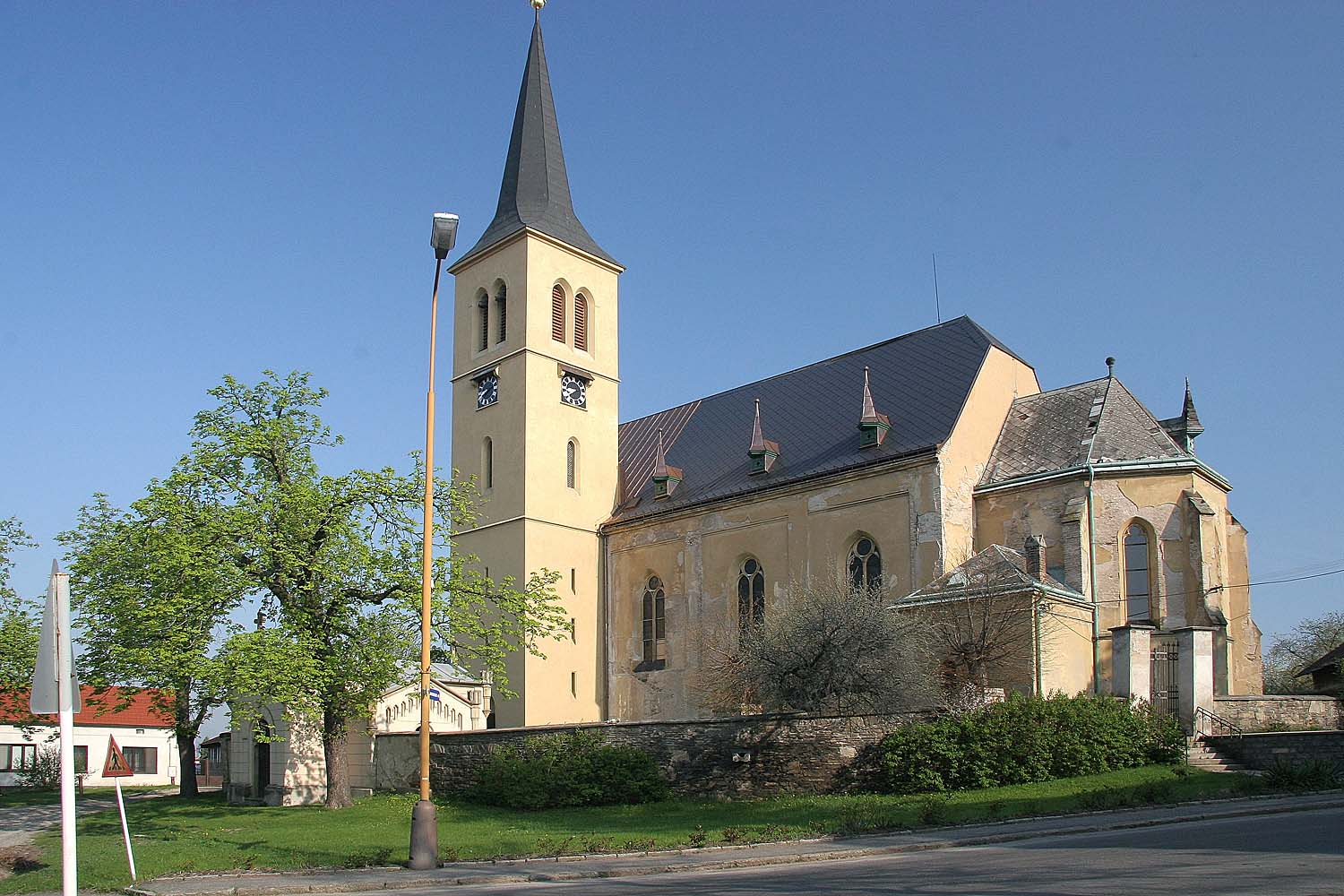
- Church of Saint James the Great

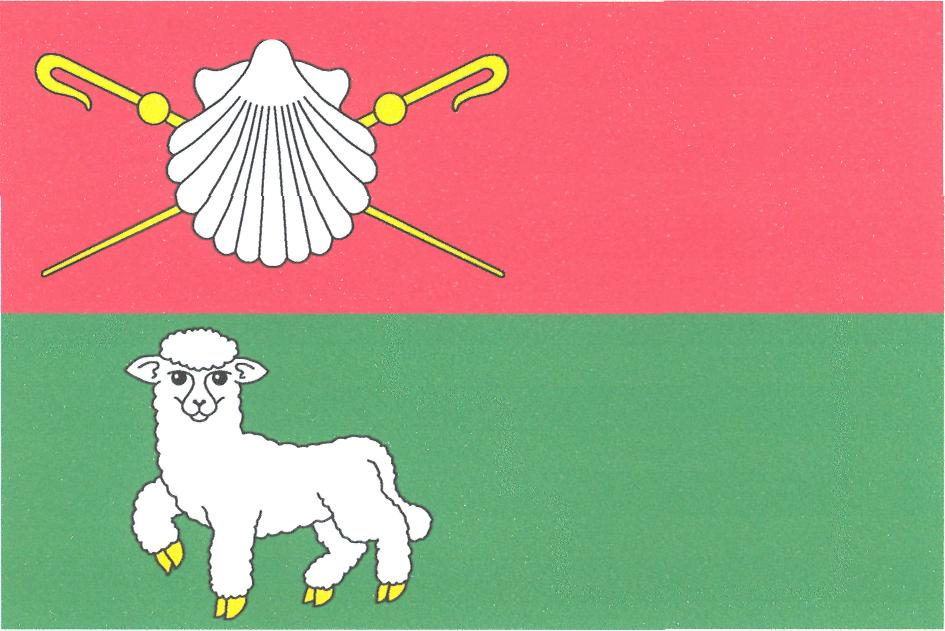
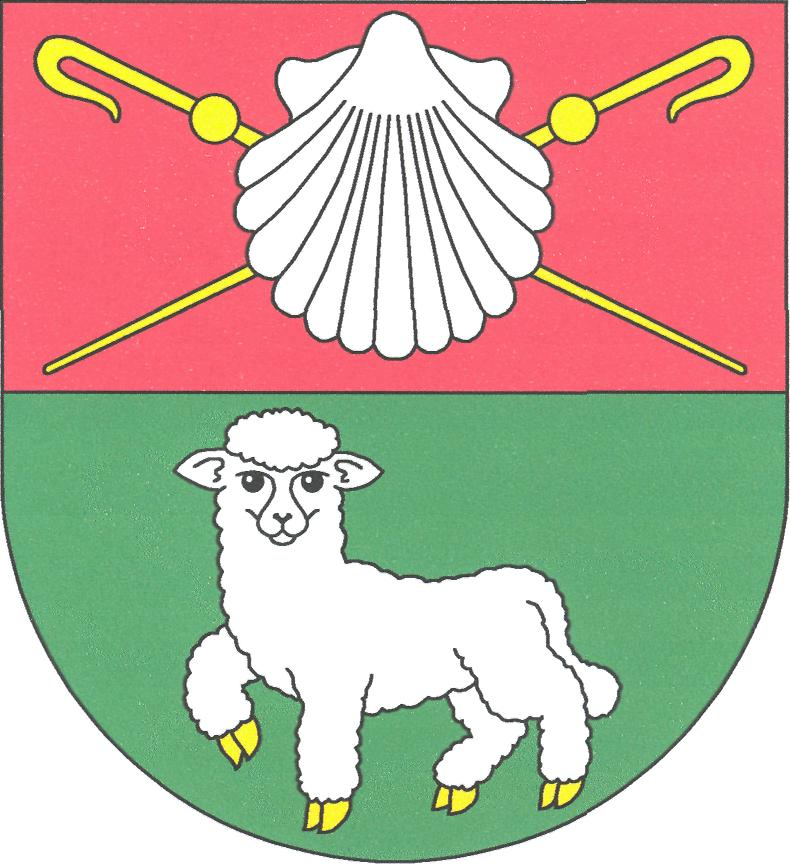
- Flag Coat of arms

- Location in the Czech Republic
- Coordinates: 50°3′46″N 15°14′22″E
- Country: Czech Republic
- Region: Central Bohemian
- District: Kolín
- First mentioned: 1273

Area
  - Total: 10.37 km^{2} (4.00 sq mi)
- Elevation: 215 m (705 ft)

Population (2026-01-01)
  - Total: 921
  - Density: 88.8/km^{2} (230/sq mi)
- Time zone: UTC+1 (CET)
  - Summer (DST): UTC+2 (CEST)
- Postal code: 280 02
- Website: www.ovcary-obec.cz

Ovčáry (German: Owtschar) is a municipality and village in Kolín District in the Central Bohemian Region of the Czech Republic. It has about 900 inhabitants.

== Etymology ==
The name is derived from the Czech word ovčář ('sheep breeder', 'sheep seller').

== Geography ==
Ovčáry is located about 4 kilometres (2 mi) northeast of Kolín and 50 km (31 mi) east of Prague. It lies in the Central Elbe Table within the Polabí lowland region. The highest point is the hill Horka at 249 m (817 ft) above sea level. The streams Hluboký potok and Sendražický potok flow through the municipality.

== History ==
The first written mention of Ovčáry is from 1273, when it was owned by the Strahov Monastery. From 1436 to 1850, the village was part of the Kolín estate.

== Demographics ==
Historical population

Year	Pop.	±%
1869	748	—
1880	771	+3.1%
1890	807	+4.7%
1900	871	+7.9%
1910	954	+9.5%

Year	Pop.	±%
1921	966	+1.3%
1930	932	−3.5%
1950	831	−10.8%
1961	817	−1.7%
1970	757	−7.3%

Year	Pop.	±%
1980	722	−4.6%
1991	672	−6.9%
2001	664	−1.2%
2011	815	+22.7%
2021	841	+3.2%

Source: Censuses

== Economy ==
In Ovčáry is the larger part of Kolín–Ovčáry Industrial Zone, known mostly for the factory of the automobile manufacturing company TMMCZ.

== Sights ==
The main landmark is the Church of Saint James the Great. It was built in the neo-Gothic style in 1906–1908, when it replaced an old Gothic church.
