= Vincenc Morstadt =

Czech painter and graphic artist

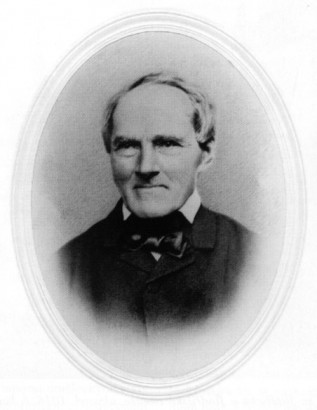
- Born: 17 April 1802; Kolín, Bohemia, Austrian Empire
- Died: 19 February 1875 (aged 72); Prague, Bohemia, Austria-Hungary
- Education: Charles University
- Known for: Landscape painting, vedute

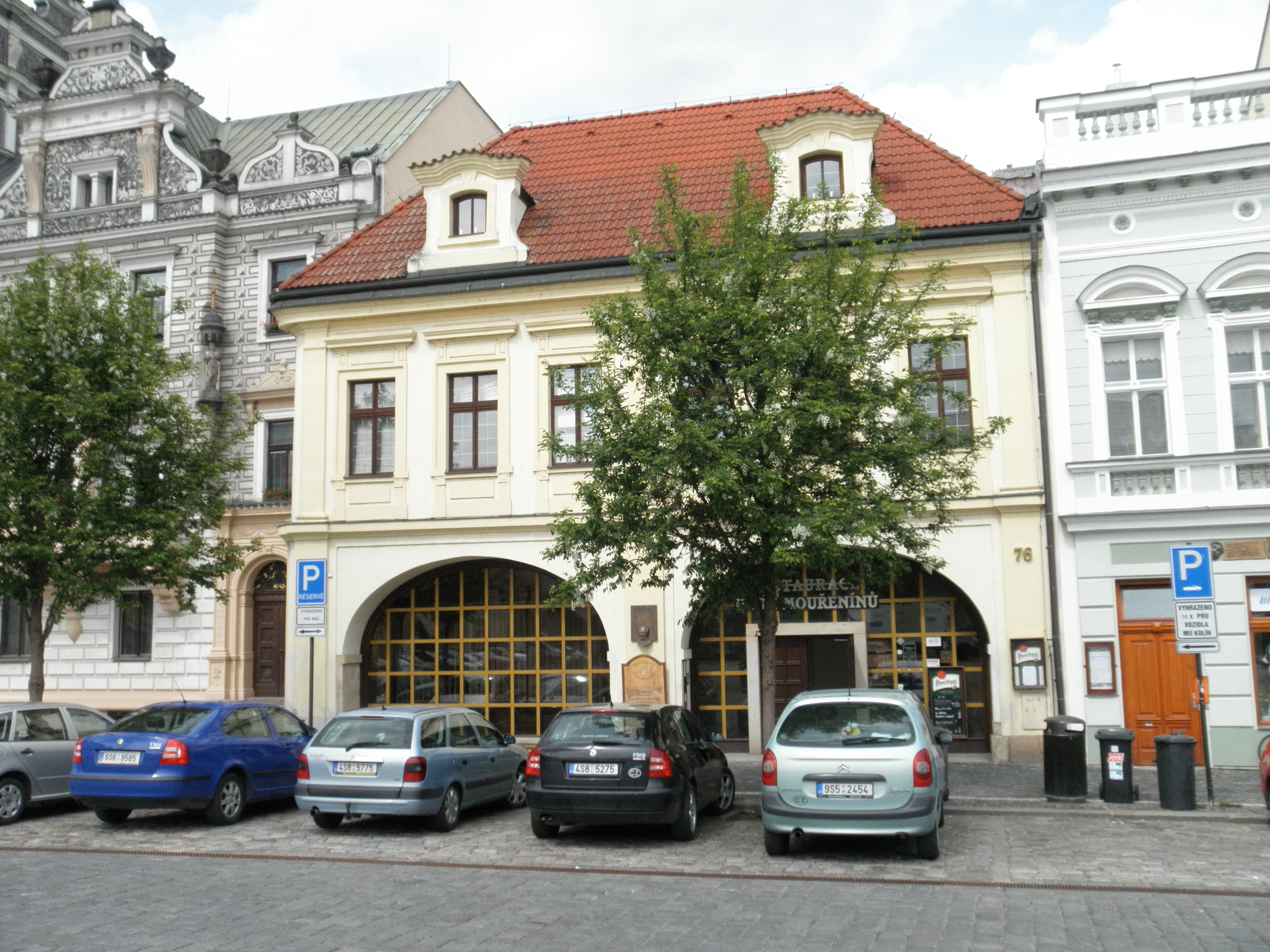
Vincenc Morstadt's birthplace, Karlovo Square 76, Kolín

Vincenc Morstadt (17 April 1802 – 19 February 1875) was a Czech painter, illustrator and lawyer. He was mainly a landscape painter, vedutist and author of many graphic prints and albums.

== Life ==
Morstadt was born on 17 April 1802 in Kolín. He was born to a family of German origin. His grandfather came from Baden, got married in Kolín, and after serving as a military surgeon in the Theresian army, he settled there. Vincenc's father was a baker and wine merchant in Kolín. At the age of eleven, Vincenc came to Prague to study at the Piarist gymnasium in New Town. He continued his studies at the Faculty of Law of Charles University. After his graduation in 1834–1850 he worked at the regional court in Loket. His earliest graphic works are of the landscape in this region – Loket, Karlovy Vary and the surrounding area, such as the Svatoš Rocks. Morstadt's drawings soon attracted the attention of editors of Prague magazines. First they were published in Hyllos, edited by Václav Radomil Kramer and Jan Hýbl, and later as separate sheets. He continued his clerical career at the courts in Trutnov and Hradec Králové. At the end of his life he lived in Prague on Tomášská Street in the Malá Strana quarter. He maintained contacts with historians František Palacký, Václav Vladivoj Tomek and other leading patriots.

He died on 19 February 1875 in Prague, at the age of 72. Morstadtova Street in Prague is named in his honour.

== Art ==
He specialised as a landscape painter and vedutist – he mainly captured important buildings, streets and public spaces of Czech towns and cities, and liked to fill them with various characters – burghers, craftsmen or merchants. Most of his works were created during his court practice, originally as pencil drawings, which he usually left to printmakers or lithographers to execute using etching and colouring techniques. Gradually these prints were combined into albums. From 1867 he devoted himself exclusively to painting.

== Gallery ==
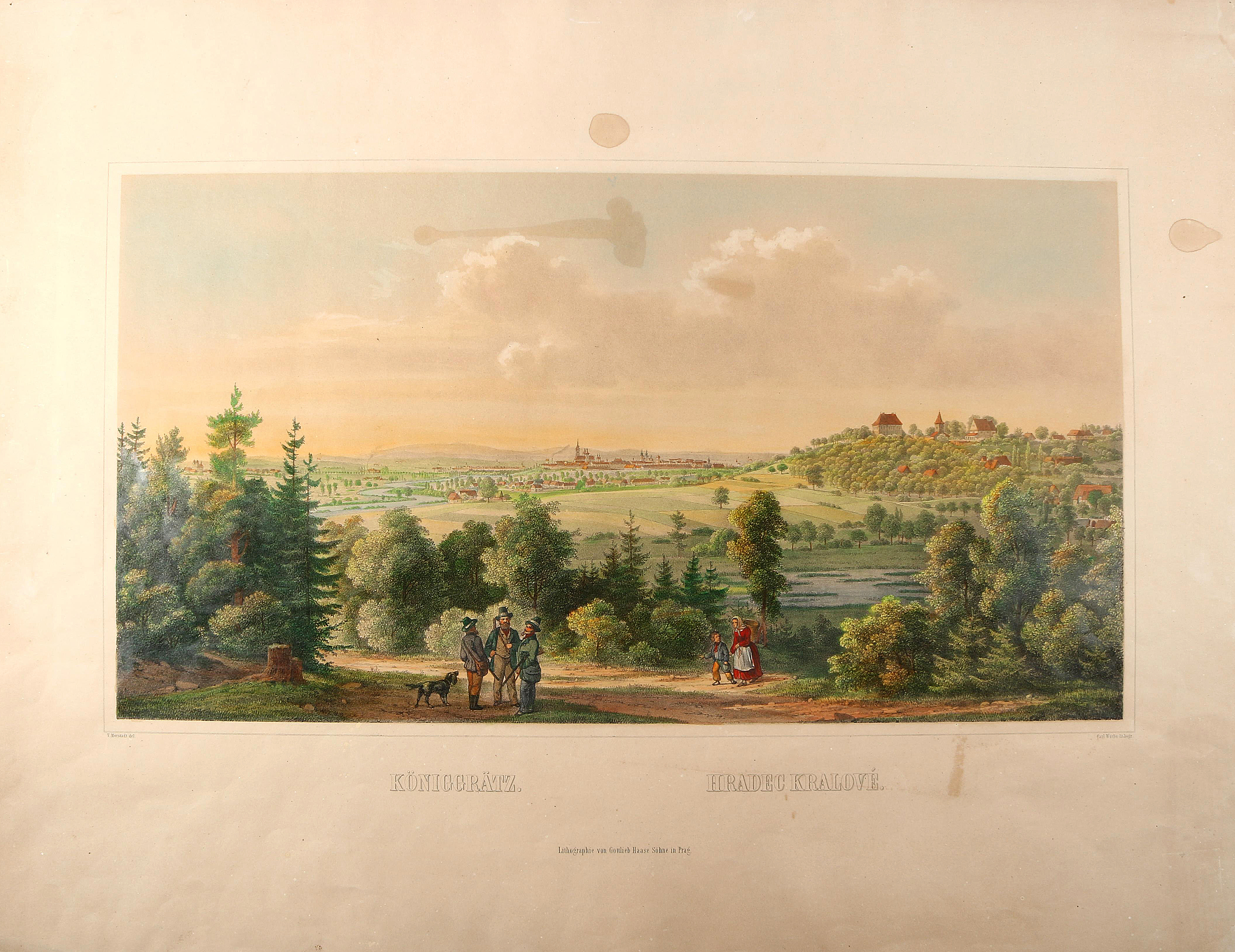
Hradec Králové

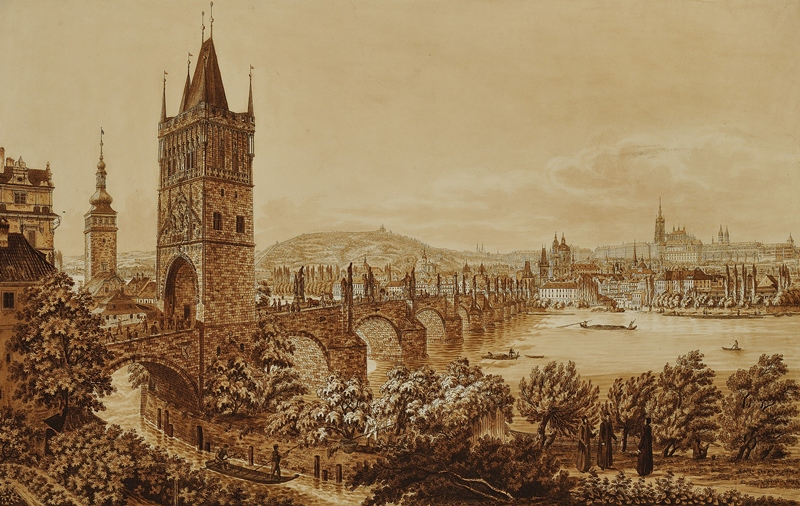
Hradčany and Lesser Quarter

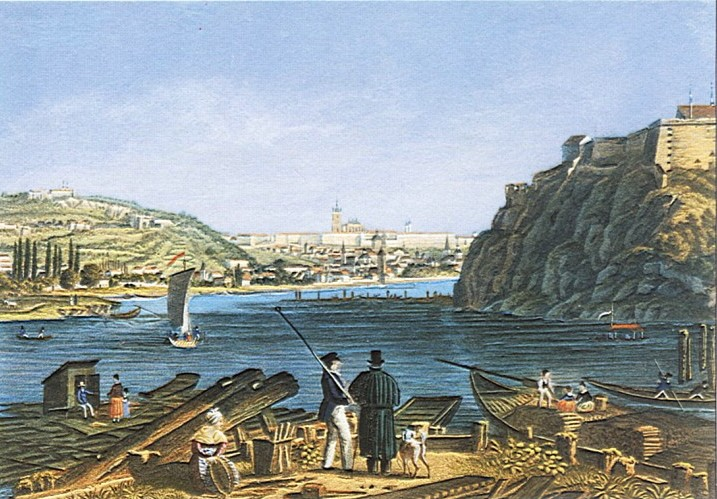
A view of Prague Castle from Vyšehrad

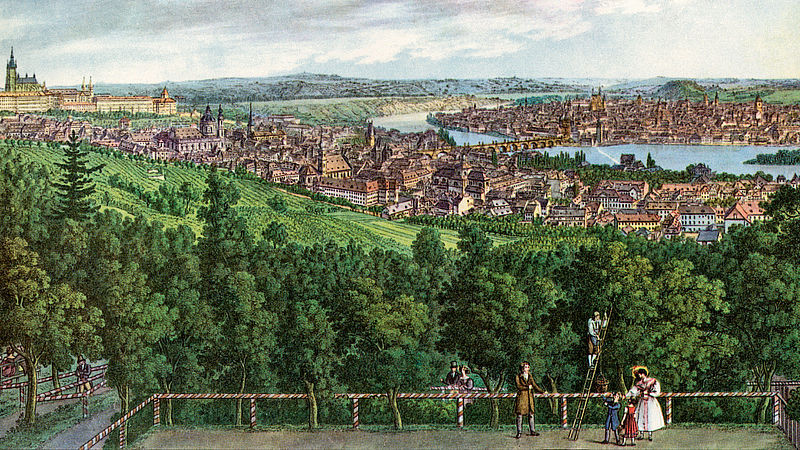
A view of Petřín from Nebozízek

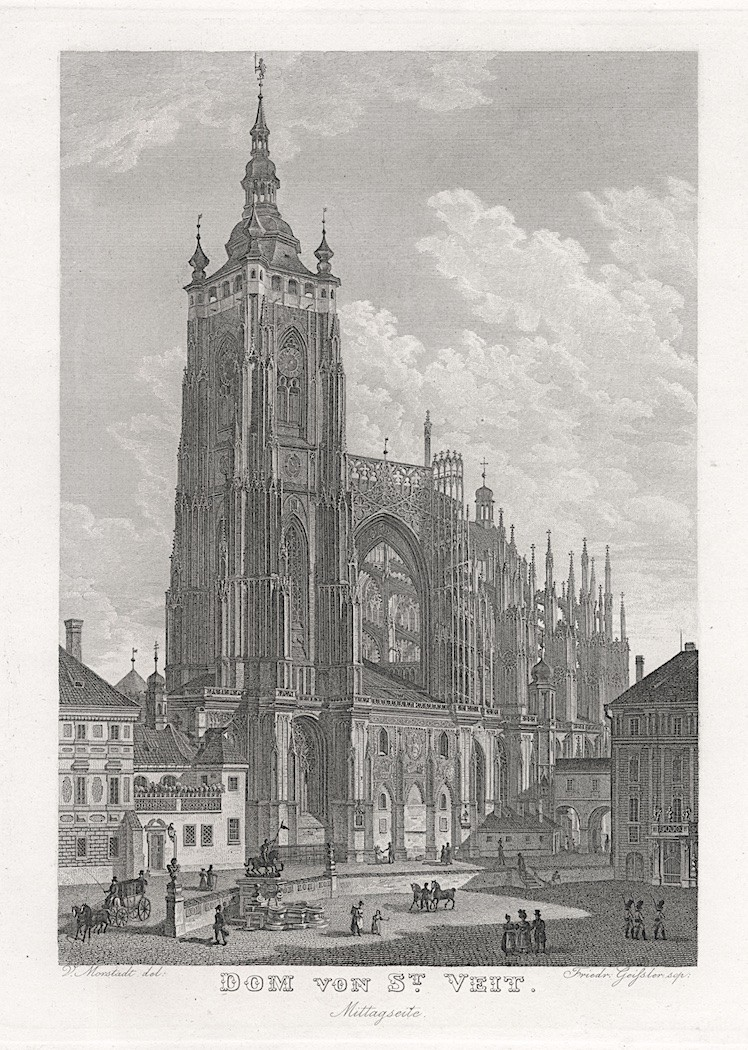
St. Vitus Cathedral

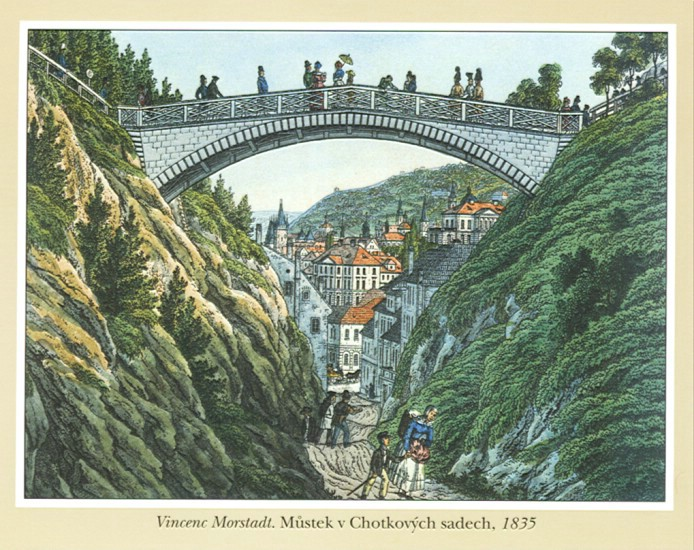
Bridge over Deer Moat to Chotek's Gardens

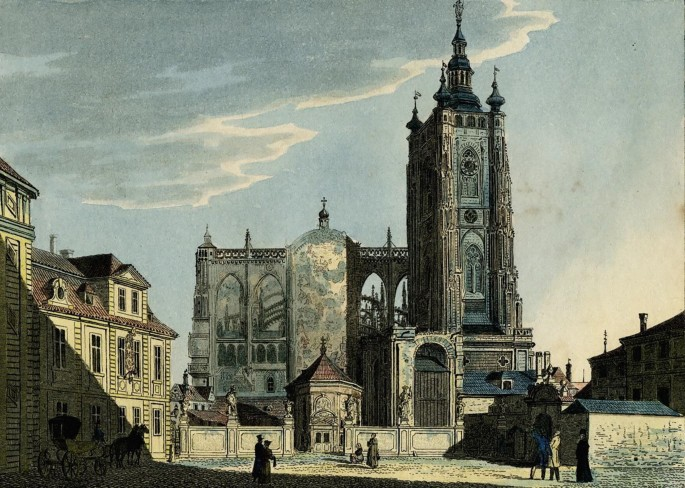
Western facade of St Vitus Cathedral (1825)
