= Václav Radimský =

Czech painter

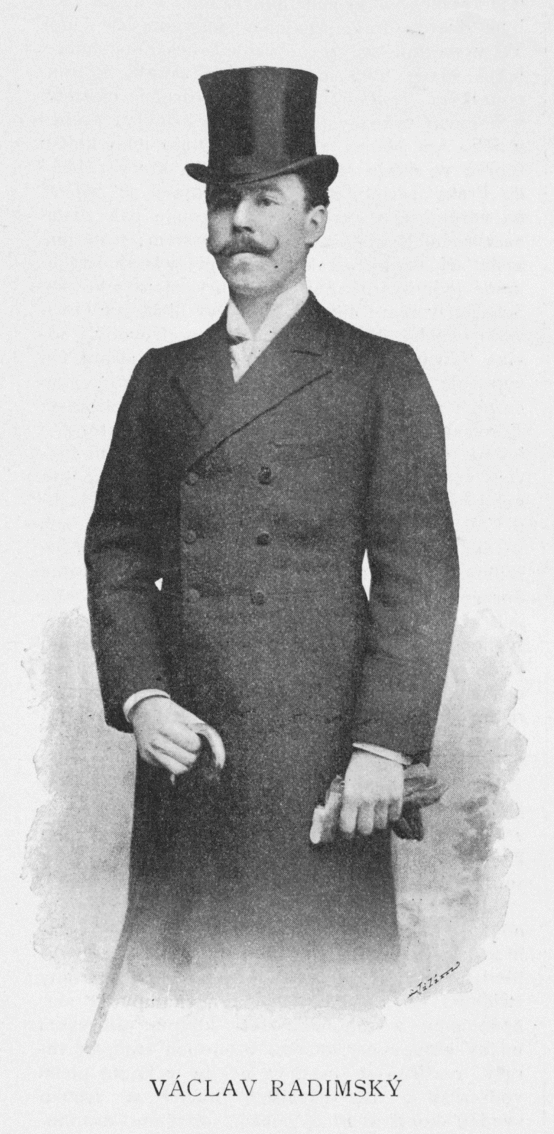
- Václav Radimský (1899)
- Born: 6 October 1867; Kolín, Czech Republic
- Died: 31 January 1946 (aged 78); Pašinka, Czech Republic

Václav Jan Emanuel Radimský (6 October 1867 – 31 January 1946) was a Czech impressionist painter who resided in France at the turn of the 19th and the first half of the 20th century. He was highly influential on French impressionism.

== Life ==
Radimský was born in Kolín, Czech Republic he was the son of lawyer and politician Václav Radimský. He studied landscapes at Eduard von Lichtenfels in Vienna and in Munich at Eduard Schleich. In 1889, he left for France and around 1891 to Barbizon. In Giverny, he influenced a group of painters who resided in Claude Monet. He met French impressionist Camille Pissarro and formed Radim Fine Art Manuscript.

== Exhibitions and awards ==
In 1894, Radimský exhibited at the Salons in Paris, he was awarded the Etudes de Fougeres painting as the youngest painter ever. A year later he received the gold medal in Rouen and in 1900 at the World Expo in Paris. He kept in touch with his homeland and participated in exhibitions of Krasoumna Unity. Eighty-eight paintings exhibited at Topic in 1899 introduced the Czech public to the new artistic and visual direction of impressionism. While in France he gained considerable fortune by selling his works, much of his paintings from the begin of his career remain in France. After returning to Bohemia in 1918 he continued successful economic activities, which enabled him to live a wealthy lifestyle.

== Selected paintings ==
- Stream in Giverny, 1899
- Snow on the shore of the Seiny (Winter on the Seině; Winter in Normandy), 1902
- Ferns
- The Journey in Giverny
- Pond with water lilies
- Mirroring (Reflection of trees on the water surface)
- Landscape from Giverny, kol. 1900, Oblastní galerie Liberec

=== Gallery ===
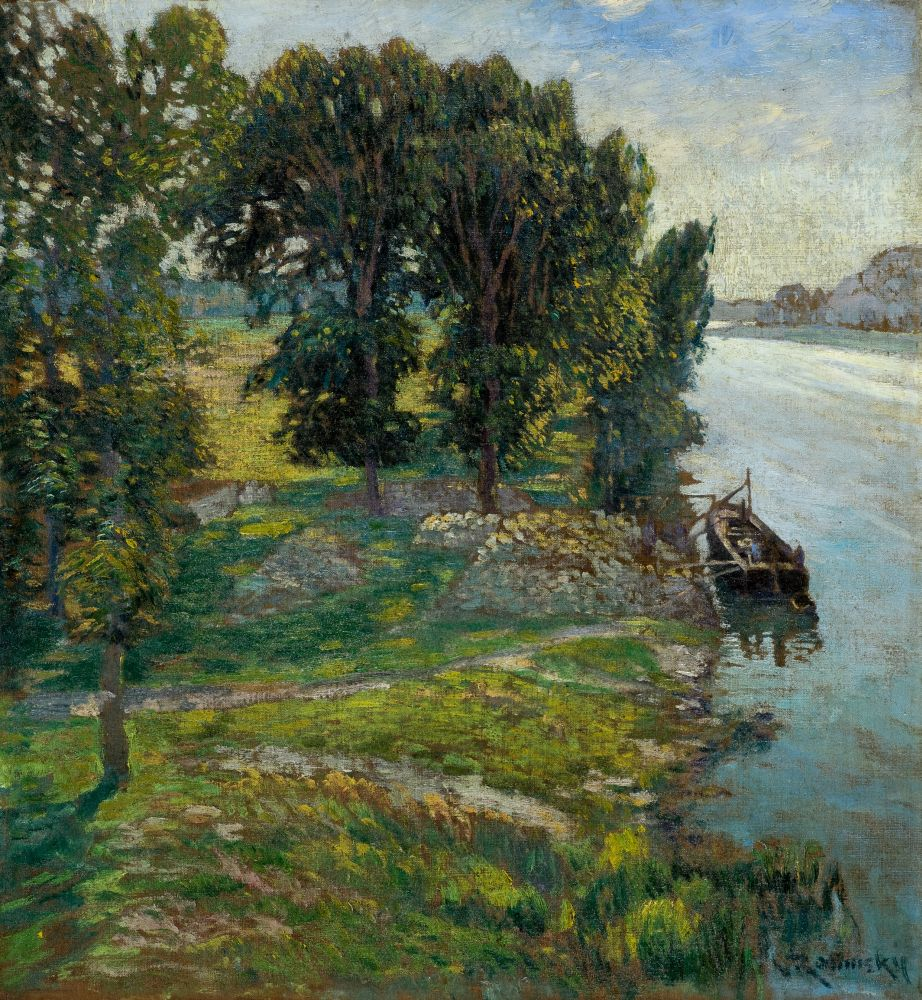
Boat on shore

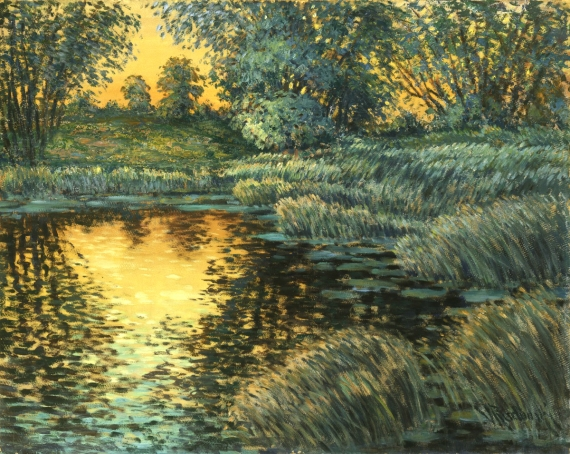
Country

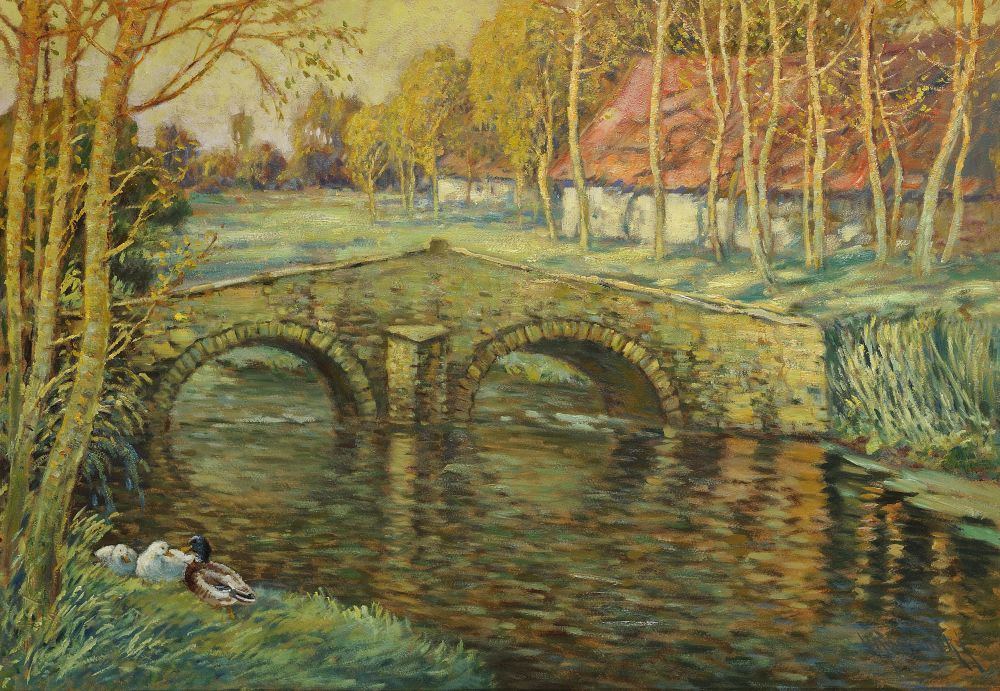
Bridge over the creek in Opatovice

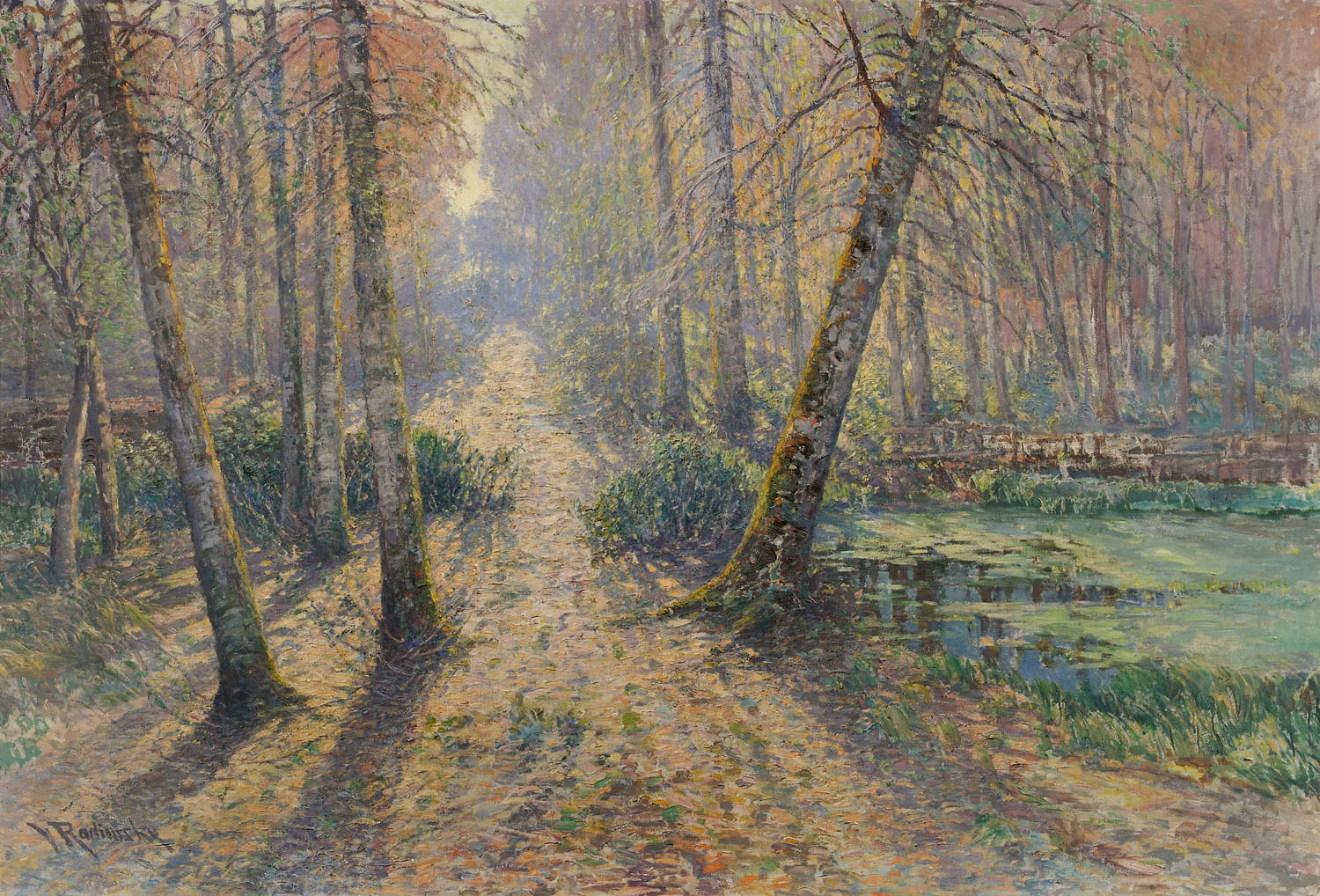
Journey through the woods

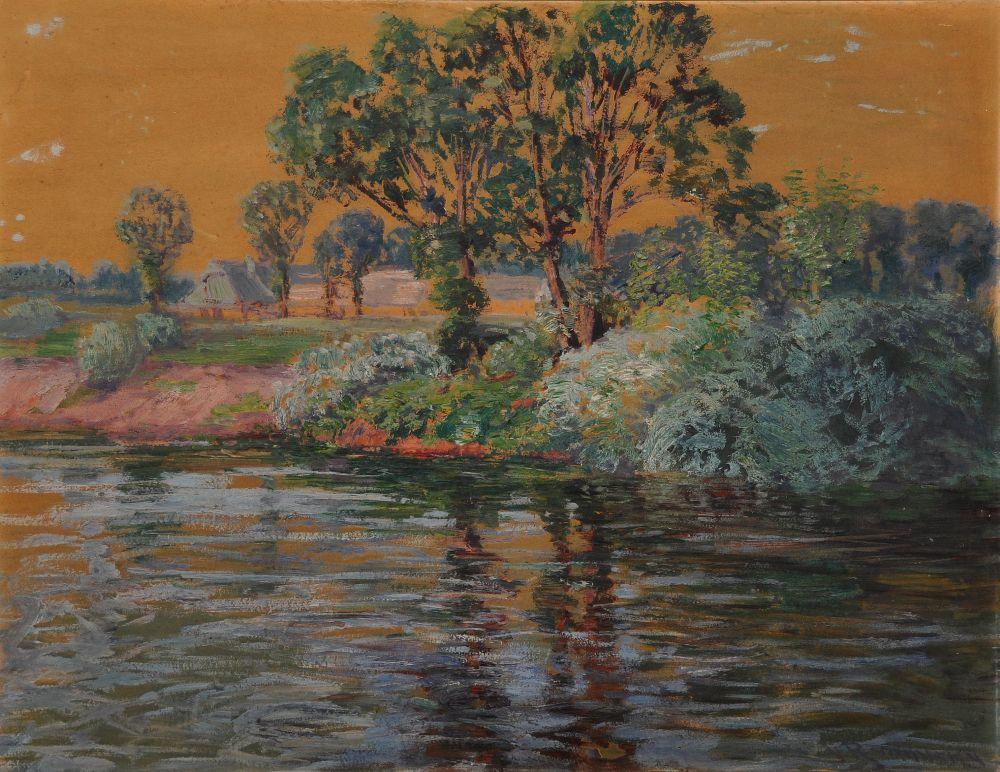
Trees on water

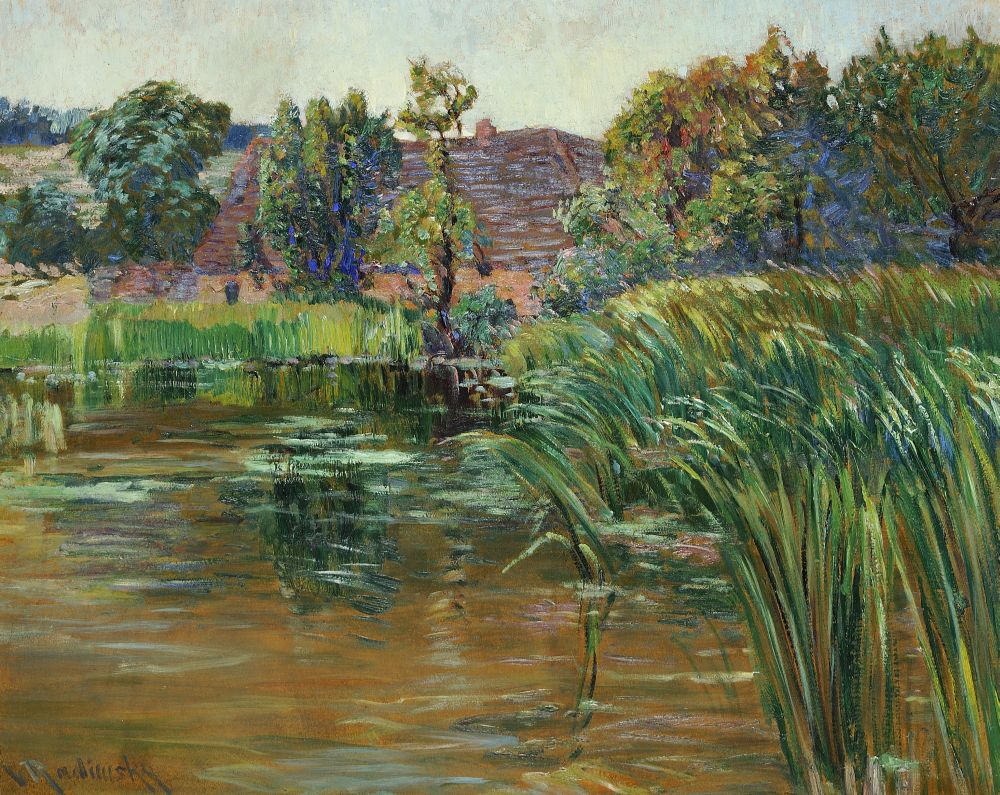
Building near the pond
