= Obchodní tiskárny Kolín =

Czech printing firm

- Company type: Joint-stock company
- Founded: 1879; 19 December 2006
- Headquarters: Kolín, Czech Republic
- Website: www.otk.cz/en/

Obchodní tiskárny Kolín or OTK, today known as OTK Group, a.s. or OTK printing & packaging a.s., is a Czech printing firm based in Kolín founded in 1879. Today it produces a wide range of paper and card products including labels, and packaging.

== History ==
The company was founded in 1879 by Prague typographer, J. L. Bayer as a lithographic printing office producing calendars and colour pictures. It became the biggest domestic producer of calendars, but also expanded its operations to manufacture books for business. During the first half of the 20th century the company exported to eastern and central Europe.

After the World War II, the firm was rebranded and nationalised under communism as Obchodní tiskárny Kolín and it continued to expand its range, producing forms for computer technology, labels, playing cards and calendars. New premises were built. The firm was denationalised in 1989 and has since continued to expand. In 2006, the OTK Group was formed with subsidiaries in Germany, Romania and Russia.

== Products ==
Today, OTK's products include: flexible packaging, graphic labels, self-adhesive labels, mercantile products, shrink-sleeve labels, in-mould labels and 'smart pack'.

=== Playing cards ===
OTK was a major manufacturer of traditional playing cards of the Bohemian pattern, some marketing under a Pegasus motif that was inherited from the cardmakers, Ritter & Cie., of Prague. However, OTK discontinued this activity, and the Pegasus branded cards are now since 2010 manufactured by the Společnost Hrací karty 1884 company.
