= Ovčáry (Mělník District) =

- Municipality
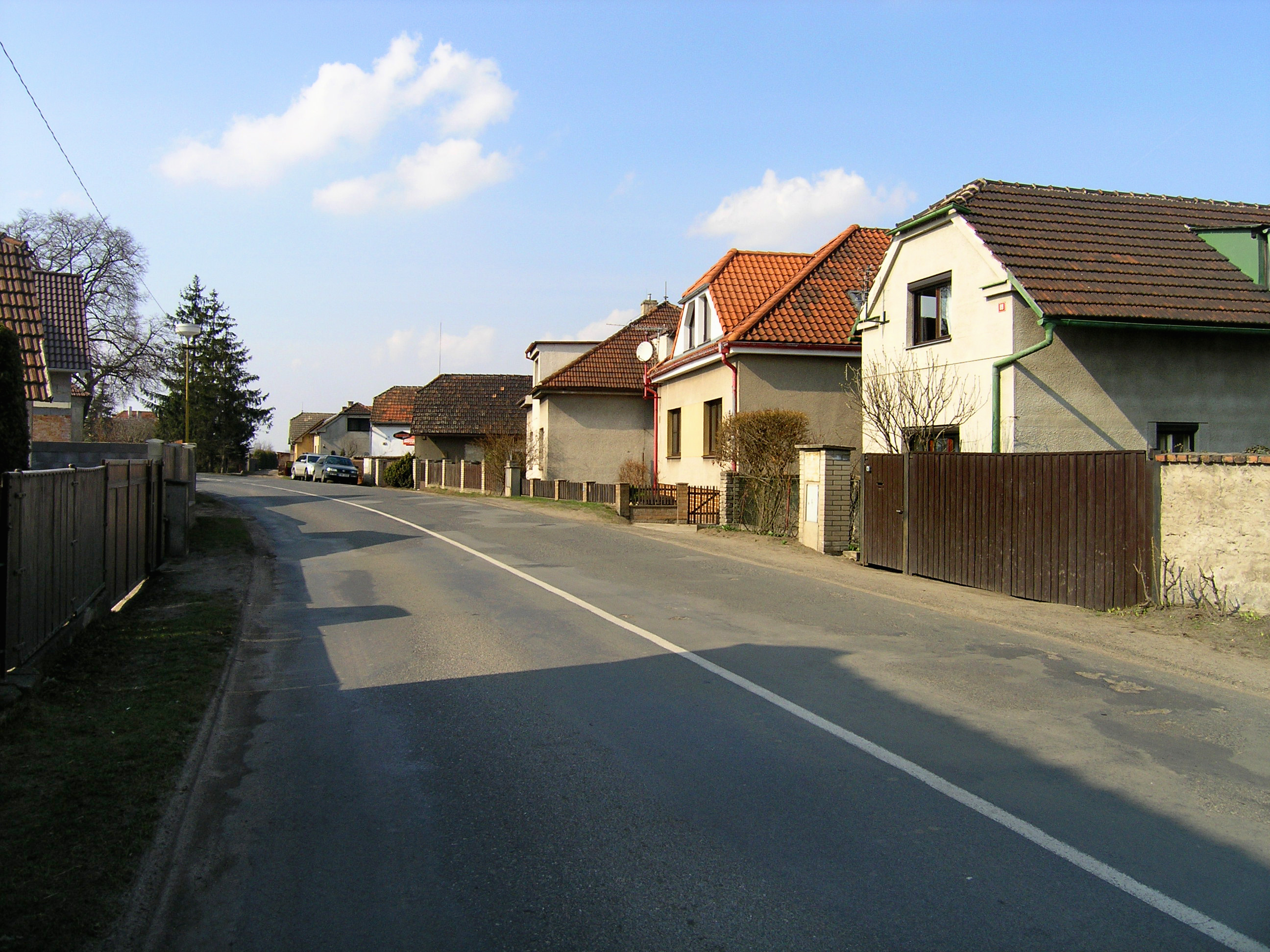
- Main street

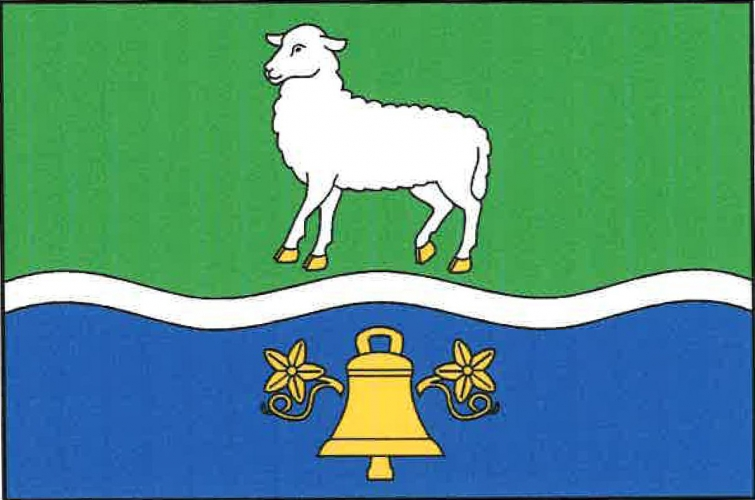
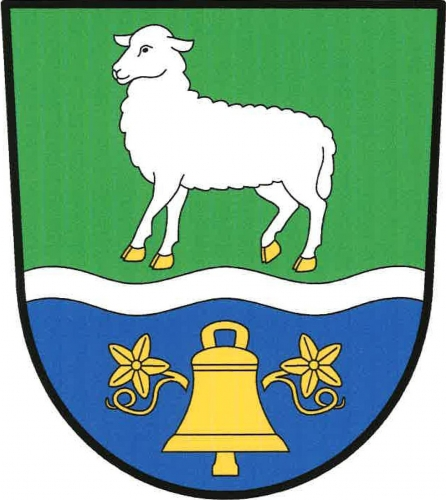
- Flag Coat of arms

- Location in the Czech Republic
- Coordinates: 50°15′11″N 14°36′50″E
- Country: Czech Republic
- Region: Central Bohemian
- District: Mělník
- First mentioned: 1350

Area
  - Total: 3.72 km^{2} (1.44 sq mi)
- Elevation: 171 m (561 ft)

Population (2026-01-01)
  - Total: 525
  - Density: 141/km^{2} (366/sq mi)
- Time zone: UTC+1 (CET)
  - Summer (DST): UTC+2 (CEST)
- Postal code: 277 14
- Website: ovcary.cz

Ovčáry is a municipality and village in Mělník District in the Central Bohemian Region of the Czech Republic. It has about 500 inhabitants.

== Demographics ==
Historical population
Year	Pop.	±%
1869	355	—
1880	407	+14.6%
1890	439	+7.9%
1900	461	+5.0%
1910	558	+21.0%
1921	587	+5.2%
1930	609	+3.7%
1950	542	−11.0%
1961	505	−6.8%
1970	452	−10.5%
1980	445	−1.5%
1991	392	−11.9%
2001	418	+6.6%
2011	445	+6.5%
2021	496	+11.5%
Source: Censuses
