= Kolín =

Town in the Czech Republic

- Town
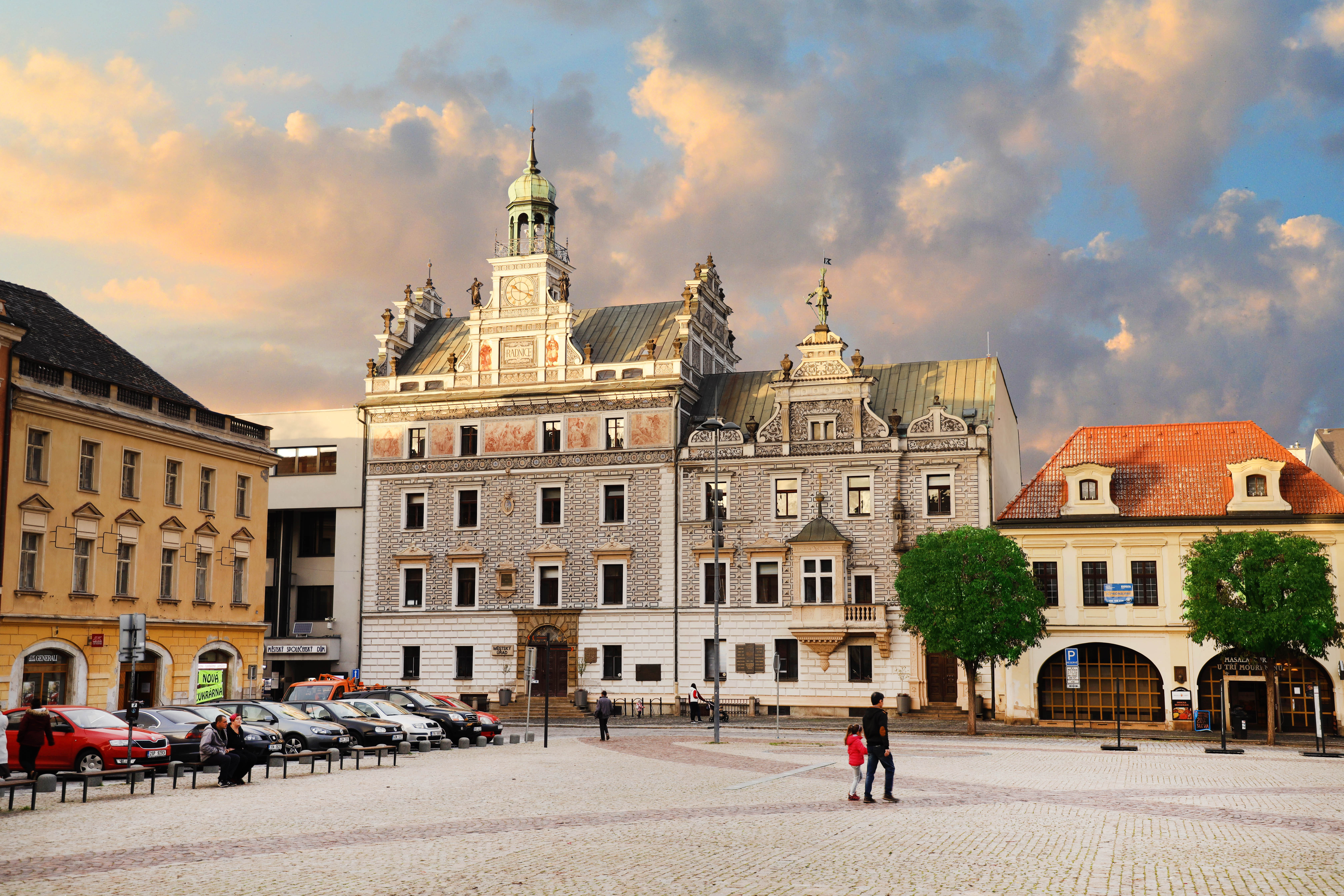
- Town hall on Karlovo náměstí

- Flag Coat of arms

- Location in the Czech Republic
- Coordinates: 50°1′41″N 15°12′2″E
- Country: Czech Republic
- Region: Central Bohemian
- District: Kolín
- First mentioned: 1261

Government
  - Mayor: Michael Kašpar (STAN)

Area
  - Total: 34.99 km^{2} (13.51 sq mi)
- Elevation: 220 m (720 ft)

Population (2026-01-01)
  - Total: 33,392
  - Density: 954.3/km^{2} (2,472/sq mi)
- Time zone: UTC+1 (CET)
  - Summer (DST): UTC+2 (CEST)
- Postal code: 280 02
- Website: www.mukolin.cz

Kolín (Czech pronunciation: [ˈkoliːn]; German: Kolin, Neu Kolin) is a town in the Central Bohemian Region of the Czech Republic. It has about 33,000 inhabitants. The town is situated in a lowland on the Elbe River.

Kolín was founded in the 13th century. The historic town centre is well preserved and is protected as an urban monument reservation. The most significant monument is the Church of Saint Bartholomew, protected as a national cultural monument.

== Administrative division ==
Kolín consists of ten municipal parts (in brackets population according to the 2021 census):

- Kolín I (1,484)
- Kolín II (12,755)
- Kolín III (3,552)
- Kolín IV (5,218)
- Kolín V (5,846)
- Kolín VI (406)
- Sendražice (1,641)
- Šťáralka (81)
- Štítary (787)
- Zibohlavy (180)

== Etymology ==
The name Kolín probably comes from the Old Czech verb koliti, i.e. "to hammer poles", and is related to the location of Starý Kolín in the often flooded area at the confluence of the Klejnárka and Elbe rivers. The soil in the vicinity of the confluence was strengthened with the help of wooden poles.

== Geography ==
Kolín is located about 47 kilometres (29 mi) east of Prague. It lies in a fertile landscape of the Central Elbe Table lowland. The Elbe River flows through the town. In the eastern part of the municipal territory is Sandberk, an artificial lake created by flooding a sandstone quarry.

== History ==
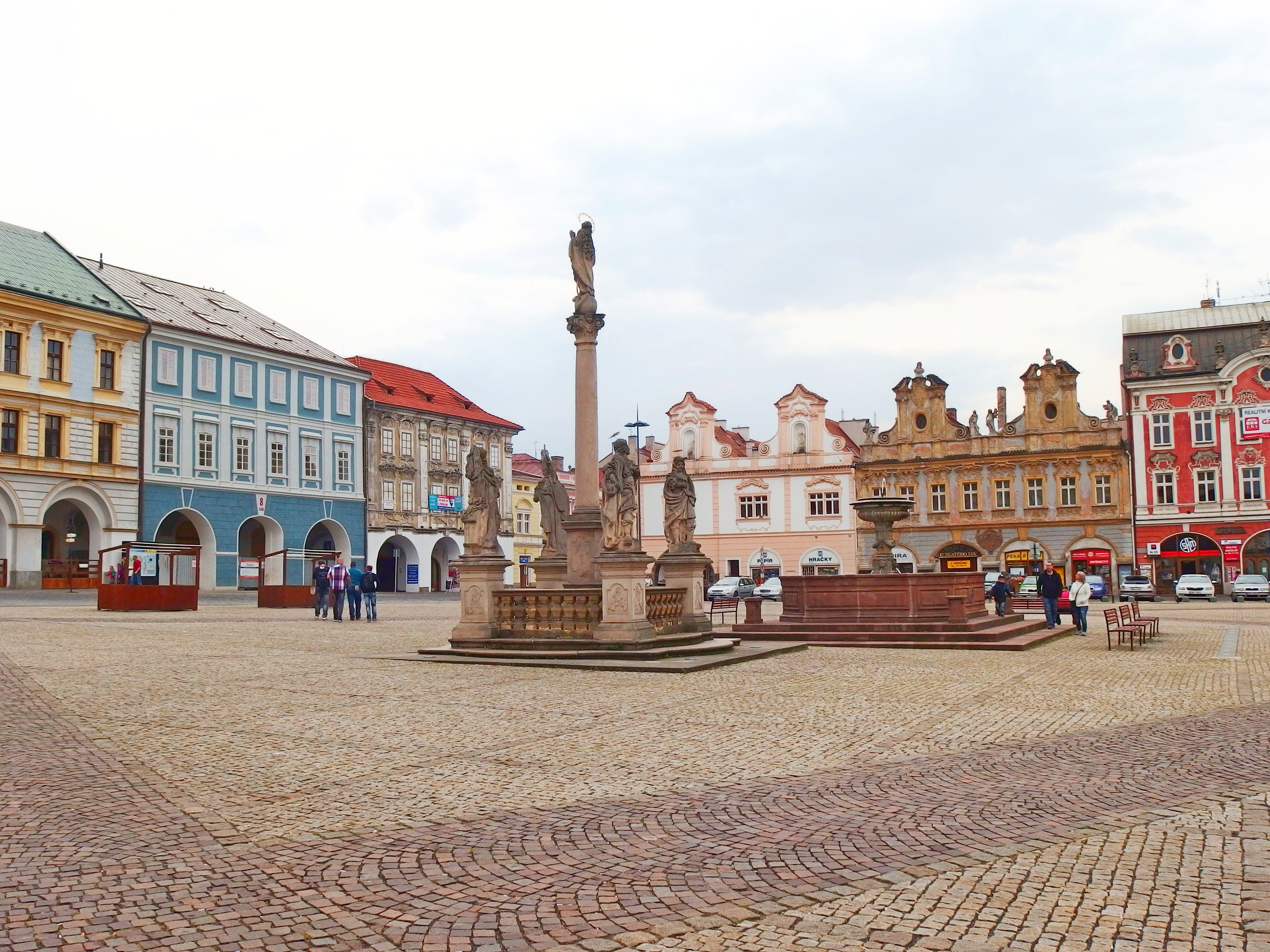
The square Karlovo náměstí

Ptolemy's world map of the 2nd century mentions Budorgis in the area of today's Kolín.

Kolín was founded by King Ottokar II in the 13th century by relocation, when Starý Kolín ('old Kolín') was threatened by floods and the king decided to move the settlement. The first written mention of Kolín is from 1261, when it was mentioned that Přelouč obtained town privileges, just like Kolín and Kouřim have. It lay on a trade route Prague–Český Brod–Čáslav–Moravia. Jewish people settled in Kolín in the 14th century. In the 13th and 14th centuries, Kolín was a rich town thanks to silver mining, but then mining began to concentrate in Kutná Hora. Germans formed the majority of the population, but Czechs predominated during the Hussite Wars (1419–1434). In 1421, the Hussites burned down the local Dominican monastery.

During the Thirty Years' War, Kolín was badly damaged. The Battle of Kolín was fought during the Seven Years' War in 1757. A new period of prosperity came during the reign of Emperor Joseph II (1780–1790). In 1845, the construction of the Prague–Kolín–Olomouc railway was finished, which was an impetus for the development of industry.

In 1944, a refinery in Kolín was bombed during the Oil Campaign of World War II. Zyklon B for the Nazi concentration camps was produced there.

== Demographics ==
Historical population

Year	Pop.	±%
1869	10,239	—
1880	12,538	+22.5%
1890	14,481	+15.5%
1900	16,339	+12.8%
1910	18,138	+11.0%

Year	Pop.	±%
1921	18,029	−0.6%
1930	20,568	+14.1%
1950	22,528	+9.5%
1961	25,301	+12.3%
1970	28,538	+12.8%

Year	Pop.	±%
1980	32,501	+13.9%
1991	31,595	−2.8%
2001	30,258	−4.2%
2011	30,922	+2.2%
2021	31,950	+3.3%

Source: Censuses

== Economy ==
In Kolín is the smaller part of Kolín–Ovčáry Industrial Zone, known mostly for the factory of the automobile manufacturing company Toyota Motor Manufacturing. As of 2020, TMM employed 2,400 people. It is the most important employer in the region.

U&C UAS manufactures reconnaissance drones and loitering munitions in Kolín.

Kolín is also home to the packaging and paper manufacturer, OTK company.

== Transport ==
Kolín is connected with Prague by the I/12 road. The I/38 road (the section from Kutná Hora to Nymburk) also runs through the town.

Kolín is a railway junction. The Kolín railway station is located on the major lines Prague–Olomouc and Prague–Brno, which further continue to Slovakia, Hungary and Poland. It also lies on the intraregional lines Prague–Havlíčkův Brod and Ústí nad Labem–Kolín.

== Sights ==
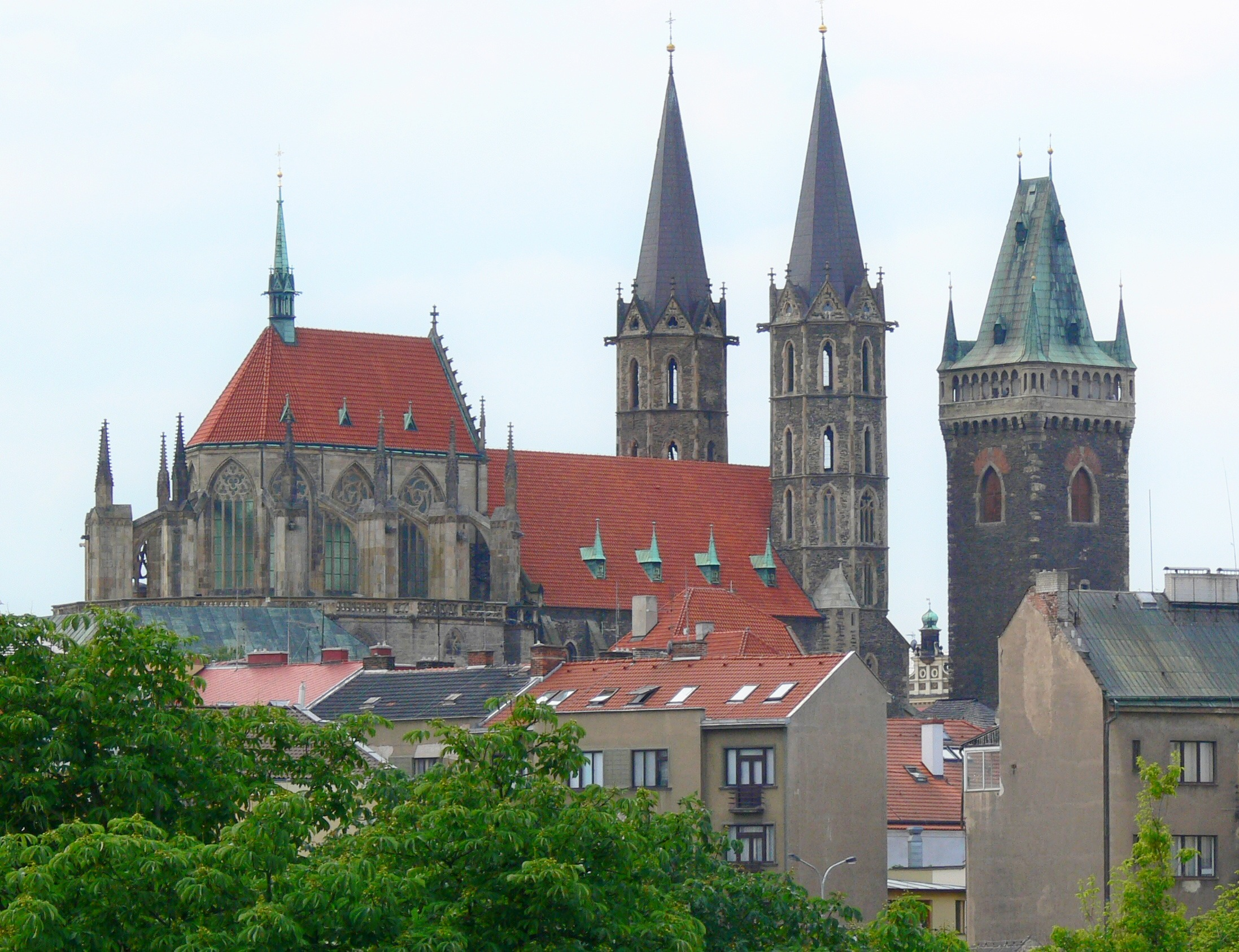
Church of Saint Bartholomew

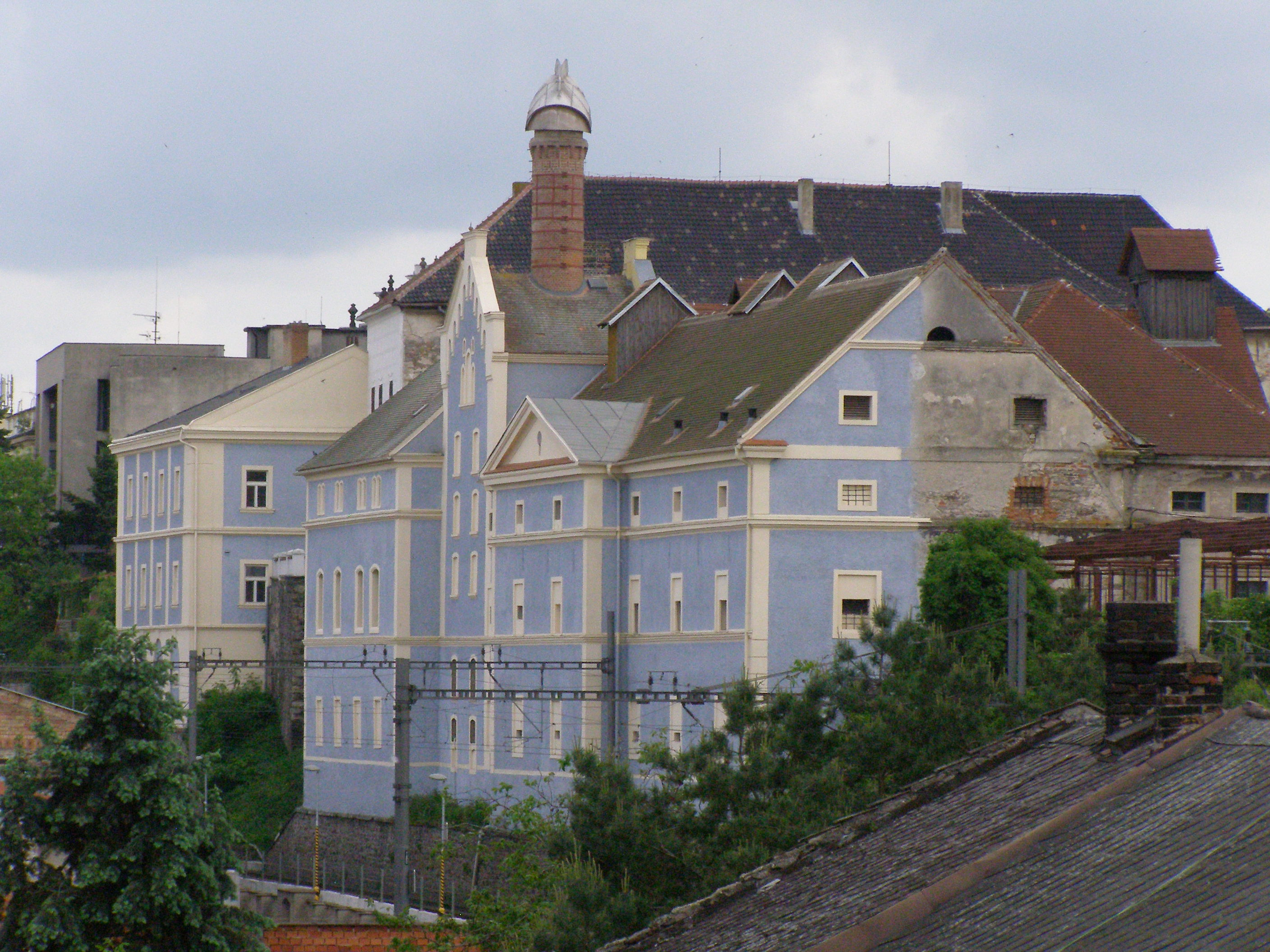
Former castle and brewery

The historical centre of the town, formed by the square Karlovo náměstí and surrounding streets, has many Gothic and Baroque buildings. The most important monument is the Church of Saint Bartholomew, protected as a national cultural monument. It has an early Gothic core from the second half of the 13th century. In the mid-14th century, it was rebuilt by the architect Peter Parler. A separate bell tower was built next to the church at the end of the 15th century. In 1878–1910, the Gothic appearance of the church was restored by Josef Mocker.

Among the main landmarks of the town square is the town hall. Originally a Gothic house from the 15th century, it was rebuilt in the Neo-Renaissance style in 1887.

A notable building is the former castle. In 1437–1448, a late Gothic castle was founded in Kolín. It was built on the ruins of the burned down monastery. At the end of the 15th century, it was extended. During the rule of the Zierotin family in 1556–1591, the castle was rebuilt in the Renaissance style. After 1591, the castle ceased to serve as an aristocratic residence and was partly used as a brewery. Part of the castle complex was demolished in 1843–1844, when the railway was built, and Neoclassical modifications were made. After 1862, the castle was fully converted into a brewery, which operated there until 1987. Today the castle is owned by the town of Kolín, but most of it is unused.

In Kolín is the original Jewish ghetto. The synagogue existed already before 1422, but was rebuilt in the early Baroque style in 1696. It is the second oldest and second most valuable synagogue in Bohemia, after the Old New Synagogue in Prague. The Jewish cemetery is one of the oldest and largest Jewish cemeteries in Bohemia. It was established in the first half of the 15th century and used until 1887. The oldest preserved tombstones are from 1492.

A technical and architectonical monument is the former water tower. It is a functionalist building from 1928, designed by Jan Vladimír Hráský and František Janda. In 2015, it was converted into an observation tower.

== Notable people ==
- Jakub Krčín (1535–1604), pond and dam constructer
- Jean-Gaspard Deburau (1796–1846), Czech-French actor and mime
- Vincenc Morstadt (1802–1875), painter and illustrator
- Josef Popper-Lynkeus (1838–1921), Austrian scholar, writer and inventor
- František Kmoch (1848–1912), composer and conductor; worked and died here
- Julius Petschek (1856–1932), industrialist
- Josef Svatopluk Machar (1864–1942), poet
- Václav Radimský (1867–1946), painter
- Terezie Brzková (1875–1966), actress
- Robert Saudek (1880–1935), graphologist and writer
- Otokar Fischer (1883–1938), literary historian, translator and poet
- Josef Sudek (1896–1976), photographer
- Václav Morávek (1904–1942), soldier and war hero
- Ludmila Dvořáková (1923–2015), operatic soprano
- Frank Daniel (1926–1996), Czech-American screenwriter and film director
- Jan Kubíček (1927–2013), constructivist painter and sculptor
- Jiří Balcar (1929–1968), graphic artist, painter and illustrator
- Luboš Dobrovský (1932–2020), politician and journalist
- Miroslav Vacek (1935–2022), politician and military leader
- Eva Randová (born 1936), operatic mezzo-soprano
- Miloš Zeman (born 1944), president of the Czech Republic in 2013–2023
- Jan Novák (born 1953), Czech-American novelist and playwright
- Jarda Svoboda (born 1966), musician
- Bohdan Ulihrach (born 1975), tennis player
- Petr Čáslava (born 1979), ice hockey player
- Barbora Poláková (born 1983), actress and singer

== Twin towns – sister cities ==
Kolín is twinned with:

- Dietikon, Switzerland
- Duino-Aurisina, Italy
- Érd, Hungary
- Kamenz, Germany
- Lubań, Poland
- Rimavská Sobota, Slovakia
