= Central Elbe Table =

Plateau in the Czech Republic

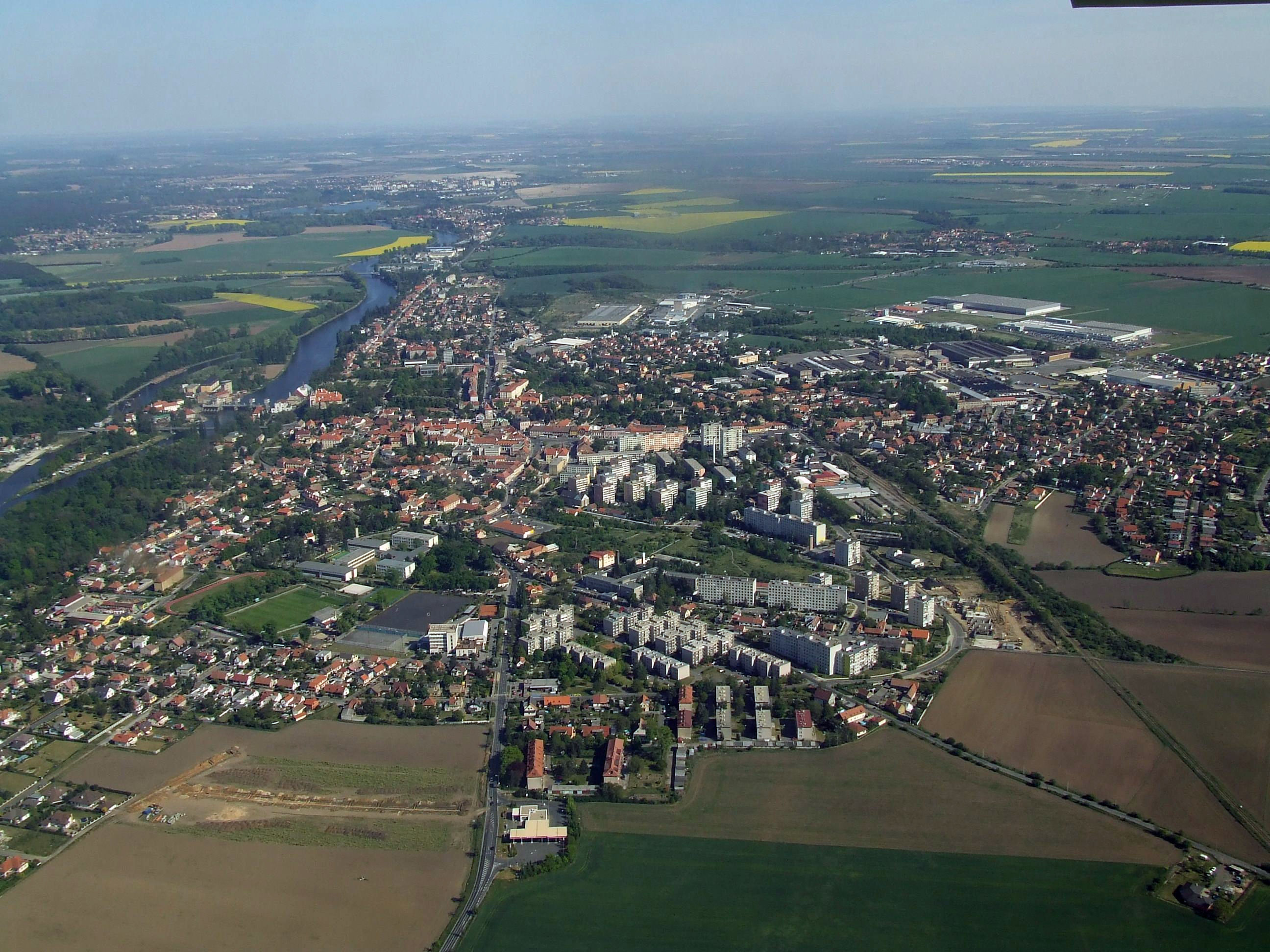
- Landscape around Brandýs nad Labem

Highest point
- Peak: Contour line in Barchovice
- Elevation: 400 m (1,300 ft)

Dimensions
- Length: 105 km (65 mi)
- Area: 2,266 km^{2} (875 mi^{2})

Geography
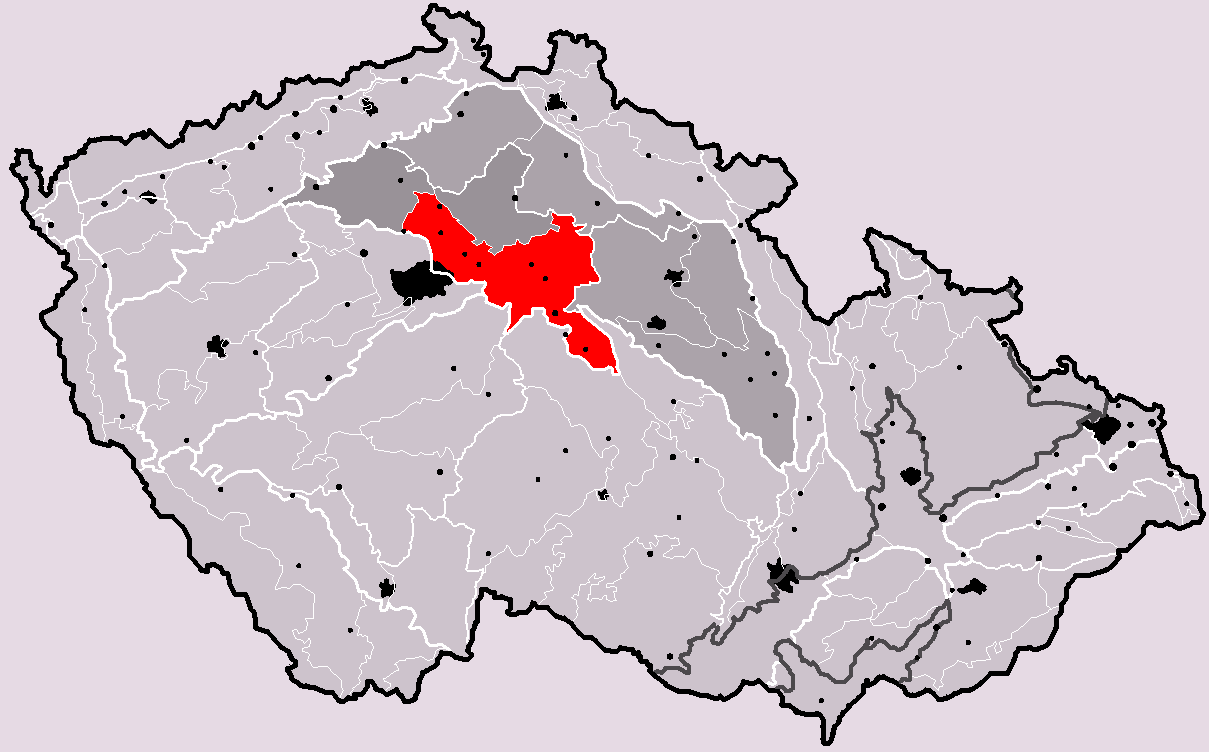
- Central Elbe Table in the geomorphological system of the Czech Republic
- Country: Czech Republic
- Region: Central Bohemian
- Range coordinates: 50°8′N 14°59′E
- Parent range: Central Bohemian Table

Geology
- Rock type(s): Sedimentary rock, basement

The Central Elbe Table (Czech: Středolabská tabule) is a plateau and a geomorphological mesoregion of the Czech Republic. It is located mostly in the Central Bohemian Region, but due to its size, it also extends to other regions. The axis of the plateau is the Elbe River, after which the territory is named.

== Geomorphology ==
The Central Elbe Table is a mesoregion of the Central Bohemian Table within the Bohemian Massif. Typical features of the landscape are wide valley floodplains, low terraces, and tectonic and denudation depressions. The plateau is further subdivided into the microregions of Nymburk Basin, Čáslav Basin, Mělník Basin, Mrlina Table and Český Brod Table.

Due to the nature of the plateau, there are no significant peaks. The highest point is the contour near the village of Radlice within Barchovice at 400 m (1,300 ft) above sea level. The highest peaks are Dílce at 366 m (1,201 ft) above sea level, U Písku at 341 m (1,119 ft) and Vinný vrch at 311 m (1,020 ft).

== Geography ==
The territory has a predominantly elongated shape from northwest to southeast. The plateau has an area of 2,266 square kilometres (875 sq mi) and an average elevation of 215 metres (705 ft). It is the sixth largest mesoregion in the Czech Republic. Most of the Central Elbe Table is located in the Central Bohemian Region, but it also extends into Prague in the southwest and to the Hradec Králové and Pardubice regions in the east. A large part of the territory overlaps with the informally defined region of Polabí. The axis of the territory is the Elbe River, into which a number of other important rivers flow: Vltava, Jizera, Doubrava, Cidlina, Mrlina, Výrovka and Klejnárka.

Suitable natural conditions contributed to the creation of many settlements in the Central Elbe Table. In addition to the fact that the northern suburbs of Prague are located here, the most populous towns in the territory are Kolín, Mělník, Brandýs nad Labem-Stará Boleslav, Kralupy nad Vltavou, Neratovice, Nymburk, Poděbrady, Čelákovice, Čáslav, Lysá nad Labem and Český Brod. Partly located in the Central Elbe Table are Kutná Hora and Milovice.

== Vegetation ==
The landscape has predominantly an agricultural character and is relatively sparsely forested.

== Gallery ==
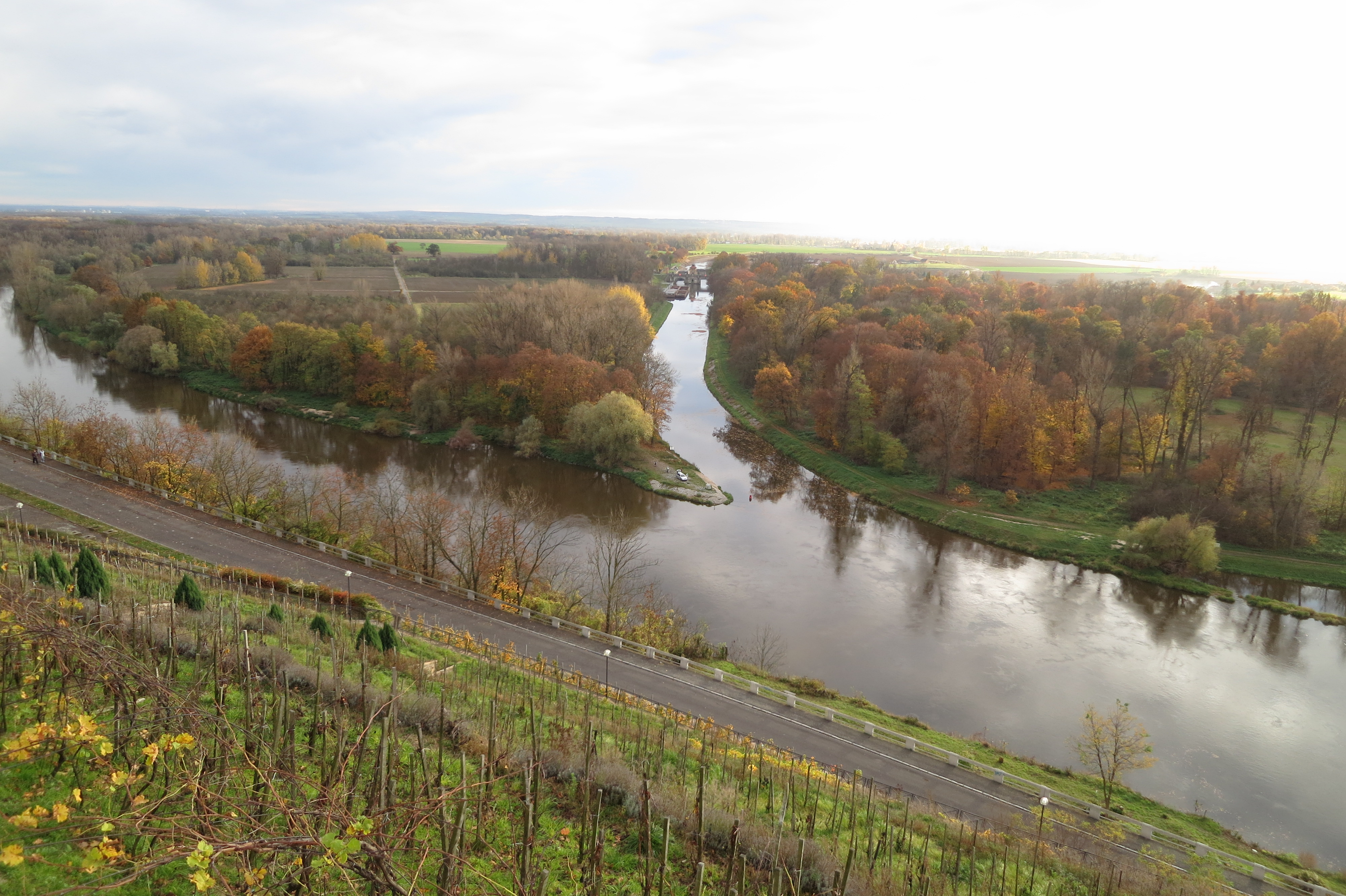
Confluence of the Elbe with a channel of the Vltava

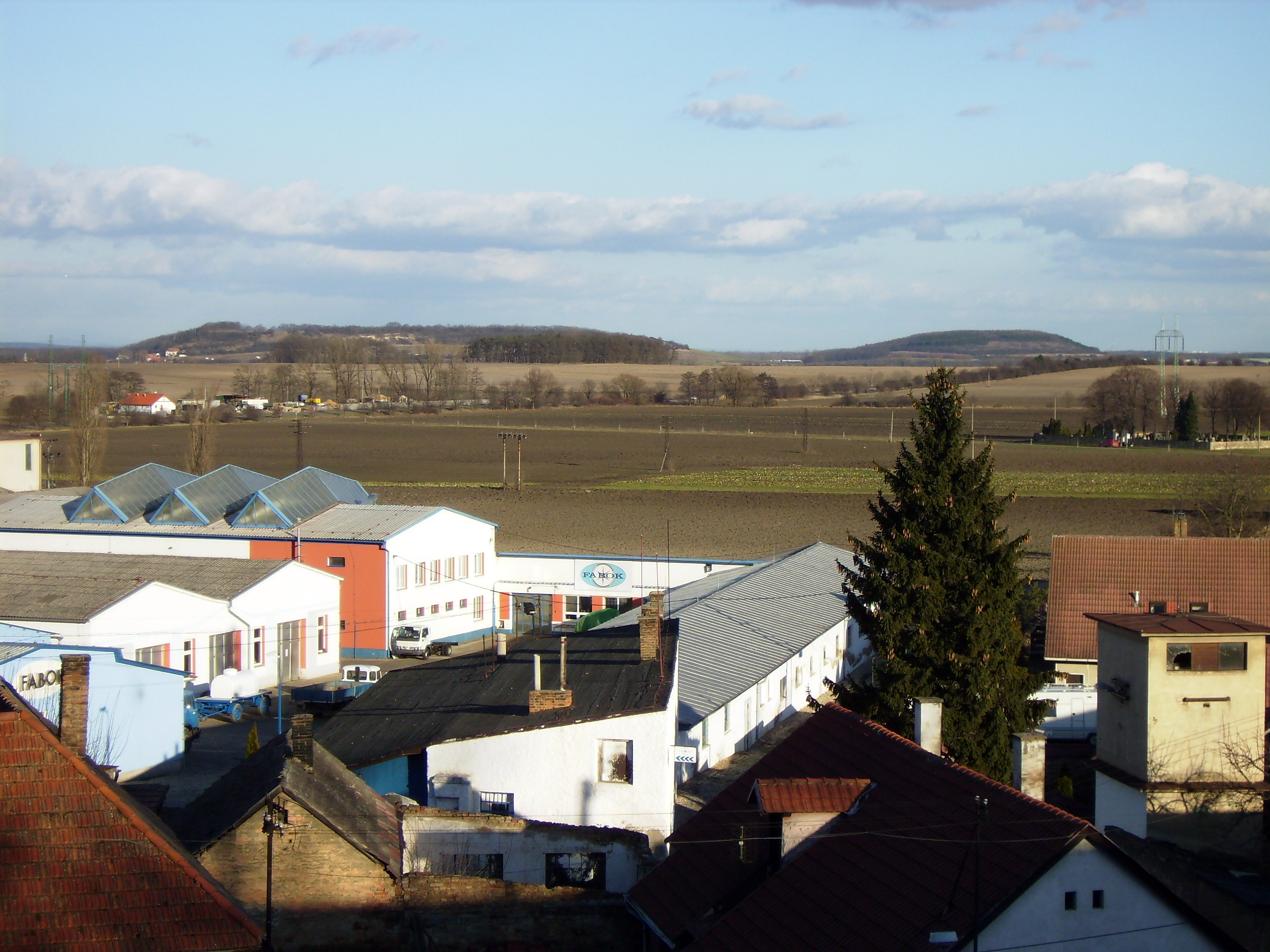
The hills Přerovská hůra and Semická hůra

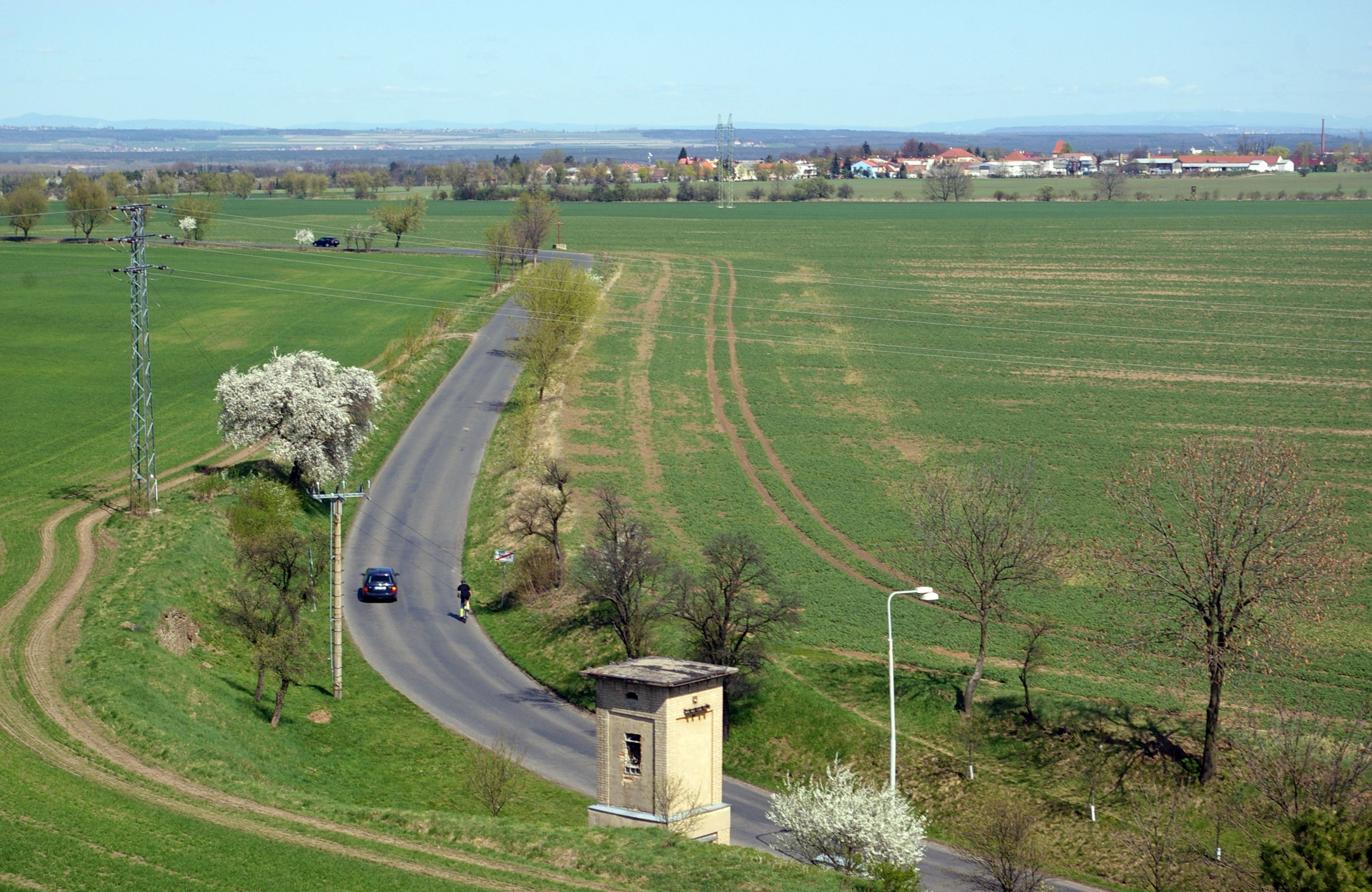
View from Jenštejn to the north

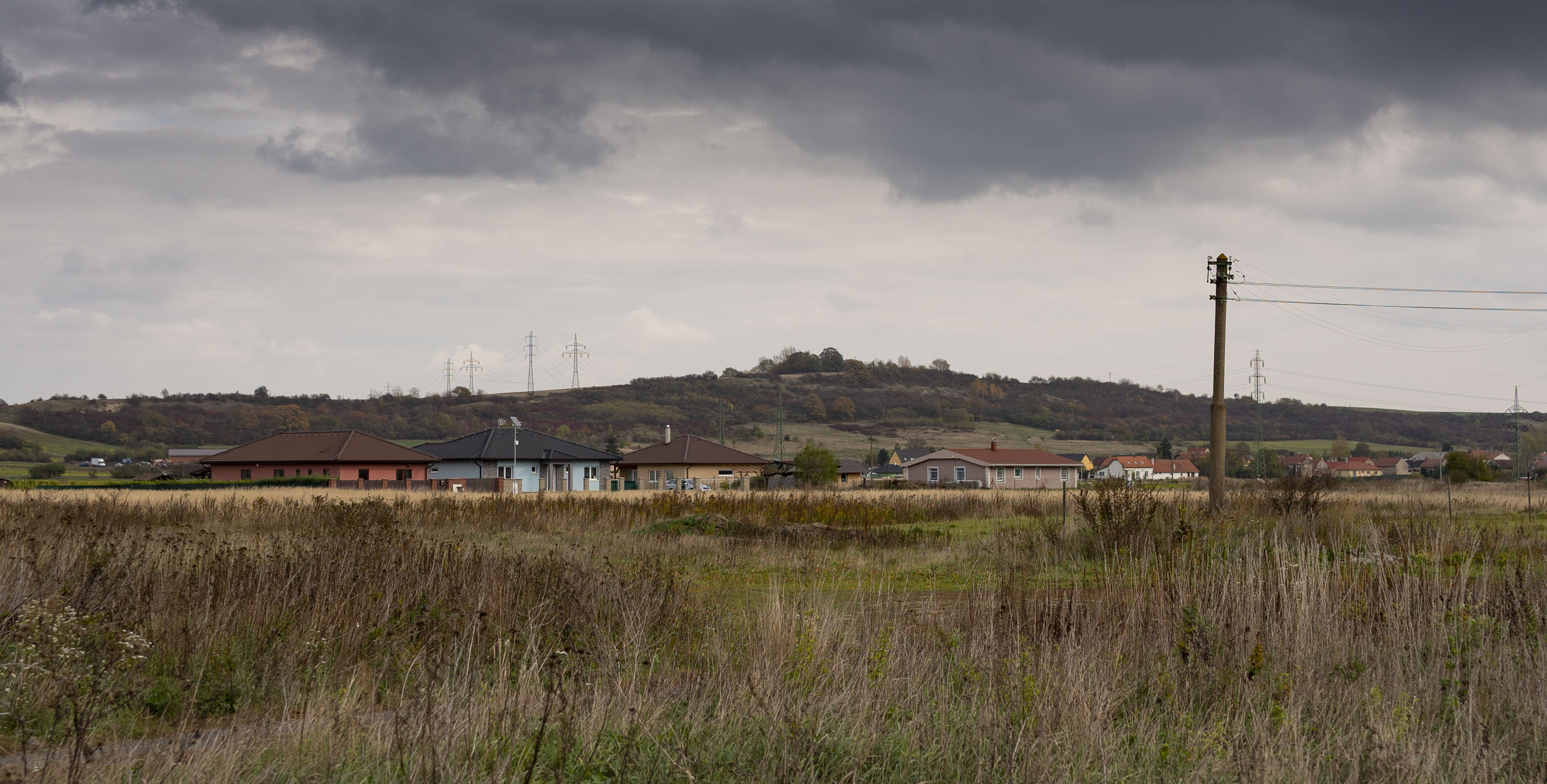
View towards the hill Záboří
