= Vtelno =

Vtelno may refer to places in the Czech Republic:

- Jizerní Vtelno, a municipality and village in the Central Bohemian Region
- Mělnické Vtelno, a municipality and village in the Central Bohemian Region
- Vtelno, a village and part of Most
