= Třebešice =

Třebešice may refer to places in the Czech Republic:

- Třebešice (Benešov District), a municipality and village
- Třebešice (Kutná Hora District), a municipality and village
