= Stránov =

Coordinates: 50°22′22″N 14°51′22″E

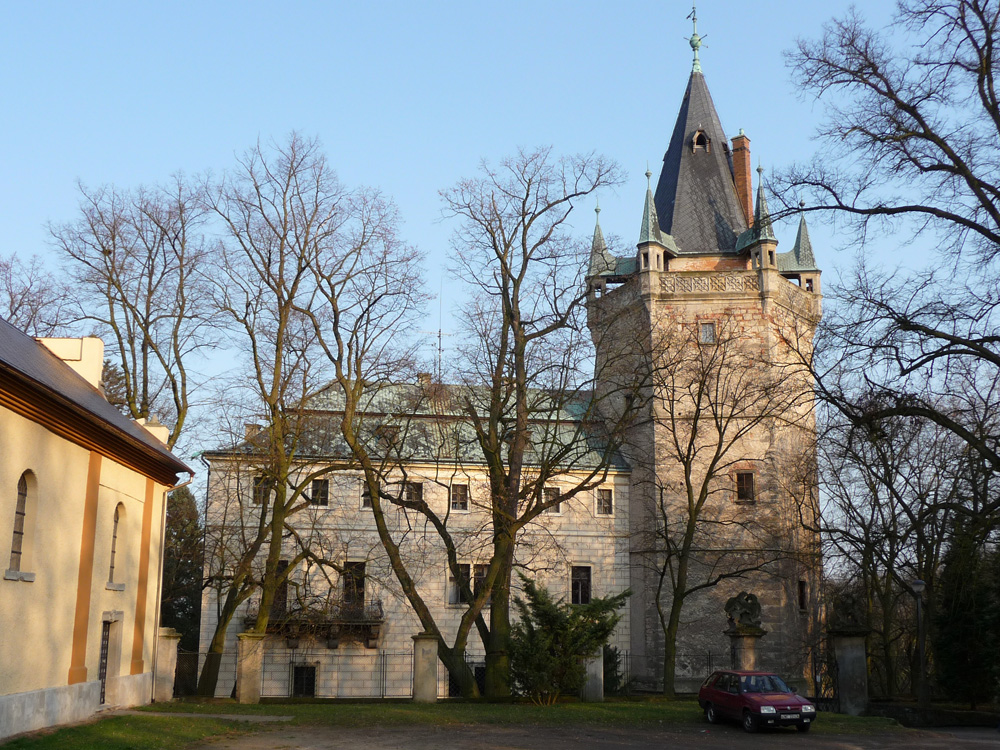
Front view

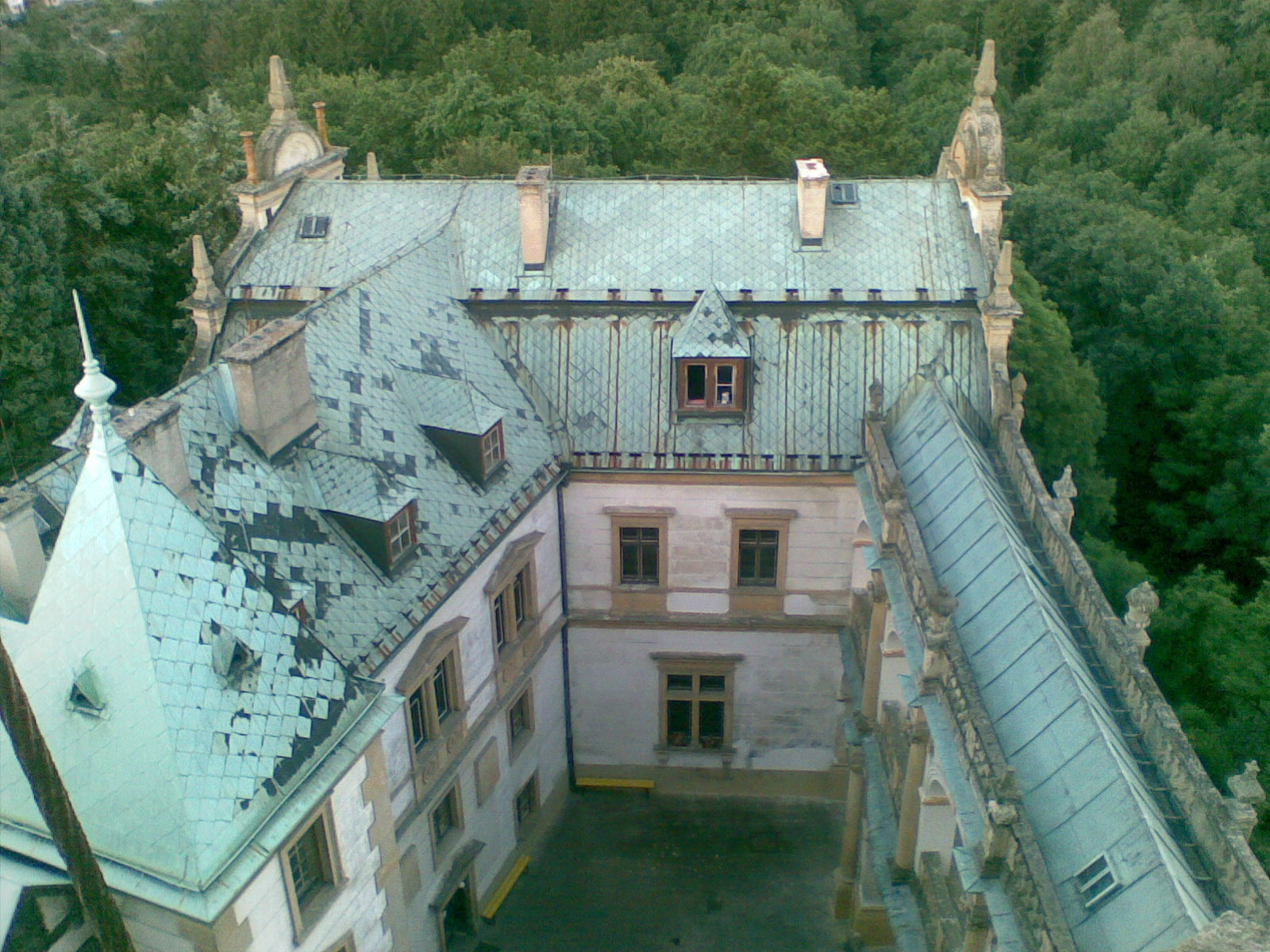
Courtyard

Stránov is castle in Jizerní Vtelno in the Central Bohemian Region of the Czech Republic. The original Middle Ages castle was reconstructed by Joseph Schulz to the Neo-Renaissance look it has today.

== History ==
In place of the present castle originally stood a wooden fortress, which is noted in 1429 by lord Bohuněk of Stránov. A solid Gothic castle Nový Stránov ('new Stránov') was built on its site by Jaroš of Sovojovice in 1463–1468.

From 1545 to 1589 the castle was owned by the Berka of Dubá family. In 1589, Karel of Bieberstein, the Imperial Council and the highest mint master Kingdom of Bohemia, acquired the castle. Later the castle belonged to Michael Slavata from Chlum. During the rule of the family Bieberstein or Slavata, the castle was rebuilt in the Renaissance style.

Around 1642, the owner became the nobleman Jan of Lisov. Later Jan's son, Rudolf Adam of Lisov, lived in the castle with his wife Elizabeth Lidmila and she spent many years of her life in the castle.

In 1746, the ruler of the castle become by marriage Jan Václav Příchovský of Příchovice. This knight from the leading aristocratic family left around the castle manny visible traces – Stránov was rebuilt in the Baroque style, the castle garden was added (which has since disappeared), sandstone Baroque fountain was built in the castle courtyard and in 1767 Church of Saint Wenceslaus in front of the castle. From 1794, it was owned by free lord Jan Herites, and after his death Václav Vojtěch Herites, and until 1864 Knight Bedřich Neubauer.

Present romantic appearance was made during the Neo-Renaissance reconstruction in the late nineteenth century, which was performed in 1890–1894 on project designed by Joseph Schulz builder J. Mráz on order of Countess Marie of Waldstein-Wartenberg.

In 1917 the castle was bought by the Škoda Works President and Senator in Parliament Josef Šimonek, who was for a contribution to the development of industry promoted to the baron status. His son František Šimonek and his family lived on Stránov until castle was nationalised in 1950. After the nationalization of the castle was used as a children's home (in front of the castle was located Common Agricultural cooperation), which led to a corresponding all non-sensitive adjustments (toilets and washing facilities were built into the main corridors and state rooms, etc.).

Since 2003, the castle is back in the hands of the Šimonek family. In 2004, after partial reconstruction of the interiors and exteriors of the castle, the castle was opened to the public for the first time in its history. In summer, the castle hosts many cultural events.
