= Mělnické Vtelno =

- Municipality
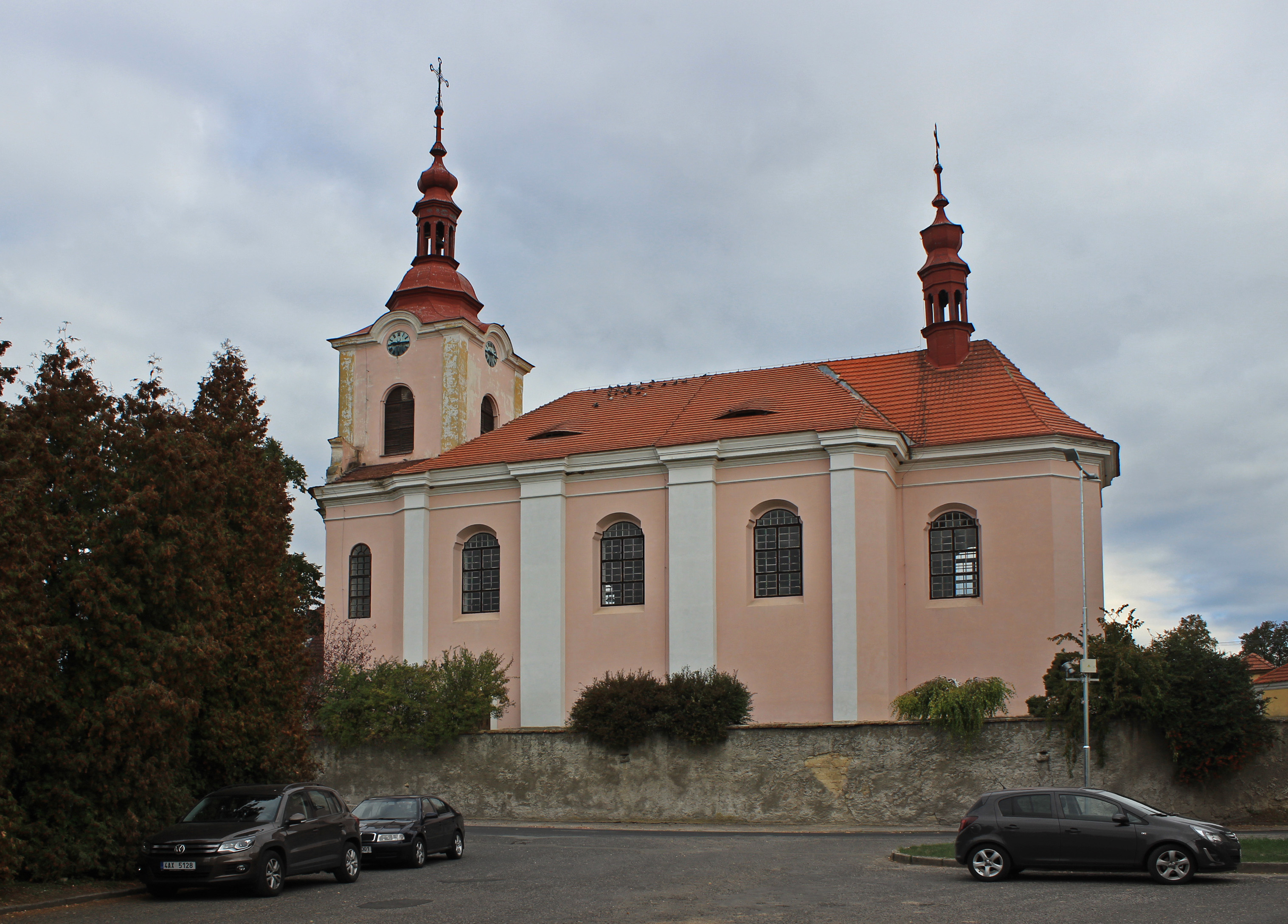
- Church of Saint Michael

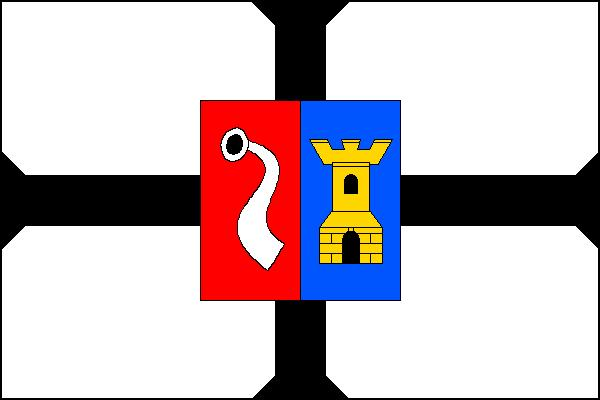
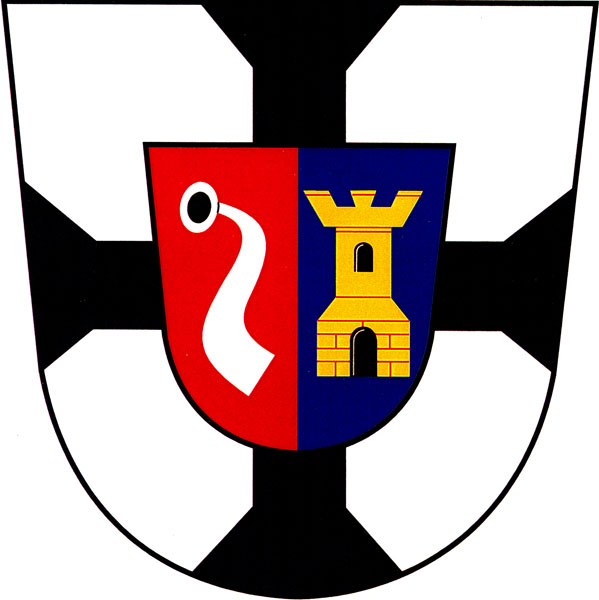
- Flag Coat of arms

- Location in the Czech Republic
- Coordinates: 50°21′9″N 14°41′43″E
- Country: Czech Republic
- Region: Central Bohemian
- District: Mělník
- First mentioned: 1352

Area
  - Total: 26.30 km^{2} (10.15 sq mi)
- Elevation: 269 m (883 ft)

Population (2026-01-01)
  - Total: 1,012
  - Density: 38.48/km^{2} (99.66/sq mi)
- Time zone: UTC+1 (CET)
  - Summer (DST): UTC+2 (CEST)
- Postal code: 277 38
- Website: www.melnickevtelno.cz

Mělnické Vtelno is a municipality and village in Mělník District in the Central Bohemian Region of the Czech Republic. It has about 1,000 inhabitants.

== Administrative division ==
Mělnické Vtelno consists of three municipal parts (in brackets population according to the 2021 census):

- Mělnické Vtelno (593)
- Radouň (134)
- Vysoká Libeň (274)

== Demographics ==
Historical population
Year	Pop.	±%
1869	1,370	—
1880	1,740	+27.0%
1890	1,742	+0.1%
1900	1,753	+0.6%
1910	1,819	+3.8%
1921	1,736	−4.6%
1930	1,765	+1.7%
1950	1,216	−31.1%
1961	1,074	−11.7%
1970	1,000	−6.9%
1980	891	−10.9%
1991	840	−5.7%
2001	837	−0.4%
2011	936	+11.8%
2021	1,001	+6.9%
Source: Censuses
