= Třebešice (Kutná Hora District) =

- Municipality
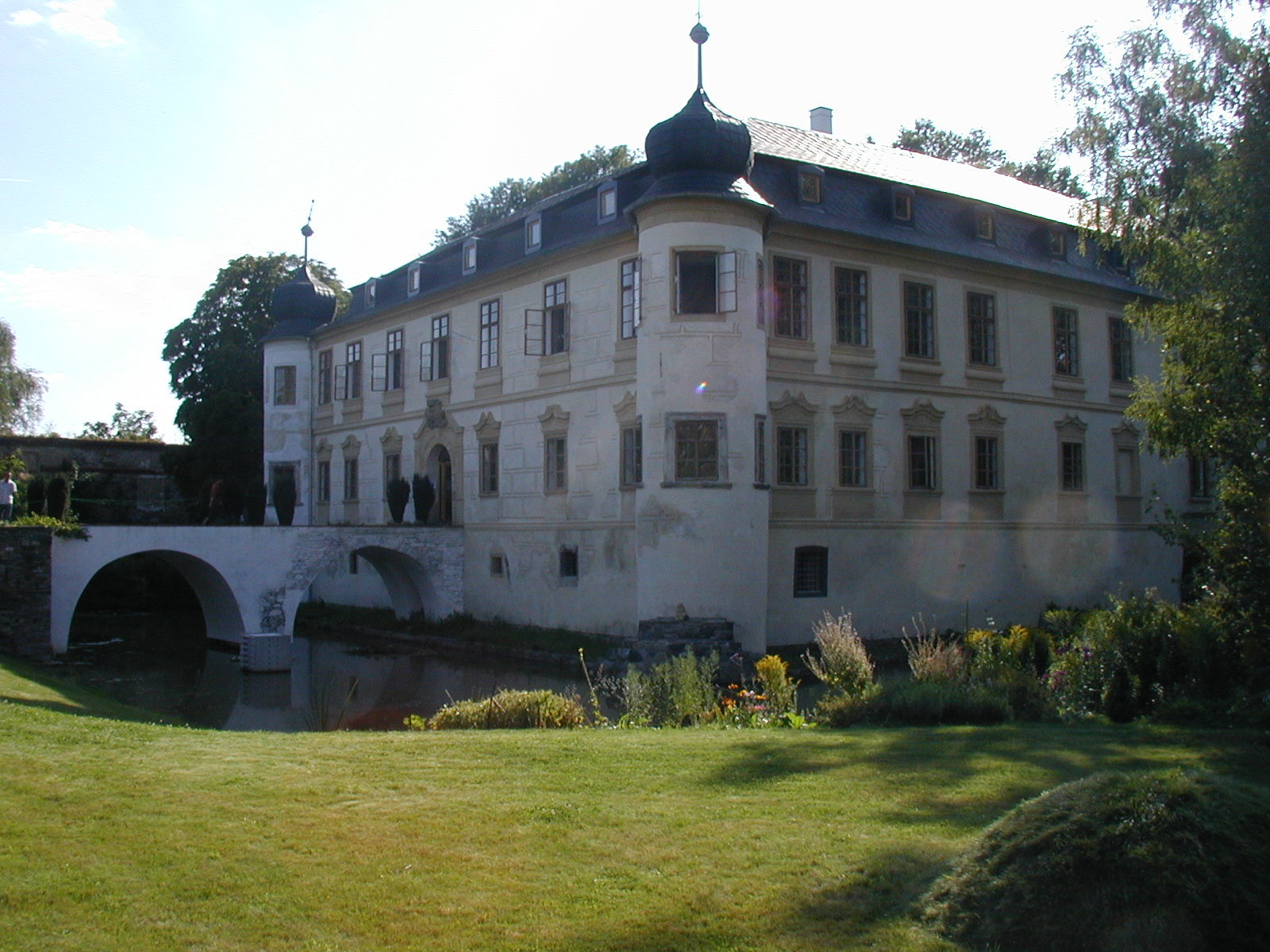
- Třebešice Castle

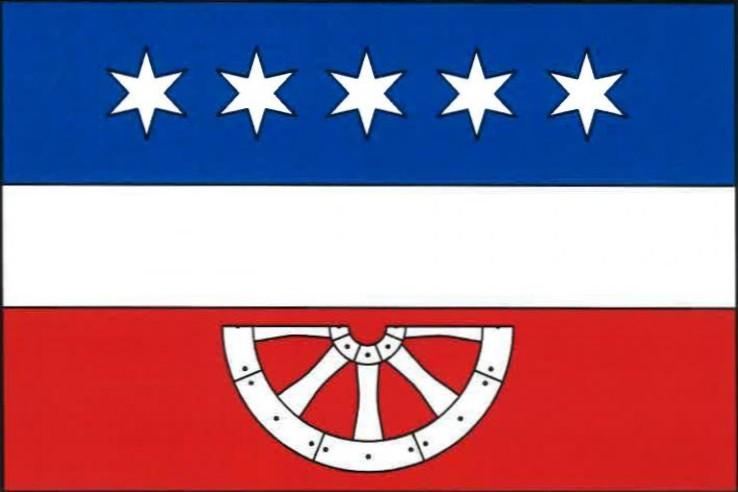
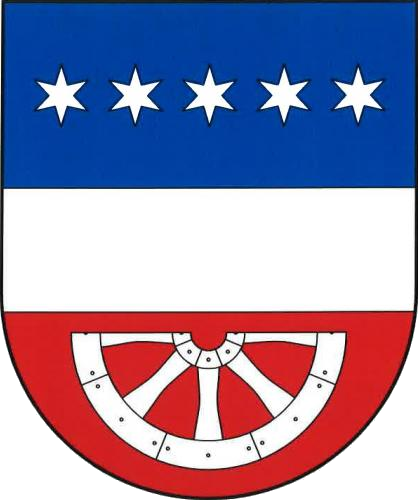
- Flag Coat of arms

- Location in the Czech Republic
- Coordinates: 49°55′40″N 15°20′16″E
- Country: Czech Republic
- Region: Central Bohemian
- District: Kutná Hora
- First mentioned: 1309

Area
  - Total: 7.21 km^{2} (2.78 sq mi)
- Elevation: 225 m (738 ft)

Population (2026-01-01)
  - Total: 324
  - Density: 44.9/km^{2} (116/sq mi)
- Time zone: UTC+1 (CET)
  - Summer (DST): UTC+2 (CEST)
- Postal code: 286 01
- Website: www.trebesice.cz

Třebešice is a municipality and village in Kutná Hora District in the Central Bohemian Region of the Czech Republic. It has about 300 inhabitants.

== Demographics ==
Historical population
Year	Pop.	±%
1869	610	—
1880	737	+20.8%
1890	731	−0.8%
1900	674	−7.8%
1910	626	−7.1%
1921	513	−18.1%
1930	572	+11.5%
1950	374	−34.6%
1961	381	+1.9%
1970	239	−37.3%
1980	216	−9.6%
1991	195	−9.7%
2001	219	+12.3%
2011	253	+15.5%
2021	282	+11.5%
Source: Censuses

== Sights ==
Třebešice is known for the Třebešice Castle.
