= Jizerní Vtelno =

- Municipality
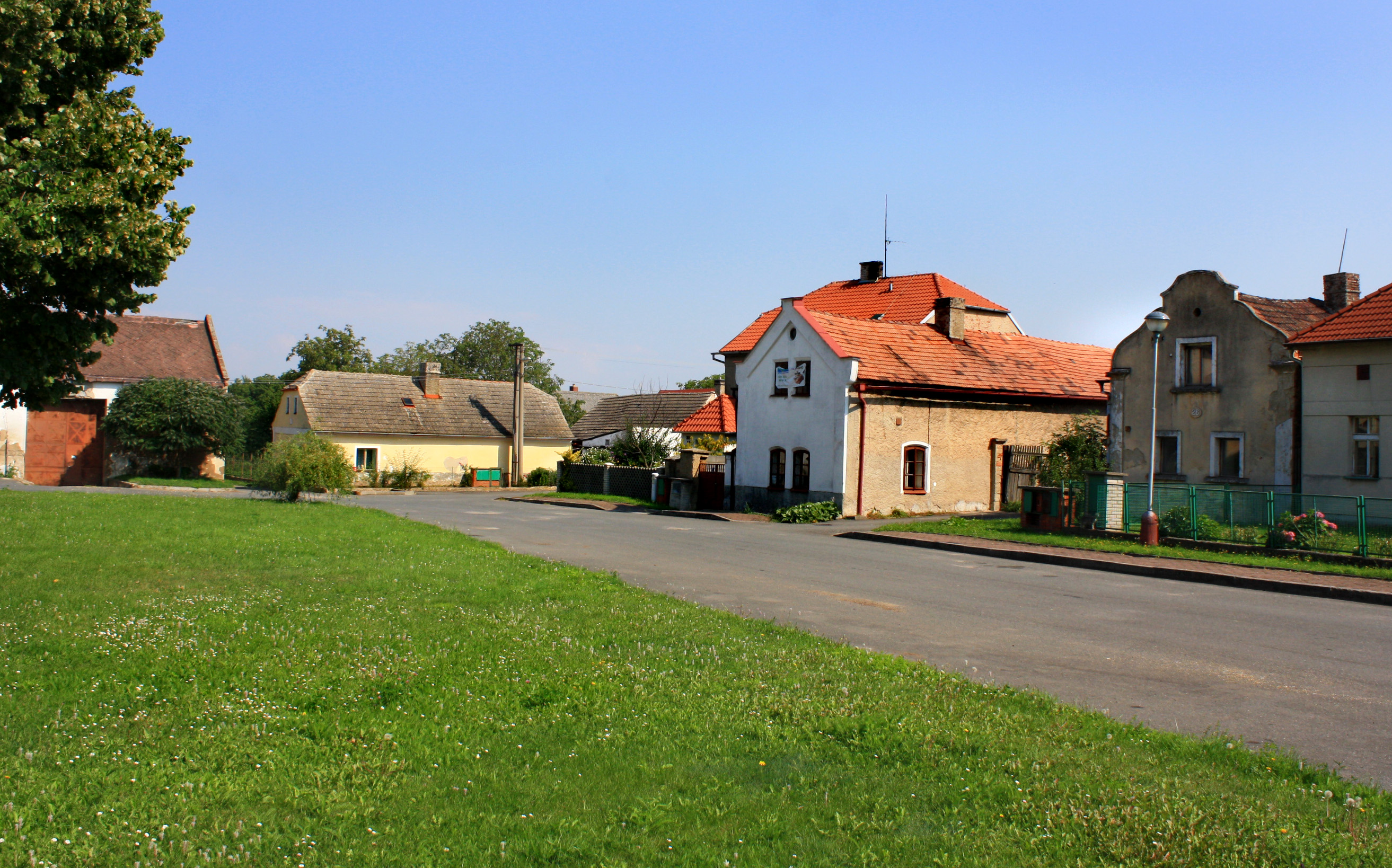
- Centre of Jizerní Vtelno

- Flag Coat of arms

- Location in the Czech Republic
- Coordinates: 50°22′10″N 14°51′12″E
- Country: Czech Republic
- Region: Central Bohemian
- District: Mladá Boleslav
- First mentioned: 1229

Area
  - Total: 6.96 km^{2} (2.69 sq mi)
- Elevation: 257 m (843 ft)

Population (2026-01-01)
  - Total: 366
  - Density: 52.6/km^{2} (136/sq mi)
- Time zone: UTC+1 (CET)
  - Summer (DST): UTC+2 (CEST)
- Postal code: 294 31
- Website: www.jizernivtelno.cz

Jizerní Vtelno is a municipality and village in Mladá Boleslav District in the Central Bohemian Region of the Czech Republic. It has about 400 inhabitants.

== Etymology ==
The name Vtelno is derived from vetla, which is an old Slavic word for 'willow'.

== Geography ==
Jizerní Vtelno is located about 6 kilometres (4 mi) southwest of Mladá Boleslav and 38 km (24 mi) northeast of Prague. It lies in the Jizera Table. The municipality is situated on the right bank of the Jizera River, which forms the eastern municipal border.

== History ==
The first written mention of Jizerní Vtelno is from 1229. It belonged to the Stránov estate that was controlled from the castle adjacent to the village. Among the most notable owners of the estate were the Berka of Dubá family, the Bieberstein family, and the Slavata of Chlum family, who had the local castle rebuilt in the first half of the 17th century.

== Demographics ==
Historical population

Year	Pop.	±%
1869	571	—
1880	601	+5.3%
1890	621	+3.3%
1900	660	+6.3%
1910	632	−4.2%

Year	Pop.	±%
1921	690	+9.2%
1930	608	−11.9%
1950	520	−14.5%
1961	518	−0.4%
1970	468	−9.7%

Year	Pop.	±%
1980	459	−1.9%
1991	347	−24.4%
2001	308	−11.2%
2011	343	+11.4%
2021	354	+3.2%

Source: Censuses

== Transport ==
The I/16 road, which connects the D10 motorway with Mělník, runs through the municipality.

== Sights ==
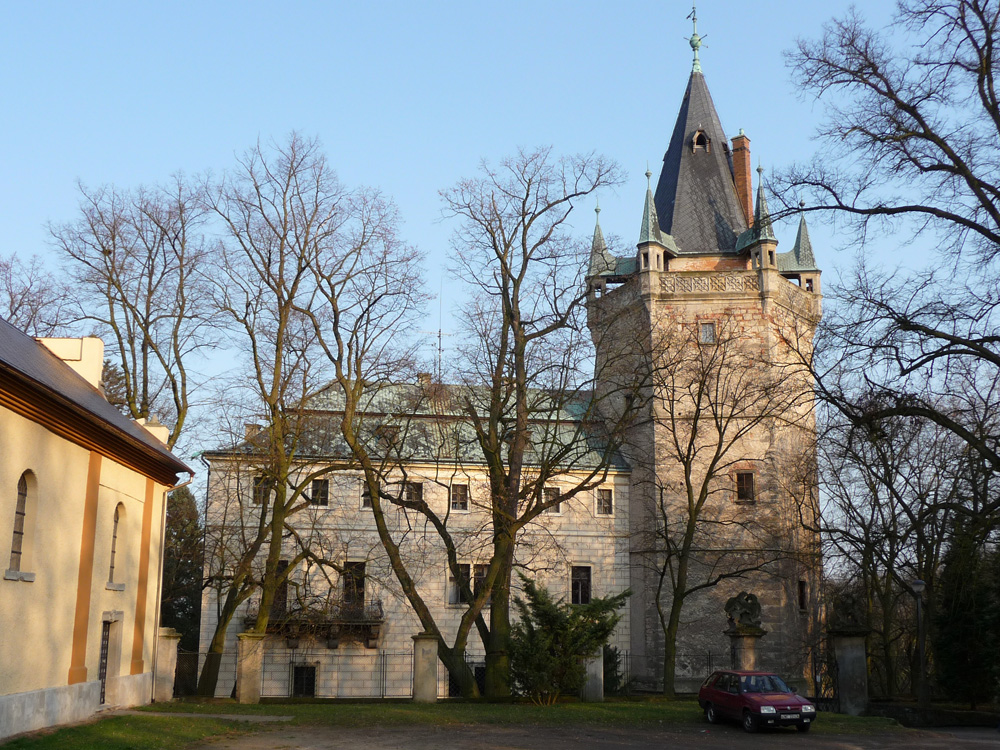
Stránov Castle

Jizerní Vtelno is known for the Stránov castle. A wooden fortress is Jizerní Vtelno was first documented in 1429. In 1463–1468, it was replaced by a Gothic castle, which was later rebuilt into a Renaissance residence. In 1890–1894, it was rebuilt into its current neo-Renaissance form. Today the castle is privately owned and open to the public.

The Church of Saint Wenceslaus was built in the late Baroque style near the castle in 1767. In the 20th century, it fell into disrepair, but the ruin was completely reconstructed in 2003.
