= Třebešice Castle =

Castle in Třebešice, Central Bohemian, Czech Republic

Coordinates: 49.9296°N 15.3388°E

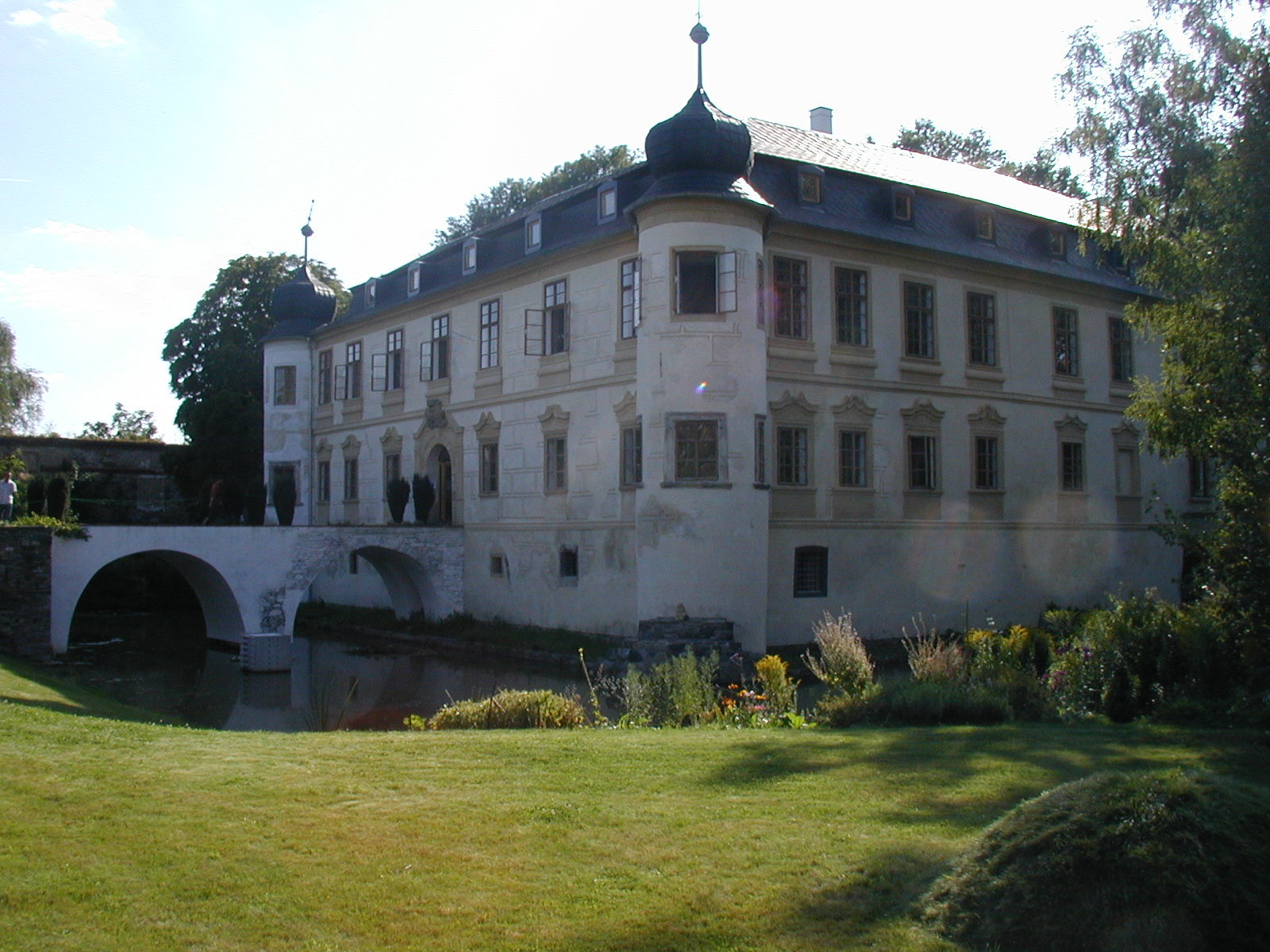
Třebešice Castle

Třebešice Castle is a castle in Třebešice in the Central Bohemian Region of the Czech Republic.

The structure itself dates back to the Gothic times (the first written mention of a water fortress in "Trebesiz" dates back to 1309) but the manor was extensively rebuilt and extended in Renaissance times, with further changes done in the Baroque era. It fell into ruins after World War II. It was restored by the Italians Eugenio Percossi and Alberto di Stefano in 2015 and can be rented for events and films as well bed and breakfast.

The layout of the castle is horseshoe-shaped, surrounded by a water moat.
