= Central Bohemian Region =

Region of the Czech Republic

Central Bohemia Region Středočeský kraj
- Region
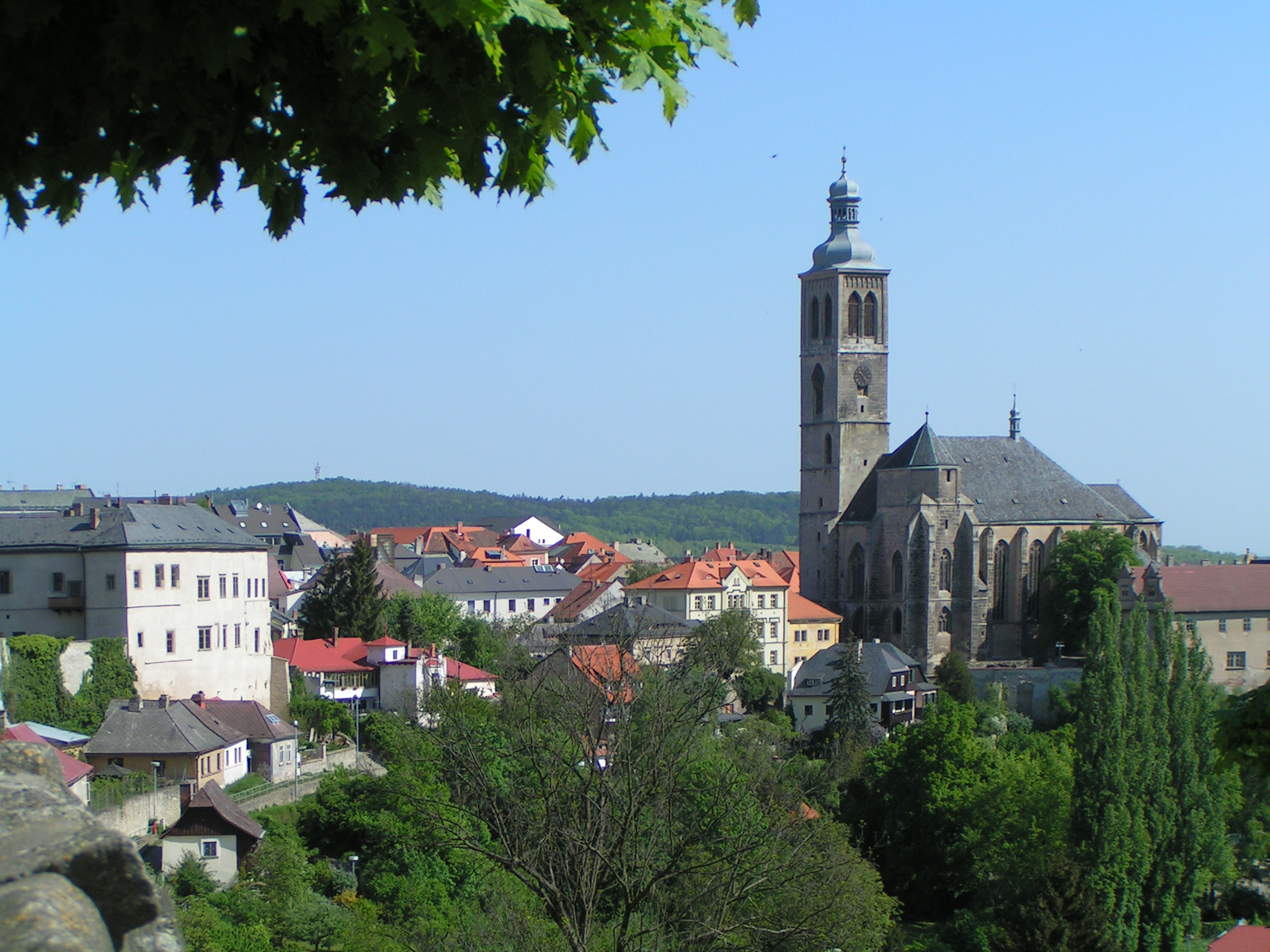
- Cityscape of Kutná Hora with St. James church

- Flag Coat of arms

- Coordinates: 50°0′N 14°32′E
- Country: Czech Republic
- Capital: Prague (administrative only)
- Districts: Benešov District, Beroun District, Kladno District, Kolín District, Kutná Hora District, Mělník District, Mladá Boleslav District, Nymburk District, Prague-East District, Prague-West District, Příbram District, Rakovník District

Government
  - Governor: Petra Pecková (STAN)

Area
  - Total: 11,014.97 km^{2} (4,252.90 sq mi)
- Highest elevation: 865 m (2,838 ft)

Population (2024-01-01)
  - Total: 1,455,940
  - Density: 132.178/km^{2} (342.340/sq mi)

GDP
  - Total: €39.719 billion (2024)
  - Per capita: €27,093 (2024)
- ISO 3166 code: CZ-20
- Vehicle registration: S
- Website: www.kr-stredocesky.cz

The Central Bohemian Region (Czech: Středočeský kraj [ˈstr̝̊ɛdotʃɛskiː ˈkraj]; German: Mittelböhmische Region) is an administrative unit (kraj) of the Czech Republic, located in the central part of its historical region of Bohemia. Its administrative centre is in the Czech capital Prague, which lies in the centre of the region. However, the city is not part of it but is a region of its own. Its largest city by population is Kladno.

The Central Bohemian Region is in the centre of Bohemia. In terms of area, it is the largest region in the Czech Republic, with 11,014 km^{2}, almost 14% of the total area of the country. It surrounds the country's capital, Prague, and borders Liberec Region (in the north), Hradec Králové Region (northeast), Pardubice Region (east), Vysočina Region (southeast), South Bohemian Region (south), Plzeň Region (west) and Ústí nad Labem Region (northwest).

== Geography ==
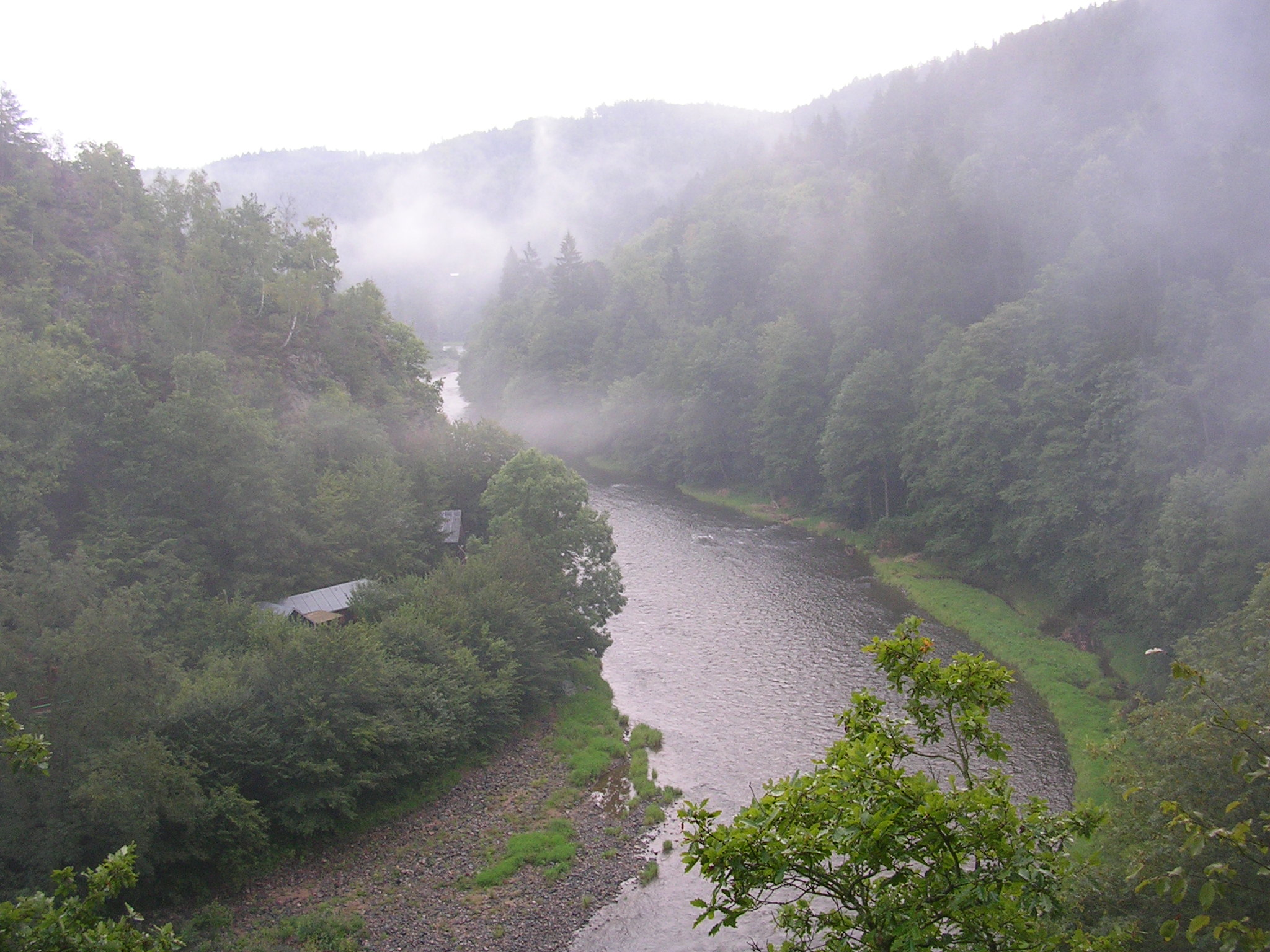
The Sázava River at the Kliment's View

With an area of 11,014 km^{2}, the Central Bohemian Region is the largest region of the Czech Republic, occupying 14% of its total area. The region has relatively diversified terrain. The highest point of the region is located on Tok hill (865 m) in Brdy Highlands in the southwestern part of the region. The lowest point of the region is situated on the water surface of the Elbe River (Czech: Labe) near Dolní Beřkovice.

The region is divided into two landscape types. The northeastern part is formed by the Polabí lowlands with a high share of land being used for agricultural purposes and deciduous forests. The south-western part of the region is hilly with coniferous and mixed forests.

Important rivers in the region are Labe, Vltava, Berounka, Jizera and Sázava. On the Vltava river, a series of nine dams (Czech: Vltavská kaskáda) was constructed throughout the 20th century.

The agricultural land accounts for 83.5% of all land in the region, which 11p.p. more than the national average. The highest share of the agricultural land can be found in Polabí, especially in Kolín and Nymburk districts.

There are a number of landscape parks located in the region. Křivoklátsko is the largest and most important landscape park in the region, being at the same time a UNESCO Biosphere Reservation. Another remarkable area is the Bohemian Karst, the largest karst area in the Czech republic, where the Koněprusy Caves (Czech: Koněpruské jeskyně) are located. Finally, a large part of Kokořínsko Landscape Park is situated in the Central Bohemian Region.

=== Administrative divisions ===
The Central Bohemian Region is divided into 12 districts:

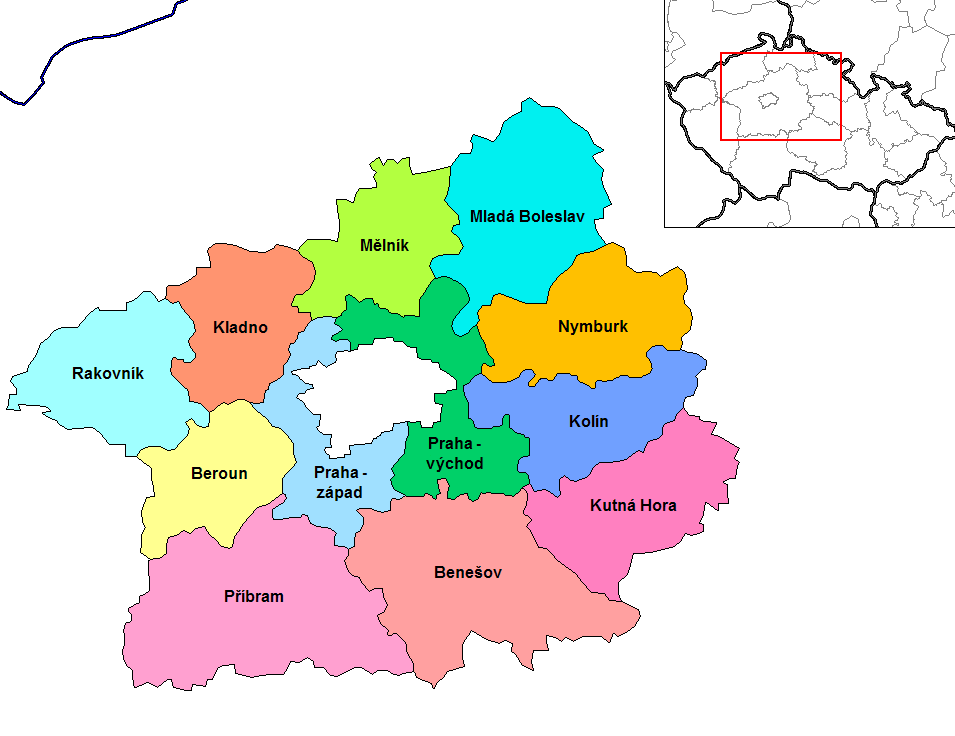
Districts of the Central Bohemian Region

Benešov
Beroun
Kladno
Kolín
Kutná Hora
Mělník

Mladá Boleslav
Nymburk
Praha-Východ (Prague-East)
Praha-Západ (Prague-West)
Příbram
Rakovník

Příbram District is the region's largest district in terms of area (15% of the total region's area), while Prague-West District is the smallest one (5%). In 2019, the region counted in total 1,144 municipalities, of which 26 were municipalities with a delegated municipal office; 1,028 municipalities had fewer than 2,000 inhabitants and they accounted for 41% of the total population of the region. Eighty-two municipalities had a status of town.

== Population ==
As of January 1, 2024 the Central Bohemian Region had 1,455,940 inhabitants and was the most populous region in the country. About 53% of the inhabitants lived in towns or cities. This is the lowest proportion among the regions of the Czech Republic.

Since the second half of the 1990s the areas surrounding Prague have been significantly influenced by suburbanization. High numbers of young people have moved to the region and since 2006 the region has been experiencing a natural population growth. As of 2024, the average age in the region is 41.5 years, the lowest number among the regions in the Czech Republic.

The table shows cities and towns in the region that had more than 10,000 inhabitants (as of January 1, 2024):

Name	Population	Area (km^{2})	District
Kladno	69,078	37	Kladno District
Mladá Boleslav	46,428	29	Mladá Boleslav District
Kolín	33,229	35	Kolín District
Příbram	32,992	33	Příbram District
Kutná Hora	21,556	33	Kutná Hora District
Beroun	21,272	31	Beroun District
Mělník	20,350	25	Mělník District
Brandýs nad Labem-Stará Boleslav	20,073	23	Prague-East District
Kralupy nad Vltavou	18,782	22	Mělník District
Benešov	17,035	47	Benešov District
Říčany	16,955	26	Prague-East District
Slaný	16,740	35	Kladno District
Neratovice	16,217	20	Mělník District
Rakovník	15,739	19	Rakovník District
Nymburk	15,510	21	Nymburk District
Poděbrady	15,156	34	Nymburk District
Milovice	13,920	31	Nymburk District
Čelákovice	12,463	16	Prague-East District
Vlašim	11,455	41	Benešov District
Čáslav	10,512	26	Kutná Hora District
Jesenice	10,483	17	Prague-West District

Historical population

Year	Pop.	±%
1869	976,994	—
1880	1,051,948	+7.7%
1890	1,093,158	+3.9%
1900	1,142,018	+4.5%
1910	1,192,034	+4.4%

Year	Pop.	±%
1921	1,176,949	−1.3%
1930	1,223,719	+4.0%
1950	1,085,079	−11.3%
1961	1,142,244	+5.3%
1970	1,129,546	−1.1%

Year	Pop.	±%
1980	1,151,265	+1.9%
1991	1,112,882	−3.3%
2001	1,122,441	+0.9%
2011	1,289,192	+14.9%
2021	1,415,463	+9.8%

Source: Censuses

== Economy ==
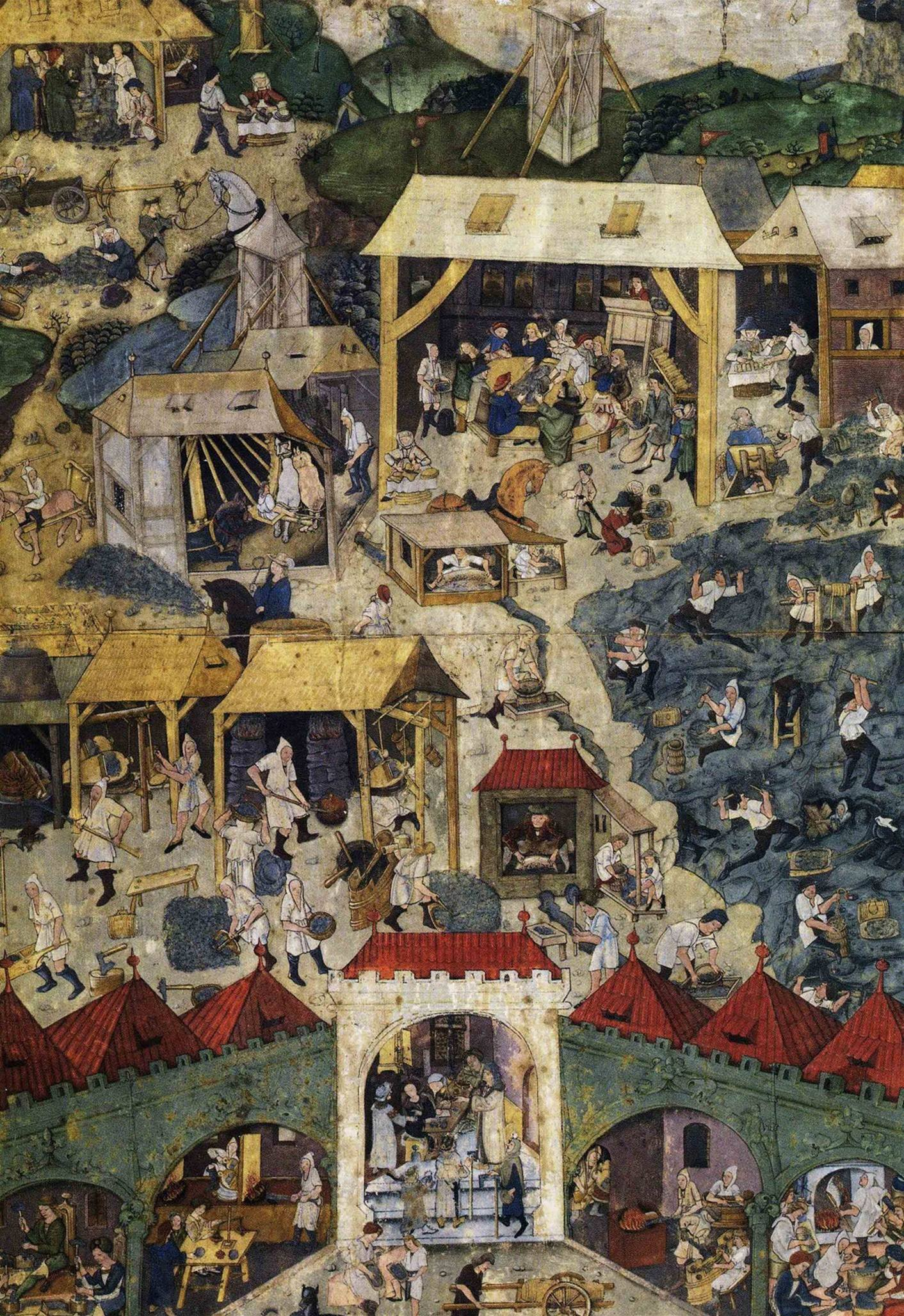
Silver mining in Kutná Hora in the 15th century

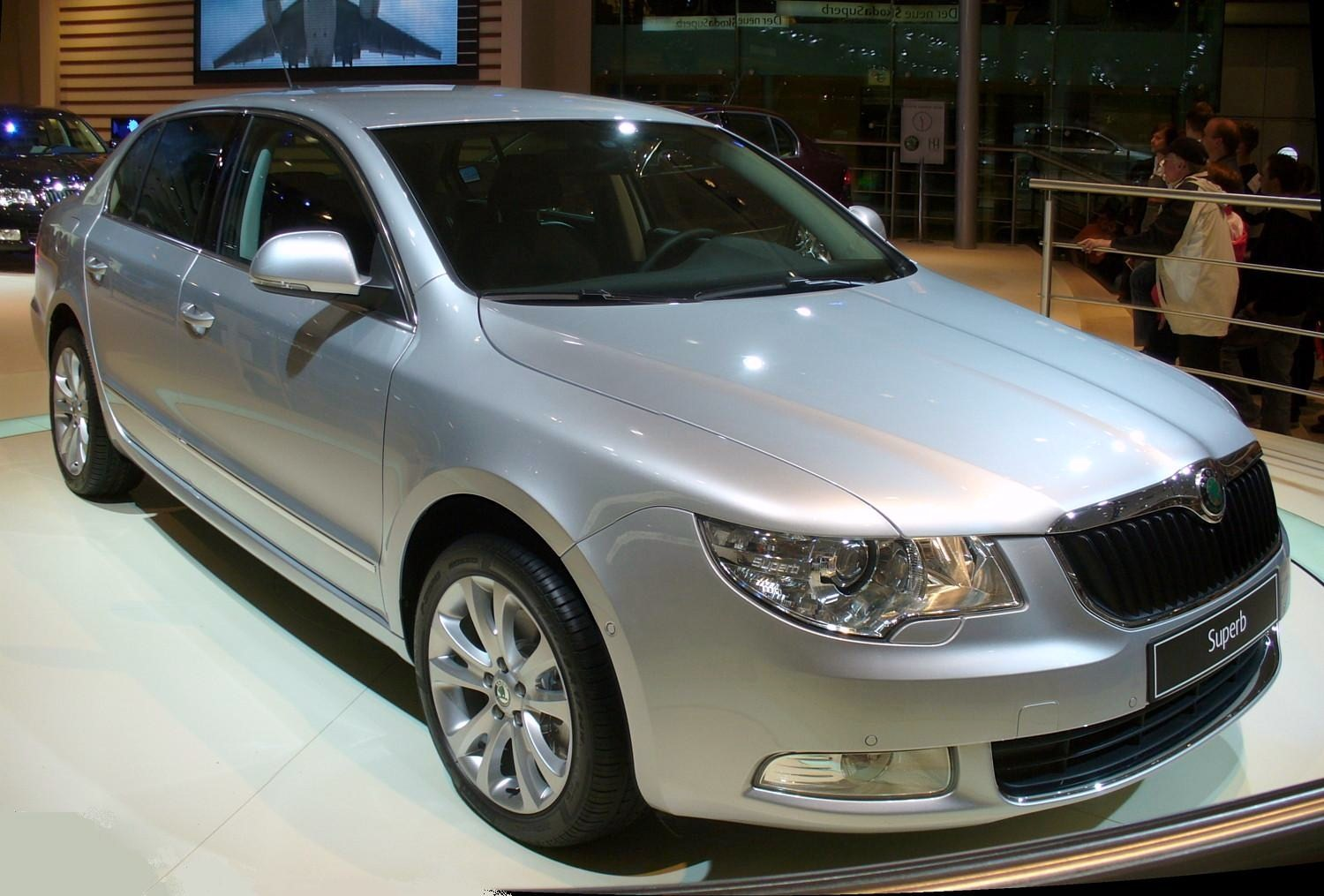
Škoda Superb produced in Mladá Boleslav

The gross domestic product (GDP) of the region was 24.1 billion € in 2018, accounting for 11.6% of Czech economic output. GDP per capita adjusted for purchasing power was 25,300 € or 82% of the EU27 average in the same year. The GDP per employee was 84% of the EU average, which makes Central Bohemia one of the wealthiest regions in the Czech Republic. Six out of ten employees in the region work in the tertiary sector and the share of this sector on the total employment has been increasing over time. On the other hand, the share of primary and secondary sector has been decreasing. The unemployment rate in the region is in the long-term lower than the national average. As of December 31, 2012 the registered unemployment rate was 7.07%. However, there were considerable differences in the unemployment rate within the region. The lowest unemployment rate was in Prague-East District (3.35%) while the highest in Příbram District (10.10%). The average wage in the region in 2012 was CZK 24,749 (approximately EUR 965).

=== Industry ===
The most important branches of industry in the region are mechanical engineering, chemical industry and food industry. Other significant industries are glass production, ceramics and printing. On the other hand, some traditional industries such as steel industry, leather manufacturing and coal mining have been declining in the recent period.

In 2006, 237 industrial companies with 100 or more employees were active in the region. A car manufacturer ŠKODA AUTO a.s. Mladá Boleslav became a company of nationwide importance. Another car manufacturer which is active in the region is TPCA Czech, s.r.o. in Kolín.

=== Agriculture ===
The north-eastern part of the region has very favourable conditions for agriculture. The agriculture in the region is oriented especially in crop farming, namely the production of wheat, barley, sugar beet and in suburban areas also fruit farming, vegetable growing and floriculture. Since the beginning of the 1990s the employment in agriculture, forestry and fishing has been decreasing.

=== Transport ===
The region has an advantageous position thanks to its proximity to the capital. A significant proportion of region's population commutes daily to Prague for work or to schools. Compared to other regions, the Central Bohemian region has the densest (and the most overloaded) transport network. The roads and railways connecting the capital with other regions all cross the Central Bohemian region.

== Tourism ==
Central Bohemia official tourist board is based in Husova street 156/21 Prague 1 Old Town. The official website of Central Bohemia is www.centralbohemia.eu (Currently under reconstruction). There are also social pages on.

=== Castles ===
- Karlštejn Castle
- Kokořín Castle
- Konopiště
- Křivoklát Castle
- Lány
- Stranov

== Photo gallery ==
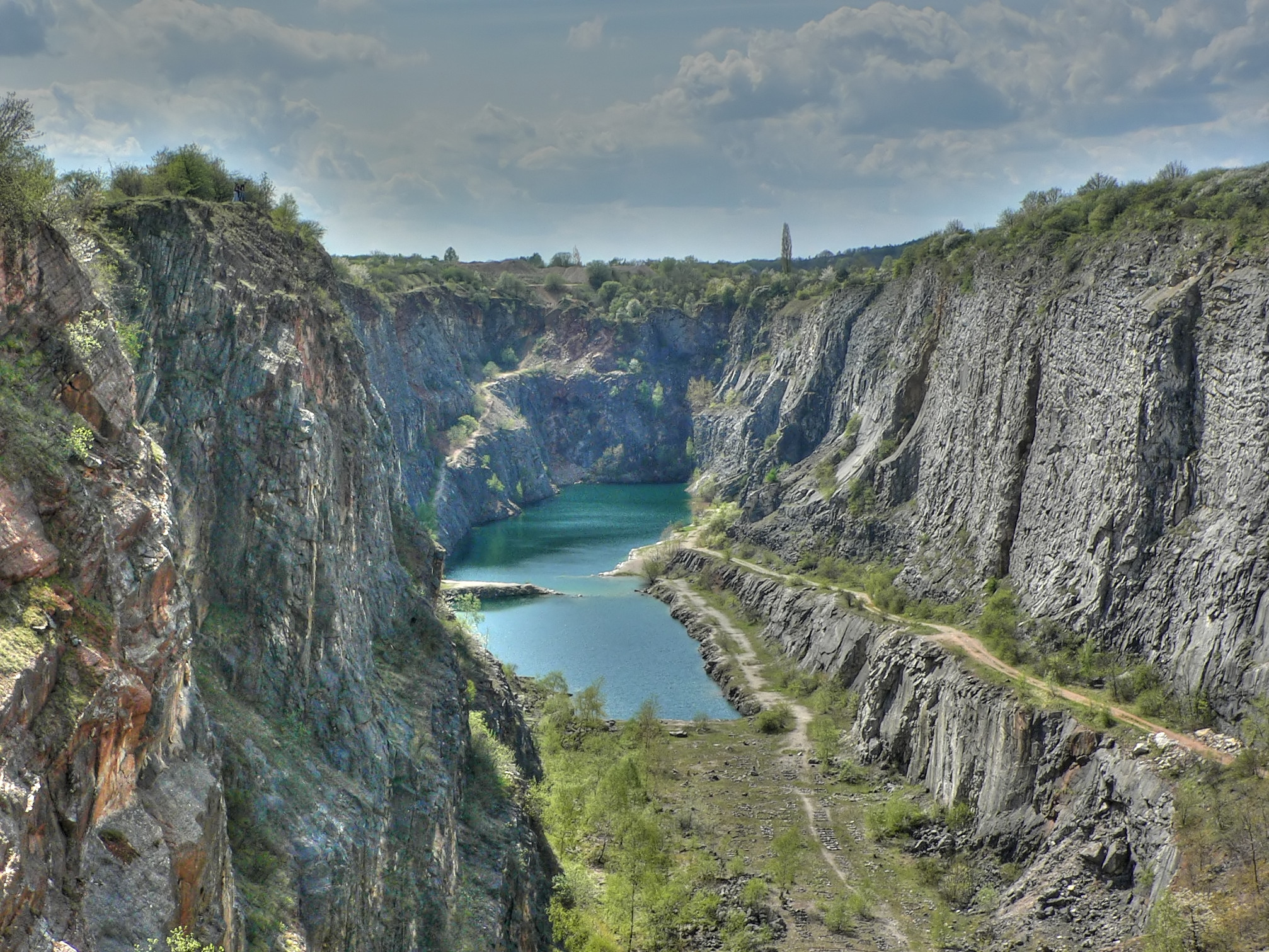
Amerika quarry

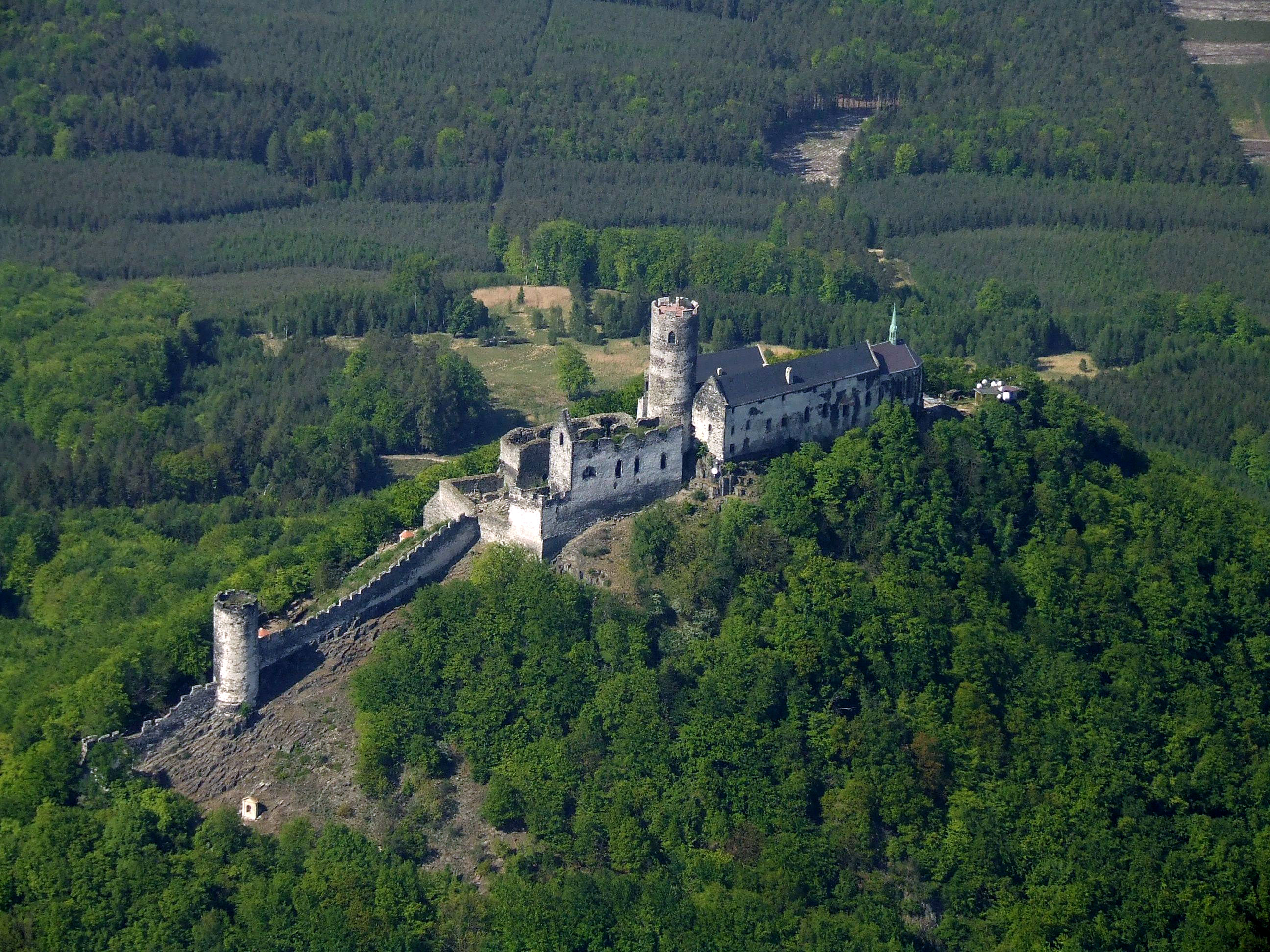
Bezděz Castle

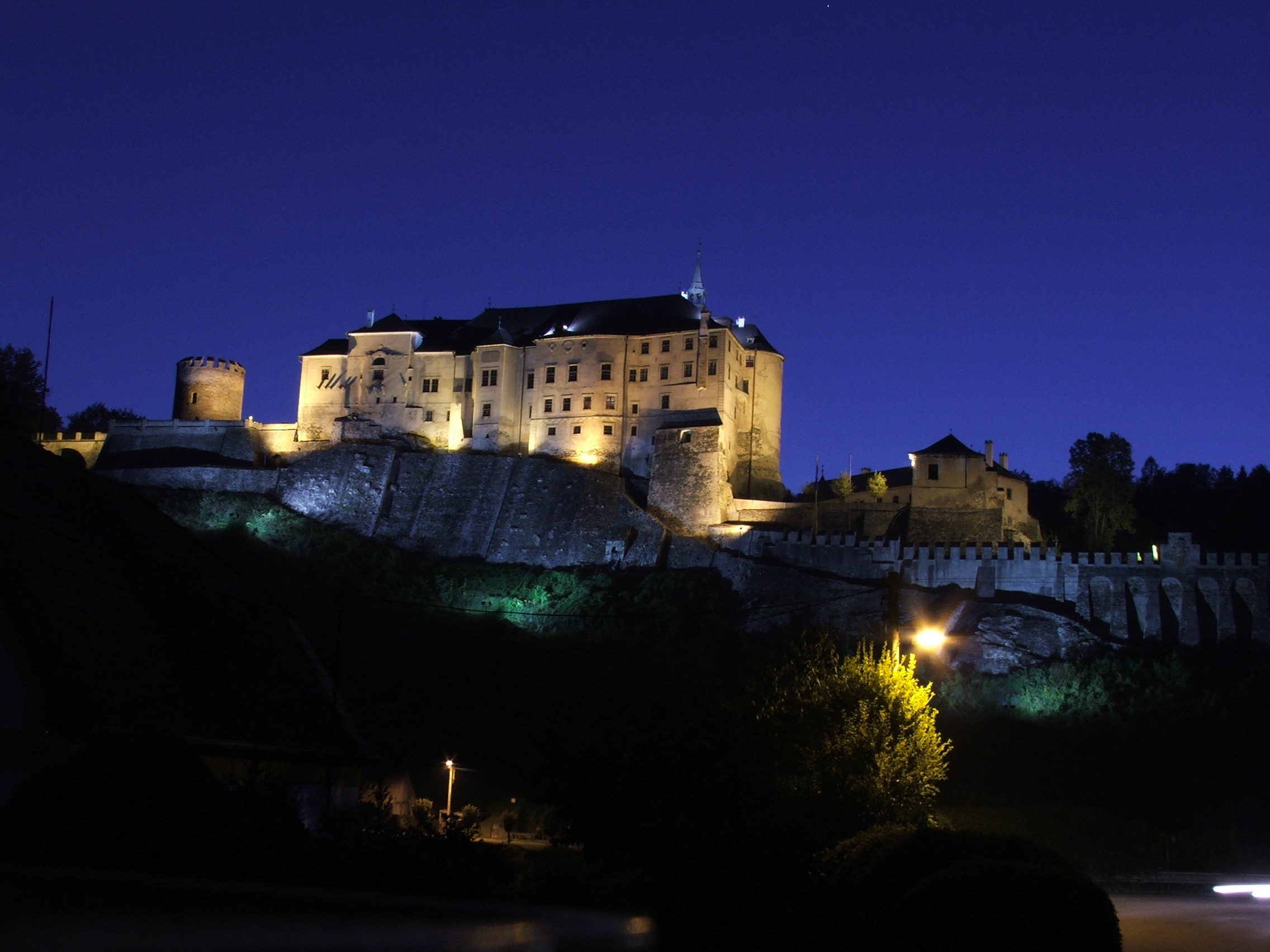
Český Šternberk Castle

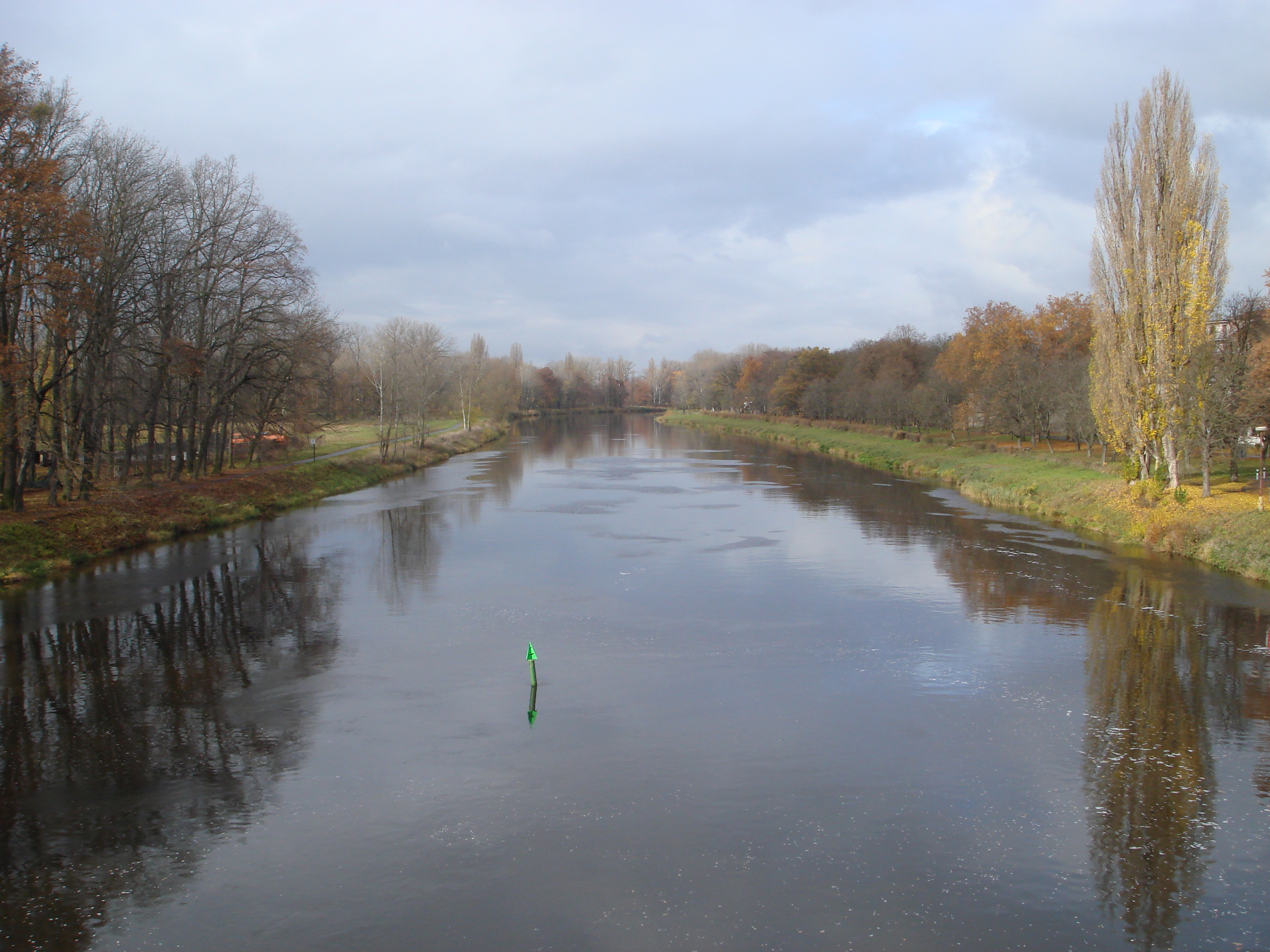
Elbe in Poděbrady

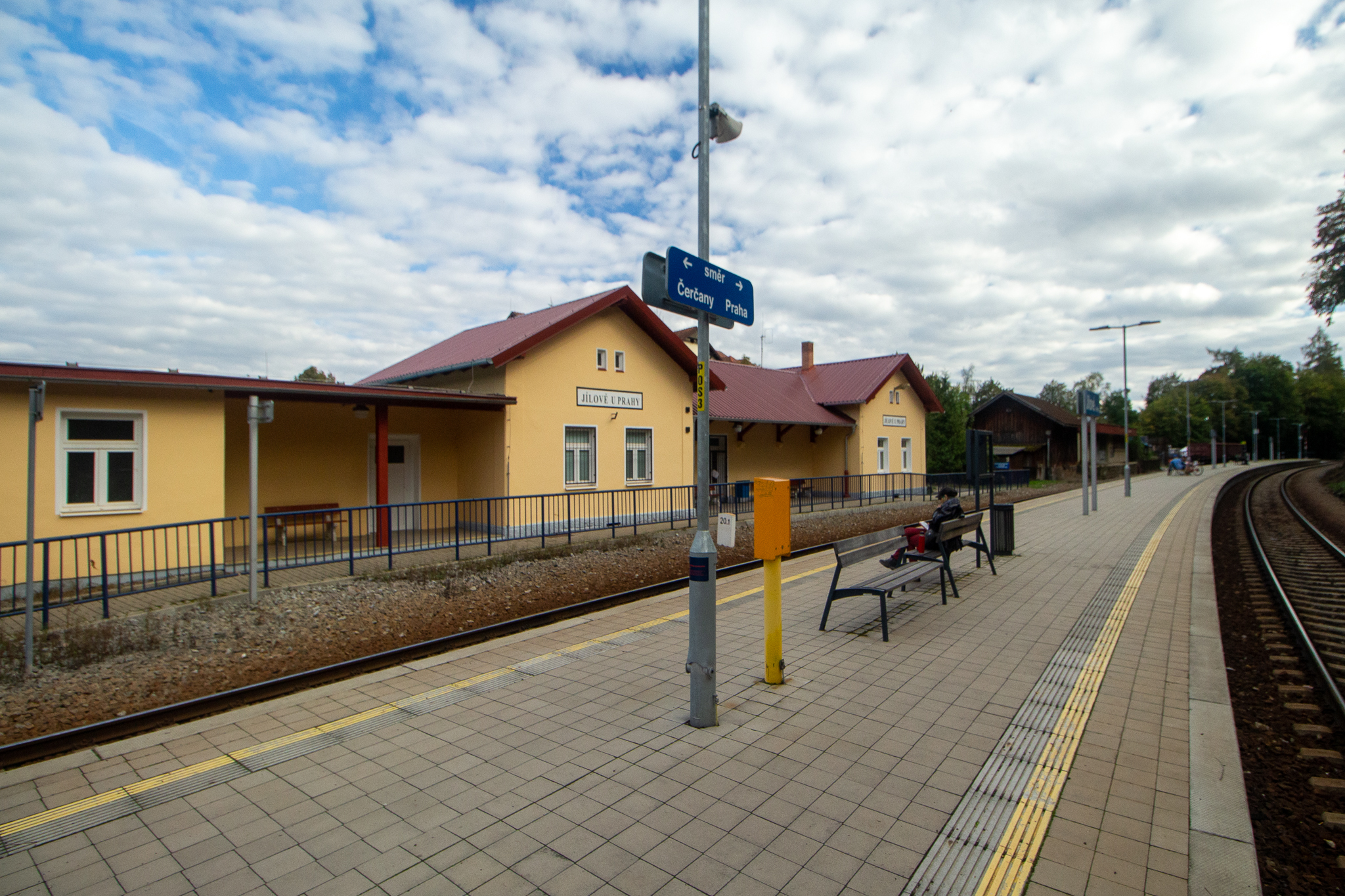
Jílové u Prahy train station

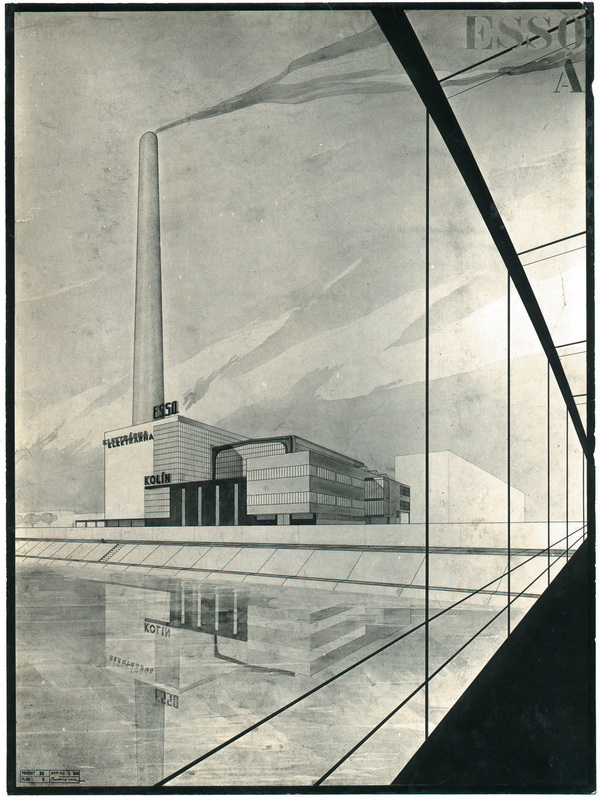
ESSO power plant in Kolín

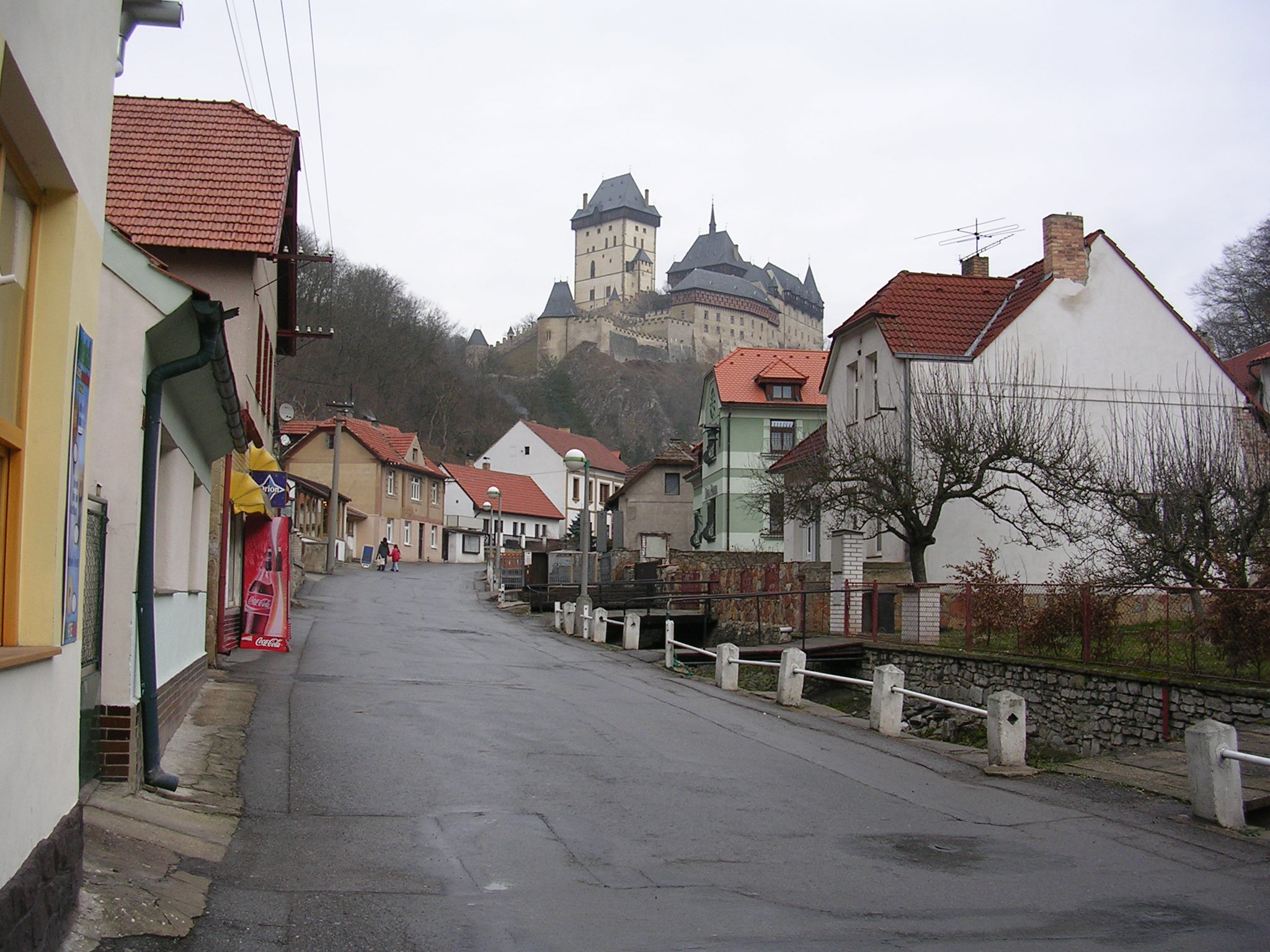
Karlštejn Castle

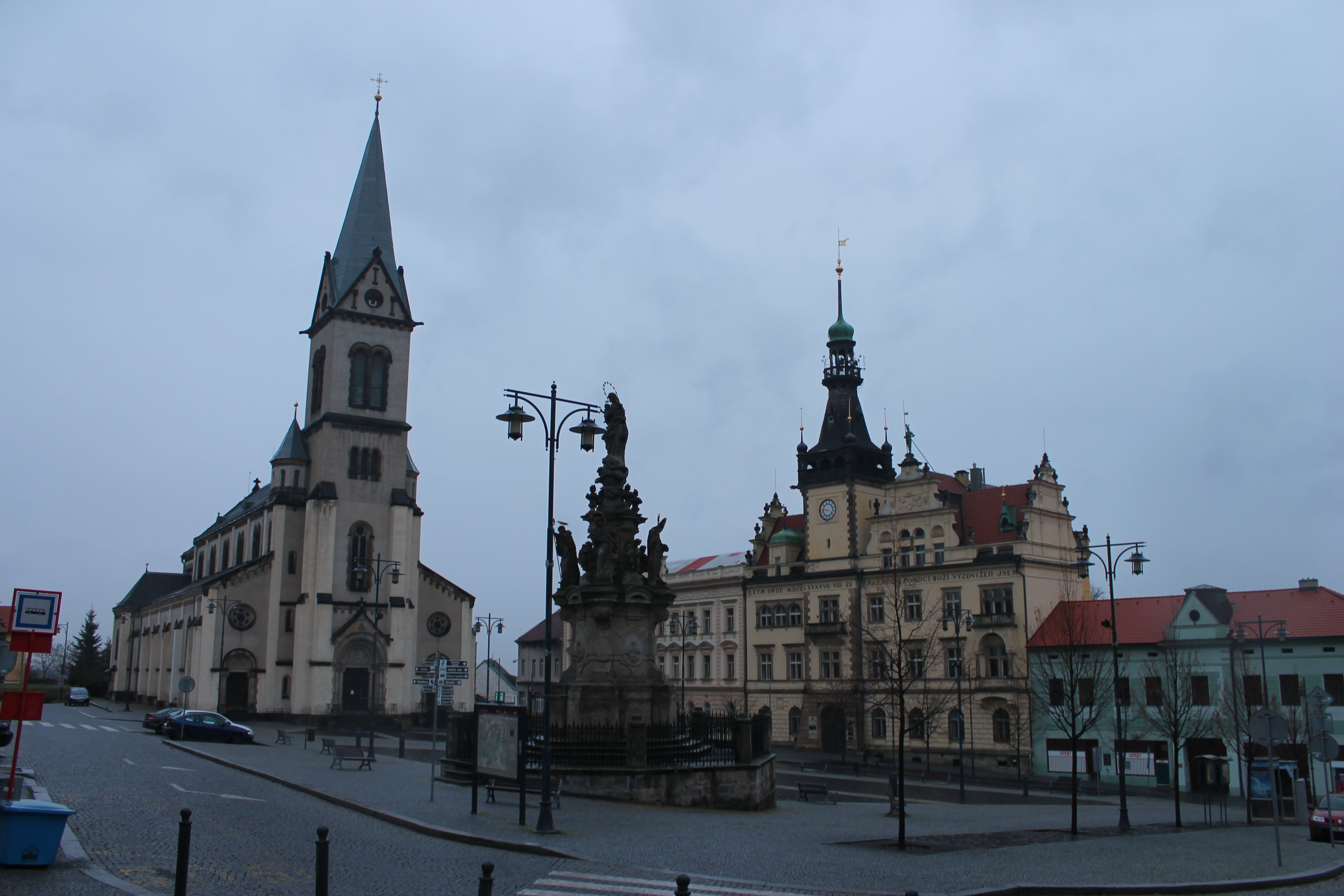
Kladno

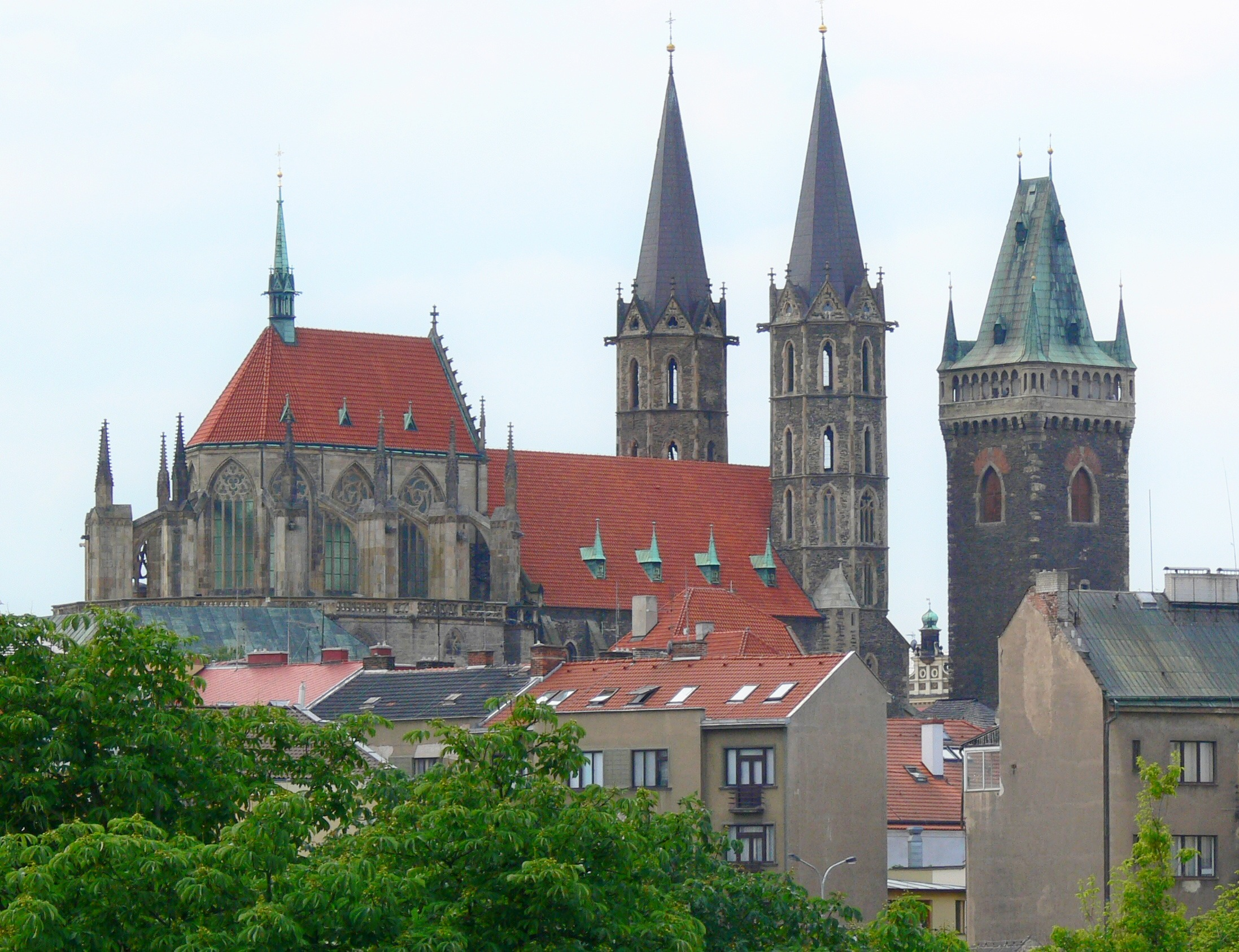
Kolín, St. Bartholomew church

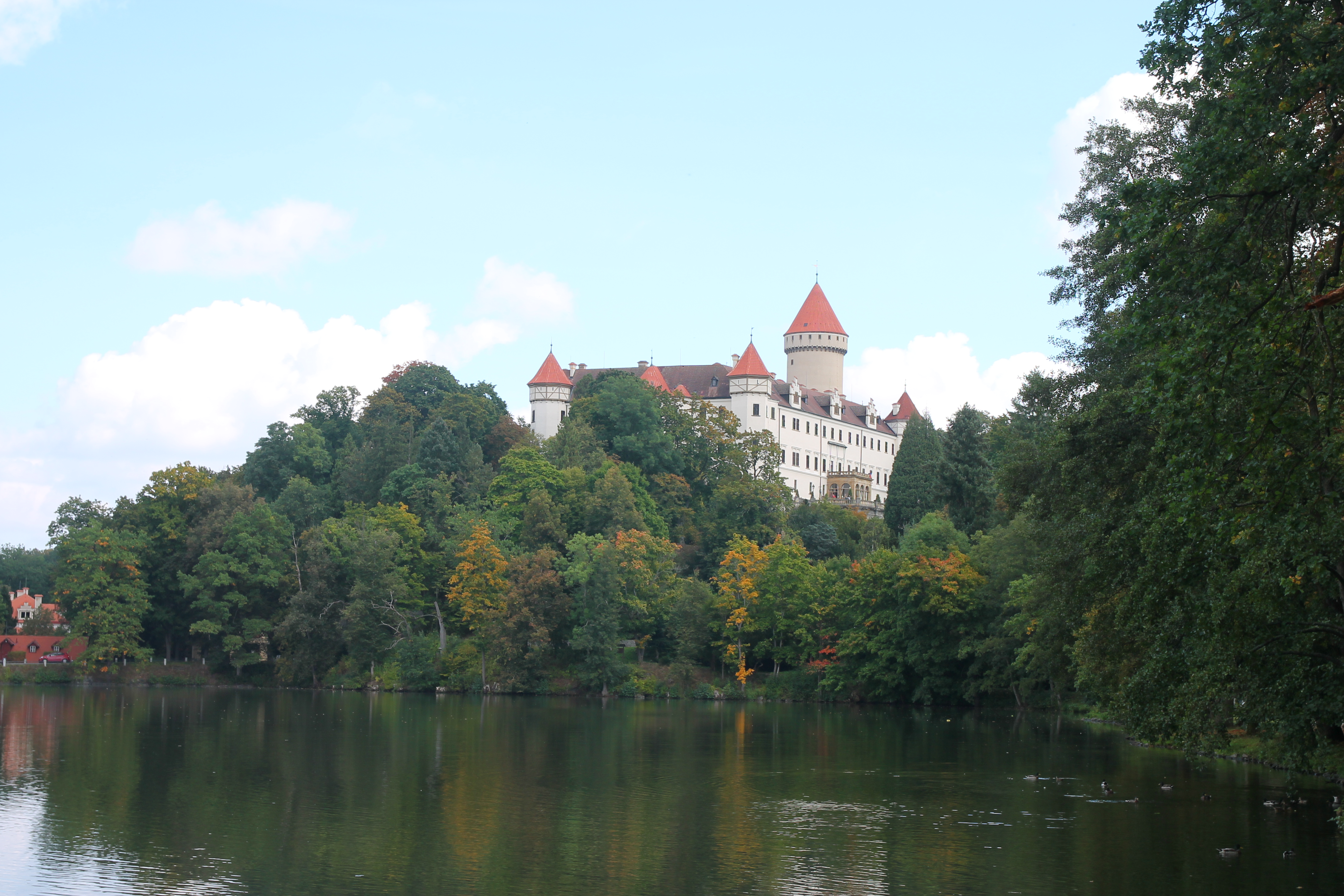
Konopiště Castle

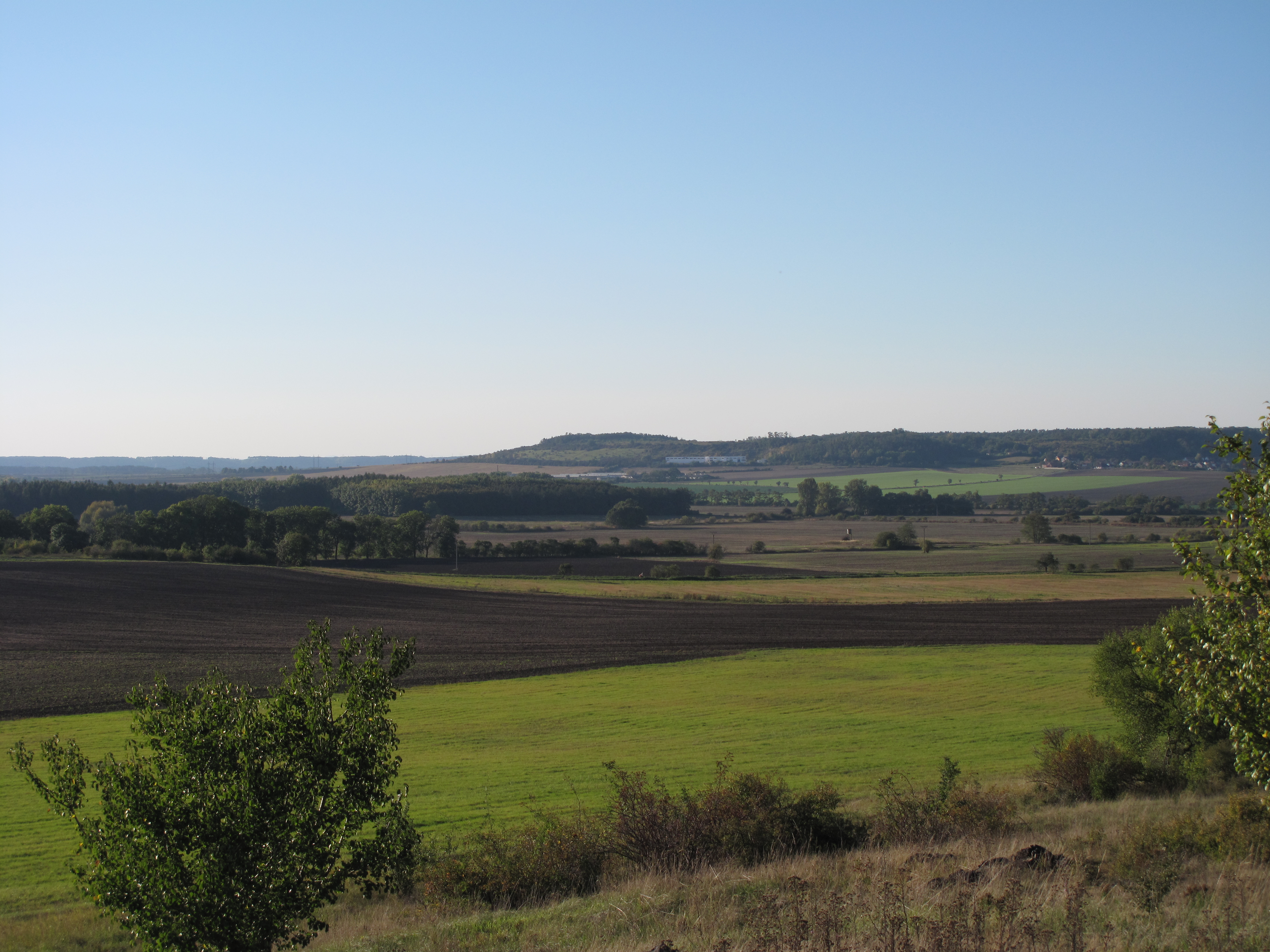
Countryside in the surroundings of Kopeč village (Mělník District)

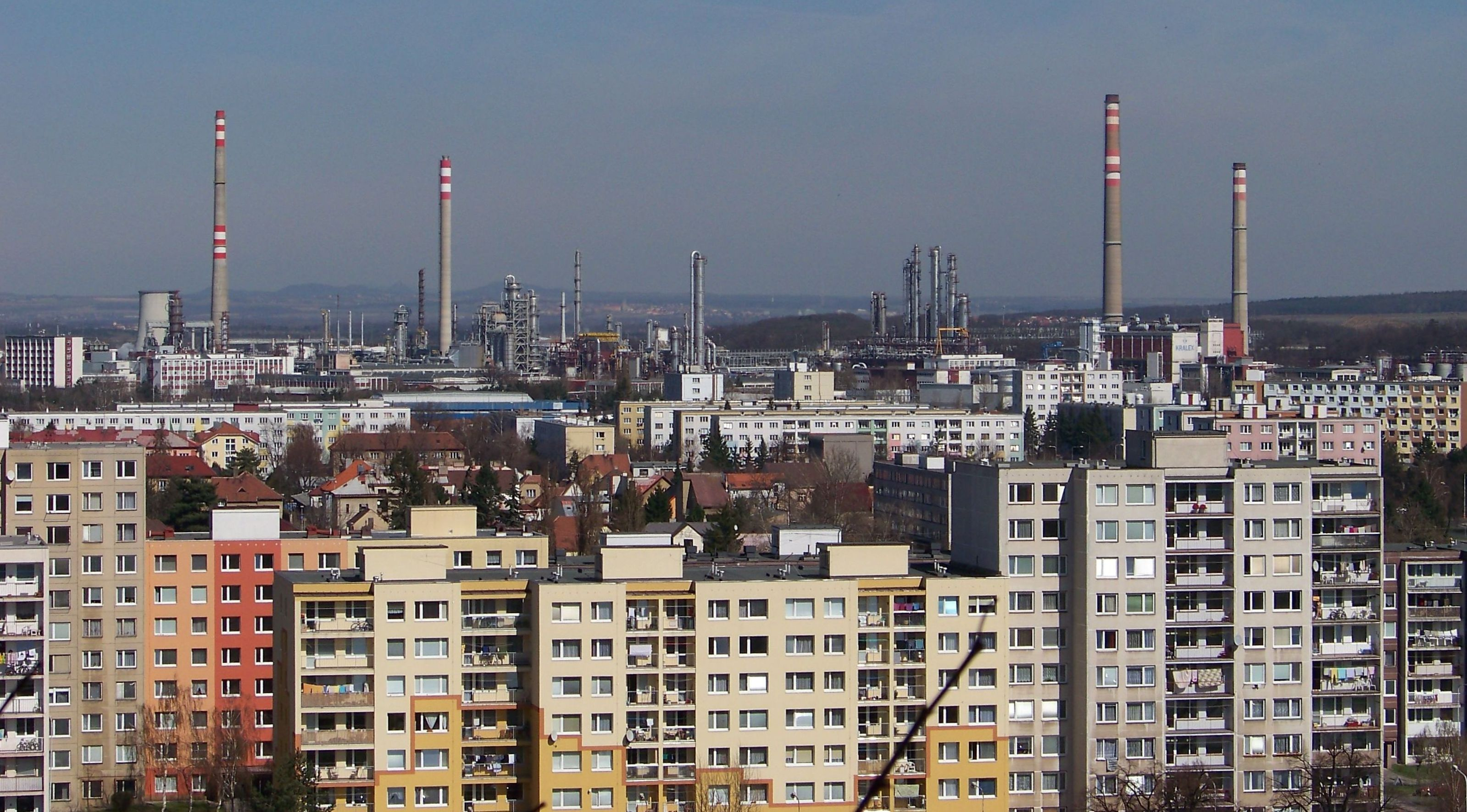
A view from Hostibejk hill at Kralupy nad Vltavou

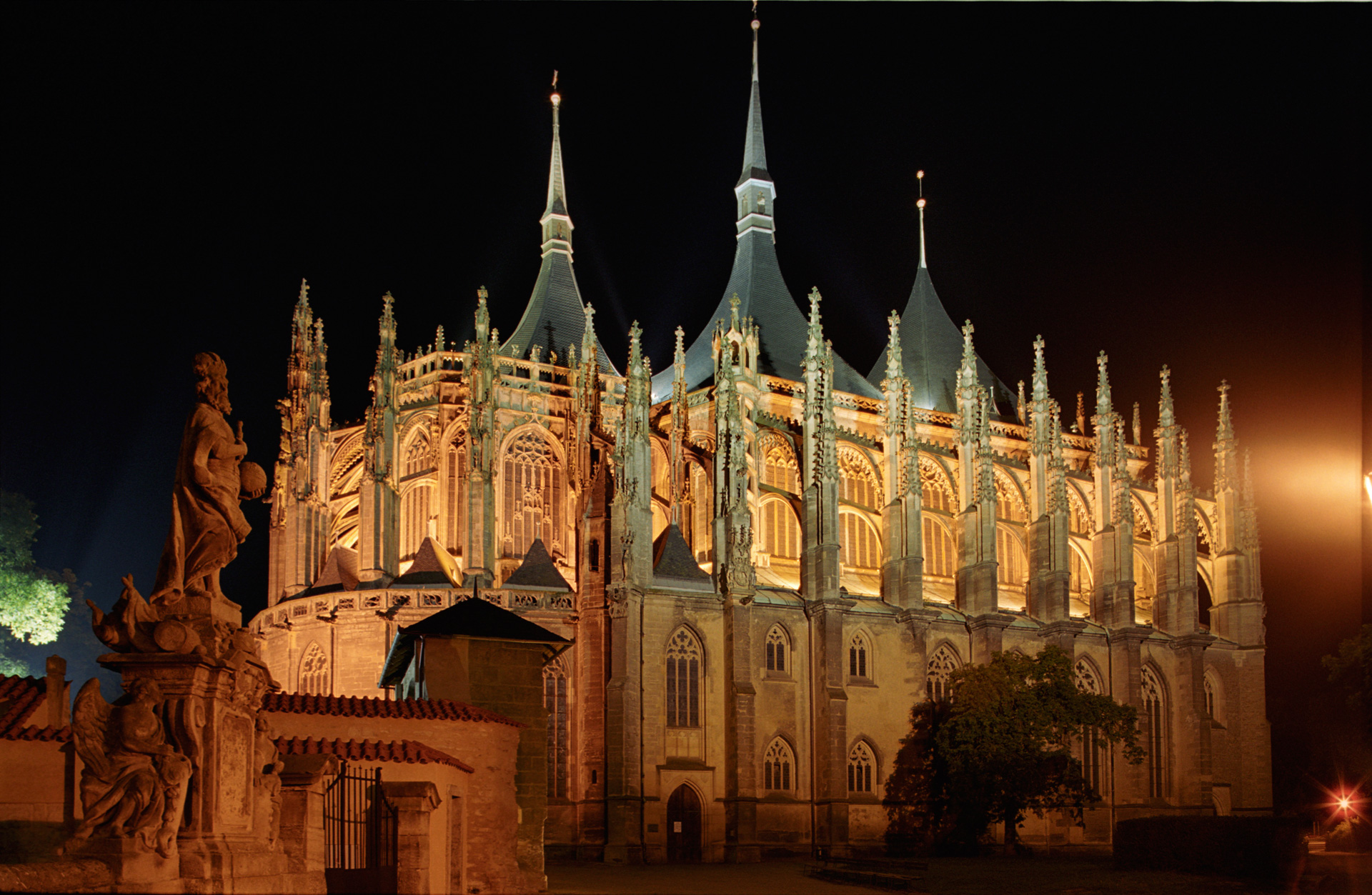
Kutná Hora, St. Barbara Church at the night

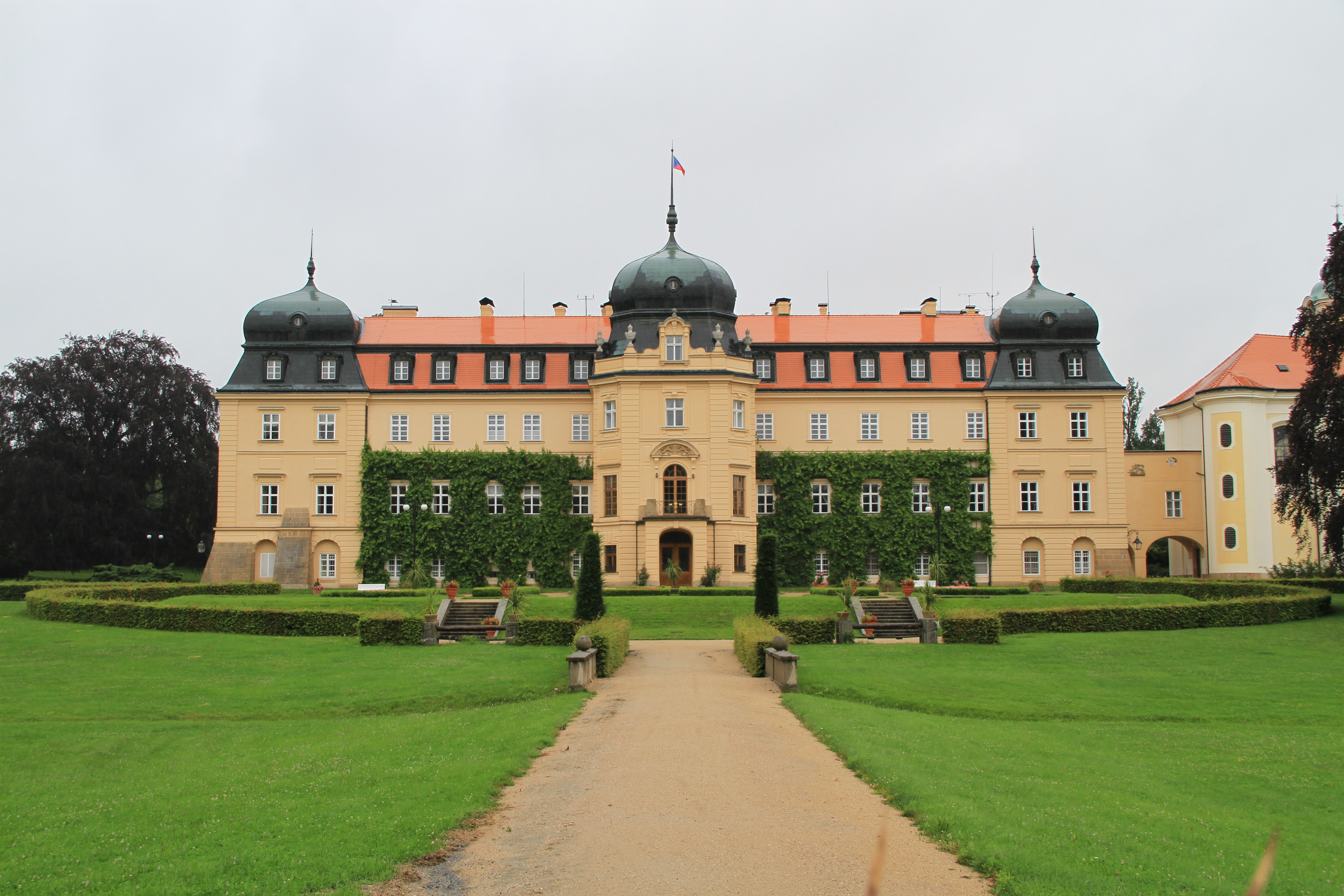
Lány Castle

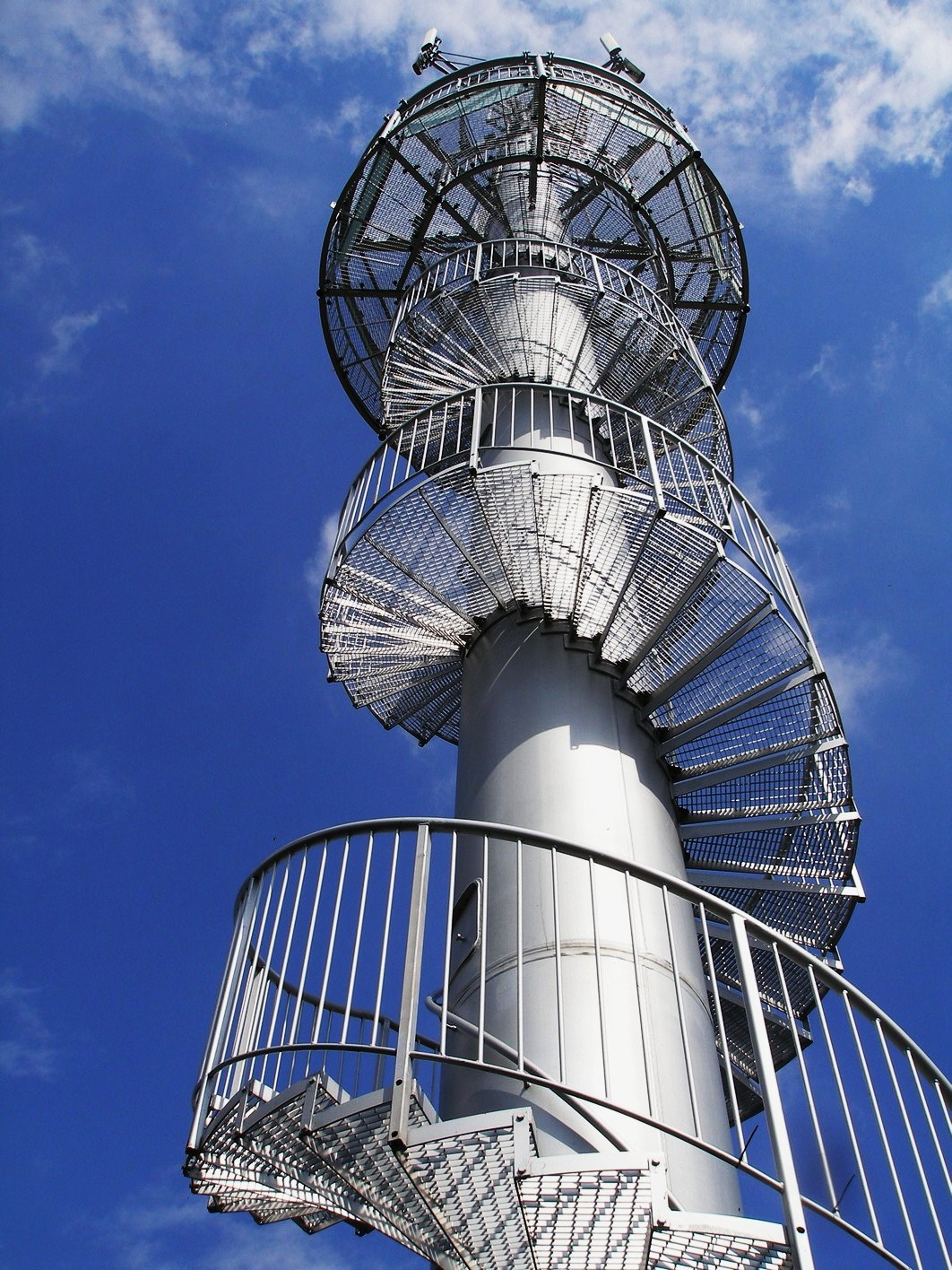
Observation tower at Macek hill in Nové Strašecí

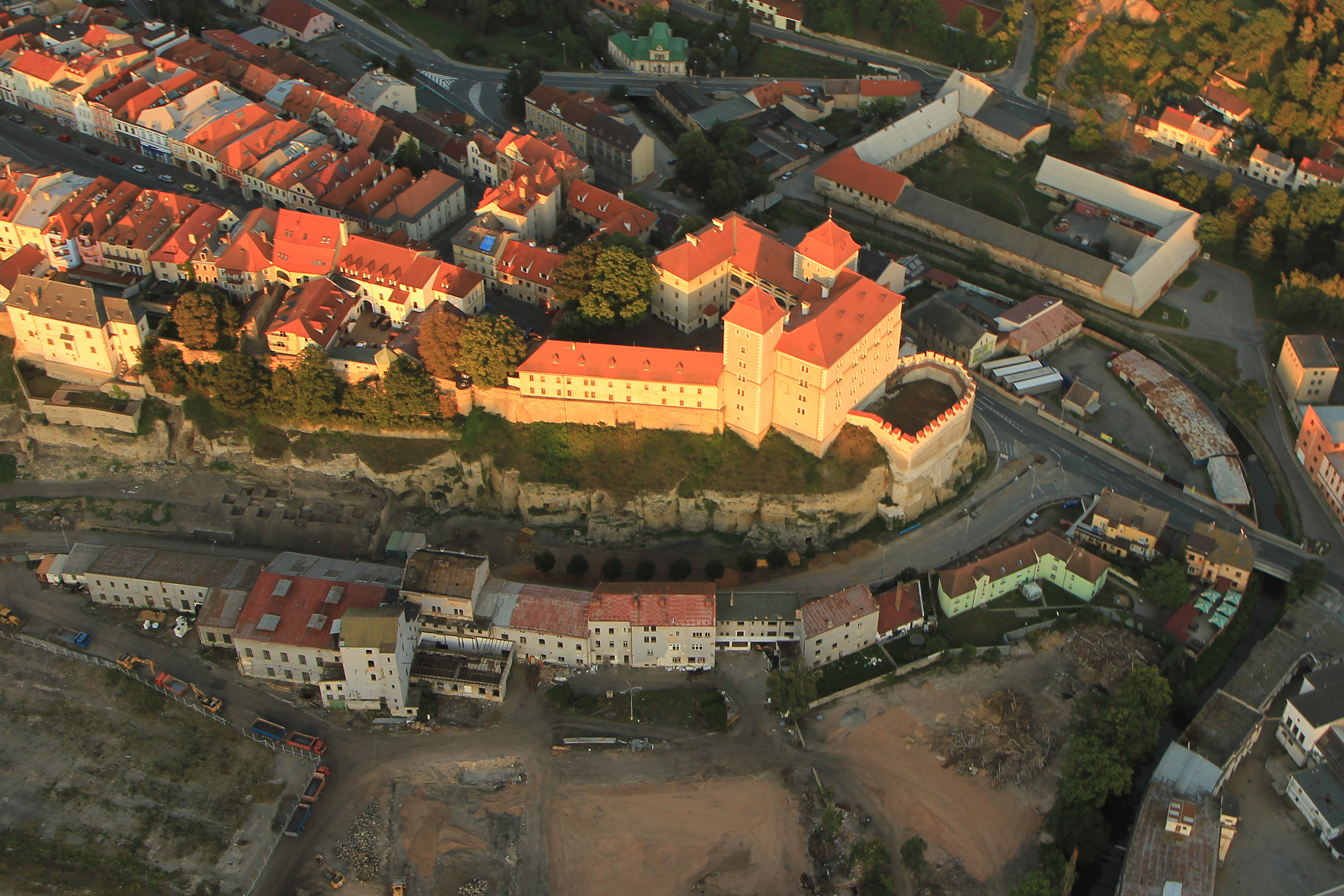
Mladá Boleslav

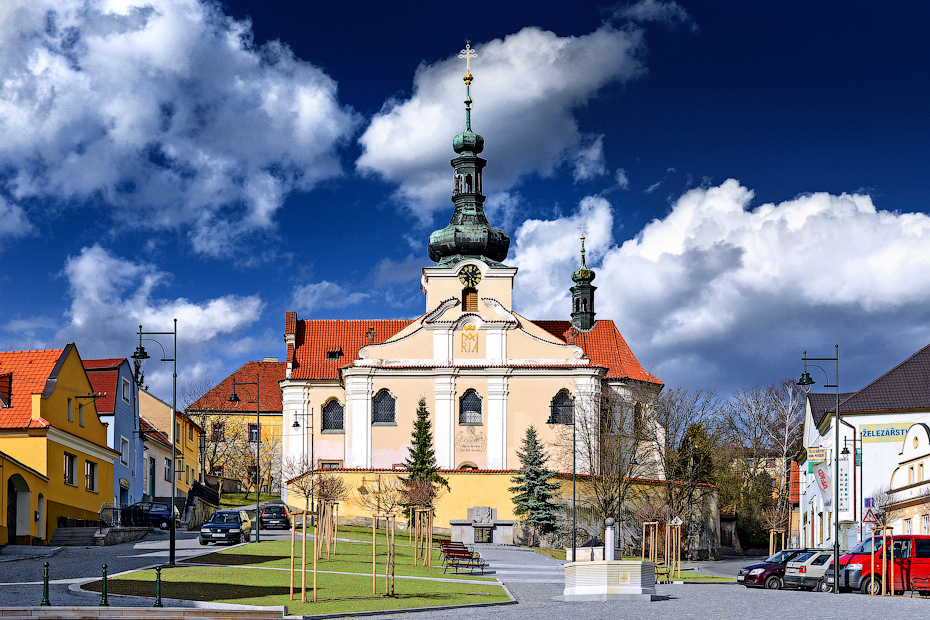
Mnichovice

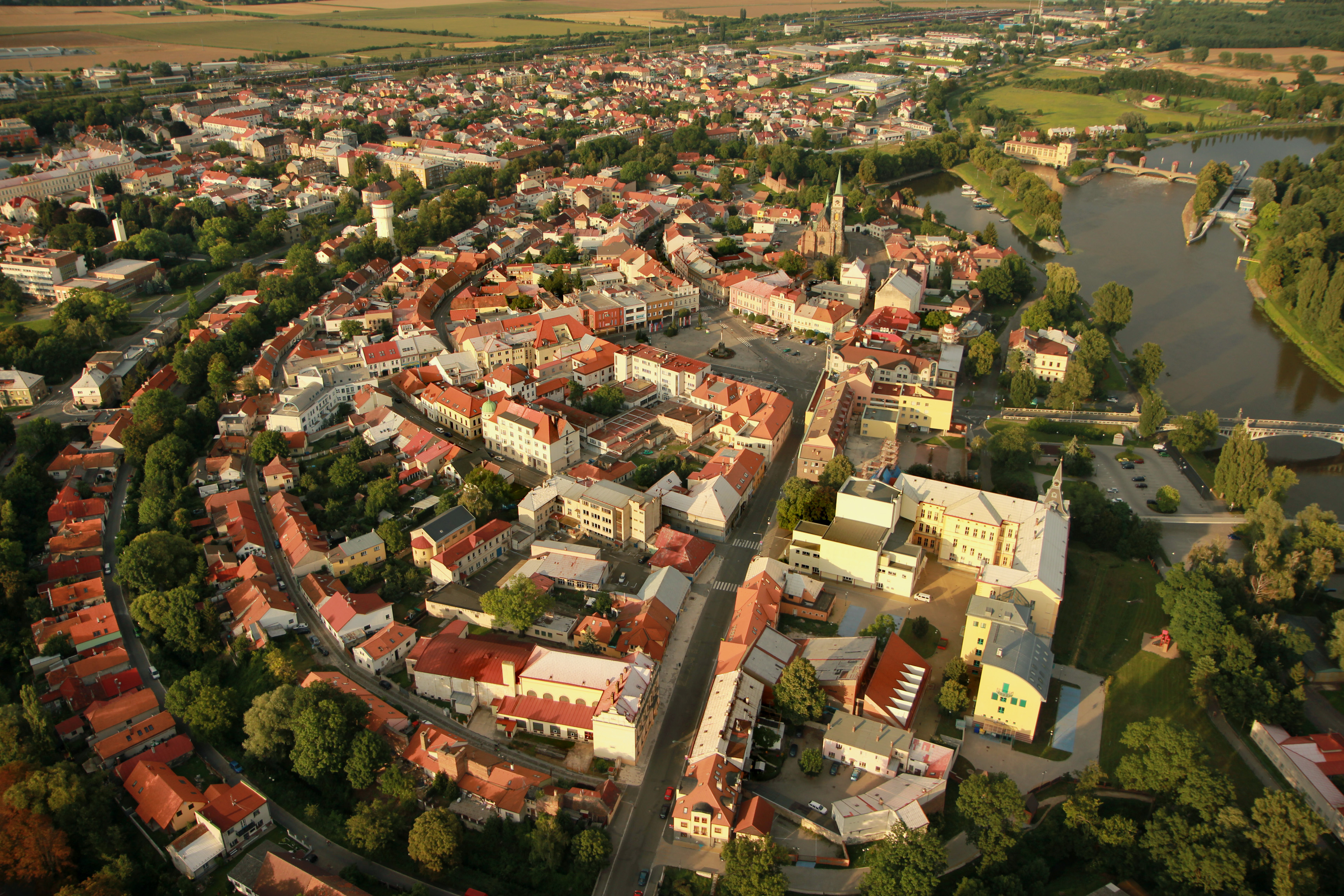
Nymburk

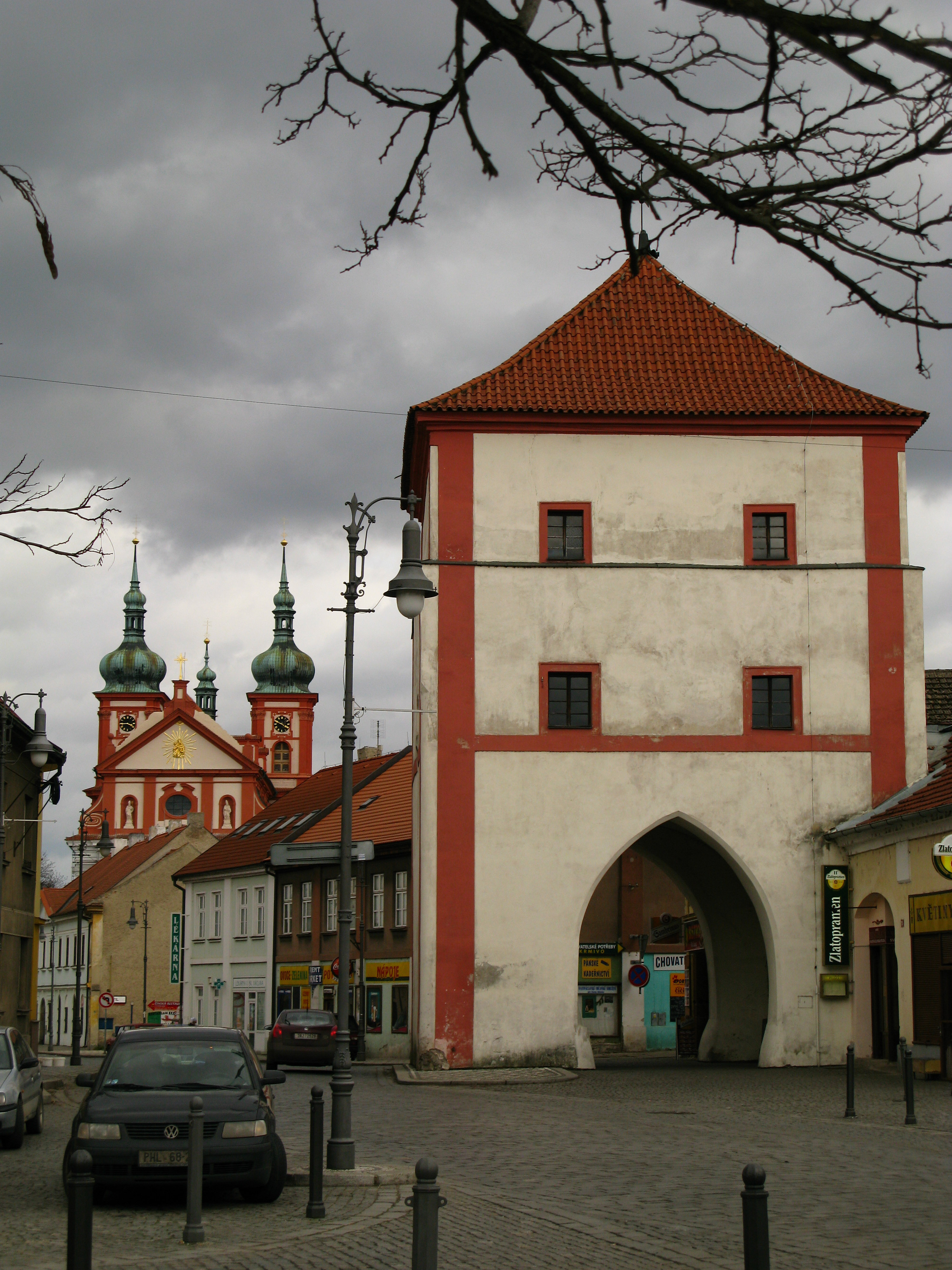
Stará Boleslav

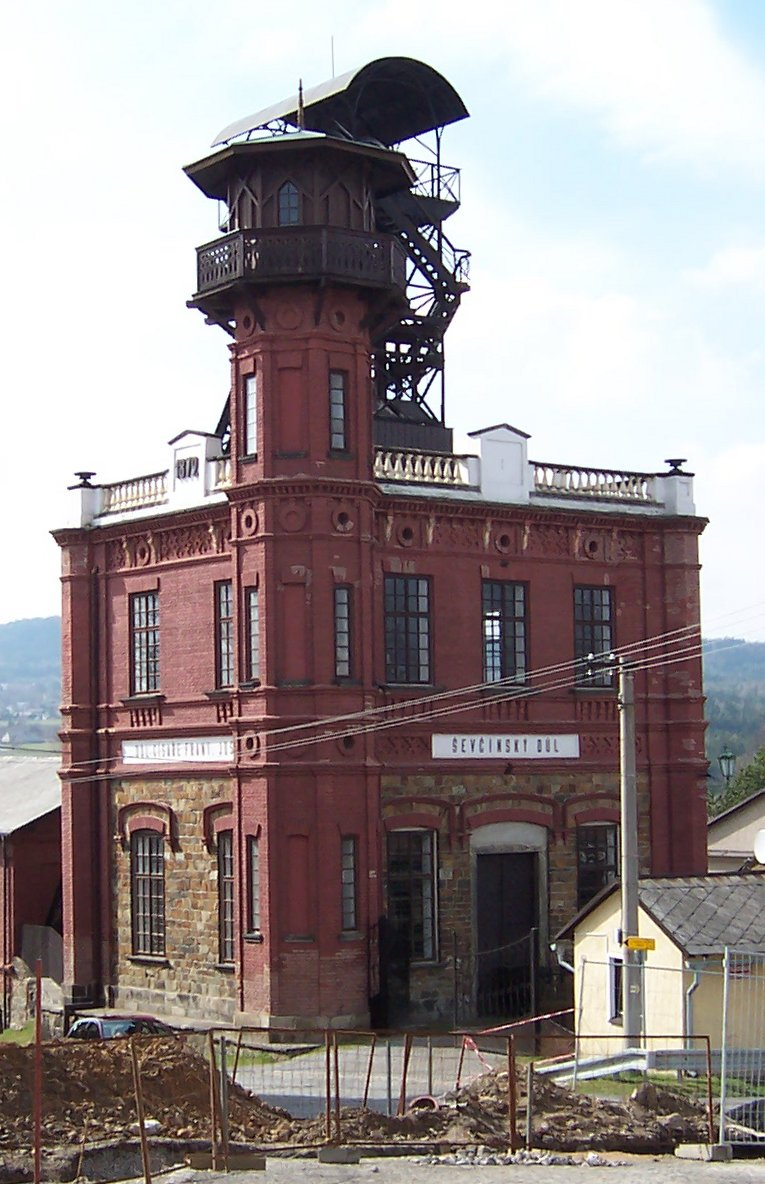
A shaft building of the Ševčín shaft in Příbram

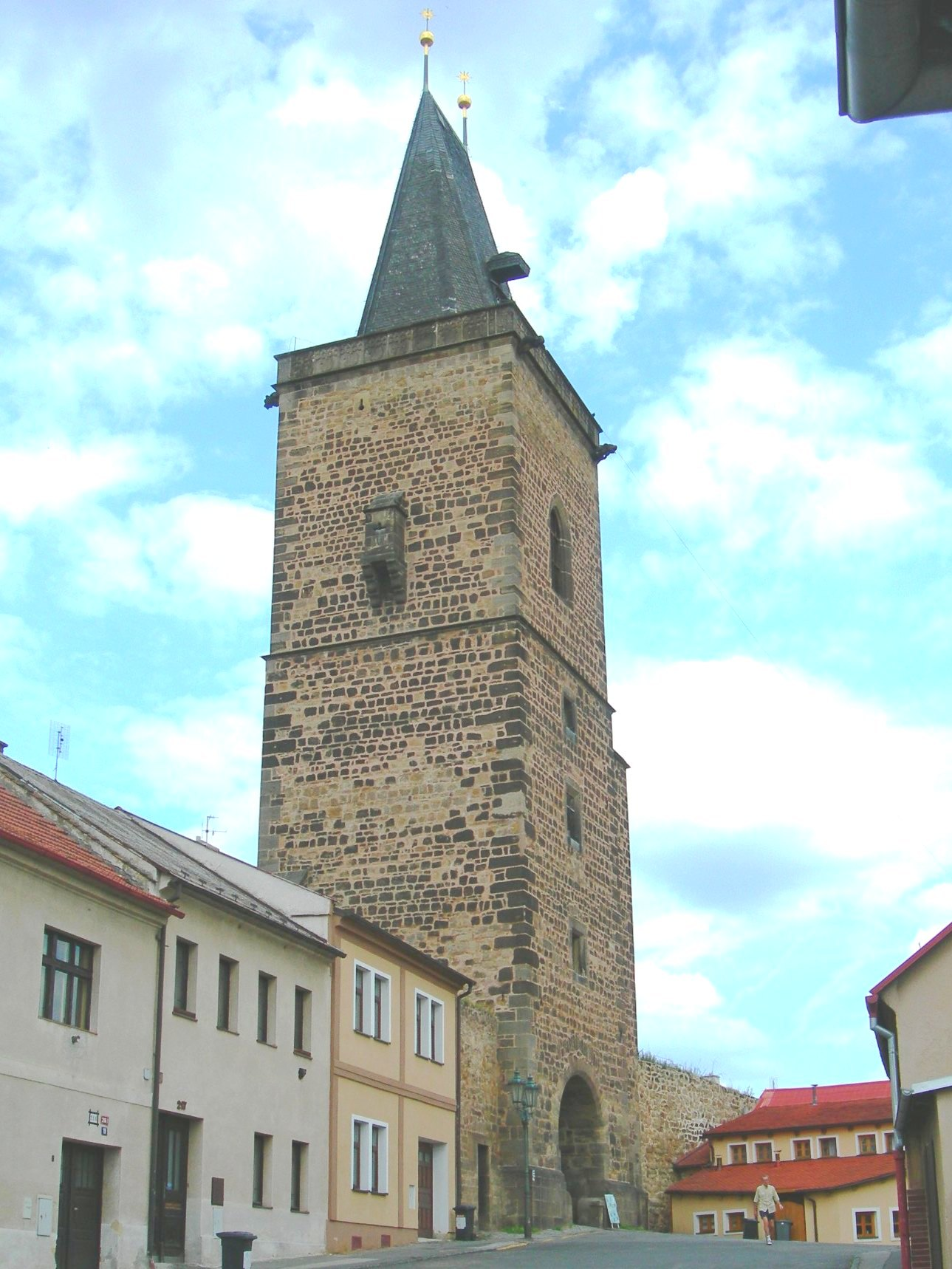
High Gate in Rakovník

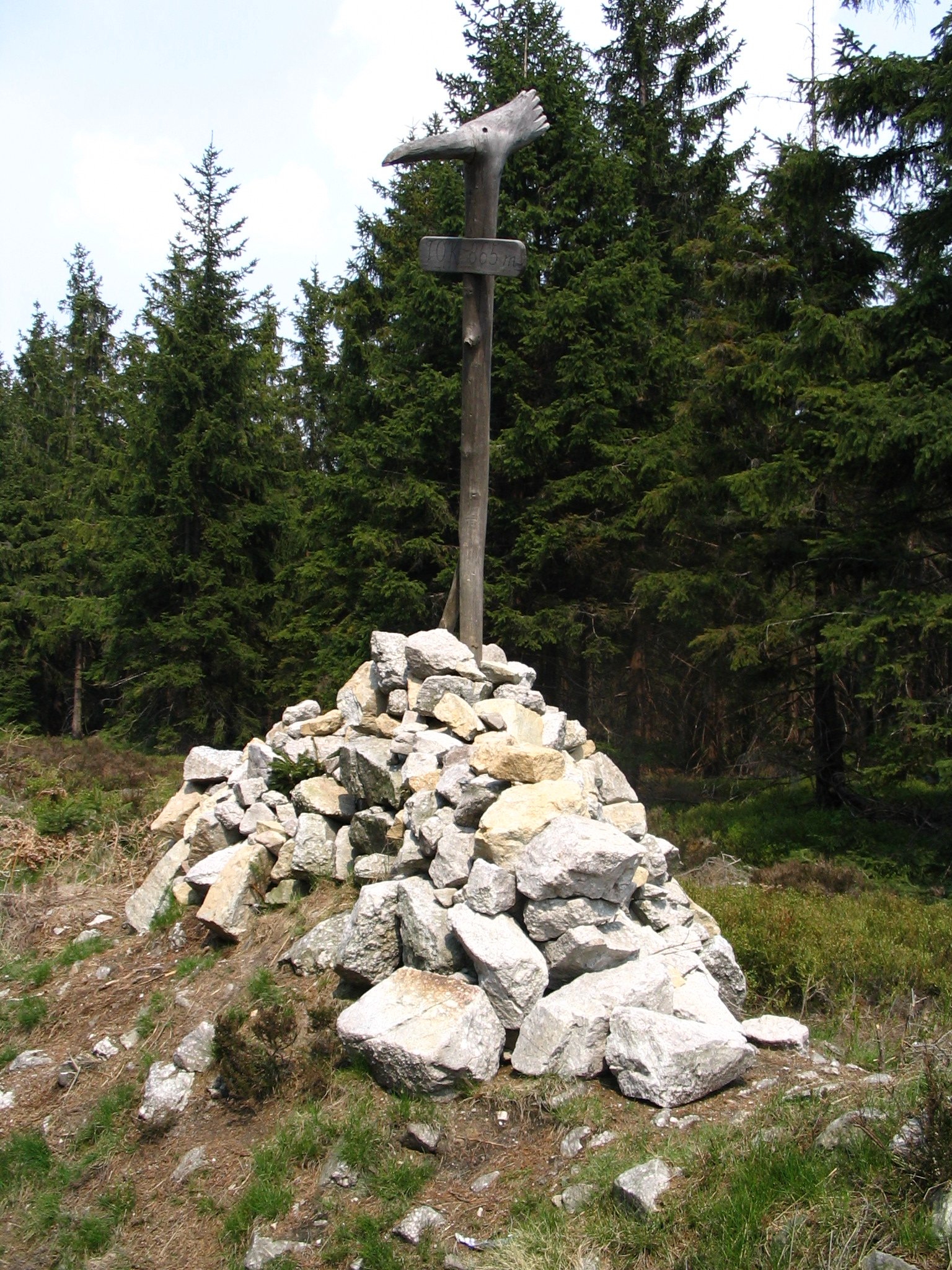
Tok hill

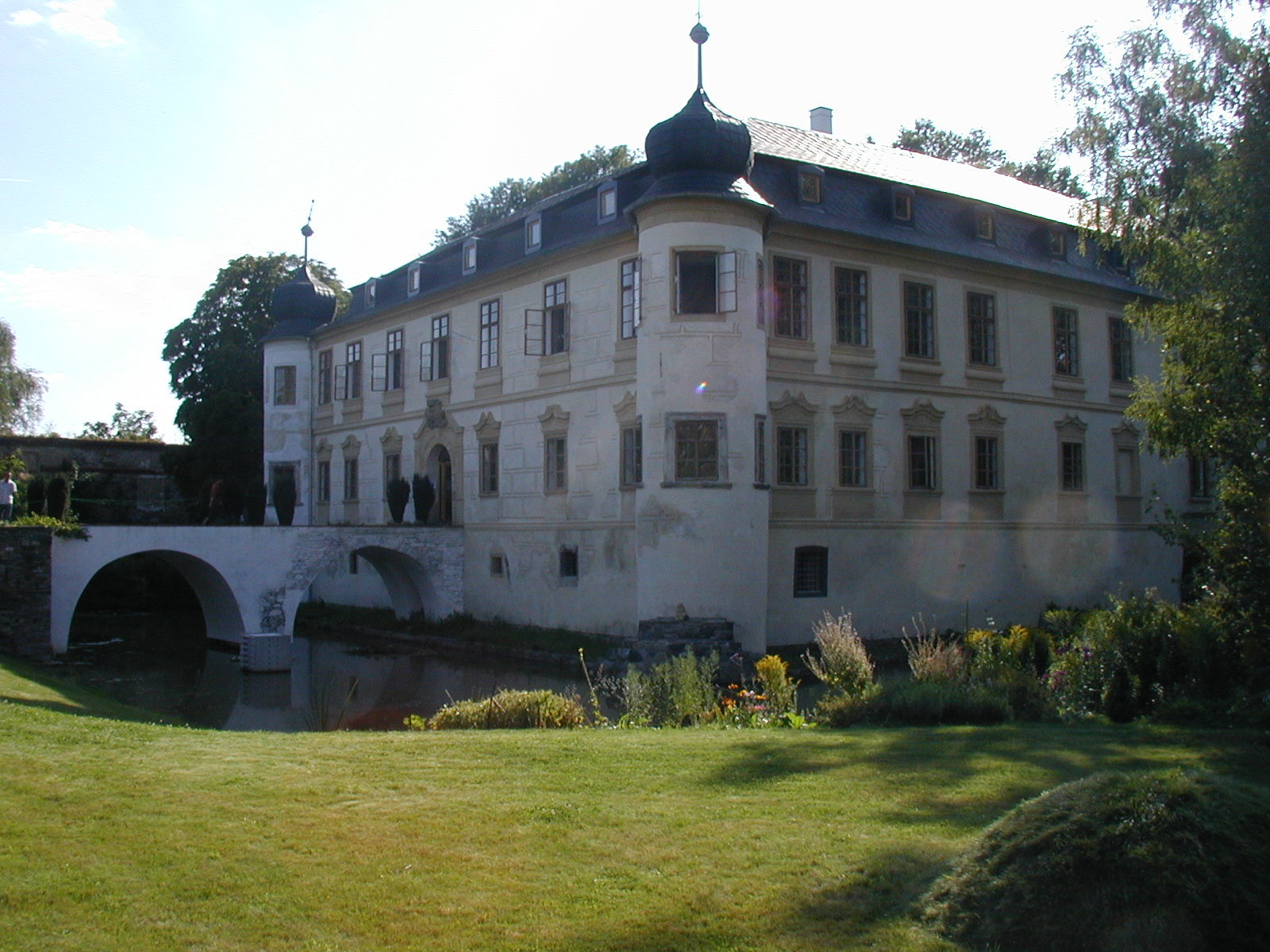
Třebešice Castle (Kutná Hora District)
