= Církvice =

Církvice may refer to places in the Czech Republic:

- Církvice (Kolín District), a municipality and village in the Central Bohemian Region
- Církvice (Kutná Hora District), a municipality and village in the Central Bohemian Region
- Církvice, a village and part of Ústí nad Labem in the Ústí nad Labem Region
