= Stolpersteine in Kolín =

Memorial installations in Czech Republic

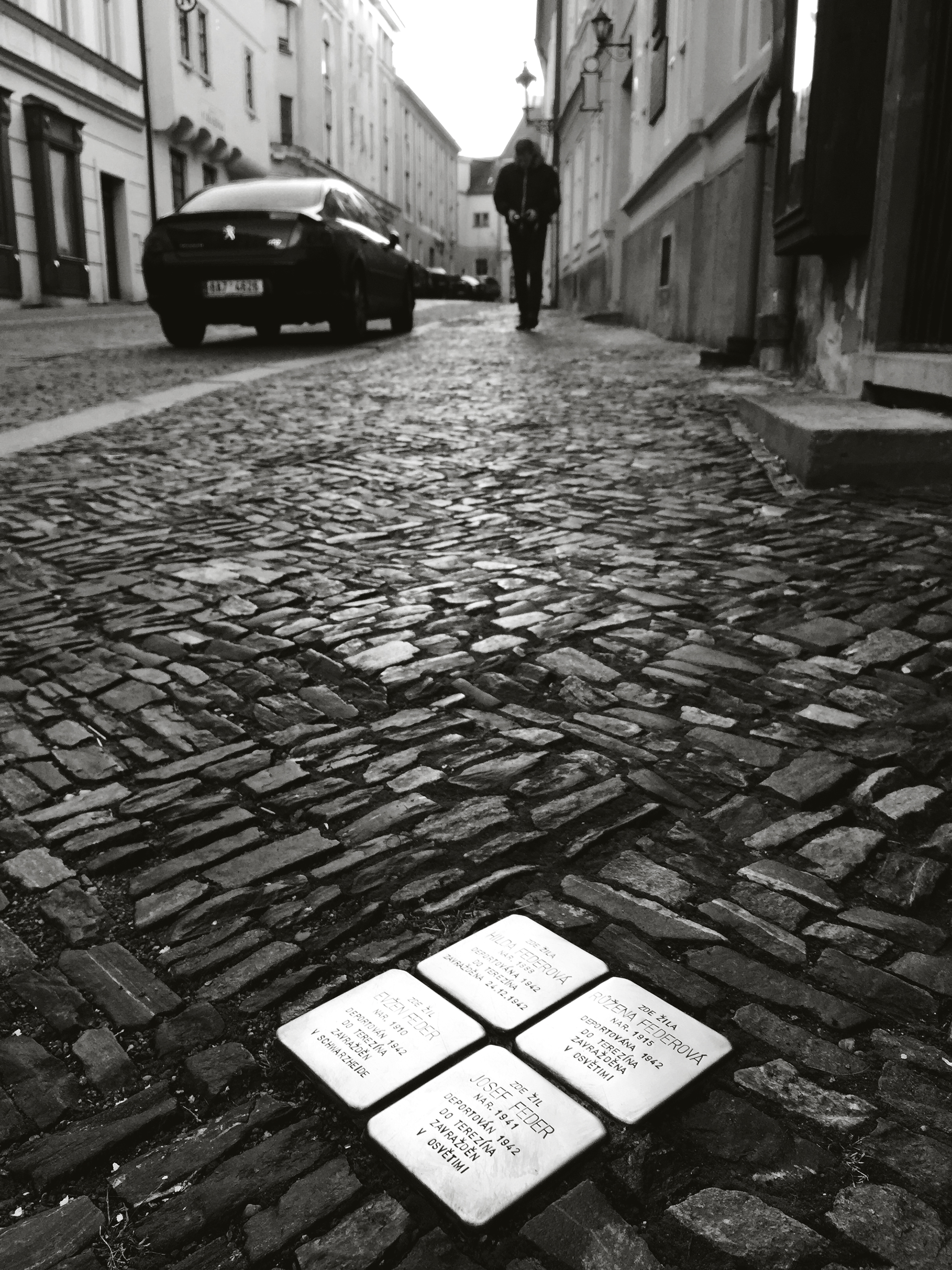
Stolpersteine for members of the Feder family in Kolín Photography by Francisco Peralta Torrejón

This article lists the Stolpersteine in the town of Kolín in the Central Bohemian Region (Czech: Středočeský kraj). Stolpersteine is the German name for stumbling blocks collocated all over Europe by German artist Gunter Demnig. They remember the fate of the Nazi victims being murdered, deported, exiled or driven to suicide.

Generally, the stumbling blocks are posed in front of the building where the victims had their last self-chosen residence. The name of the Stolpersteine in Czech is: Kameny zmizelých, stones of the disappeared.

== Kolín ==
A website lists 466 names of Jews from Kolín and, if known, what happened with them. Additional fourteen persons could not be identified. The Stolpersteine from Kolín thus memorize only a small fraction of the Jewish losses during the Shoah.

Stone	Inscription	Location	Life and death
	HERE LIVED; EVŽEN FEDER; BORN 1910; DEPORTED 1942; TO THERESIENSTADT; MURDERED; IN SCHWARZHEIDE	Na Hradbách 124; 50°01′41″N 15°11′58″E	Evžen Feder was born on 20 June 1910 in Gablonz. His parents were Richard Feder, the rabbi of Kolín, and Hilda. He had an older sister, Ruth (born on 19 December 1908 in Gablonz), and a younger brother, Viktor (born on 16 April 1915 in Kolín). He was married to Růžena (born 1915). The couple had one son, Josef (born 1941). On 13 June 1942, Evžen Feder, his wife, his son, his parents, his sister, his brother-in-law and his nephew were arrested and deported to Theresienstadt concentration camp by transport AAd. His transport number was 666 of 736. At that point, his brother Viktor, who was in Theresienstadt from January to April 1942, had already been deported to Zamość and been murdered by the Nazi regime. Thereafter, the family was systematically destroyed and nearly extinct. While his father served as a rabbi for the desperate inmates and tried to give them hope, his mother suffered from the conditions in the camp and died on 24 December of the same year. Nearly two years after their arrival, Evžen Feder, his wife and his son were separated from their family members and deported to Auschwitz concentration camp on 15 May 1944 by transport Dz. His transport number was 387 of 2,501. There, father, mother and son, age two and a half years, were murdered. On 28 October 1944, at last, his sister, her husband Pavel Heller and their 15 years old son Walter were deported to Auschwitz and gassed immediately after arrival. Richard Feder survived the Shoah, returned to Kolín and reestablished the Jewish community there. In 1947, he wrote a book about The Jewish Tragedy, dedicated to his murdered fellow citizens. In 1953 he was named chief land rabbi in Brno. In 1970 he died at the age of 95.
	HERE LIVED; JOSEF FEDER; BORN 1941; DEPORTED 1942; TO THERESIENSTADT; MURDERED; IN AUSCHWITZ	Na Hradbách 124; 50°01′41″N 15°11′58″E	Josef Feder was born on 13 October 1941 in Kolín. He was the only son of Evžen Feder and Růžena Federová. Still as a baby, on 13 June 1942, he, his parents, his grandparents, aunt, uncle and cousin were arrested and deported to Theresienstadt concentration camp by transport AAd. His transport number was 668 of 736. His family was systematically destroyed and nearly extinct by the Nazi regime. Even before his arrival, his uncle had been deported to Zamość. His grandmother died on 24 December of the same year. Nearly two years after their arrival, the little boy and his parents were separated from the other family members and deported to Auschwitz concentration camp on 15 May 1944 by transport Dz. His transport number was 389 of 2,501. There, Josef Feder, age two and a half years, and his parents were murdered.
	HERE LIVED; HILDA FEDEROVÁ; BORN 1888; DEPORTED 1942; TO THERESIENSTADT; MURDERED 24.12.1942	Na Hradbách 124; 50°01′41″N 15°11′58″E	Hilda Federová was born on 24 February 1888. She was married to Rabbi Richard Feder. The couple had three children, Ruth (born 1908 in Gablonz), Evžen (born 1910 in Gablonz) and Viktor (born 1915 in Kolín). Her last residence before deportation was in Kolín. On 13 June 1942, Hilda Federová and her family were arrested and deported to Theresienstadt concentration camp by transport AAd. His transport number was 664 of 736. She died there on 24 December 1942. All her children and grandchildren were murdered in the course of the Shoah. Only her husband could survive. He died in 1970, age 95.
	HERE LIVED; RŮŽENA FEDEROVÁ; BORN 1915; DEPORTED 1942; TO THERESIENSTADT; MURDERED; IN AUSCHWITZ	Na Hradbách 124; 50°01′41″N 15°11′58″E	Růžena Federová was born on 16 March 1915. She was married to Evžen Feder. The couple had one son, Josef (born 1941). On 13 June 1942, Růžena Federová and her family, the parents and sister of her husband were arrested and deported to Theresienstadt concentration camp by transport AAd. Her transport number was 667 of 736. Nearly two years after their arrival, she, her husband and their son were separated from the other family members and deported to Auschwitz concentration camp on 15 May 1944 by transport Dz. Her transport number was 388 of 2,501. There, father, mother and son, age two and a half years, were murdered.
	HERE LIVED; ALFRED FISCHER; BORN 1900; DEPORTED 1942; TO THERESIENSTADT; MURDERED 8.10.1942; IN TREBLINKA	Karlovo náměstí 20; 50°01′40″N 15°12′06″E	Alfred Fischer was born on 14 April 1900 in Třebíč. His parents were Eduard Fischer and Auguste née Zeisel. He had at least one brother, Karel. He was married to Marta née Eckstein. The couple had three children, Karel (born on 13 June 1918), Eugenie (born 1931) and Edita (born 1935). The last residence of the family before deportation was in Kolín. On 13 June 1942, Alfred Fischer, his wife and his little daughters were arrested and deported to Theresienstadt concentration camp by transport Aad. His transport number was 56 of 736. After four months, on 8 October 1942, the family was deported to Treblinka extermination camp. His transport number was 40 of 1,000. There, father, mother and the two daughters were murdered by the Nazi regime. Their son Karel survived the Shoah. He later called himself Karel Avi Ophir. He died in 1996 in Israel. The fate of Alfred Fischer's parents and that of his brother Karel remains unknown.
	HERE LIVED; EDITA FISCHEROVÁ; BORN 1935; DEPORTED 1942; TO THERESIENSTADT; MURDERED 8.10.1942; IN TREBLINKA	Karlovo náměstí 20; 50°01′40″N 15°12′06″E	Edita Fischerová was born on 24 April 1935 in Kolín. Her parents were Alfred Fischer and Martanée Eckstein. She and her sister Eugenie (born in 1931) grew up in Kolín, she also had an older brother, Karel (born 1918). On 13 June 1942, the girl, her sister and her parents were arrested and deported to Theresienstadt concentration camp by transport AAd. Her transport number was 59 of 736. Four months later, on 8 October 1942, the family was deported to Treblinka extermination camp. Her transport number was 43 of 1,000. There, mother, father and the two daughters were murdered by the Nazi regime. Edita Fischerová was 7 years old. Only their brother could survive the Shoah.
	HERE LIVED; EUGENIE FISCHEROVÁ; BORN 1931; DEPORTED 1942; TO THERESIENSTADT; MURDERED 8.10.1942; IN TREBLINKA	Karlovo náměstí 20; 50°01′40″N 15°12′06″E	Eugenie Fischerová, also Evženie, was born on 2 November 1931 in Kolín. Her parents were Alfred Fischer and Marta née Eckstein. She and her sister Edita (born in 1935) grew up in Kolín, she also had an older brother, Karel (born 1918). On 13 June 1942, the girl, her sister and her parents were arrested and deported to Theresienstadt concentration camp by transport AAd. Her transport number was 58 of 736. Four months later, on 8 October 1942, the family was deported to Treblinka extermination camp. Her transport number was 42 of 1,000. There, mother, father and the two daughters were murdered by the Nazi regime. Eugenie Fischerová was 10 years old. Only their brother could survive the Shoah.
	HERE LIVED; MARTA FISCHEROVÁ; BORN 1900; DEPORTED 1942; TO THERESIENSTADT; MURDERED 8.10.1942; IN TREBLINKA	Karlovo náměstí 20; 50°01′40″N 15°12′06″E	Marta Fischerová née Eckstein was born 1 May 1900 in Kolín. Her parents were Eduard Eckstein and Filipa née Freund. She had four siblings, Adolf (born 1890), Růžena (born 1893, later Glöcknerová), Josef (born 1897) and František (born 1906). She was married to Alfred Fischer. The couple had three children, Karel (born on 13 June 1918), Eugenie (born 1931) and Edita (born 1935). The last residence of the family before deportation was in Kolín. On 13 June 1942, Marta Fischerová, her husband and her little daughters were arrested and deported to Theresienstadt concentration camp by transport AAd. Her transport number was 57 of 736. Four months later, on 8 October 1942, the family was deported to Treblinka extermination camp. Her transport number was 41 of 1,000. There, mother, father and the two daughters were murdered by the Nazi regime. All her siblings were killed during the Shoah: Adolf in 1942 in Trawniki, Josef in 1943 in Riga, Růžena and František both in 1944 in Auschwitz. Her son Karel survived the Shoah. He later-on called himself Karel Avi Ophir. He died in 1996 in Israel.
	HERE LIVED; ELSA HELLEROVÁ; BORN 1883; DEPORTED 1942; TO THERESIENSTADT; MURDERED; IN MALY TROSTENETS	ul. Karolíny Světlé 137; 50°01′38″N 15°12′02″E	Elsa Hellerová was born on 11 April 1883 in Kolín. Her last residence before deportation was in Kolín. On 13 June 1942, she was arrested and deported to Theresienstadt concentration camp by transport AAd. Her transport number was 31 of 736. Three months later, on 8 September 1942, she was deported to Maly Trostenets extermination camp by transport Bk. Her transport number was 26 of 1,000. There, Elsa Hellerová was murdered.
	HERE LIVED; OTTO KODÍČEK; BORN 1888; DEPORTED 1942; TO THERESIENSTADT; MURDERED; IN AUSCHWITZ	Karlovo náměstí 91; 50°01′42″N 15°12′03″E	Otto Kodiček, also Ota, was born on 16 August 1888 in Kolín. His residence before deportation was in Kolín. On 13 June 1942, he was arrested and deported to Theresienstadt concentration camp by transport AAd. His transport number was 156 of 736. There he remained interned for more than two years and three months. On 1 October 1944, he was deported to Auschwitz concentration camp by transport Em. His transport number was 665 of 1,501. He was murdered there.
	HERE LIVED; GUSTAV MANDELÍK; BORN 1868; DEPORTED 1942; TO THERESIENSTADT; MURDERED 31.10.1942	Pražská ulice 1; 50°01′41″N 15°11′59″E	Gustav Mandelík was born on 21 August 1868 in Kolín. His parents were Ignatz Mandelik (1839–1899) and Marie née Kobler (1847–1916). He had twelve siblings. At least five of them died in early childhood. He was a merchant and married to Růžena née Lewith. The couple had three children: Zdeňka (born on 13 April 1897 in Kolín, married to Robert Nettl from Nové Dvory, a daughter named Eva, born on 10 May 1922); Ignaz Paul (born on 6 March 1900, fate unknown); Erich Walter (born on 29 July 1904, fate unknown) Erick Walter Mandelik died in London in 1976. He is survived by his daughter and granddaughter, Patricia and Sally.; The last residence of Gustav Mandelík and his wife before deportation was in Kolín. On 13 June 1942, they were deported to Theresienstadt concentration camp by transport AAd. His transport number was 138 of 736. On 10 August 1942, his daughter Zdeňka and his granddaughter Eva arrived in Theresienstadt, being deported from Prague. Nevertheless, Gustav Mandelík died on 31 October of the same year in Theresienstadt, due to Cachexia caused by starvation, overpopulation and lack of hygiene. His wife, his granddaughter Eva and his brother Max all lost their lives in 1943 in Auschwitz. His daughter Zdeňka and her husband were murdered in 1944 in Auschwitz. The fate of his siblings Ernestine and Karl is unknown.
	HERE LIVED; RŮŽENA; MANDELÍKOVÁ; BORN 1873; DEPORTED 1942; TO THERESIENSTADT; MURDERED; IN AUSCHWITZ	Pražská ulice 1; 50°01′41″N 15°11′59″E	Růžena Mandelíková née Lewith, also Rosalie, was born on 24 April 1873. Her parents were Jonathan/Jonas Lewith (ca. 1842–1928) and Ewa/Elisabeth née Lederer (ca. 1841–1914). She had eight siblings. She was married to Gustav Mandelík. The couple had three children: Zdeňka (born on 13 April 1897 in Kolín), Ignaz Paul (born on 6 March 1900), Erich Walter (born on 29 July 1904). Her daughter later was married to Robert Nettl from Nové Dvory (born 1891), they had a daughter named Eva, born on 10 May 1922. The last residence of Růžena Mandelíková and her husband before deportation was in Kolín. On 13 June 1942, they were deported to Theresienstadt concentration camp by transport AAd. Her transport number was 139 of 736. On 10 August 1942, their daughter, the son-in law and their granddaughter also arrived in Theresienstadt, being deported from Prague. On 31 October 1942, her husband died due to Cachexia. Nearly one year later, her granddaughter Eva was separated from the family and deported to Auschwitz concentration camp, where she was murdered. On 15 December 1943, also Růžena Mandelíková was deported to Auschwitz by transport Dr. Her transport number was 1370 of 2,519. She was murdered by the Nazi regime, most probably in one of the gas chambers. Also her brother Richard lost his life in 1943 in Auschwitz. Her daughter Zdeňka, her son-in-law Robert Nettl and her sister Gizela Brumlová were all murdered in 1944, also in Auschwitz. The fate of her two sons and of her other six siblings is unknown.
	HERE LIVED; FRANTIŠEK MEISL; BORN 1900; DEPORTED 1942; TO THERESIENSTADT; MURDERED; IN AUSCHWITZ	Kutnohorská 31; 50°01′39″N 15°12′07″E	František Meisl, also Ferentz Meisel, was born on 17 August 1900 in Kolín. His parents were Albert Meisl and Růžena née Weisberger. He had two sisters and one brother: Gusta (born 1895), Anna (born 1897) and Pavel (born 1902). On 7 May 1942, he was deported from Prague to Theresienstadt concentration camp by transport At. His transport number was 337 of 1,001. Five weeks later, his mother, his sister Gusta and her husband arrived from Kolín. His other sister Anna and her husband had already been in Theresienstadt since February 1942. Step by step the whole family was torn apart and murdered. First the two sisters and their husbands were deported to extermination camps, one couple to Raasiku, the other to Treblinka. Then his mother died on 11 January 1943, then his aunt Hedvika on 6 December 1943. Twelve days later, on 18 December 1943, František Meisl was deported to Auschwitz concentration camp by transport Ds. His transport number was 614 of 2,503. He was murdered there by the Nazi regime. Also his brother Pavel was killed in the course of the Shoah. The fate of his wife is unknown.
	HERE LIVED; PAVEL MEISL; BORN 1902; POLITICAL PRISONER; DIED	Kutnohorská 31; 50°01′39″N 15°12′07″E	Pavel Meisl, also Paul, was born on 16 March 1902 in Kolín. His parents were Albert Meisl and Růžena née Weisberger. He had two sisters and one brother: Gusta (born 1895), Anna (born 1897) and František (born 1900). His last place of registration in the Protectorate was in Prague XIII, Ruská 64. He was murdered by the Nazi regime. The whereabouts of his death are not known. His mother and all his siblings were also killed in the course of the Shoah. The fate of his wife is unknown.
	HERE LIVED; RŮŽENA MEISLOVÁ; BORN 1874; DEPORTED 1942; TO THERESIENSTADT; MURDERED; IN THERESIENSTADT	Kutnohorská 31; 50°01′39″N 15°12′07″E	Růžena Meislová née Weisberger, also Rosa Meisl, was born on 10 May 1874 in Kolín. Her parents were Jakob Weisberger and Maria née Heller. She had three sisters, Julie (born 1874), Pauline (born 1875) and Hedwig, also Hedvika, later married as Hoffmann. She was married to Albert Meisl. The couple had two daughters and two sons: Gusta (born on 7 July 1895), later married to Leo Schmolka, Anna (born 24 February 1897), later married to Rudolf Lebenhart, František (born 1900), later married to Klara Sara née Pick and; Pavel (born 1902), later married to Ludmilla.; Her last residence before deportation was in Kolín. On 13 June 1942, she, her sister Hedvika, her daughter Gusta and her son-in-law Leo Schmolka were arrested and deported to Theresienstadt concentration camp by transport AAd. Their transport numbers were 84, 85 and 345 of 736. Already there were her daughter Anna with her husband (since 8 February) and her son František (since 7 May). Step by step the whole family was torn apart and extinct. On 1 September 1942, daughter Anna and her husband were deported to Raasiku. On 8 October 1942, her daughter Gusta and her husband were deported to Treblinka extermination camp. On 11 January 1943, Růžena Meislová was brought to death in Theresienstadt. On 6 December 1943 her sister Hedvika lost her life in Theresienstadt. On 16 December 1943 her son František was deported to Auschwitz. He was murdered there. Her son Pavel was murdered at an unknown place. The fate of her sisters Julie and Pauline is unknown.
	HERE LIVED; DR. MED. DAVID MENDL; BORN 1876; DEPORTED 14.7.1942; MALY TROSTENETS; MURDERED	Kmochova ulice 335; 50°01′41″N 15°11′45″E	David Mendl was born on 30 September 1876 in Kolín. He studied medicine, became a physician and married Berta. The last residence of the couple before deportation was in Kolín. On 13 June 1942, MUDr. David Mendl and his wife were arrested and deported to Theresienstadt concentration camp by transport AAd. His transport number was 130 of 736. One months later, on 14 July 1942, the couple were deported to Maly Trostenets extermination camp by transport AAx. His transport number was 130 of 1,000. They lost their lives there.
	HERE LIVED; BERTA MENDLOVÁ; BORN 1879; DEPORTED 14.7.1942; MALY TROSTENETS; MURDERED	Kmochova ulice 335; 50°01′41″N 15°11′45″E	Berta Mendlová was born on 25 May 1879 in Kolín. She was married to MUDr. David Mendl, a physician. It is not known if the couple had children or not. The last residence of the couple before deportation was in Kolín. On 13 June 1942, Berta Mendlová and her husband were arrested and deported to Theresienstadt concentration camp by transport AAd. Her transport number was 131 of 736. One months later, on 14 July 1942, the couple were deported to Maly Trostenets extermination camp by transport AAx. Her transport number was 129 of 1,000. They lost their lives there.
	HERE LIVED; DR. JUR. KAREL; ORNSTEIN; BORN 1901; DEPORTED 1942; TO THERESIENSTADT; MURDERED 18.12.1943; IN AUSCHWITZ	Karlovo náměstí 89; 50°01′42″N 15°12′03″E	Karel Ornstein was born on 27 August 1901. His parents were Dr. Josef Ornstein (born on 17 May 1863) and Hermine née Brod (born on 28 March 1880 in Dolní Bučice). He studied law, achieved a doctorate and married Rita née Bauer. The couple had at least one daughter, Eva (born 1938), and they lived together with Karl Ornstein's mother. The last residence of the family before deportation was in Kolín. On 13 June 1942 all four family members and his mother-in-law were arrested and deported from Kolín to Theresienstadt concentration camp with transport AAd. His transport number was 721 of 736. There they remained interned for 18 months. On 18 December 1943, they were all deported to Auschwitz extermination camp with transport Ds. His transport number was 1912 of 2,503. JUDr. Karel Ornstein, his wife and their 5-year-old daughter as well as his mother and his mother-in-law were murdered there by the Nazi regime.
	HERE LIVED; EVA ORNSTEINOVÁ; BORN 1938; DEPORTED 1942; TO THERESIENSTADT; MURDERED 18.12.1943; IN AUSCHWITZ	Karlovo náměstí 89; 50°01′42″N 15°12′03″E	Eva Ornsteinová was born on 11 July 1938. She was the daughter of JUDr. Karel Ornstein and Rita Ornsteinová. She grew up in Kolín with her parents and her grandmother Hermína Ornsteinová. On 13 June 1942 all four family members and her other grandmother, Marta Bauerová, were arrested and deported from Kolín to Theresienstadt concentration camp with transport AAd. Her transport number was 726 of 736. There they remained interned for 18 months. On 18 December 1943, they were deported to Auschwitz extermination camp with transport Ds. Her transport number was 1914 of 2,503. JUDr. The little girl was murdered there by the Nazi regime in one of the gas chambers, along with her mother. Also her father and both of her grandmothers lost their lives in Auschwitz.
	HERE LIVED; RITA ORNSTEINOVÁ; BORN 1913; DEPORTED 1942; TO THERESIENSTADT; MURDERED 18.12.1943; IN AUSCHWITZ	Karlovo náměstí 89; 50°01′42″N 15°12′03″E	Rita Ornsteinová née Bauer was born on 15 September 1913 in Kolín. Her parents were Ernest Bauer and Marta née Sandek (born on 2 May 1885). She had at least one brother, Francis. She was married to JUDr. Karel Ornstein. The couple had at least one daughter, Eva (born 1938), and they lived together with Karl Ornstein's mother, Hermína. The last residence of the family before deportation was in Kolín. On 13 June 1942, Rita Ornsteinová, her husband, her daughter, her mother and her mother-in-law were all arrested and deported from Kolín to Theresienstadt concentration camp with transport AAd. Her transport number was 721 of 736, her mother's was 669. There they remained interned for 18 months. On 18 December 1943, all five family members were deported to Auschwitz extermination camp with transport Ds. Her transport number was 1913 of 2,503, her mother's was 1891. JUDr. Rita Ornsteinová, her husband and their 5-year-old daughter as well as both grandmothers of the girl were murdered there by the Nazi regime. Her brother Francis could survive.
	HERE LIVED; HERMÍNA; ORNSTEINOVÁ; BORN 1880; DEPORTED 1942; TO THERESIENSTADT; MURDERED 18.12.1943; IN AUSCHWITZ	Karlovo náměstí 89; 50°01′42″N 15°12′03″E	Hermína Ornsteinová née Brod, also Hermine, was born 28 March 1880 in Dolní Bučice. Her parents were Alois Brod and Marie née Friedländer. She had four brothers. She was married to Dr. Josef Ornstein (born on 17 May 1863 in Hranice). The couple had one son, Karel (born on 27 August 1901). Their son studied law and married Rita née Bauer, the couple had a daughter named Eva (born 1938). Hermína Ornsteinová lived with the young couple in Kolín. On 13 June 1942, all family members and the mother of Rita were arrested and deported from Kolín to Theresienstadt concentration camp with transport AAd. Her transport number was 670 of 736. There they remained interned for 18 months. On 18 December 1943, all five family members were deported to Auschwitz extermination camp with transport Ds. Her transport number was 1947 of 2,503. Hermína Ornsteinová, her son, her daughter-in-law, their 5-year-old daughter as well as the other grandmother of the girl were all murdered there by the Nazi regime.
	HERE LIVED; EMILIE PICKOVÁ; BORN 1871; DEPORTED 1942; TO THERESIENSTADT; MURDERED 22.10.1942; IN TREBLINKA	Karlovo náměstí 7; 50°01′41″N 15°12′02″E	Emilie Picková was born on 16 October 1871. Her last residence before deportation was in Kolín. On 13 June 1942, she was arrested and deported from Kolín to Theresienstadt concentration camp with transport AAd. Her transport number was 185 of 736. Four months later, on 22 October 1942, she deported to Treblinka extermination camp with transport Bx. Her transport number was 1094 of 2,033. There she lost her live.
	HERE LIVED; LUDVÍK PREMSLER; BORN 1886; DEPORTED 1942; TO THERESIENSTADT; MURDERED; IN RAASIKU	Karlovo náměstí 9; 50°01′40″N 15°12′04″E	Ludvík Premsler was born on 27 February 1886. He was married to Ida. His last residence before deportation was in Kolín. On 9 June 1942, he and his wife were arrested and deported from Kolín to Theresienstadt concentration camp with transport AAc. Her transport number was 311 of 725. Three months later, on 1 September 1942, the couple were deported to Raasiku in Estonia with transport Be. Her transport number was 562 of 1,000. There both Ludvík Premsler and his wife lost their lives.
	HERE LIVED; IDA PREMSLEROVÁ; BORN 1889; DEPORTED 1942; TO THERESIENSTADT; MURDERED; IN RAASIKU	Karlovo náměstí 9; 50°01′40″N 15°12′04″E	Ida Premslerová was born on 12 January 1889. Her last residence before deportation was in Kolín. On 9 June 1942, she and her husband were arrested and deported from Kolín to Theresienstadt concentration camp with transport AAc. Her transport number was 312 of 725. Three months later, on 1 September 1942, the couple were deported to Raasiku in Estonia with transport Be. Her transport number was 563 of 1,000. There both Ida Premslerová and her husband lost their lives.
	HERE LIVED; RICHARD REICHNER; BORN 1865; DEPORTED 1942; TO THERESIENSTADT; MURDERED 31.7.1942	Na Hradbách 157; 50°01′40″N 15°11′57″E	Richard Reichner was born on 15 April 1865 in Kolín. He was married to Riva Reichnerová. On 13 June 1942, he and his wife were arrested and deported from Kolín to Theresienstadt concentration camp with transport AAd. His transport number was 24 of 736. On 31 July 1942 he was murdered there by the Nazi regime. On 15 December 1943, his wife was deported to Auschwitz concentration camp and murdered there.
	HERE LIVED; RIVA REICHNEROVÁ; BORN 1873; DEPORTED 1942; TO THERESIENSTADT; MURDERED; IN AUSCHWITZ	Na Hradbách 157; 50°01′40″N 15°11′57″E	Riva Reichnerová, also Riwa, was born on 25 December 1873 in Kolín. She was married to Richard Reichner. On 13 June 1942, she was arrested and deported from Kolín to Theresienstadt concentration camp with transport AAd. Her transport number was 25 of 736. There her husband was brought to death by the Nazi regime on 31 July 1942. Seventeen months later, on 15 December 1943, Riva Reichnerová was deported to Auschwitz concentration camp with transport Dr. Her transport number was 1727 of 2,519. There she was murdered.
	HERE LIVED; OTA STEIN; BORN 1890; DEPORTED 1942; TO THERESIENSTADT; MURDERED; IN RAASIKU	Zámecká ulice 88; 50°01′44″N 15°12′01″E	Ota Stein was born 23 September 1887. His last residence before deportation was in Ledečko in Uhlířské Janovice. He and Marta Steinová were lived in the same building, probably as a married couple or as siblings. On 5 June 1942, he and Marta Steinová were arrested and deported from Kolín to Theresienstadt concentration camp by transport AAb. Their transport numbers were 483 and 484 of 745. Fifteen months later, on 6 September 1943, both were deported to Auschwitz concentration camp with transport Dl. Their transport numbers were 2089 and 2090 of 2,484. Both were murdered there by the Nazi regime.
	HERE LIVED; MARTA STEINOVÁ; BORN 1886; DEPORTED 1942; TO THERESIENSTADT; MURDERED; IN AUSCHWITZ	Zámecká ulice 88; 50°01′44″N 15°12′01″E	Marta Steinová was born on 19 May 1886. Her last residence before deportation was in Ledečko in Uhlířské Janovice. She and Ota Stein were lived in the same building, probably as a married couple or as siblings. On 5 June 1942, she and Ota Stein were arrested and deported from Kolín to Theresienstadt concentration camp by transport AAb. Their transport numbers were 483 and 484 of 745. Fifteen months later, on 6 September 1943, both were deported to Auschwitz concentration camp with transport Dl. Their transport numbers were 2089 and 2090 of 2,484. Both were murdered there by the Nazi regime.
	HERE LIVED; HERMÍNA; WEINEROVÁ; BORN 1875; DEPORTED 1942; TO THERESIENSTADT; MURDERED 11.1.1943	Husova 49; 50°01′41″N 15°12′11″E	Hermína Weinerováwas born in 1872. She lived in the same building as Žofie Weissbergerová. On 13 June 1942, she and Weissbergerová were arrested and deported from Kolín to Theresienstadt concentration camp with transport AAd. Her transport number was 81 of 736. Hermína Weinerová was brought to death there by the Nazi regime on 15 October 1942, according to the death certificate of the Nazi doctors, or on 11 January 1943, according to Yad Vashem and holocaust.cz.
	HERE LIVED; ŽOFIE; WEISSBERGEROVÁ; BORN 1872; DEPORTED 1942; TO THERESIENSTADT; MURDERED; IN TREBLINKA	Husova 49; 50°01′41″N 15°12′11″E	Žofie Weissbergerová was born on 28 April 1872. She lived in the same building as Hermína Weinerová. On 13 June 1942, she and Weinerová were arrested and deported from Kolín to Theresienstadt concentration camp with transport AAd. Her transport number was 80 of 736. Hermína Weinerová was brought to death there by the Nazi regime on 15 October 1942, according to the death certificate of the Nazi doctors. On the same day, Žofie Weissbergerová was deported to Treblinka extermination camp with transport Bv. Her transport number was 1250 of 2,000. Not one Jew from this transport survived the Shoah.

== Dates of collocations ==
The Stolpersteine in Kolín were collocated by the artist himself on the following dates:

- 10 October 2008
- 6 November 2009

The Czech Stolperstein project was initiated in 2008 by the Česká unie židovské mládeže (Czech Union of Jewish Youth) and was realized with the patronage of the Mayor of Prague.

== See also ==
- List of places with Stolpersteine
