= Čejkovice (Kutná Hora District) =

- Municipality
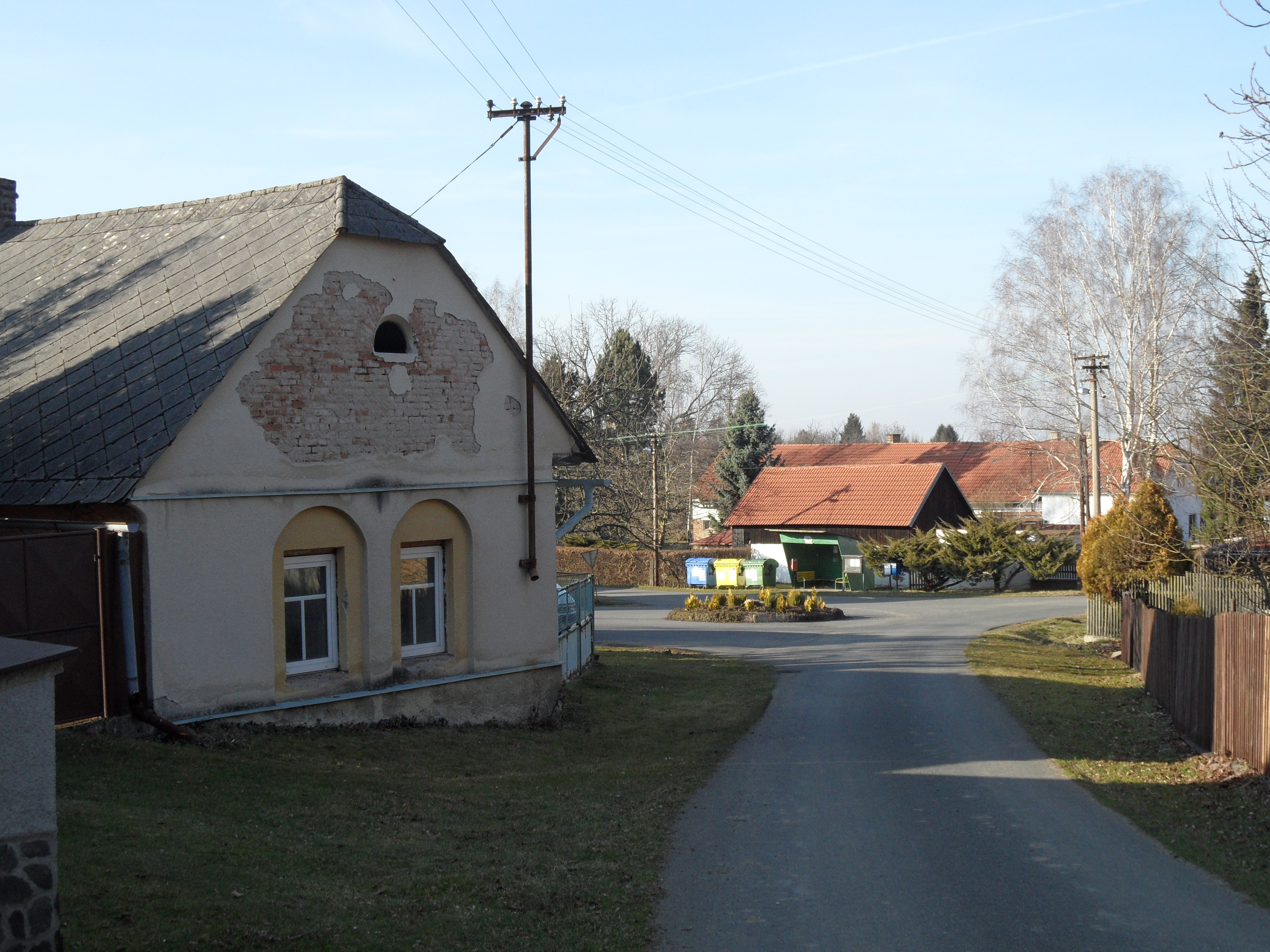
- Centre of Čejkovice

- Location in the Czech Republic
- Coordinates: 49°47′31″N 15°20′59″E
- Country: Czech Republic
- Region: Central Bohemian
- District: Kutná Hora
- First mentioned: 1360

Area
  - Total: 1.95 km^{2} (0.75 sq mi)
- Elevation: 452 m (1,483 ft)

Population (2026-01-01)
  - Total: 28
  - Density: 14/km^{2} (37/sq mi)
- Time zone: UTC+1 (CET)
  - Summer (DST): UTC+2 (CEST)
- Postal code: 286 01
- Website: cejkovice-caslav.cz

Čejkovice is a municipality and village in Kutná Hora District in the Central Bohemian Region of the Czech Republic. It has about 30 inhabitants.

== Etymology ==
The name is derived from the personal name Čejka, meaning "the village of Čejka's people".

== Geography ==
Čejkovice is located about 18 kilometres (11 mi) south of Kutná Hora and 65 km (40 mi) southeast of Prague. It lies in a predominantly agricultural landscape in the Upper Sázava Hills. The highest point is at 486 m (1,594 ft) above sea level. The Klejnárka River flows through the municipality.

== History ==
The first written mention of Čejkovice is from 1360, when it was part of the Chlum estate, which was owned by the Sázava Monastery. From 1463, the estate was a property of the Slavata of Chlum and Košumberk noble family, which ruled it for almost 200 years. During the Thirty Years' War, Čejkovice was completely looted.

== Demographics ==
Historical population

| Year | Pop. | ±% |
|---|---|---|
| 1869 | 254 | — |
| 1880 | 234 | −7.9% |
| 1890 | 206 | −12.0% |
| 1900 | 179 | −13.1% |
| 1910 | 152 | −15.1% |

| Year | Pop. | ±% |
|---|---|---|
| 1921 | 154 | +1.3% |
| 1930 | 125 | −18.8% |
| 1950 | 101 | −19.2% |
| 1961 | 80 | −20.8% |
| 1970 | 72 | −10.0% |

| Year | Pop. | ±% |
|---|---|---|
| 1980 | 57 | −20.8% |
| 1991 | 39 | −31.6% |
| 2001 | 35 | −10.3% |
| 2011 | 34 | −2.9% |
| 2021 | 33 | −2.9% |

Source: Censuses

== Transport ==
There are no railways or major roads passing through the municipality.

== Sights ==
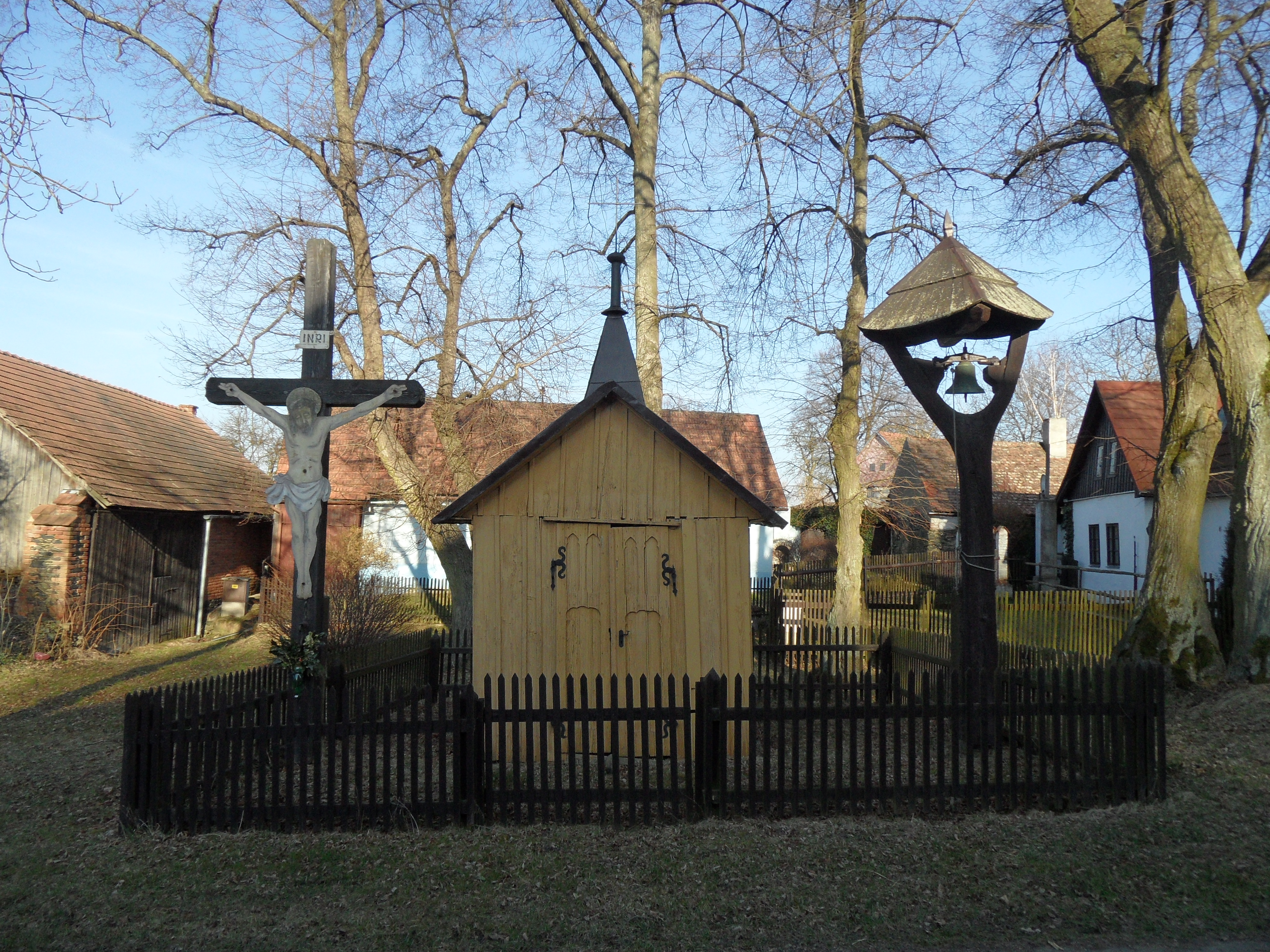
Chapel with a crucifix and belfry

There are two protected cultural monuments in the municipality: a former wooden smithy from the first half of the 19th century, and a set of a chapel from 1898 with a belfry from 1922 and with a wooden crucifix from the 19th century.
