= Klejnárka =

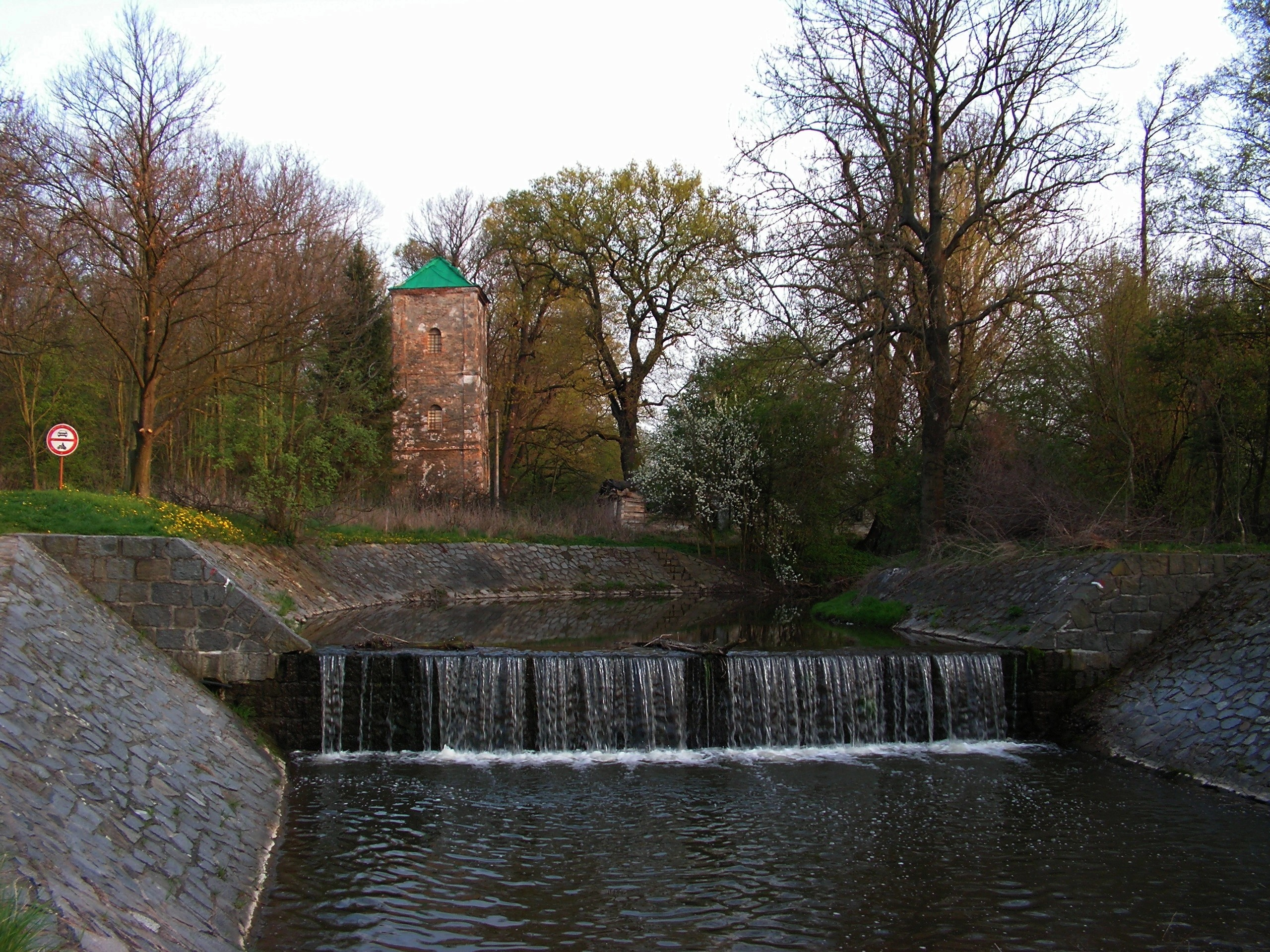
- The Klejnárka in Nové Dvory

Location
- Country: Czech Republic
- Region: Central Bohemian

Physical characteristics
- Source
  - location: Dobrovítov, Upper Sázava Hills
  - coordinates: 49°46′48″N 15°18′58″E
  - elevation: 517 m (1,696 ft)
- Mouth
  - location: Elbe
  - coordinates: 50°1′13″N 15°16′24″E
  - elevation: 193 m (633 ft)
- Length: 40.3 km (25.0 mi)
- Basin size: 350.0 km^{2} (135.1 sq mi)
- Discharge
  - average: 1.32 m^{3}/s (47 cu ft/s) near estuary

Basin features
- Progression: Elbe→ North Sea

The Klejnárka is a river in the Czech Republic, a left tributary of the Elbe River. It flows through the Central Bohemian Region. It is 40.3 km (25.0 mi) long.

== Characteristic ==
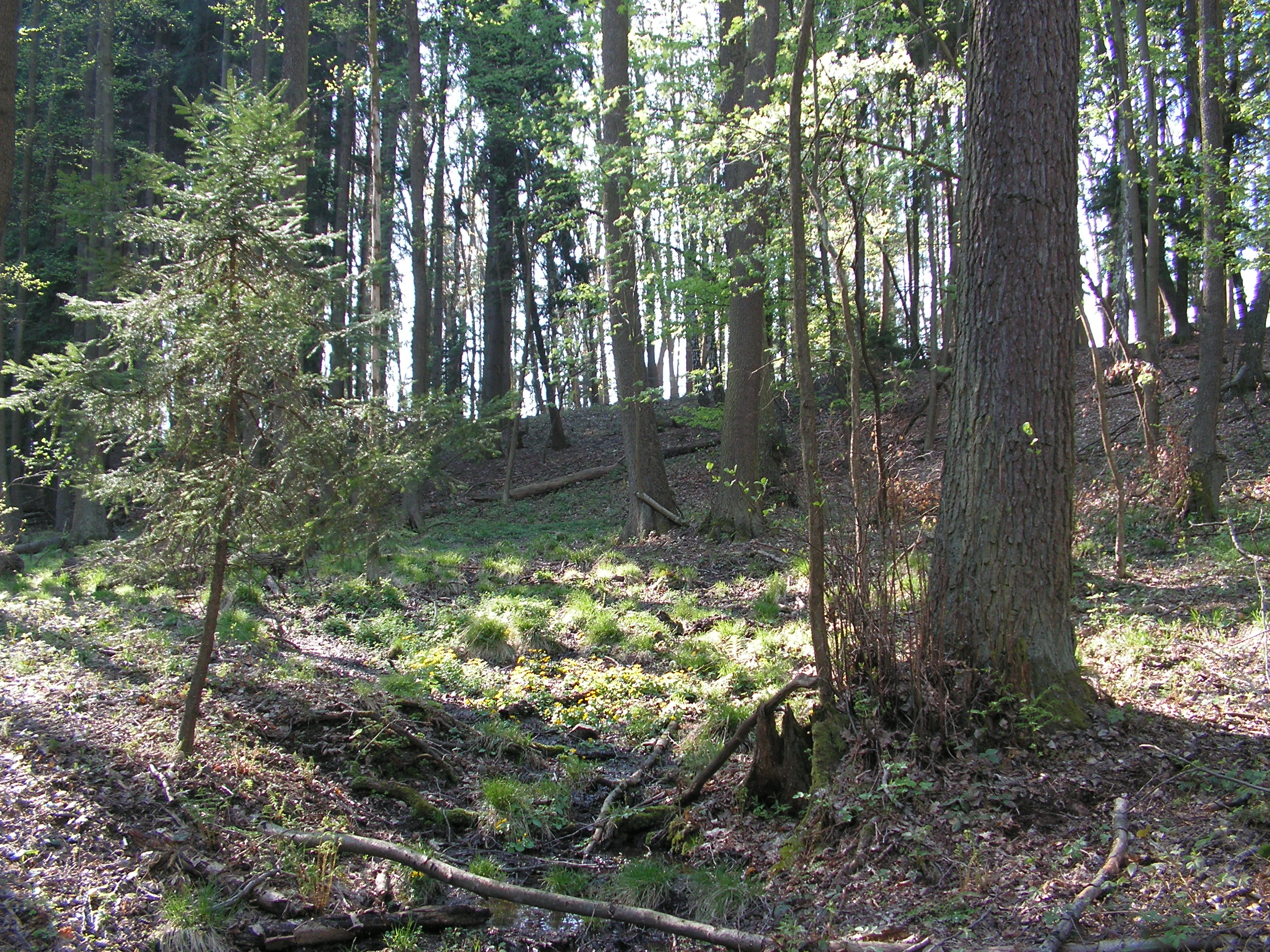
Spring of the Klejnárka

The Klejnárka originates in the territory of Dobrovítov in the Upper Sázava Hills at an elevation of 517 m (1,696 ft) and flows to Konárovice, where it enters the Elbe River at an elevation of 193 m (633 ft). It is 40.3 km (25.0 mi) long. Its drainage basin has an area of 350.0 km^{2} (135.1 sq mi).

The longest tributaries of the Klejnárka are:

Tributary	Length (km)	River km	Side
Vrchlice	30.0	7.5	left
Paběnický potok	13.9	23.9	left
Medenický potok	12.5	22.3	left
Vranidolský potok	11.5	30.4	right
Černá struha	10.9	1.5	right

== Course ==
The Klejnárka does not flow through any significant settlement, it only briefly crosses the territory of Čáslav. The river flows northward through the municipal territories of Dobrovítov, Čejkovice, Zbýšov, Hraběšín, Krchleby, Vodranty, Močovice, Čáslav, Třebešice, Církvice, Nové Dvory, Hlízov, Starý Kolín and Konárovice.

== Bodies of water ==
There are 395 bodies of water in the basin area. The largest of them is the Vrchlice Reservoir with an area of 87.6 ha (216 acres), built on the Vrchlice. A system of ponds is built on the upper course of the Klejnárka. The largest of them is Zbýšovský Pond with an area of 10.6 ha (26 acres).

== Protection of nature ==
On the upper course of the river near the source, the Jánský potok Nature Monument was declared. It has an area of 4.2 ha (10 acres). The reason for protection is a set of water and meadow ecosystems with the occurrence of common minnow and other protected species of plants and animals.

== See also ==
- List of rivers of the Czech Republic
