= Močovice =

- Municipality
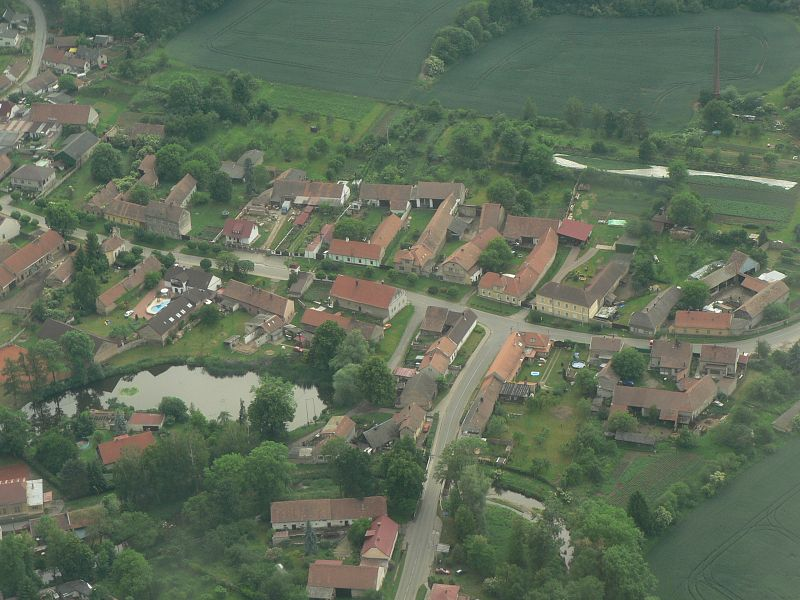
- Aerial view of Močovice

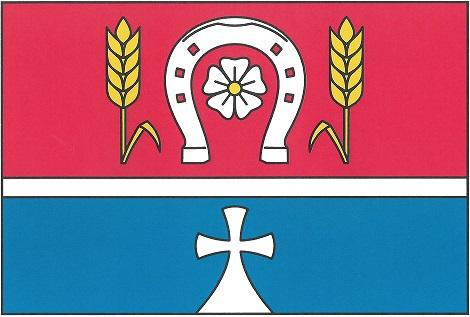
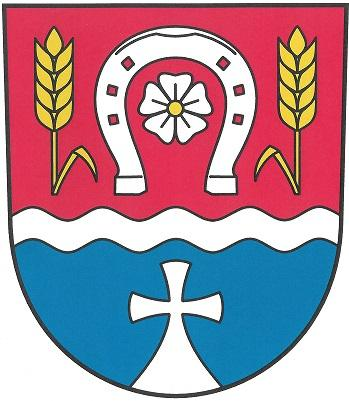
- Flag Coat of arms

- Location in the Czech Republic
- Coordinates: 49°54′23″N 15°20′54″E
- Country: Czech Republic
- Region: Central Bohemian
- District: Kutná Hora
- First mentioned: 1324

Area
  - Total: 4.90 km^{2} (1.89 sq mi)
- Elevation: 242 m (794 ft)

Population (2026-01-01)
  - Total: 406
  - Density: 82.9/km^{2} (215/sq mi)
- Time zone: UTC+1 (CET)
  - Summer (DST): UTC+2 (CEST)
- Postal code: 286 01
- Website: www.mocovice.cz

Močovice is a municipality and village in Kutná Hora District in the Central Bohemian Region of the Czech Republic. It has about 400 inhabitants.

== Etymology ==
The name is derived from the personal name Moč, meaning "the village of Moč's people". The personal name was derived from the German name Motz, which was a dialectical shortened form of Mathias.

== Geography ==
Močovice is located about 7 kilometres (4 mi) southeast of Kutná Hora and 61 km (38 mi) east of Prague. It lies in a flat agricultural landscape in the Central Elbe Table. The Klejnárka River flows through the municipality.

== History ==
The first written mention of Močovice is from 1324.

== Demographics ==
Historical population

Year	Pop.	±%
1869	500	—
1880	594	+18.8%
1890	663	+11.6%
1900	663	+0.0%
1910	751	+13.3%

Year	Pop.	±%
1921	759	+1.1%
1930	717	−5.5%
1950	520	−27.5%
1961	447	−14.0%
1970	410	−8.3%

Year	Pop.	±%
1980	363	−11.5%
1991	340	−6.3%
2001	346	+1.8%
2011	347	+0.3%
2021	390	+12.4%

Source: Censuses

== Transport ==
There are no railways or major roads passing through the municipality.

== Sights ==
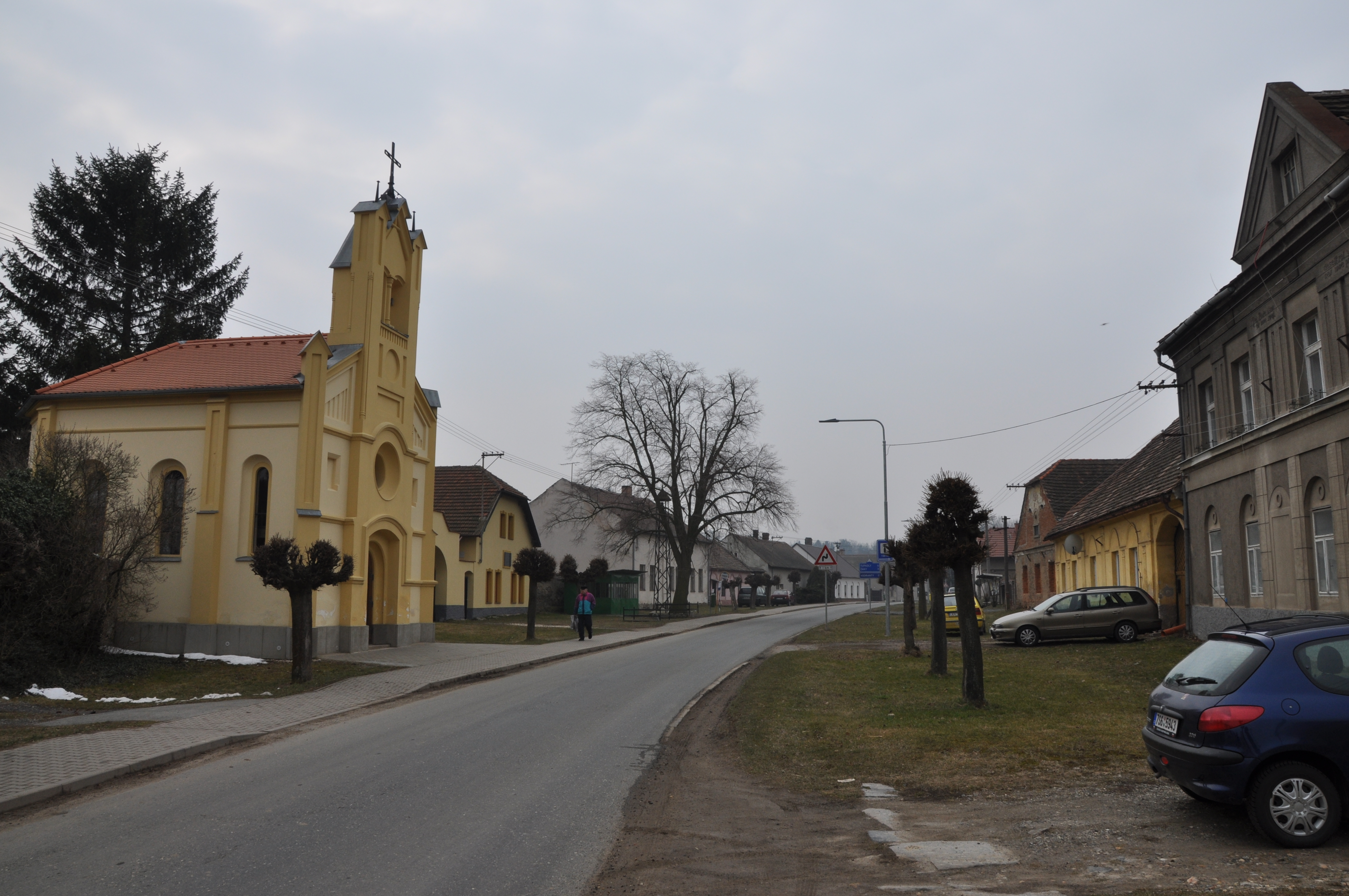
Chapel of the Visitation

The only protected cultural monument in the municipality is a Neoclassical homestead from the first half of the 19th century.

A landmark in the centre of Močovice is the Chapel of the Visitation. It was built in the Neoclassical style in 1831.
