= Dobrovítov =

- Municipality
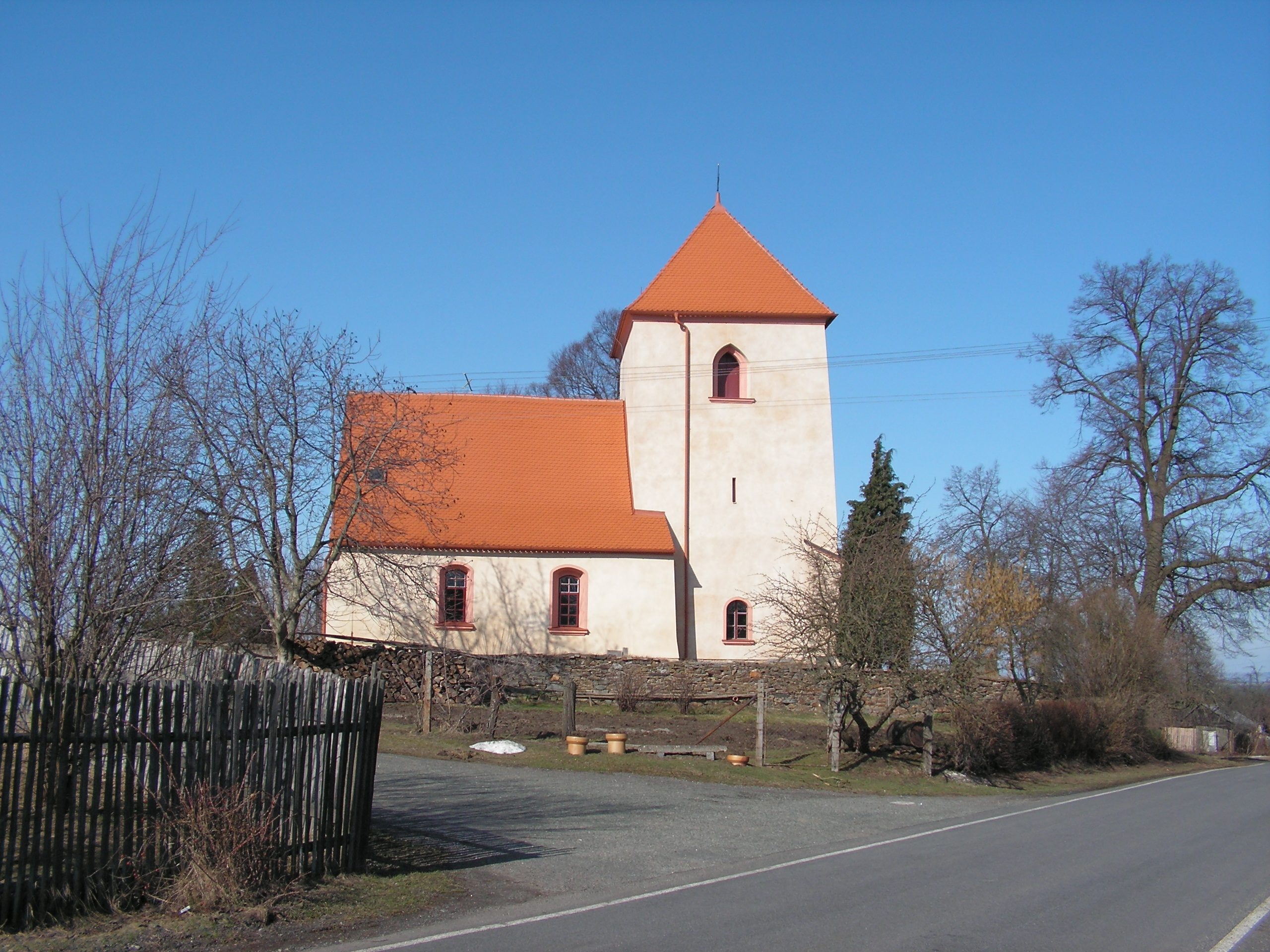
- Church of Saint Wenceslaus

- Location in the Czech Republic
- Coordinates: 49°47′15″N 15°19′44″E
- Country: Czech Republic
- Region: Central Bohemian
- District: Kutná Hora
- First mentioned: 1355

Area
  - Total: 9.01 km^{2} (3.48 sq mi)
- Elevation: 487 m (1,598 ft)

Population (2026-01-01)
  - Total: 133
  - Density: 14.8/km^{2} (38.2/sq mi)
- Time zone: UTC+1 (CET)
  - Summer (DST): UTC+2 (CEST)
- Postal code: 286 01
- Website: www.dobrovitov.cz

Dobrovítov is a municipality and village in Kutná Hora District in the Central Bohemian Region of the Czech Republic. It has about 100 inhabitants.

== Administrative division ==
Dobrovítov consists of two municipal parts (in brackets population according to the 2021 census):

- Dobrovítov (100)
- Dědice (18)

== Etymology ==
The name Dobrovítov is derived from the personal name Dobrovít, meaning "Dobrovít's (court)".

== Geography ==
Dobrovítov is located about 19 kilometres (12 mi) south of Kutná Hora and 64 km (40 mi) southeast of Prague. It lies in the Upper Sázava Hills. The highest point is at 551 m (1,808 ft) above sea level. The Klejnárka River flows through the municipality.

== History ==
The first written mention of Dobrovítov is from 1355.

== Demographics ==
Historical population

Year	Pop.	±%
1869	587	—
1880	554	−5.6%
1890	521	−6.0%
1900	492	−5.6%
1910	436	−11.4%

Year	Pop.	±%
1921	429	−1.6%
1930	401	−6.5%
1950	260	−35.2%
1961	278	+6.9%
1970	246	−11.5%

Year	Pop.	±%
1980	183	−25.6%
1991	138	−24.6%
2001	128	−7.2%
2011	116	−9.4%
2021	118	+1.7%

Source: Censuses

== Transport ==
There are no railways or major roads passing through the municipality.

== Sights ==
The main landmark of Dobrovítov is the Church of Saint Wenceslaus. It was probably founded at the beginning of the 14th century. The Renaissance tower was added after 1581. Further modifications were made after 1720.
