= Hraběšín =

- Municipality
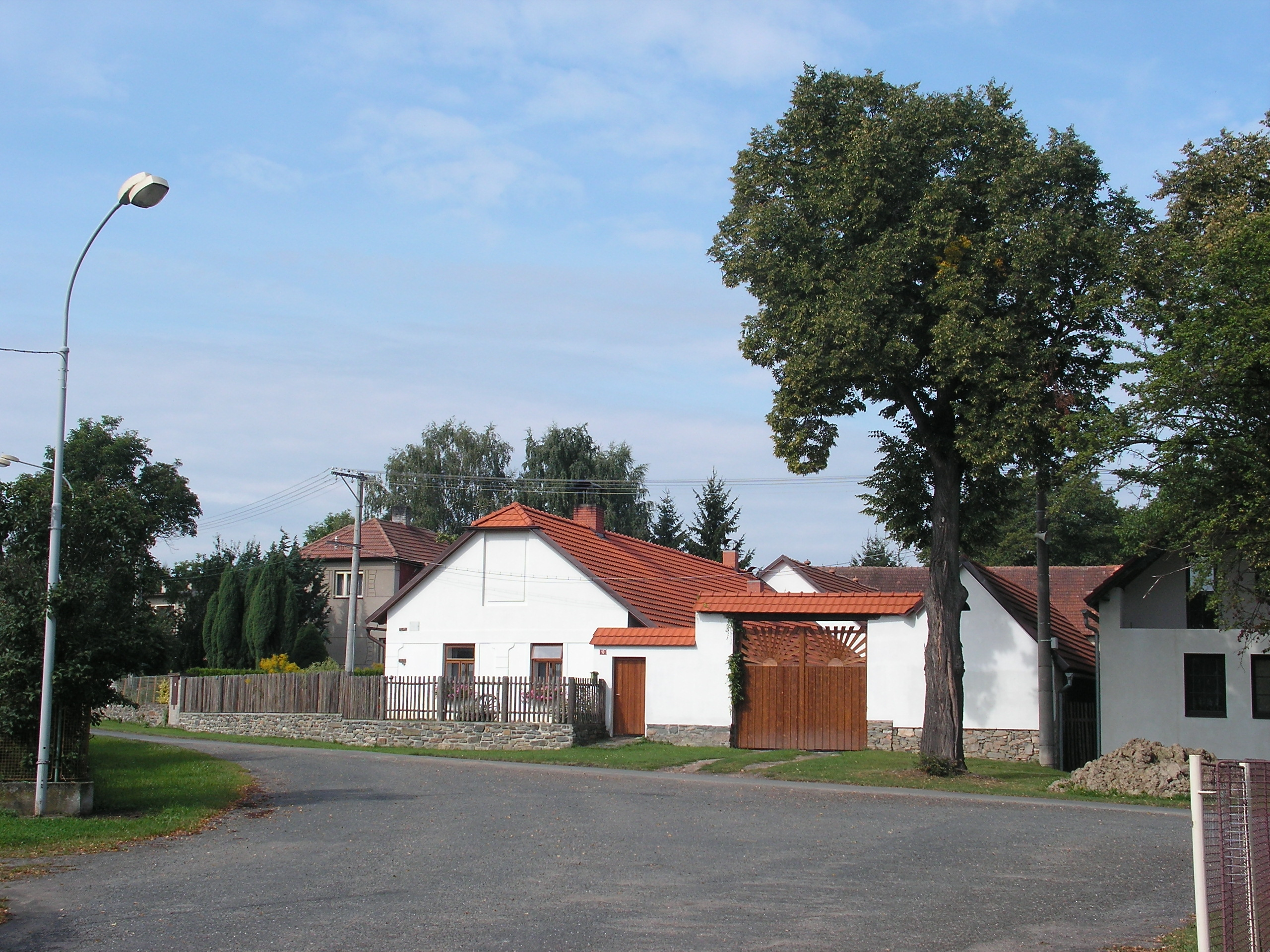
- Centre of Hraběšín

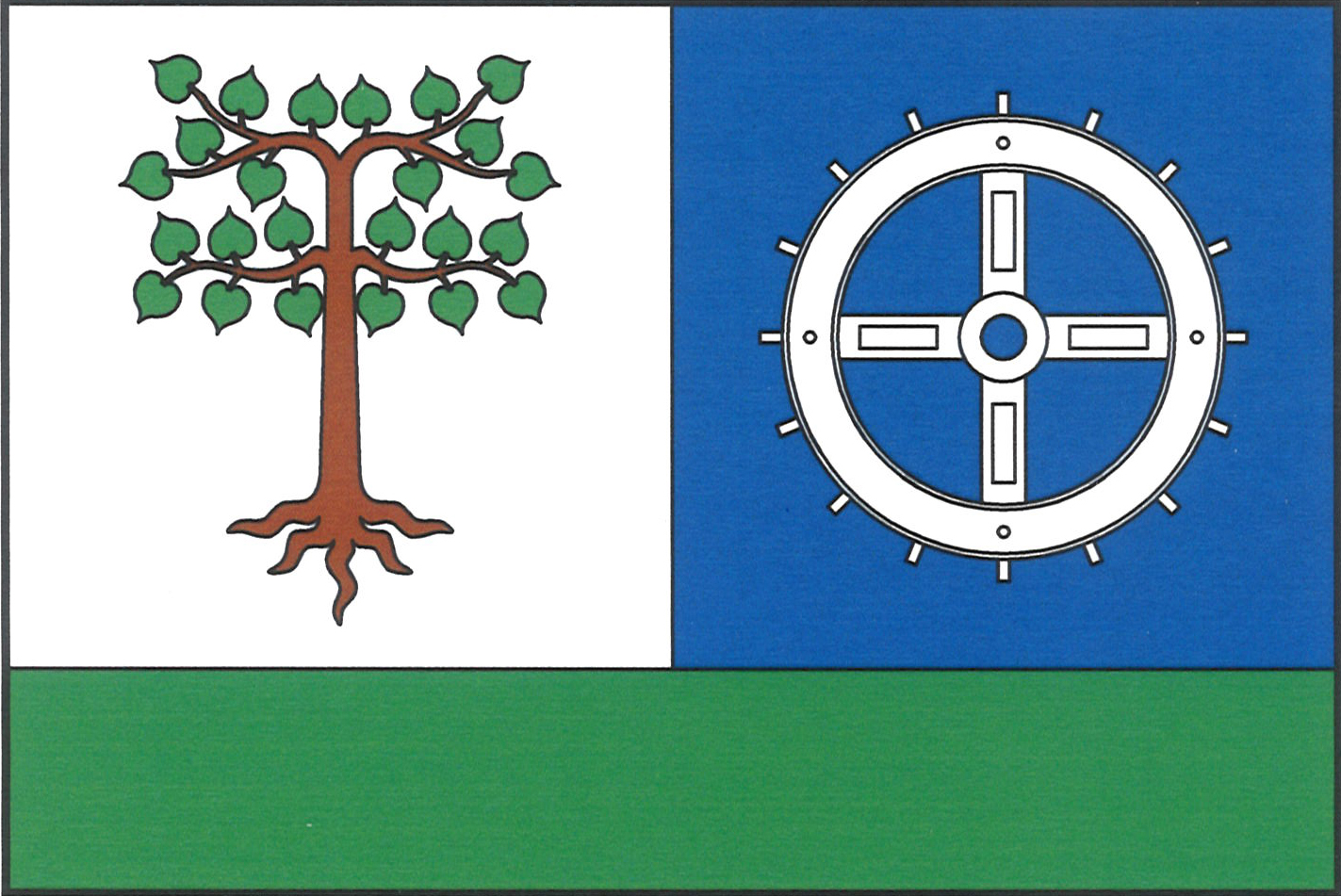
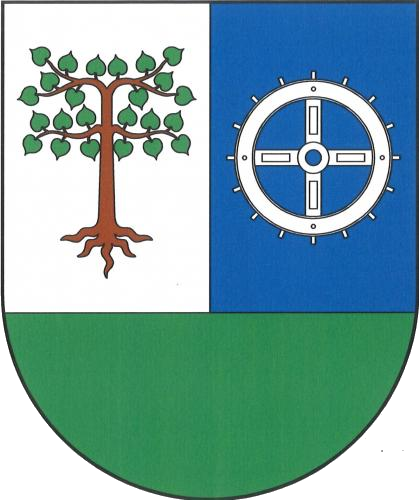
- Flag Coat of arms

- Location in the Czech Republic
- Coordinates: 49°51′9″N 15°19′55″E
- Country: Czech Republic
- Region: Central Bohemian
- District: Kutná Hora
- First mentioned: 1379

Area
  - Total: 7.92 km^{2} (3.06 sq mi)
- Elevation: 358 m (1,175 ft)

Population (2026-01-01)
  - Total: 113
  - Density: 14.3/km^{2} (37.0/sq mi)
- Time zone: UTC+1 (CET)
  - Summer (DST): UTC+2 (CEST)
- Postal code: 286 01
- Website: www.hrabesin.cz

Hraběšín is a municipality and village in Kutná Hora District in the Central Bohemian Region of the Czech Republic. It has about 100 inhabitants.

== Etymology ==
The initial name of the village was Hrabišín. The name was derived from the personal name Hrabiše, meaning "Hrabiše's (court)". The form Hraběšín first appeared in the second half of the 15th century.

== Geography ==
Hraběšín is located about 11 kilometres (7 mi) south of Kutná Hora and 58 km (36 mi) southeast of Prague. It lies in the Upper Sázava Hills. The highest point is at 390 m (1,280 ft) above sea level. The municipality is situated between the stream Paběnický potok and the Klejnárka River, which form the western and eastern municipal border. A nameles brook supplies two small fishponds in the centre of the village.

== History ==
The village was founded in the 14th century and named after the nobleman Hrabiše of Paběnice. The first written mention of Hraběšín is from 1379. From 1658 to 1783, it was owned by the Sedlec Abbey. In 1819, it was acquired by the Schwarzenberg family.

== Demographics ==
Historical population

Year	Pop.	±%
1869	646	—
1880	634	−1.9%
1890	480	−24.3%
1900	457	−4.8%
1910	418	−8.5%

Year	Pop.	±%
1921	494	+18.2%
1930	345	−30.2%
1950	290	−15.9%
1961	219	−24.5%
1970	193	−11.9%

Year	Pop.	±%
1980	177	−8.3%
1991	137	−22.6%
2001	122	−10.9%
2011	100	−18.0%
2021	103	+3.0%

Source: Censuses

== Transport ==
There are no railways or major roads passing through the municipality.

== Sights ==
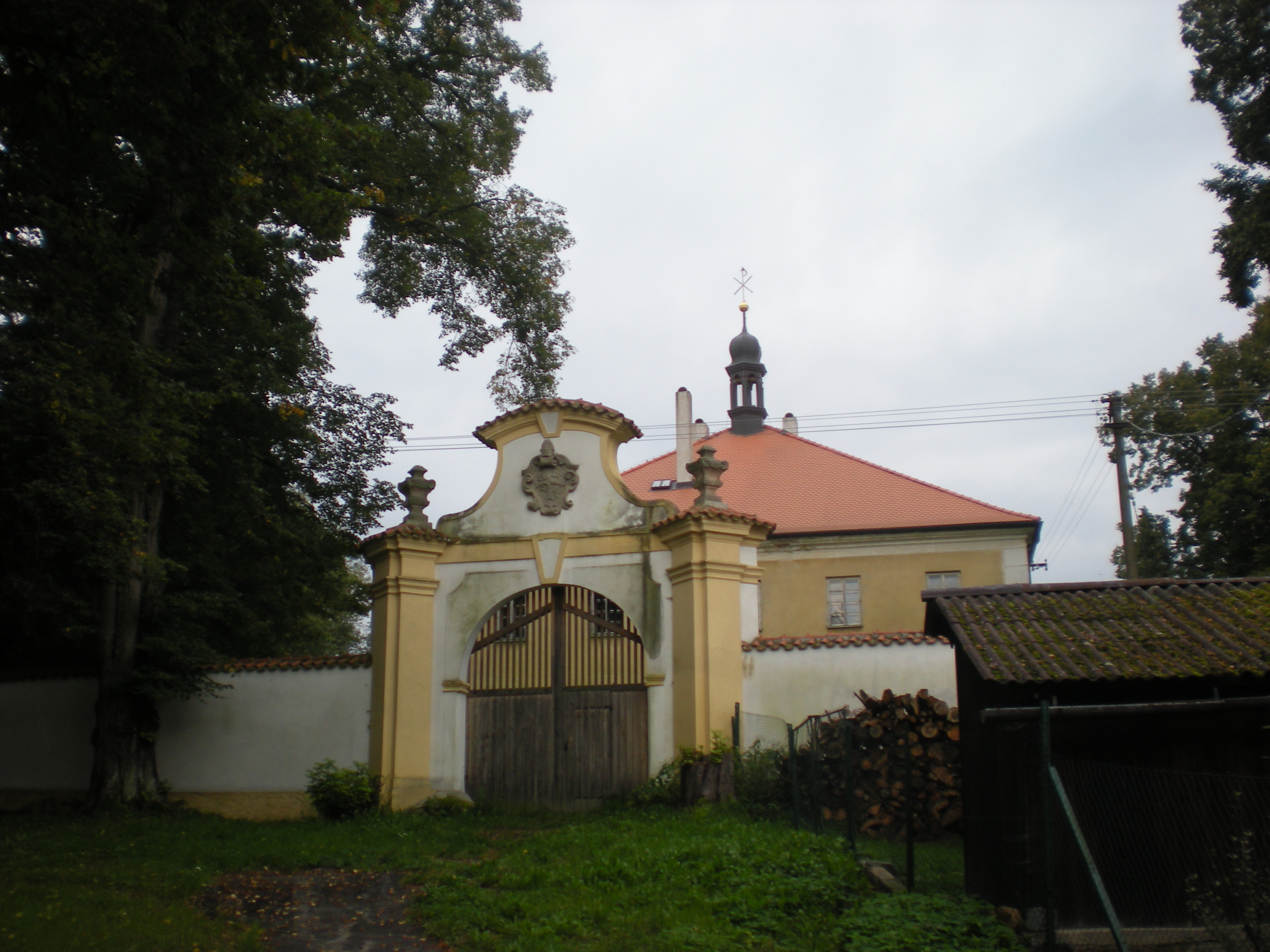
Hraběšice Castle

The main landmark is the Hraběšice Castle. The Baroque castle complex includes the castle, a chapel, and outbuildings, surrounded by a wall. The castle was built in the early 17th century, and completely rebuilt in the 1740s. The Chapel of Saint Florian and outbuildings were added in the first half of the 19th century. In 1992, the castle was returned in restitution to Karel Schwarzenberg.
