= Církvice (Kutná Hora District) =

- Municipality
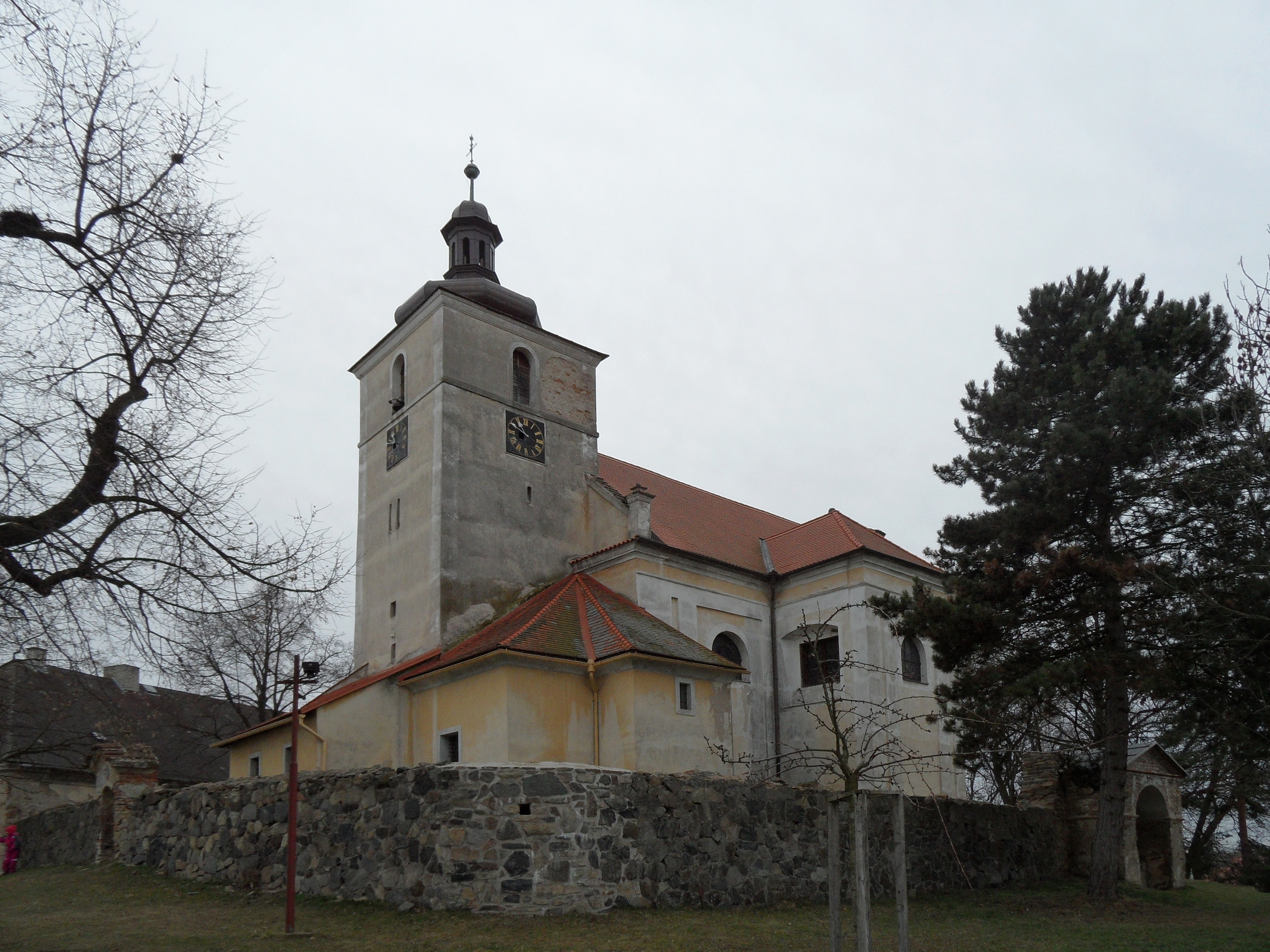
- Church of Saint Lawrence

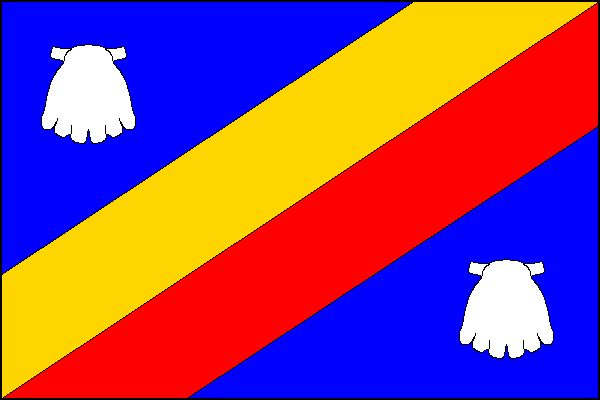
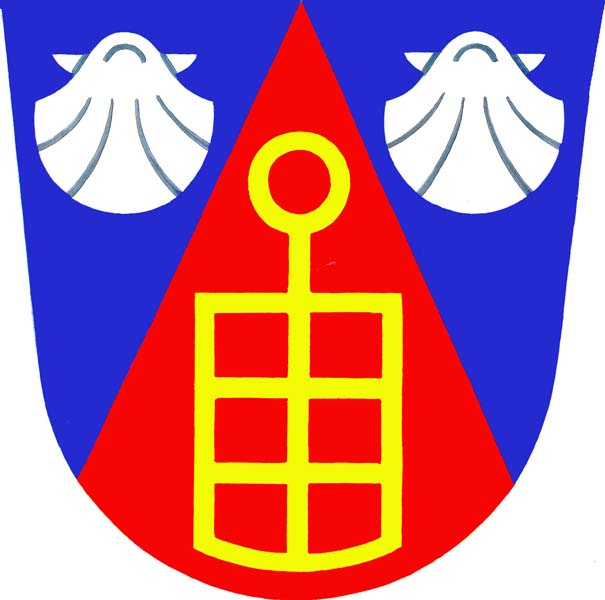
- Flag Coat of arms

- Location in the Czech Republic
- Coordinates: 49°56′44″N 15°20′6″E
- Country: Czech Republic
- Region: Central Bohemian
- District: Kutná Hora
- First mentioned: 1276

Area
  - Total: 10.12 km^{2} (3.91 sq mi)
- Elevation: 214 m (702 ft)

Population (2026-01-01)
  - Total: 1,350
  - Density: 133/km^{2} (346/sq mi)
- Time zone: UTC+1 (CET)
  - Summer (DST): UTC+2 (CEST)
- Postal code: 285 33
- Website: www.cirkvice.cz

Církvice is a municipality and village in Kutná Hora District in the Central Bohemian Region of the Czech Republic. It has about 1,400 inhabitants. The village of Jakub in the municipality is known for the Church of Saint James the Great, which is one of the most valuable Romanesque buildings in the country and a national cultural monument.

== Administrative division ==
Církvice consists of two municipal parts (in brackets population according to the 2021 census):

- Církvice (630)
- Jakub (628)

== Etymology ==
The name is derived from cierkev, which was an Old Czech term for a wooden church.

== Geography ==
Církvice is located about 5 kilometres (3 mi) east of Kutná Hora and 32 km (20 mi) west of Pardubice. The villages of Církvice and Jakub are urbanistically merged. The municipality lies in a flat agricultural landscape in the Central Elbe Table. The Klejnárka River flows through the municipality. There are several fishponds around the villages.

== History ==
The first written mention of Církvice is from 1276.

== Demographics ==
Historical population

Year	Pop.	±%
1869	1,349	—
1880	1,355	+0.4%
1890	1,347	−0.6%
1900	1,418	+5.3%
1910	1,367	−3.6%

Year	Pop.	±%
1921	1,332	−2.6%
1930	1,231	−7.6%
1950	1,079	−12.3%
1961	1,185	+9.8%
1970	1,170	−1.3%

Year	Pop.	±%
1980	1,099	−6.1%
1991	1,073	−2.4%
2001	1,151	+7.3%
2011	1,183	+2.8%
2021	1,258	+6.3%

Source: Censuses

== Transport ==
The I/38 road from Jihlava to Kolín runs through the municipality.

Církvice is located on the railway line leading from Kolín to Havlíčkův Brod.

== Sights ==
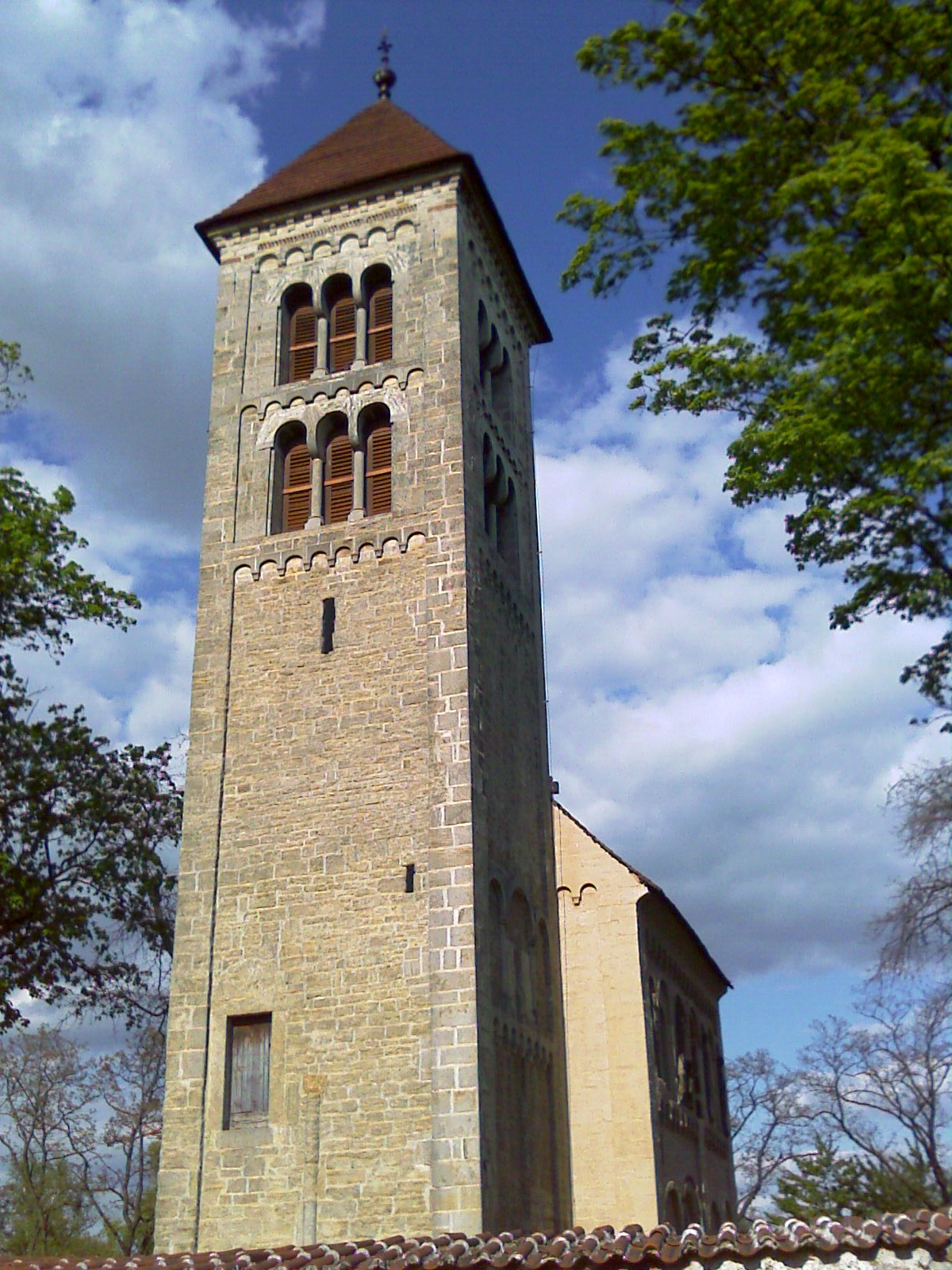
Church of Saint James the Great

The Church of Saint James the Great in Jakub is one of the most important Romanesque buildings in the country, protected as a national cultural monument. This church was built between 1148 and 1165. Several reconstructions and modifications were made, but in 1872–1874 the church was cleaned of these reconstructions and its purely Romanesque character was restored. The preserved sculptural decoration is also unique and very valuable.

The Church of Saint Lawrence in Církvice was probably built at the end of the 13th century and was first documented in 1352. In the second half of the 17th century, the original Gothic building was rebuilt in the Baroque style. Valuable is also the early Baroque rectory.
