= Zbýšov (Kutná Hora District) =

Municipality in Central Bohemian Region

- Municipality
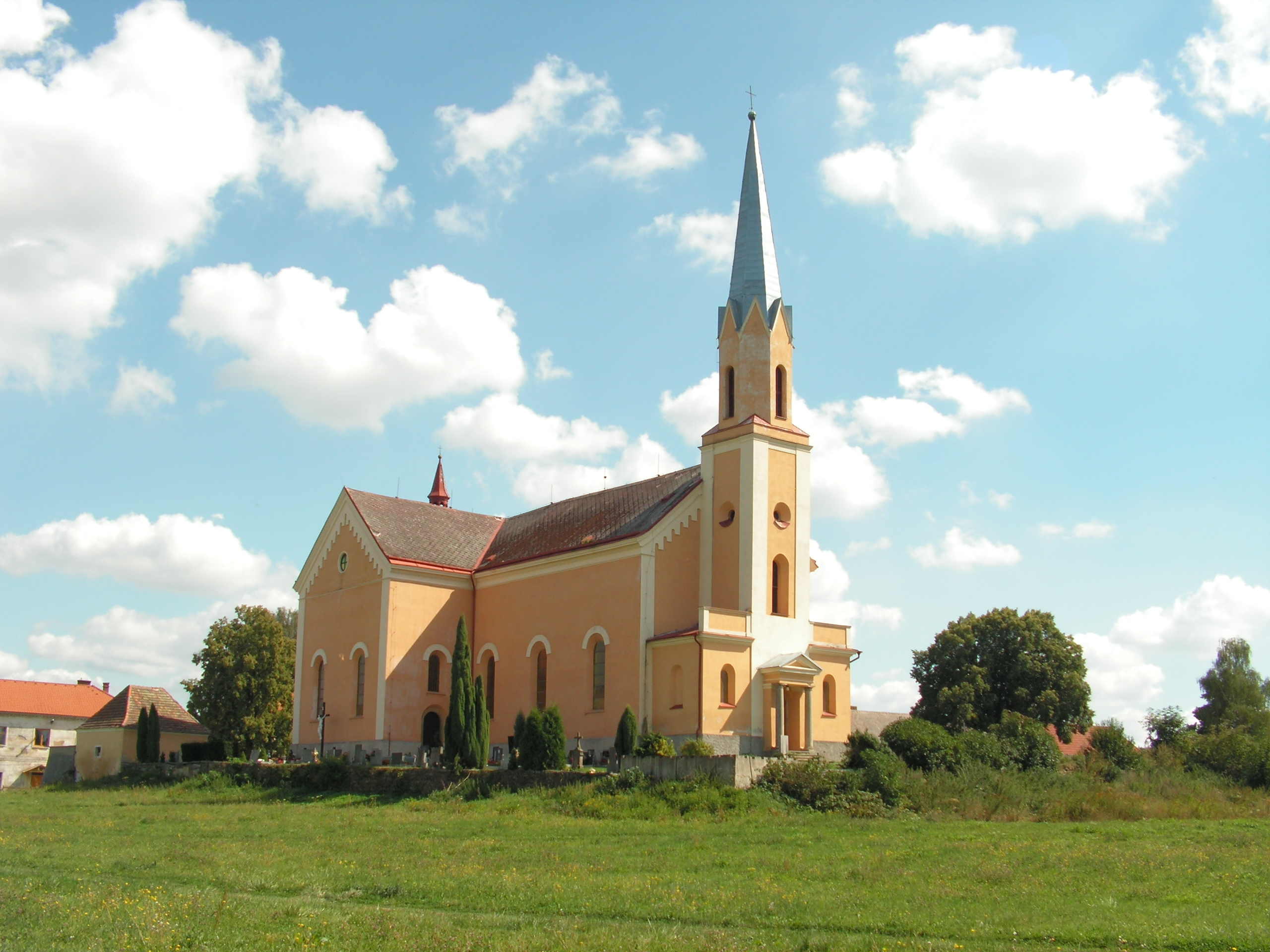
- Church of The Nativity of Saint John the Baptist

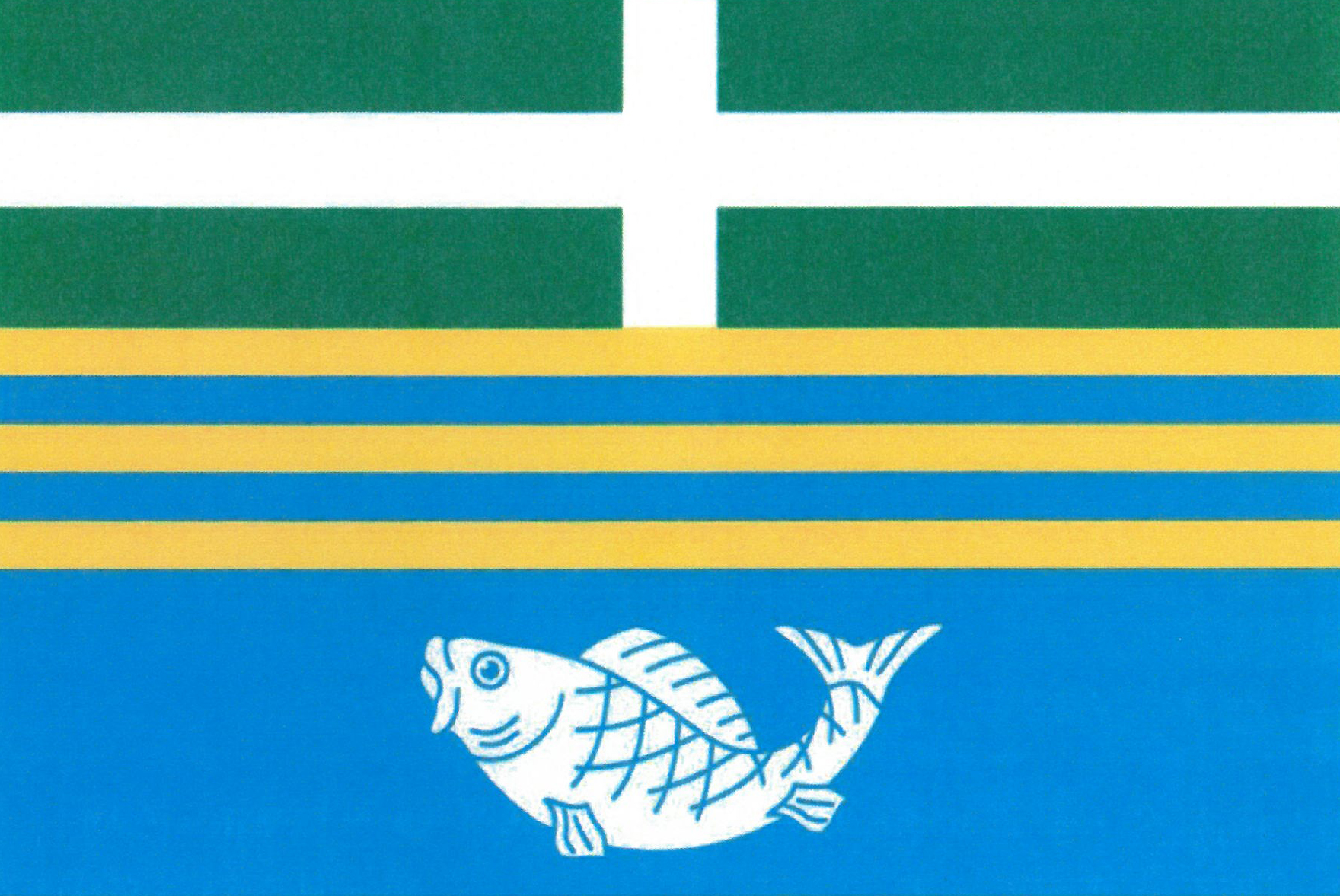
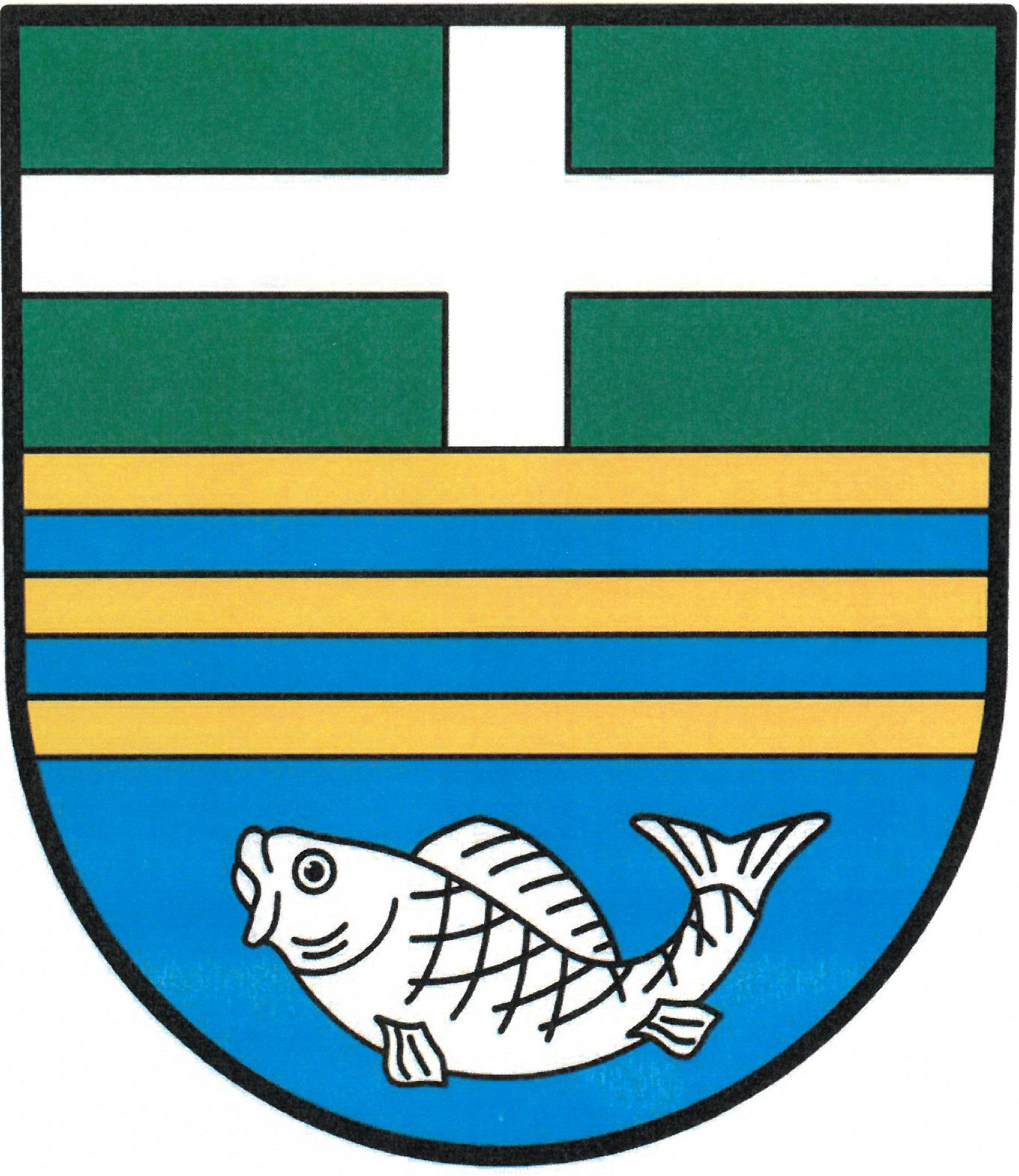
- Flag Coat of arms

- Location in the Czech Republic
- Coordinates: 49°48′42″N 15°21′11″E
- Country: Czech Republic
- Region: Central Bohemian
- District: Kutná Hora
- First mentioned: 1257

Area
  - Total: 26.15 km^{2} (10.10 sq mi)
- Elevation: 394 m (1,293 ft)

Population (2026-01-01)
  - Total: 600
  - Density: 23/km^{2} (59/sq mi)
- Time zone: UTC+1 (CET)
  - Summer (DST): UTC+2 (CEST)
- Postal code: 286 01
- Website: www.zbysovvcechach.cz

Zbýšov is a municipality and village in Kutná Hora District in the Central Bohemian Region of the Czech Republic. It has about 600 inhabitants.

== Administrative division ==
Zbýšov consists of eight municipal parts (in brackets population according to the 2021 census):

- Zbýšov (226)
- Březí (63)
- Chlum (41)
- Damírov (44)
- Klucké Chvalovice (105)
- Krchlebská Lhota (27)
- Opatovice (69)
- Zbudovice (25)

== Etymology ==
The name is derived from the personal name Zbýš, meaning Zbýš's (court)".

== Geography ==
Zbýšov is located about 16 kilometres (10 mi) south of Kutná Hora and 38 km (24 mi) southwest of Pardubice. It lies in the Upper Sázava Hills. The highest point is at 505 m (1,657 ft) above sea level.

The upper course of the Klejnárka River flows through the municipality. Zbýšov is known for the fishpond Zbýšovský rybník, used for swimming and fishing.

== History ==
The first written mention of Zbýšov is from 1257.

== Demographics ==
Historical population

Year	Pop.	±%
1869	1,835	—
1880	1,889	+2.9%
1890	1,652	−12.5%
1900	1,634	−1.1%
1910	1,680	+2.8%

Year	Pop.	±%
1921	1,572	−6.4%
1930	1,445	−8.1%
1950	1,147	−20.6%
1961	1,165	+1.6%
1970	930	−20.2%

Year	Pop.	±%
1980	736	−20.9%
1991	662	−10.1%
2001	617	−6.8%
2011	640	+3.7%
2021	600	−6.2%

Source: Censuses

== Transport ==
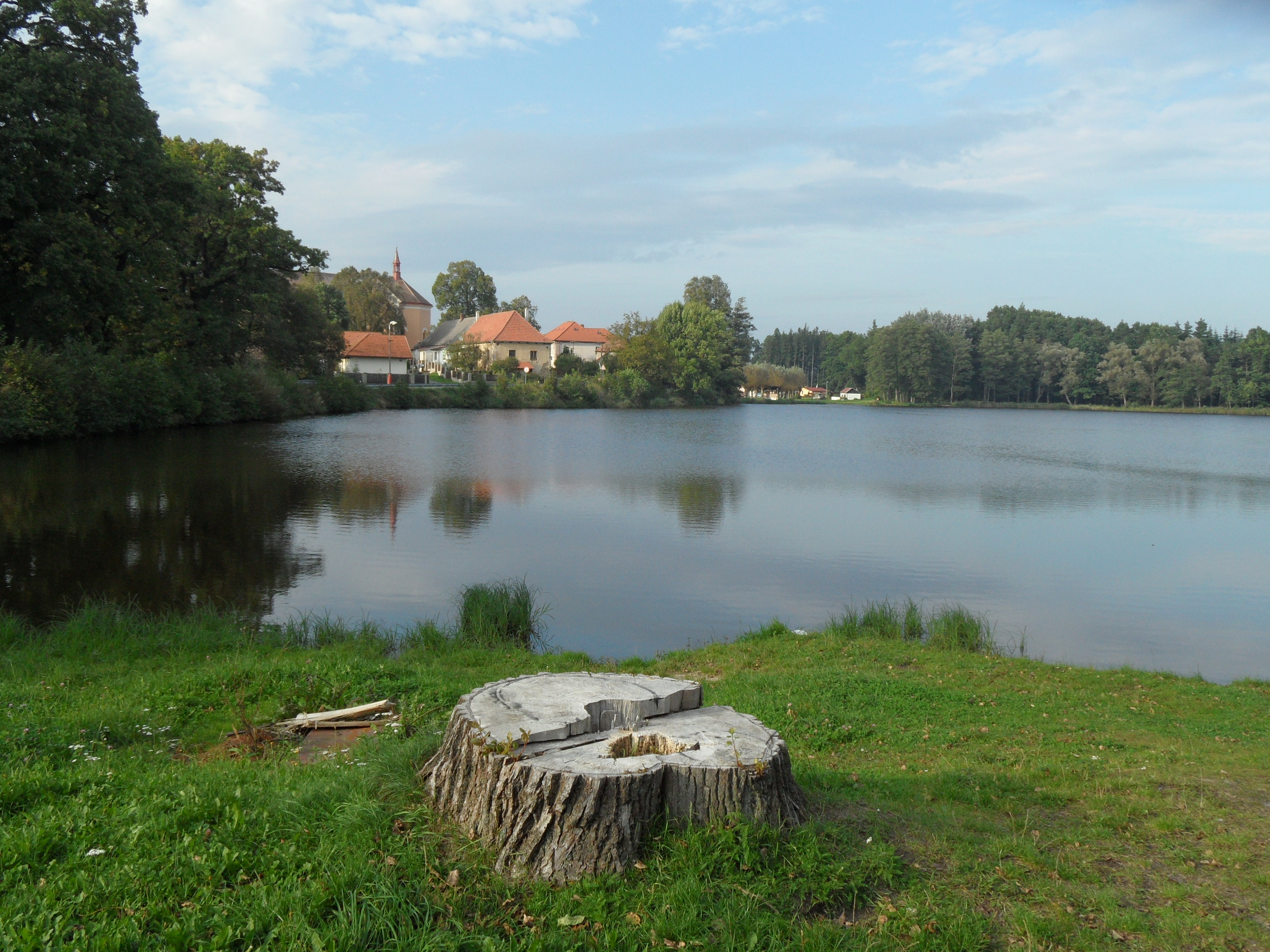
Zbýšovský rybník

There are no railways or major roads passing through the municipality.

== Sights ==
The most important monument is the Church of The Nativity of Saint John the Baptist. It was built in the Neo-Romanesque style in 1884.

In Chlum is the ruin of the Chlum Castle. The castle was founded in 1276. Between 1620 and 1626, during the Thirty Years' War, it was looted several times and became abandoned. Only the south tower and three rock-cut basement rooms have survived to this day.

== Notable people ==
- Milan Zeleny (1942–2023), Czech-American economist
