= Nové Dvory (Kutná Hora District) =

- Market town
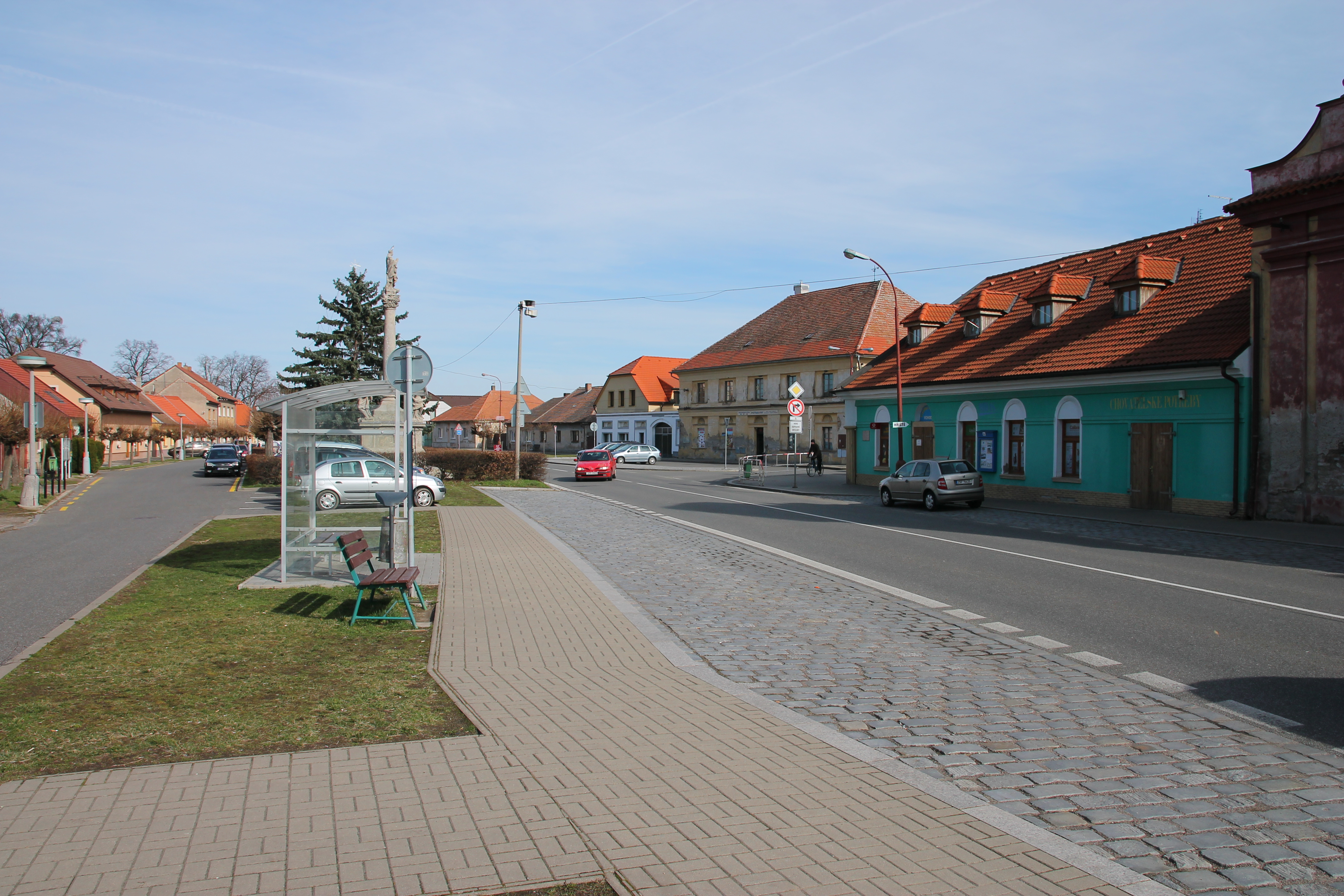
- The square Masarykovo náměstí

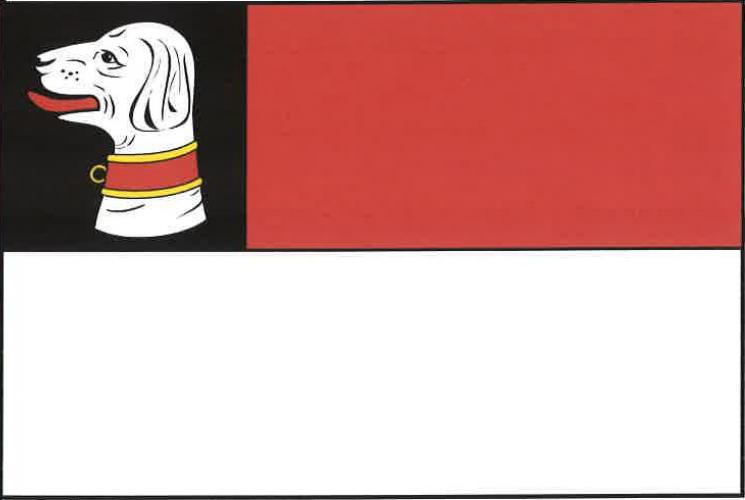
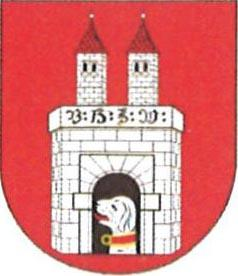
- Flag Coat of arms

- Location in the Czech Republic
- Coordinates: 49°58′6″N 15°19′41″E
- Country: Czech Republic
- Region: Central Bohemian
- District: Kutná Hora
- First mentioned: 1370

Area
  - Total: 9.02 km^{2} (3.48 sq mi)
- Elevation: 208 m (682 ft)

Population (2026-01-01)
  - Total: 910
  - Density: 100/km^{2} (260/sq mi)
- Time zone: UTC+1 (CET)
  - Summer (DST): UTC+2 (CEST)
- Postal code: 285 31
- Website: www.novedvory.cz

Nové Dvory (Czech pronunciation: [ˈnovɛː ˈdvorɪ]; German: Neuhof) is a market town in Kutná Hora District in the Central Bohemian Region of the Czech Republic. It has about 900 inhabitants. The market town is located on the Klejnárka River in the Central Elbe Table. The market town centre is well preserved and is protected as an urban monument zone.

== Administrative division ==
Nové Dvory consists of two municipal parts (in brackets population according to the 2021 census):

- Nové Dvory (830)
- Ovčáry (21)

== Etymology ==
The name Nové Dvory means 'new courtyards', 'new farmyards' in Czech.

== Geography ==
Nové Dvory is located about 3 kilometres (2 mi) northeast of Kutná Hora and 32 km (20 mi) west of Pardubice. It lies in a flat landscape in the Central Elbe Table. The market town is situated on the right bank of the Klejnárka River. The fishpond Ovčárecký rybník is located in the southern part of the territory.

== History ==
The first written mention of Nové Dvory is from 1370. The area was owned and settled by Cistercian monks from the nearby Sedlec Abbey. After the abbey was destroyed by the Hussites in 1421, Nové Dvory was acquired by the royal chamber. Nové Dvory changed hands often as the kings pledged the village to various people. In the first half of the 16th century, it was owned by the restored Sedlec Abbey. In 1552, Nové Dvory was bought by Hynek Martinický, who established gardens and a fishpond here. After that, it often changed owners again, the most notable owners being the Zierotin family.

In 1701, Nové Dvory was promoted to a market town by Emperor Leopold I.

== Demographics ==
Historical population

Year	Pop.	±%
1869	1,342	—
1880	1,341	−0.1%
1890	1,354	+1.0%
1900	1,322	−2.4%
1910	1,315	−0.5%

Year	Pop.	±%
1921	1,180	−10.3%
1930	1,129	−4.3%
1950	891	−21.1%
1961	935	+4.9%
1970	857	−8.3%

Year	Pop.	±%
1980	893	+4.2%
1991	828	−7.3%
2001	822	−0.7%
2011	814	−1.0%
2021	851	+4.5%

Source: Censuses

== Transport ==
The I/2 road from Prague to Kutná Hora and Pardubice runs through the market town. The I/38 road (the section from Kolín to Havlíčkův Brod) runs through the western part of the municipal territory and intersects with the I/2.

== Sights ==
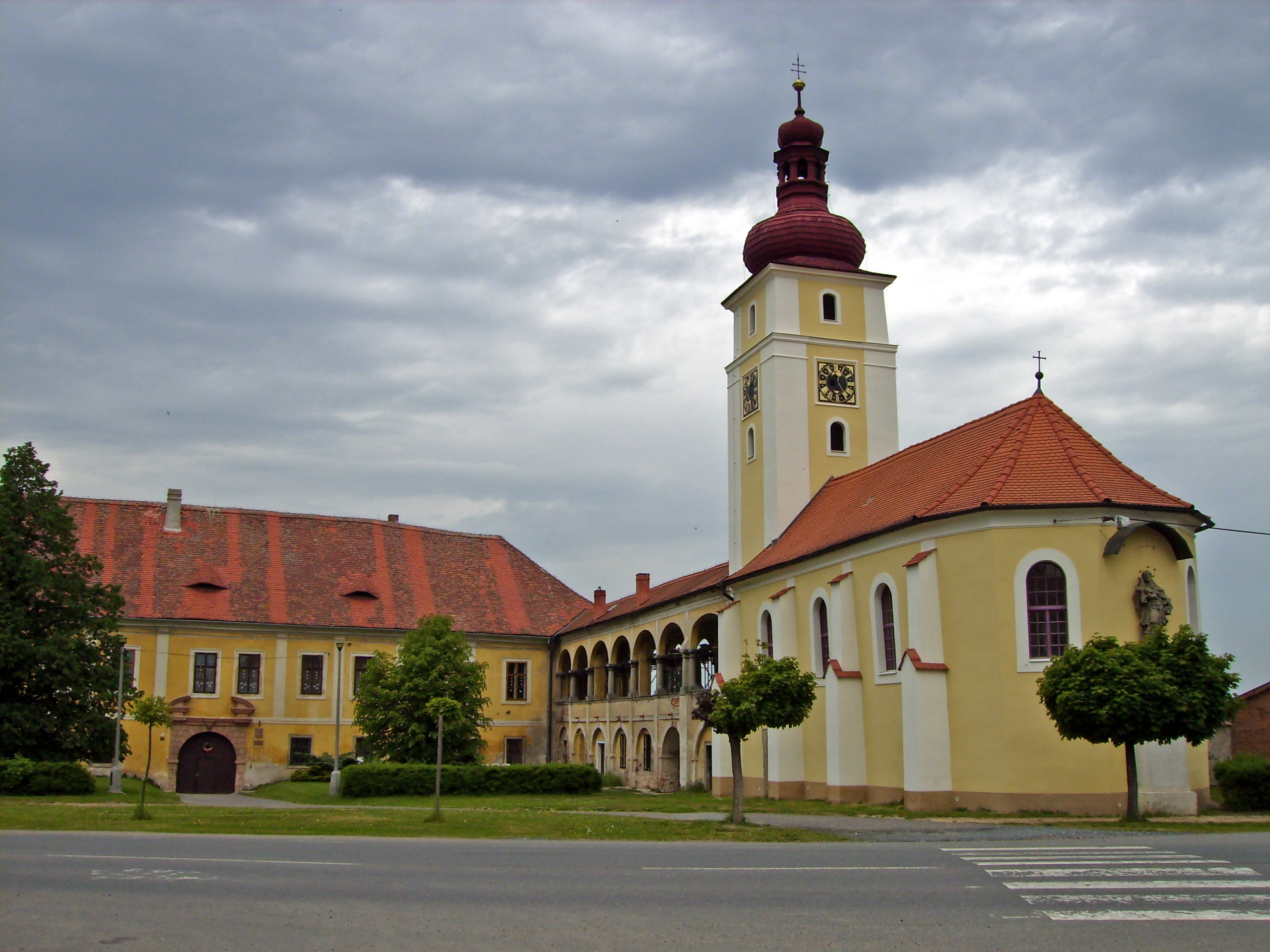
Nové Dvory Castle with the Church of Saint Martin

The main landmarks are the Nové Dvory Castle with the Church of Saint Martin, connected together by an arcade corridor. A fortress in Nové Dvory, first documented in 1534, was rebuilt into a Renaissance castle in 1588, then it was completely rebuilt in the early Baroque style by Count Bernard Věžník in 1679–1686. The neighbouring Chapel of Saint Martin was rebuilt into a church around 1683. Today the building of the castle serves as a primary school.

The Dominican monastery was built in the early Baroque style in 1727. Its Church of Saint Anne was built in 1695–1696. Today the premises of the monastery are unused.

In the north is the castle park of the Kačina Castle. However, the castle lies outside the territory of Nové Dvory. A large part of the territory of Nové Dvory, including this castle park, belongs to the landscape monument zone called Žehušicko. It is a unique composed Baroque cultural landscape.
