= Konárovice =

- Municipality
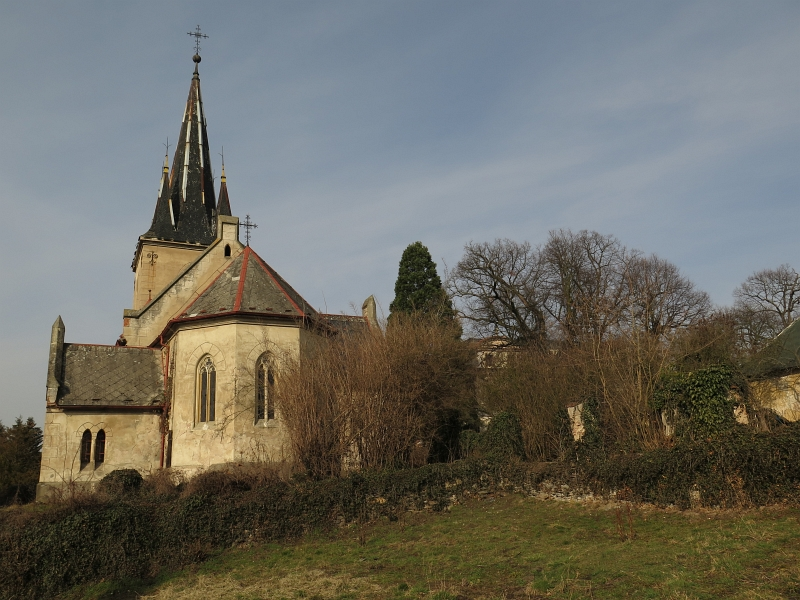
- Church of the Exaltation of the Holy Cross

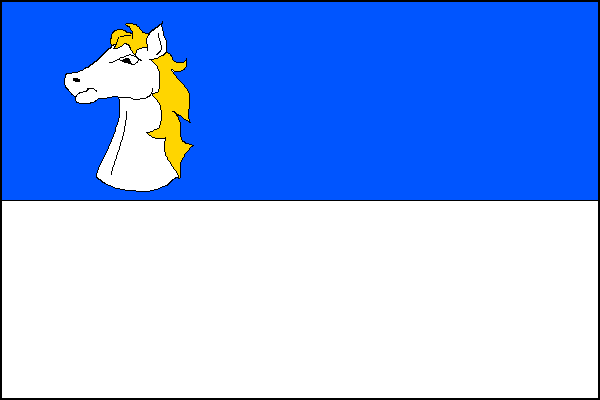
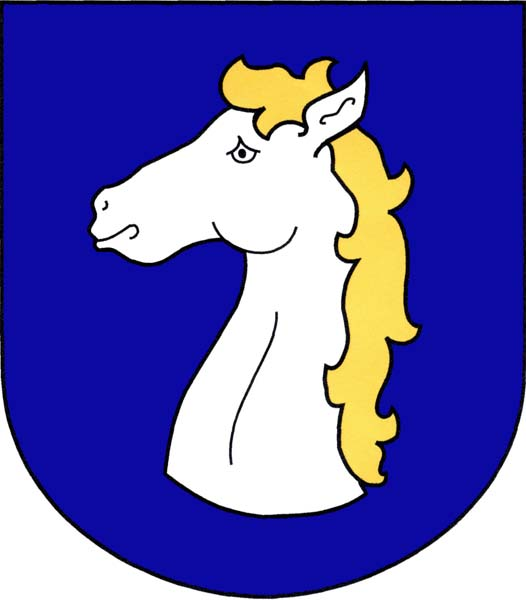
- Flag Coat of arms

- Location in the Czech Republic
- Coordinates: 50°2′29″N 15°17′3″E
- Country: Czech Republic
- Region: Central Bohemian
- District: Kolín
- First mentioned: 1352

Area
  - Total: 10.81 km^{2} (4.17 sq mi)
- Elevation: 225 m (738 ft)

Population (2026-01-01)
  - Total: 1,029
  - Density: 95.19/km^{2} (246.5/sq mi)
- Time zone: UTC+1 (CET)
  - Summer (DST): UTC+2 (CEST)
- Postal code: 281 25
- Website: www.konarovice.cz

Konárovice is a municipality and village in Kolín District in the Central Bohemian Region of the Czech Republic. It has about 1,000 inhabitants.

== Etymology ==
Konárovice was initially called Koňařovice. The name was derived from the Czech word koňař ('horseman'). There was a horseman living here, who belonged to the princely officials of the nearby castle and who bred the horses for the prince on the large meadows of the Elbe.

== Geography ==
Konárovice is located about 6 kilometres (4 mi) east of Kolín and 53 km (33 mi) east of Prague. It lies in a fertile landscape of the Polabí lowland region, on the border between the East Elbe Table and Central Elbe Table. It is situated on the right bank of the Elbe River.

The soil is mainly clay, with loess and diluvian metal. Both land and location are suitable for cultivation of grapes, peaches and apricots. The average annual temperature is 9.3 °C; the sum of annual precipitation is around 650 mm. The climate is very similar to that of South Moravian Region (e.g. Velkopavlovická subregion), suitable for the production of wine.

== History ==
The first written mention of Konárovice is from 1352 in the registration of the Pope's tithes. In that time Konárovice had already been established as a knight's stronghold. The town's church was mentioned for the first time in 1358.

In the following centuries the owners of Konárovice often changed. In 1772, a farm was bought at auction by the Countess Elizabeth de Quasco. She used it as a summer residence and in 1775, she had rebuilt the chateau into its present form. Later in the year she ordered the building of a new parish house, but records of the first parish priest date only from 1820. Under control of the Countess, education flourished; in 1810 the first ordinary school was opened in Konárovice.

During this same period mulberry gardens were planted in Konárovice for the purpose of silk manufacturing. This trade became very successful, reaching its greatest flowering around 1820.

In 1856, Count Jan Nepomuk of Harrach, engraving master and chamberlain, gained Konárovice and brought the local economy to great prosperity. He then sold the entire estate to Josef Götzl, manufacturer and magistrate of Karlín.

The municipality includes a hamlet called Jelen where a brewery and a large restaurant were built in the 14th century. Other locality is the recreational hamlet Včelín. Its name was derived from the beekeeping station with a museum which was opened in 1928.

== Demographics ==
Historical population

Year	Pop.	±%
1869	824	—
1880	938	+13.8%
1890	975	+3.9%
1900	903	−7.4%
1910	925	+2.4%

Year	Pop.	±%
1921	916	−1.0%
1930	834	−9.0%
1950	688	−17.5%
1961	782	+13.7%
1970	802	+2.6%

Year	Pop.	±%
1980	763	−4.9%
1991	675	−11.5%
2001	684	+1.3%
2011	807	+18.0%
2021	979	+21.3%

Source: Censuses

== Economy ==
Konárovice is known for viticulture. On the sunny slopes of Konárovice grapes have been cultivated since time immemorial. On the Na Vinici hill in Konárovice the last vineyard of the region was preserved until the beginning of the 20th century. Since 1995, the vineyards gradually have been renewed.

== Transport ==
There are no railways or major roads passing through the municipality.

== Sights ==
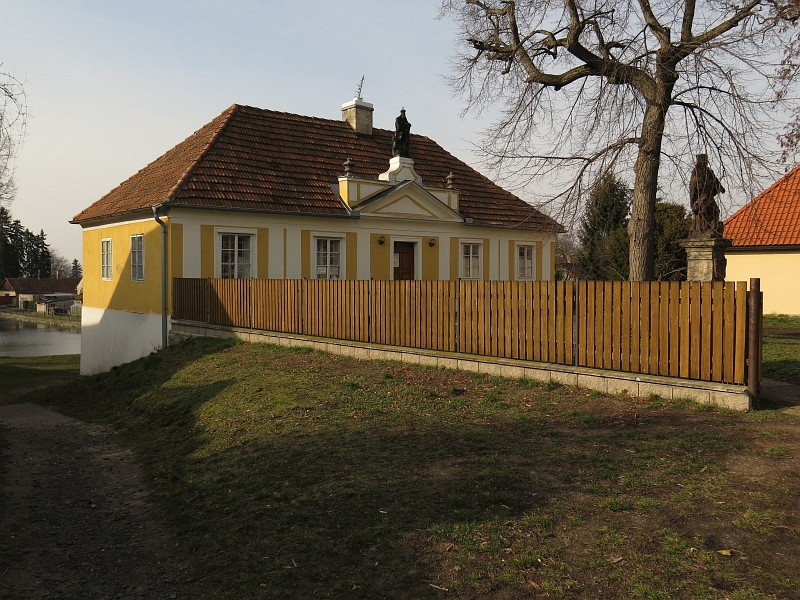
Baroque hospital

In Konárovice are three cultural monuments. The Konárovice Castle was originally an early Baroque castle built in 1661. It was rebuilt into its current Rococo form in 1775. The castle is surrounded with a small castle park. Since 2003, it has been owned by the American actor Crispin Glover.

The Church of the Exaltation of the Holy Cross from the 14th century was rebuilt in the late Gothic style in 1500, but soon fell into disrepair. It was baroque rebuilt in 1669–1683. The last reconstruction, into its current pseudo-Gothic form, took place in 1887–1889. The bell tower is equipped by two bells that dates from 1565 and 1612.

Next to the castle stands a Baroque hospital, built after 1772. In front of the building stands a valuable statue of Saint John of Nepomuk.
