= Církvice (Kolín District) =

- Municipality
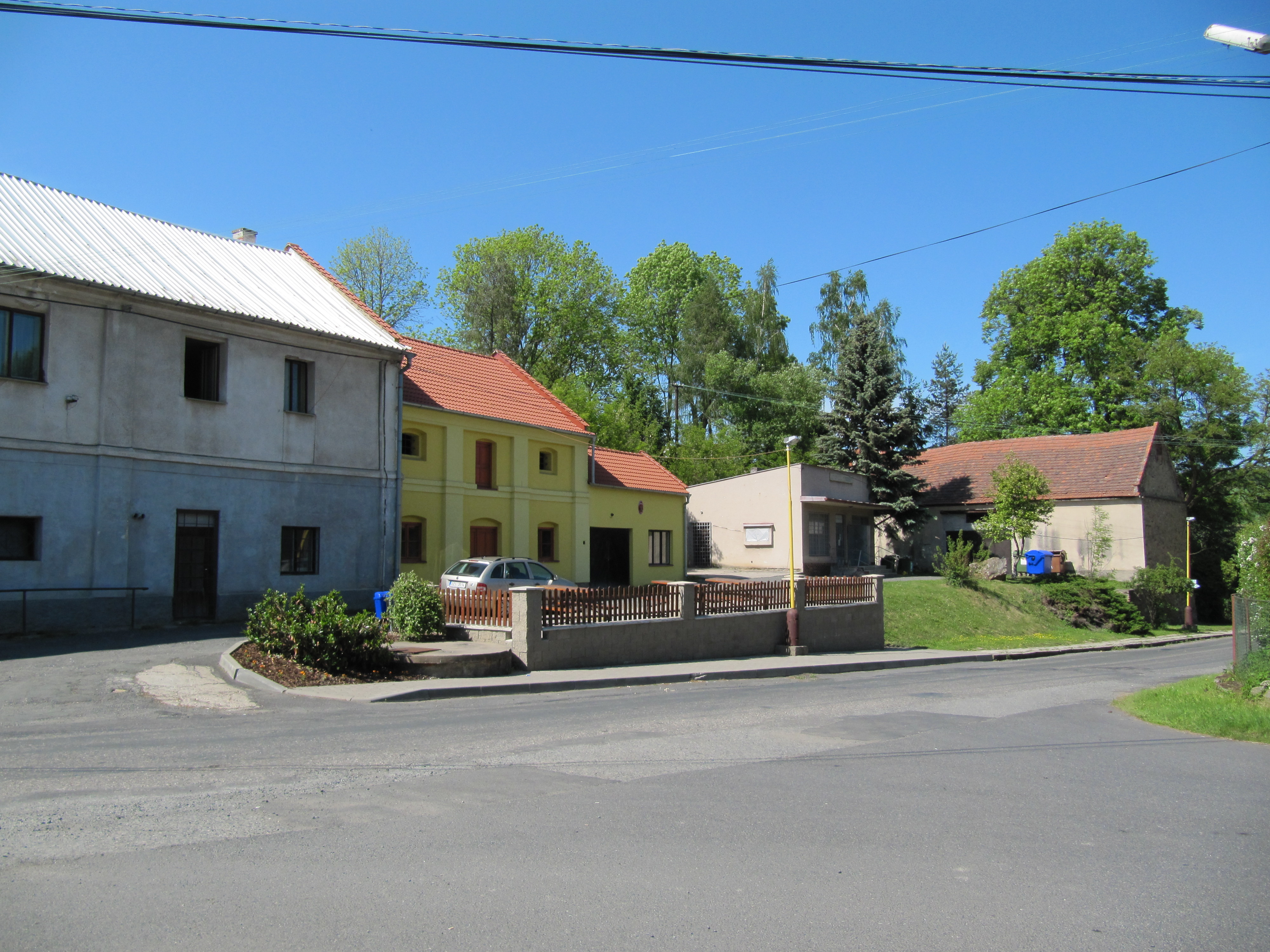
- Centre of Církvice

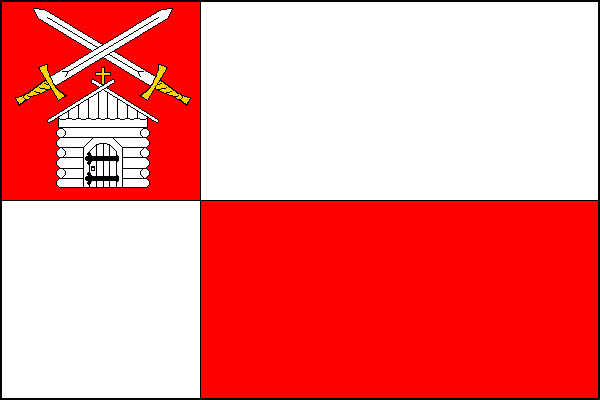
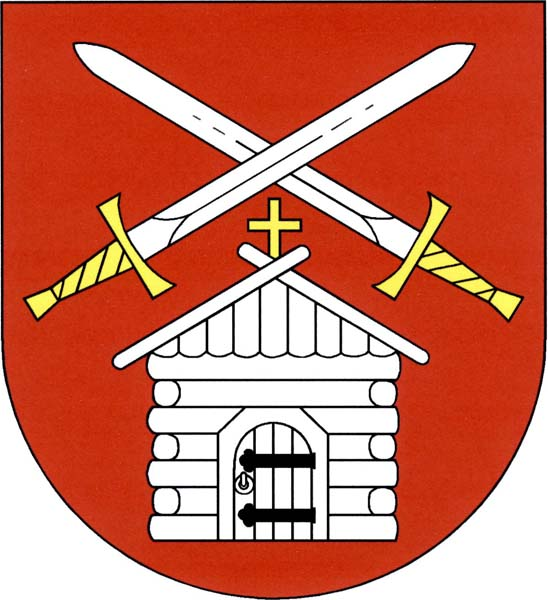
- Flag Coat of arms

- Location in the Czech Republic
- Coordinates: 49°54′34″N 15°0′57″E
- Country: Czech Republic
- Region: Central Bohemian
- District: Kolín
- First mentioned: 1400

Area
  - Total: 2.45 km^{2} (0.95 sq mi)
- Elevation: 374 m (1,227 ft)

Population (2026-01-01)
  - Total: 188
  - Density: 76.7/km^{2} (199/sq mi)
- Time zone: UTC+1 (CET)
  - Summer (DST): UTC+2 (CEST)
- Postal code: 281 44
- Website: www.obeccirkvice.cz

Církvice is a municipality and village in Kolín District in the Central Bohemian Region of the Czech Republic. It has about 200 inhabitants.

== Demographics ==
Historical population
Year	Pop.	±%
1869	451	—
1880	467	+3.5%
1890	467	+0.0%
1900	440	−5.8%
1910	485	+10.2%
1921	449	−7.4%
1930	405	−9.8%
1950	293	−27.7%
1961	289	−1.4%
1970	238	−17.6%
1980	195	−18.1%
1991	157	−19.5%
2001	132	−15.9%
2011	153	+15.9%
2021	161	+5.2%
Source: Censuses
