= Žabonosy =

- Municipality
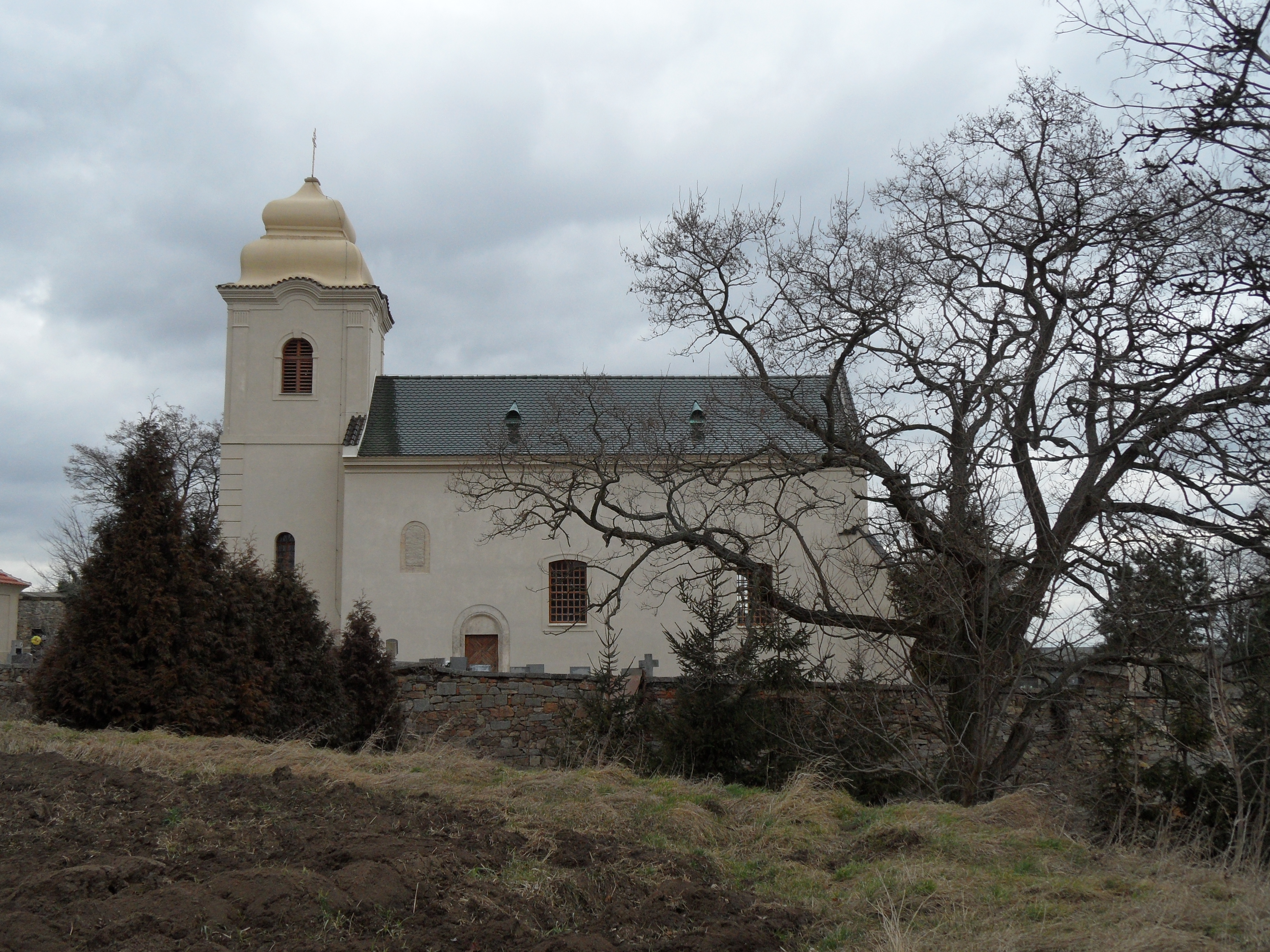
- Church of Saint Wenceslaus

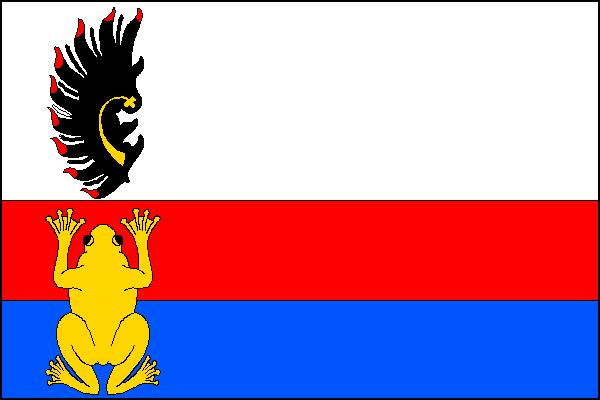
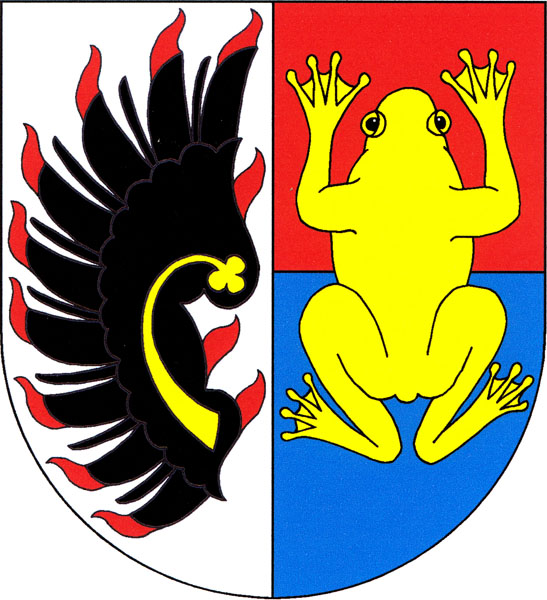
- Flag Coat of arms

- Location in the Czech Republic
- Coordinates: 50°2′8″N 15°1′38″E
- Country: Czech Republic
- Region: Central Bohemian
- District: Kolín
- First mentioned: 1352

Area
  - Total: 3.11 km^{2} (1.20 sq mi)
- Elevation: 219 m (719 ft)

Population (2026-01-01)
  - Total: 264
  - Density: 84.9/km^{2} (220/sq mi)
- Time zone: UTC+1 (CET)
  - Summer (DST): UTC+2 (CEST)
- Postal code: 280 02
- Website: www.obec-zabonosy.cz

Žabonosy is a municipality and village in Kolín District in the Central Bohemian Region of the Czech Republic. It has about 300 inhabitants.

== Etymology ==
The name originated either from the combination nosit žáby (literally 'to carry frogs', meaning 'to sell frogs') or from žabí nosy ('frog noses', which meant that people with frog noses lived here).

== Geography ==
Žabonosy is located about 12 kilometres (7 mi) west of Kolín and 35 km (22 mi) east of Prague. It lies in a flat agricultural landscape of the Central Elbe Table. The highest point is at 256 m (840 ft) above sea level. The Výrovka River flows through the northern part of the municipality. The Bečvárka Stream flows through the village and then joins the Výrovka. The fishpond Rozkoš is built on the Bečvárka.

== History ==
The first written mention of Žabonosy is from 1352. From 1652 until the establishment of an independent municipality in 1850, Žabonosy was part of the Radim estate and shared its owners.

== Demographics ==
Historical population

Year	Pop.	±%
1869	472	—
1880	562	+19.1%
1890	638	+13.5%
1900	602	−5.6%
1910	517	−14.1%

Year	Pop.	±%
1921	503	−2.7%
1930	523	+4.0%
1950	428	−18.2%
1961	436	+1.9%
1970	397	−8.9%

Year	Pop.	±%
1980	316	−20.4%
1991	217	−31.3%
2001	202	−6.9%
2011	215	+6.4%
2021	244	+13.5%

Source: Censuses

== Transport ==
Žabonosy is located on the railway line Kouřim–Pečky.

== Sights ==
The main landmark of Žabonosy is the Church of Saint Wenceslaus. It is a Gothic church with a Romanesque core from the 10th century, modified in the Baroque style in 1721.
