= Výrovka =

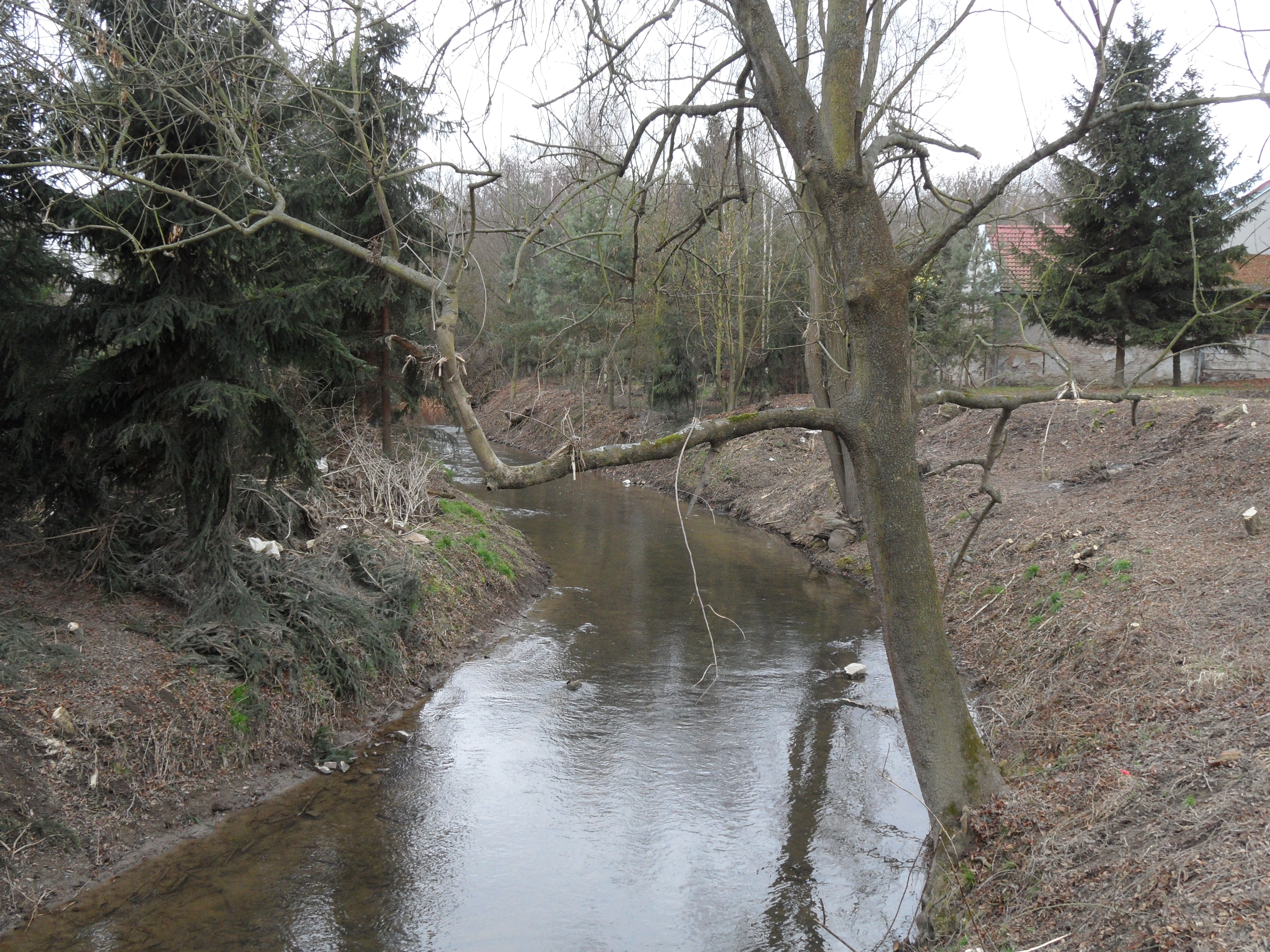
- The Výrovka in Třebovle-Miškovice

Location
- Country: Czech Republic
- Region: Central Bohemian

Physical characteristics
- Source
  - location: Uhlířské Janovice, Upper Sázava Hills
  - coordinates: 49°50′47″N 15°3′25″E
  - elevation: 493 m (1,617 ft)
- Mouth
  - location: Elbe
  - coordinates: 50°10′5″N 14°58′59″E
  - elevation: 181 m (594 ft)
- Length: 61.9 km (38.5 mi)
- Basin size: 542.5 km^{2} (209.5 sq mi)
- Discharge
  - average: 1.94 m^{3}/s (69 cu ft/s) near estuary

Basin features
- Progression: Elbe→ North Sea

The Výrovka (Czech pronunciation: [ˈviːrofka]; also called Vavřinecký potok upstream) is a river in the Czech Republic, a left tributary of the Elbe River. It flows through the Central Bohemian Region. It is 61.9 km (38.5 mi) long.

== Characteristic ==
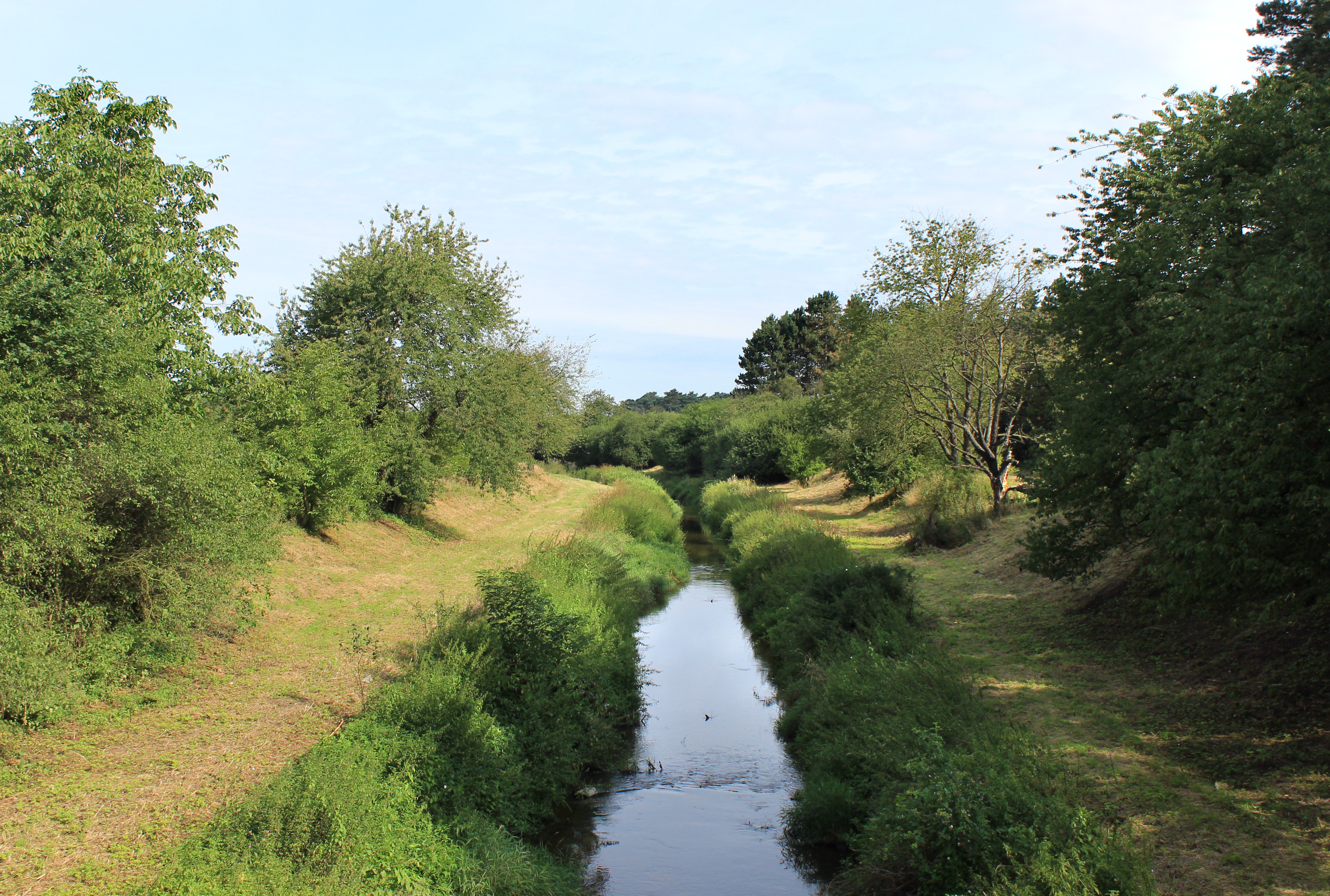
The Výrovka in Kostelní Lhota

The Výrovka originates in the territory of Uhlířské Janovice in the Upper Sázava Hills at an elevation of 493 m (1,617 ft) and flows to Kostomlátky, where it enters the Elbe River at an elevation of 181 m (594 ft). It is 61.9 km (38.5 mi) long. Its drainage basin has an area of 542.5 km^{2} (209.5 sq mi). The average discharge at its mouth is 1.94 m3/s.

The longest tributaries of the Výrovka are:

| Tributary | Length (km) | River km | Side |
|---|---|---|---|
| Šembera | 28.2 | 3.4 | left |
| Bečvárka | 21.7 | 23.2 | right |
| Blinka | 12.2 | 21.6 | right |
| Káča | 12.0 | 5.1 | right |
| Onomyšlský potok | 10.3 | 51.9 | right |
| Bohouňovický potok | 8.6 | 42.8 | left |

== Course ==
The most populous settlement on the river is the town of Uhlířské Janovice, where the river originates. The river also briefly crosses the territory of Nymburk. The river further flows through the municipal territories of Uhlířské Janovice, Vavřinec, Zásmuky, Církvice, Barchovice, Toušice, Kouřim, Klášterní Skalice, Třebovle, Zalešany, Žabonosy, Plaňany, Vrbčany, Radim, Chotutice, Dobřichov, Ratenice, Vrbová Lhota, Písková Lhota, Kostelní Lhota, Hořátev, Zvěřínek, Písty, Nymburk and Kostomlátky.

== Bodies of water ==
There are 441 bodies of water in the basin area. The largest of them is the fishpond Vavřinecký rybník with an area of 78 ha (190 acres), built directly on the river. A system of several small fishpond is located on the upper course of the river near the spring.

== Tourism ==
The upper course of the Výrovka is suitable for river tourism, but it is navigable only when water is released from Vavřinecký rybník.

== See also ==
- List of rivers of the Czech Republic
