= Písková Lhota =

Písková Lhota may refer to places in the Czech Republic:

- Písková Lhota (Mladá Boleslav District), a municipality and village in the Central Bohemian Region
- Písková Lhota (Nymburk District), a municipality and village in the Central Bohemian Region
