= Kuřimany =

- Municipality
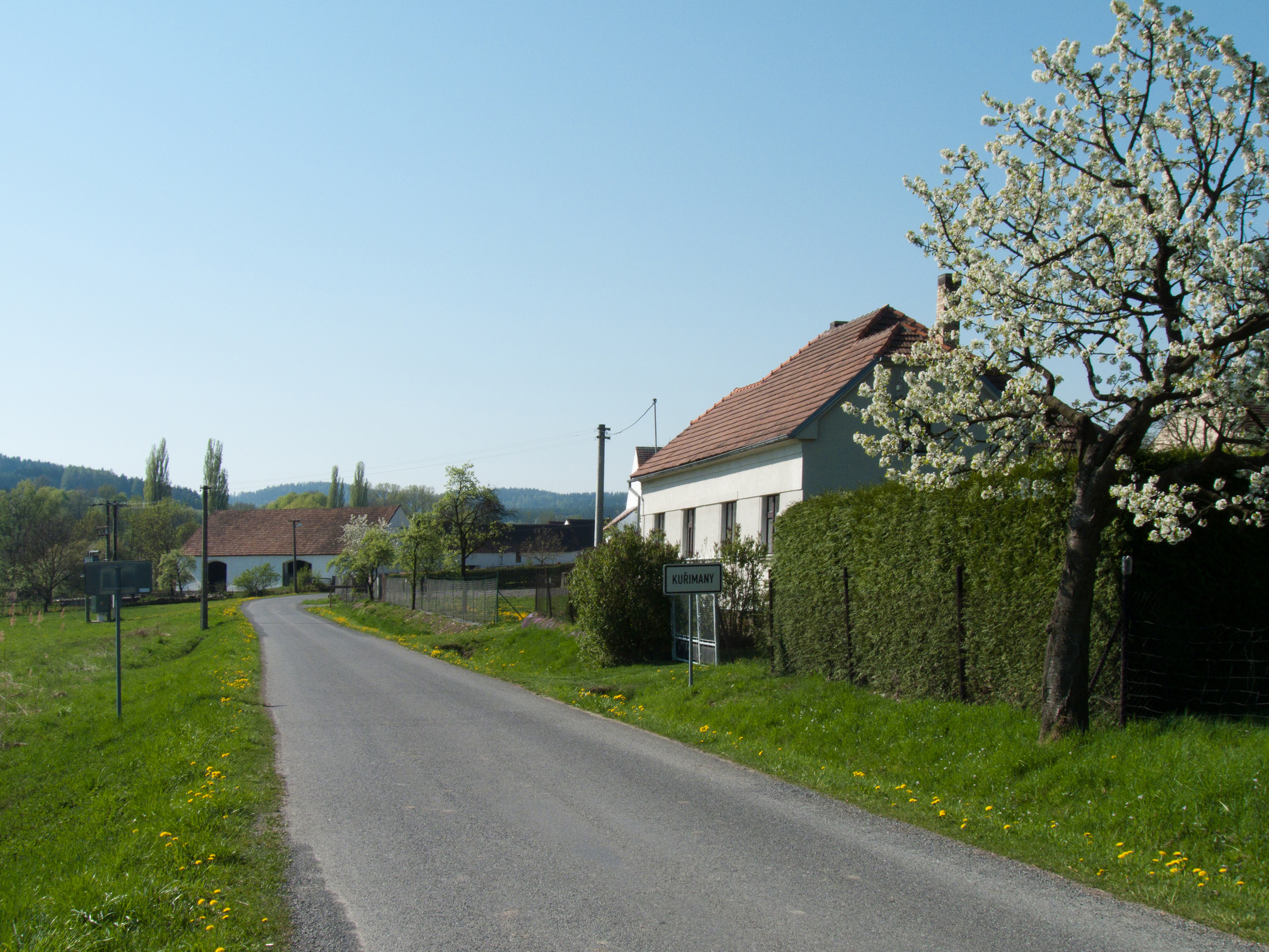
- Northern entrance to Kuřimany

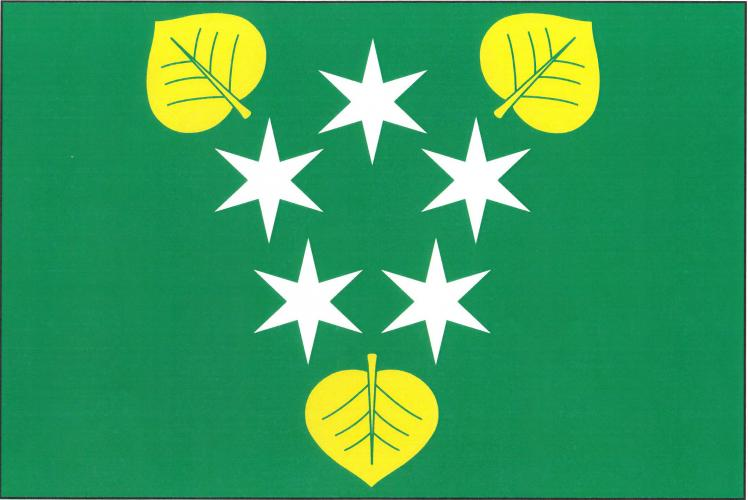
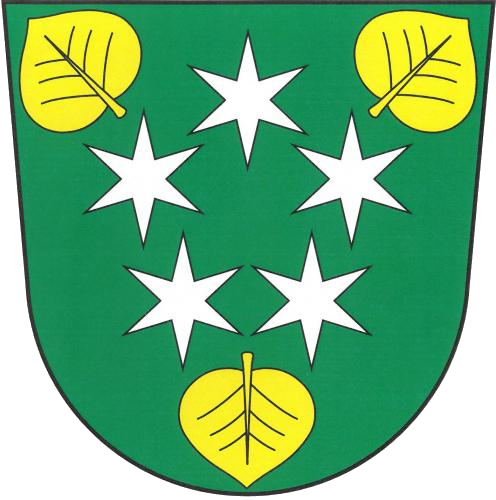
- Flag Coat of arms

- Location in the Czech Republic
- Coordinates: 49°12′14″N 13°58′5″E
- Country: Czech Republic
- Region: South Bohemian
- District: Strakonice
- First mentioned: 1327

Area
  - Total: 3.11 km^{2} (1.20 sq mi)
- Elevation: 476 m (1,562 ft)

Population (2026-01-01)
  - Total: 47
  - Density: 15/km^{2} (39/sq mi)
- Time zone: UTC+1 (CET)
  - Summer (DST): UTC+2 (CEST)
- Postal code: 386 01
- Website: www.kurimany.cz

Kuřimany is a municipality and village in Strakonice District in the South Bohemian Region of the Czech Republic. It has about 50 inhabitants.

== Etymology ==
The name Kuřimany meant "the village of people who lived in Kouřim / who came from Kouřim".

== Geography ==
Kuřimany is located about 7 kilometres (4 mi) southeast of Strakonice and 44 km (27 mi) northwest of České Budějovice. It lies in the Bohemian Forest Foothills. The highest point is at 565 m (1,854 ft) above sea level. The brook Třešovický potok flows through the municipality.

== History ==
The first written mention of Kuřimany is from 1327.

== Demographics ==
Historical population

Year	Pop.	±%
1869	133	—
1880	135	+1.5%
1890	124	−8.1%
1900	116	−6.5%
1910	118	+1.7%

Year	Pop.	±%
1921	115	−2.5%
1930	119	+3.5%
1950	75	−37.0%
1961	83	+10.7%
1970	58	−30.1%

Year	Pop.	±%
1980	51	−12.1%
1991	42	−17.6%
2001	28	−33.3%
2011	26	−7.1%
2021	44	+69.2%

Source: Censuses

== Transport ==
There are no railways or major roads passing through the municipality.

== Sights ==
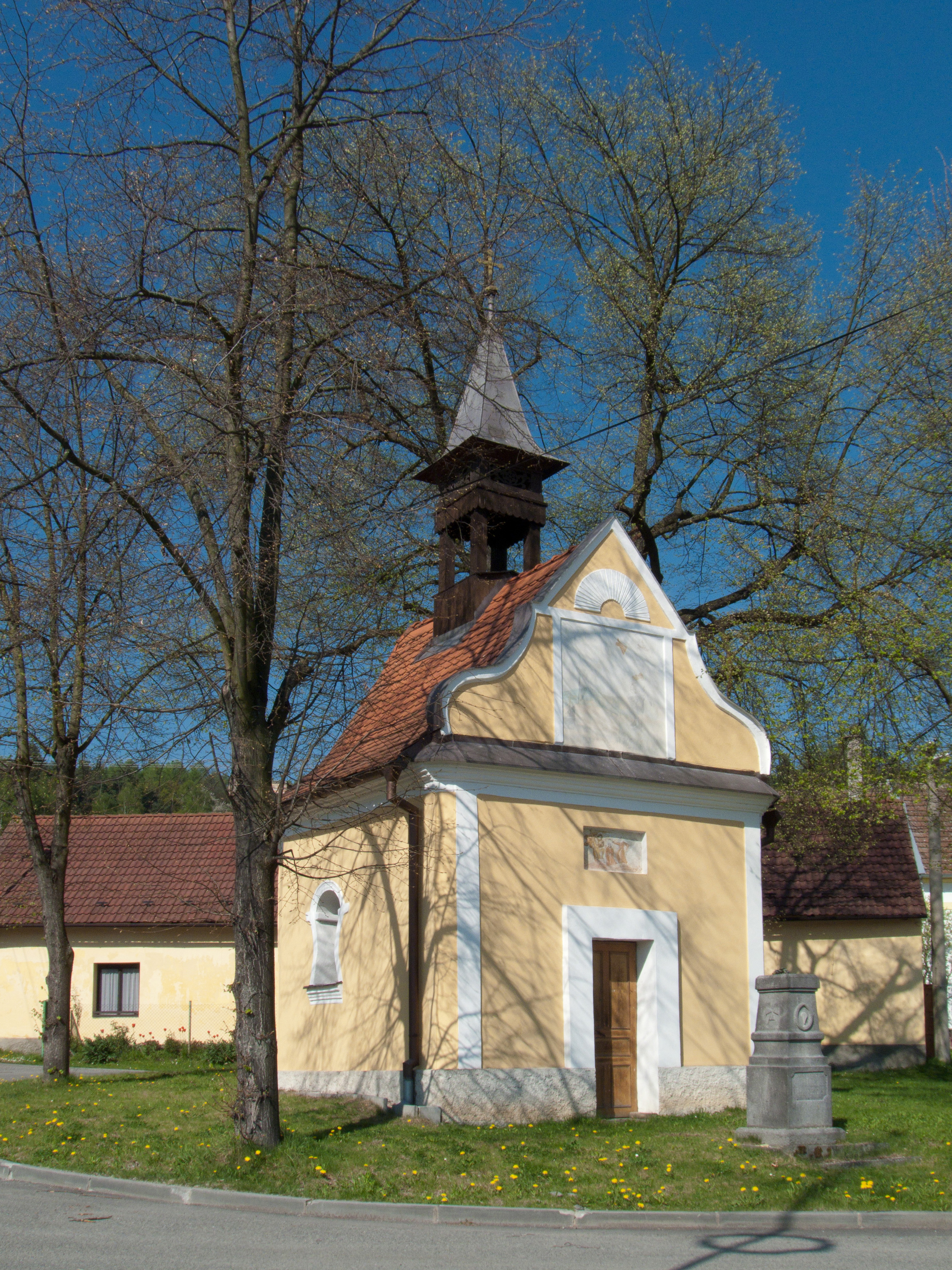
Chapel of Saint John of Nepomuk

The main landmark of Kuřimany is the Chapel of Saint John of Nepomuk with a Baroque gable and bell tower.
