= Vavřinec (Kutná Hora District) =

- Municipality
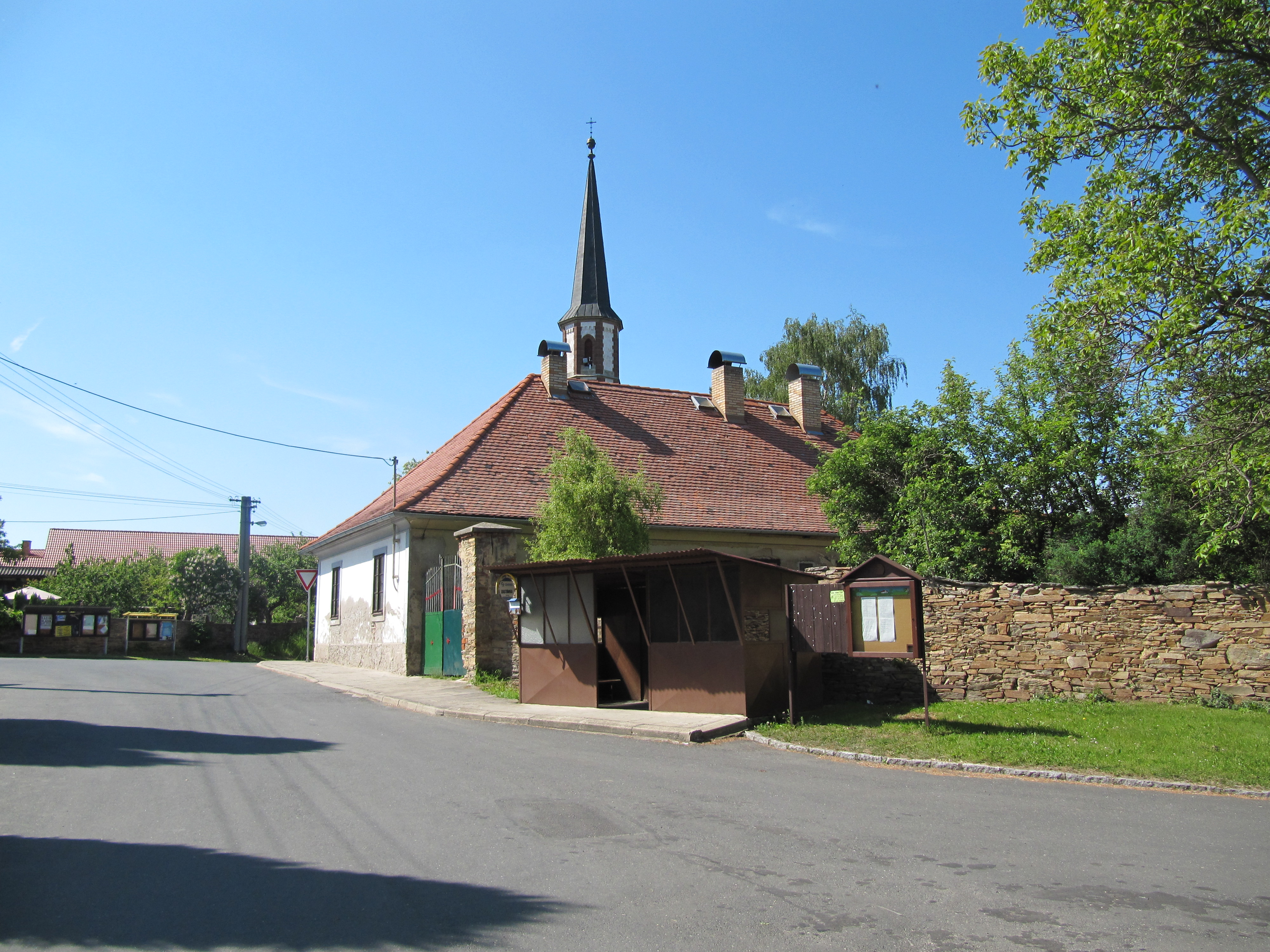
- Centre of Vavřinec

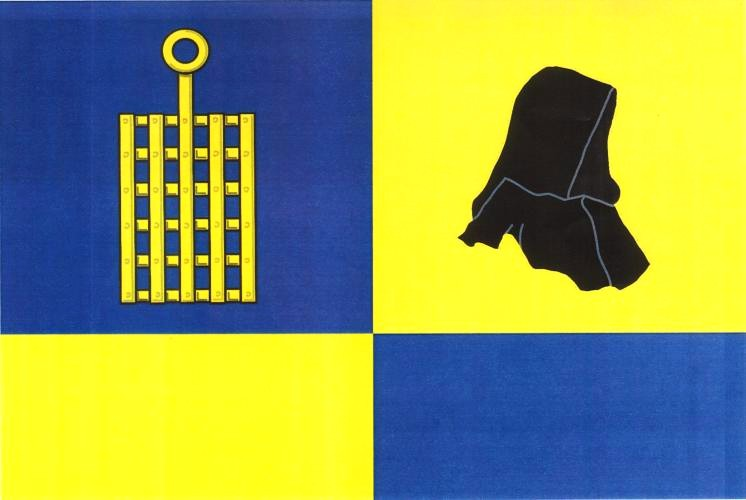
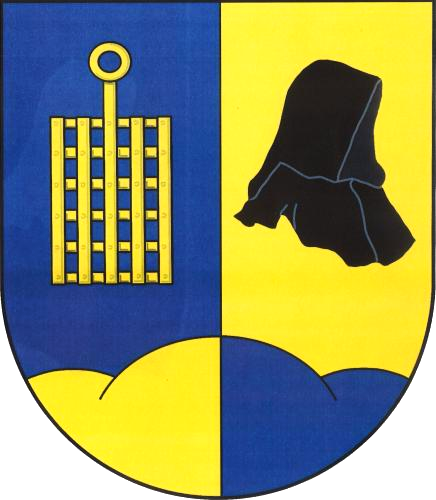
- Flag Coat of arms

- Location in the Czech Republic
- Coordinates: 49°54′49″N 15°2′0″E
- Country: Czech Republic
- Region: Central Bohemian
- District: Kutná Hora
- First mentioned: 1318

Area
  - Total: 10.69 km^{2} (4.13 sq mi)
- Elevation: 389 m (1,276 ft)

Population (2026-01-01)
  - Total: 592
  - Density: 55.4/km^{2} (143/sq mi)
- Time zone: UTC+1 (CET)
  - Summer (DST): UTC+2 (CEST)
- Postal code: 285 04
- Website: www.ou-vavrinec.cz

Vavřinec is a municipality and village in Kutná Hora District in the Central Bohemian Region of the Czech Republic. It has about 600 inhabitants.

== Administrative division ==
Vavřinec consists of three municipal parts (in brackets population according to the 2021 census):

- Vavřinec (187)
- Chmeliště (319)
- Žíšov (85)

== Etymology ==
The village of Vavřinec was named after the patron of the original Romanesque church that stood here – Saint Lawrence (Czech: svatý Vavřinec).

== Geography ==
Vavřinec is located about 17 kilometres (11 mi) west of Kutná Hora and 39 km (24 mi) southeast of Prague. It lies in the Upper Sázava Hills. The highest point is the hill Dubina at 440 m (1,444 ft) above sea level. The Výrovka River flows through the municipality and supplies the fishpond Vavřinecký rybník, which is the largest body of water in the district. There are also several other fishponds.

== History ==
The first written mention of Vavřinec is from 1318. The settlement and the local church were founded in the 14th century by monks from the Sázava Monastery.

== Demographics ==
Historical population

Year	Pop.	±%
1869	908	—
1880	871	−4.1%
1890	911	+4.6%
1900	858	−5.8%
1910	861	+0.3%

Year	Pop.	±%
1921	906	+5.2%
1930	846	−6.6%
1950	669	−20.9%
1961	633	−5.4%
1970	566	−10.6%

Year	Pop.	±%
1980	480	−15.2%
1991	448	−6.7%
2001	449	+0.2%
2011	494	+10.0%
2021	591	+19.6%

Source: Censuses

== Transport ==
The village of Chmeliště is located on the railway line Kolín–Ledečko. In the municipal territory is also the train station Hatě, which serves the neighbouring village of Hatě within Bečváry.

== Sights ==
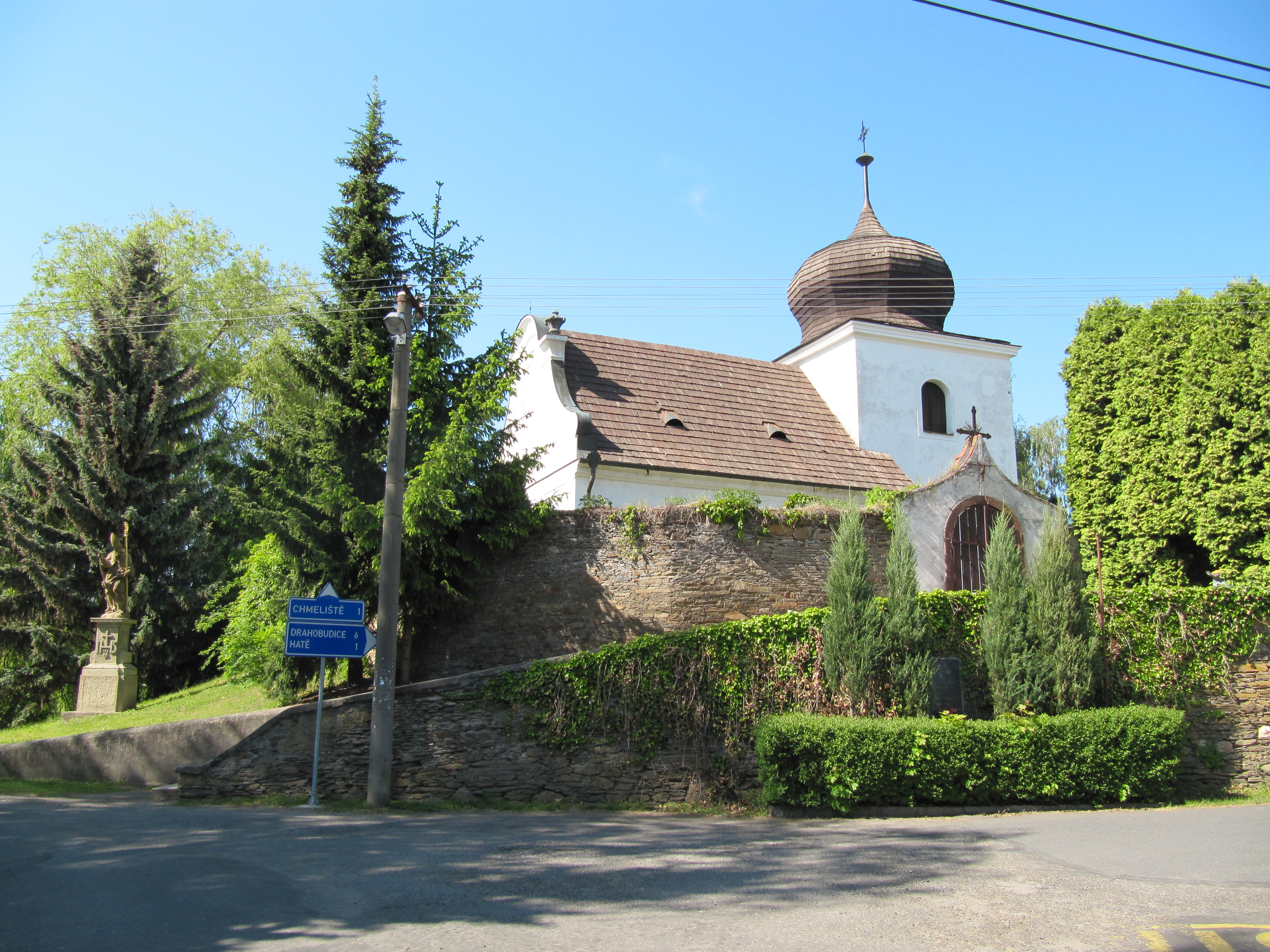
Church of Saint Nicholas

The main landmark of Vavřinec is the Church of Saint Lawrence. The current building, which replaced the old medieval church, was built in the Historicist style in 1876–1877.

The Church of Saint Nicholas is located in Žíšov. It was originally an early Gothic church from the second half of the 13th century. In the first half of the 18th century, it was rebuilt in the Baroque style.
