= Kostelní Lhota =

- Municipality
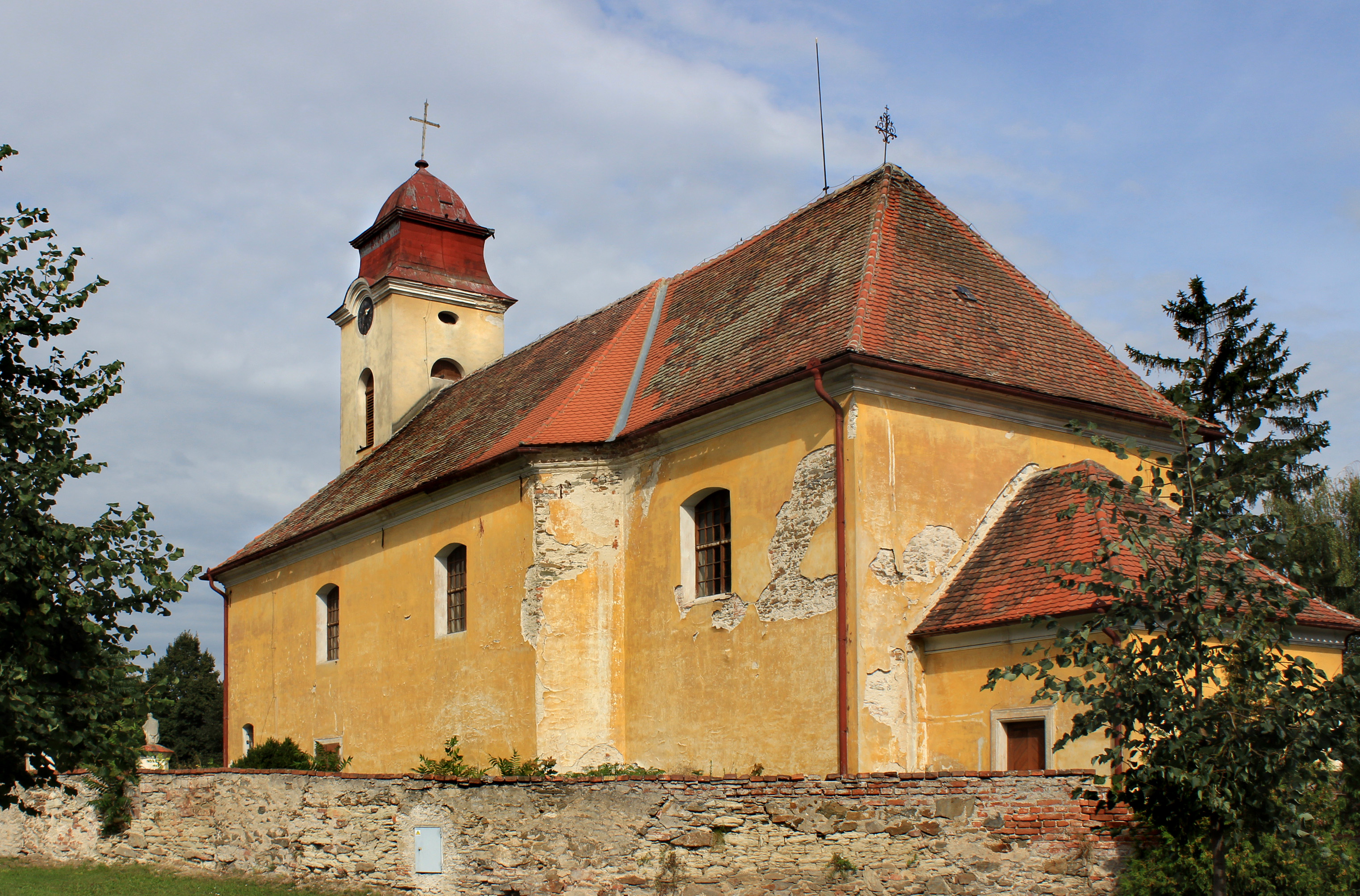
- Church of the Assumption of the Virgin Mary

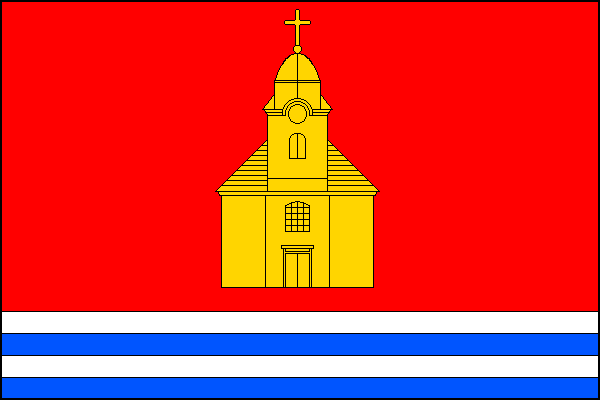
- Flag Coat of arms

- Location in the Czech Republic
- Coordinates: 50°7′46″N 15°1′27″E
- Country: Czech Republic
- Region: Central Bohemian
- District: Nymburk
- First mentioned: 1354

Area
  - Total: 8.65 km^{2} (3.34 sq mi)
- Elevation: 187 m (614 ft)

Population (2026-01-01)
  - Total: 986
  - Density: 114/km^{2} (295/sq mi)
- Time zone: UTC+1 (CET)
  - Summer (DST): UTC+2 (CEST)
- Postal code: 289 12
- Website: www.kostelni-lhota.cz

Kostelní Lhota is a municipality and village in Nymburk District in the Central Bohemian Region of the Czech Republic. It has about 1,000 inhabitants.

== Etymology ==
The name means 'church Lhota' in Czech.

== Geography ==
Kostelní Lhota is located about 6 kilometres (4 mi) south of Nymburk and 34 km (21 mi) east of Prague. It lies in a flat landscape in the Central Elbe Table. The Výrovka River flows along the eastern and northeastern municipal border. The Šembera River, its tributary, flows along the northwestern border.

== History ==
The first written mention of Kostelní Lhota is from 1354.

== Demographics ==
Historical population

Year	Pop.	±%
1869	805	—
1880	830	+3.1%
1890	833	+0.4%
1900	816	−2.0%
1910	919	+12.6%

Year	Pop.	±%
1921	938	+2.1%
1930	953	+1.6%
1950	836	−12.3%
1961	876	+4.8%
1970	832	−5.0%

Year	Pop.	±%
1980	767	−7.8%
1991	715	−6.8%
2001	724	+1.3%
2011	850	+17.4%
2021	853	+0.4%

Source: Censuses

== Transport ==
The D11 motorway (part of the European route E67) from Prague to Hradec Králové runs through the municipality.

== Sights ==
The main landmark of Kostelní Lhota is the Church of the Assumption of the Virgin Mary. It was built in the late Baroque style in 1817.

== Notable people ==
- Josef Musil (1932–2017), volleyball player
