= Uhlířské Janovice =

Town in Central Bohemian Region, Czech Republic

- Town
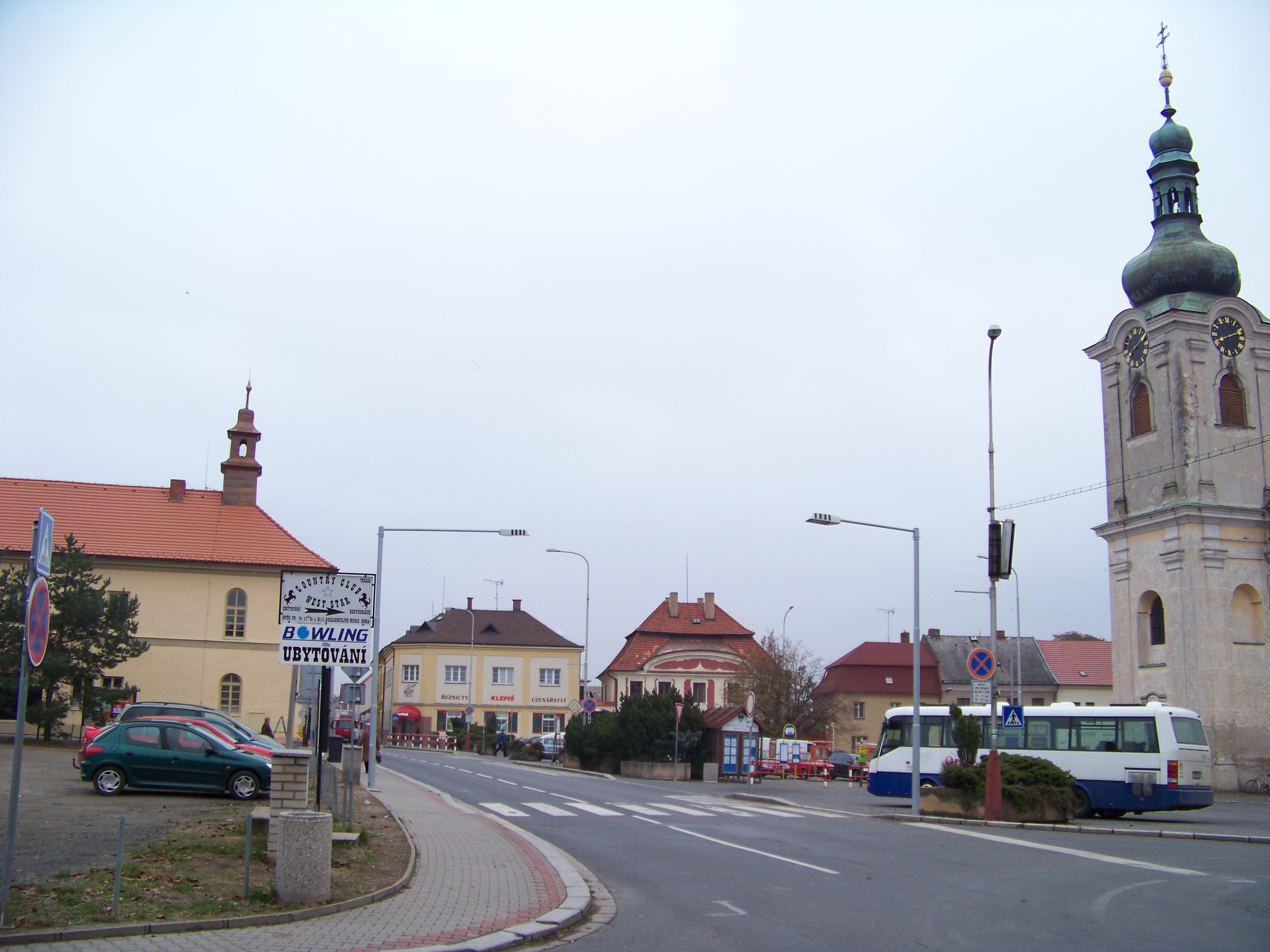
- The square Václavské náměstí

- Flag Coat of arms

- Location in the Czech Republic
- Coordinates: 49°52′52″N 15°3′52″E
- Country: Czech Republic
- Region: Central Bohemian
- District: Kutná Hora
- First mentioned: 1352

Government
  - Mayor: Petr Barták

Area
  - Total: 25.44 km^{2} (9.82 sq mi)
- Elevation: 423 m (1,388 ft)

Population (2026-01-01)
  - Total: 3,114
  - Density: 122.4/km^{2} (317.0/sq mi)
- Time zone: UTC+1 (CET)
  - Summer (DST): UTC+2 (CEST)
- Postal code: 285 04
- Website: www.uhlirskejanovice.cz

Uhlířské Janovice (Czech pronunciation: [ˈuɦliːr̝̊skɛː ˈjanovɪtsɛ]; German: Kohljanowitz) is a town in Kutná Hora District in the Central Bohemian Region of the Czech Republic. It has about 3,100 inhabitantas.

== Administrative division ==
Uhlířské Janovice consists of eight municipal parts (in brackets population according to the 2021 census):

- Uhlířské Janovice (2,830)
- Bláto (35)
- Janovická Lhota (83)
- Kochánov (11)
- Malejovice (11)
- Mitrov (54)
- Opatovice II (32)
- Silvánka (15)

== Etymology ==
The settlement was named Janovice after its founder Jan of Sternberg. The prefix Uhlířské was added to distinguish it from other places with the same name and refers to the charcoal burners (Czech: uhlíři) that lived here.

== Geography ==
Uhlířské Janovice is located about 16 kilometres (10 mi) southwest of Kutná Hora and 42 km (26 mi) southeast of Prague. It lies in the Upper Sázava Hills. The highest point is the hill Dračí skála at 516 m (1,693 ft) above sea level. The Výrovka River originates here and flows across the municipal territory.

== History ==
The first written mention of Uhlířské Janovice is from 1352. It was founded by Jan of Sternberg, probably in 1250. The town was owned by the Sternberg family until 1750, when it was merged with the Rataje estate.

== Demographics ==
Historical population

Year	Pop.	±%
1869	3,270	—
1880	3,301	+0.9%
1890	3,158	−4.3%
1900	3,119	−1.2%
1910	3,162	+1.4%

Year	Pop.	±%
1921	2,942	−7.0%
1930	2,946	+0.1%
1950	2,487	−15.6%
1961	2,710	+9.0%
1970	2,689	−0.8%

Year	Pop.	±%
1980	3,010	+11.9%
1991	2,956	−1.8%
2001	3,077	+4.1%
2011	3,046	−1.0%
2021	3,071	+0.8%

Source: Censuses

== Transport ==
Uhlířské Janovice is located on the railway line Kolín–Ledečko.

== Sights ==
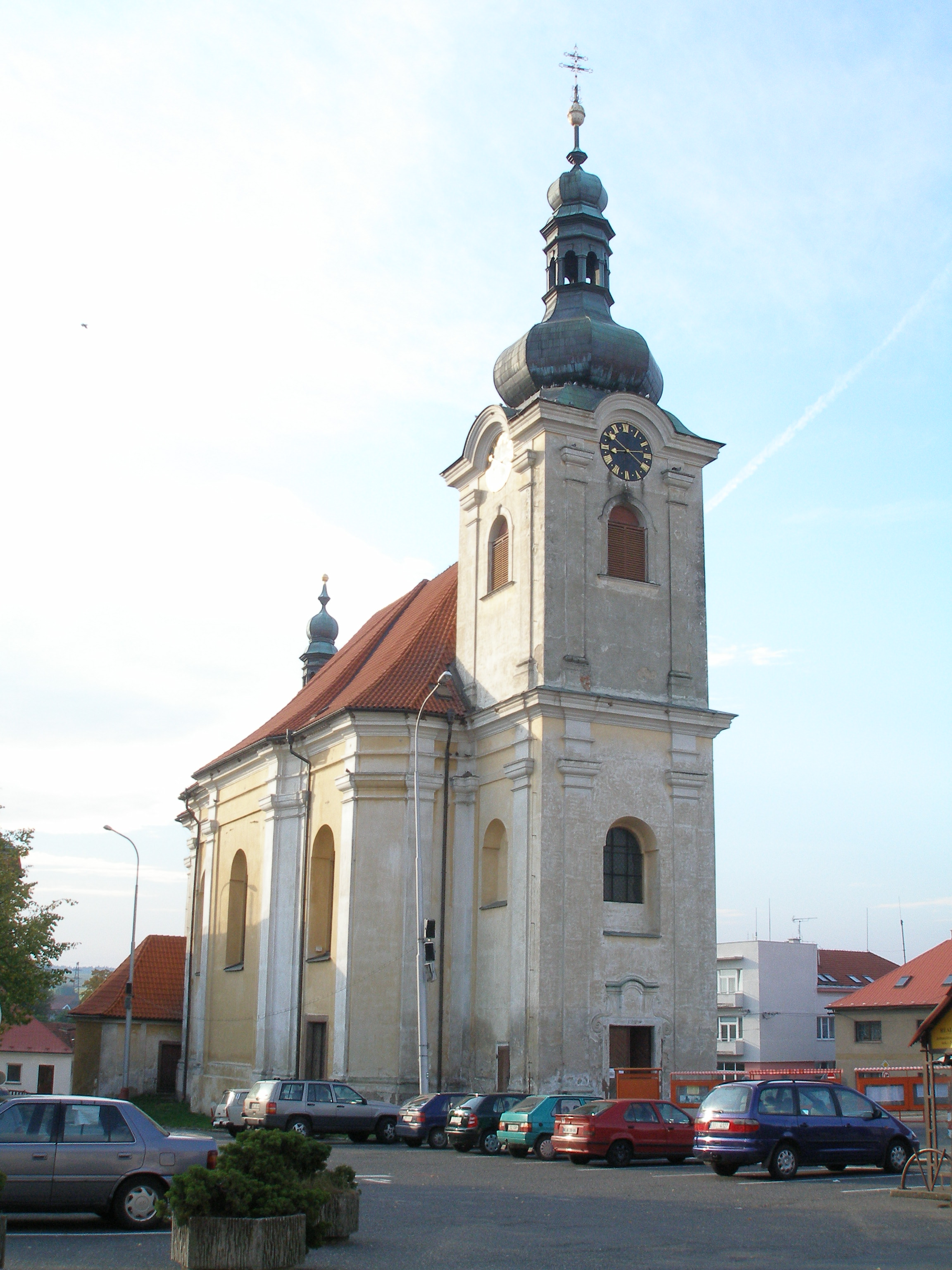
Church of Saint Aloysius

There are three churches. The main landmark of the town square is the Church of Saint Aloysius. It was built in the late Baroque style in 1767–1795.

The Church of Saint Giles dates from the late 12th or early 13th century. It is a small Romanesque-Gothic church, which lost its function after the new church was built on the square.

The Church of Saint George in Malejovice is originally an early Gothic building, which probably dates from the 13th century. Baroque modifications were made in 1713.

The former synagogue dates from 1798. Today the building is used as the prayer house of the Czechoslovak Hussite Church.

The town hall on the town square dates from 1786.

== Notable people ==
- Friedrich Ritter von Friedländer-Malheim (1825–1901), Bohemian-Austrian painter
