= Toušice =

- Municipality
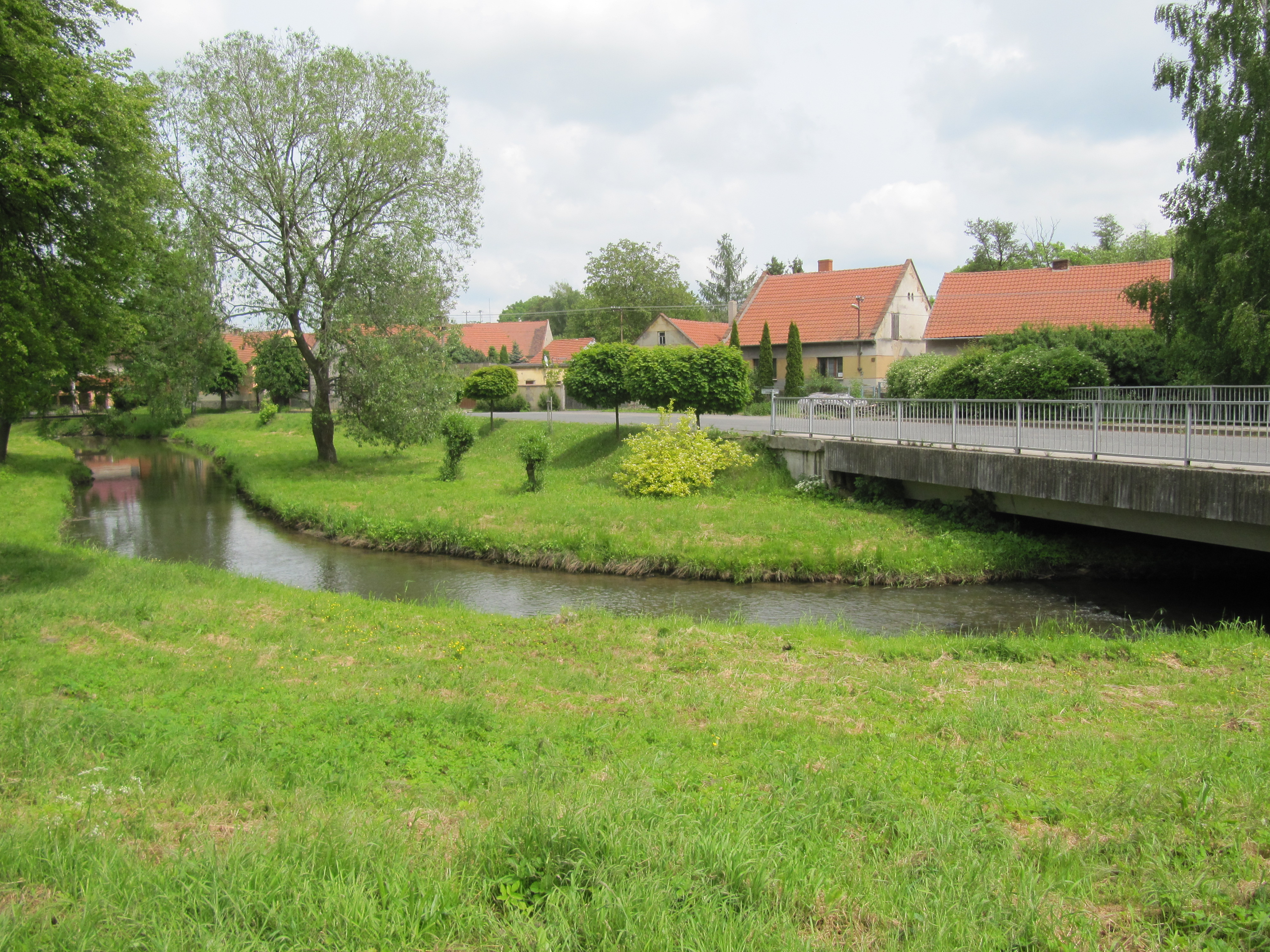
- The Výrovka River in Toušice

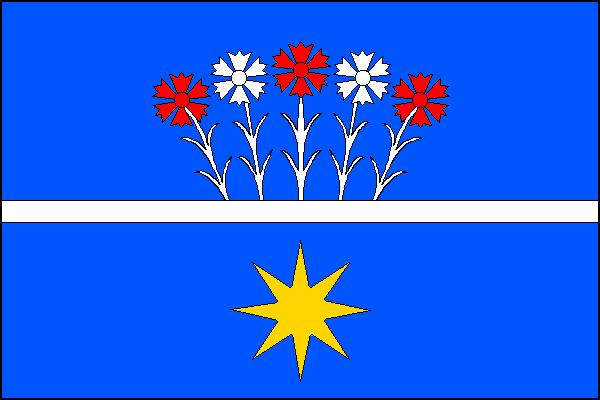
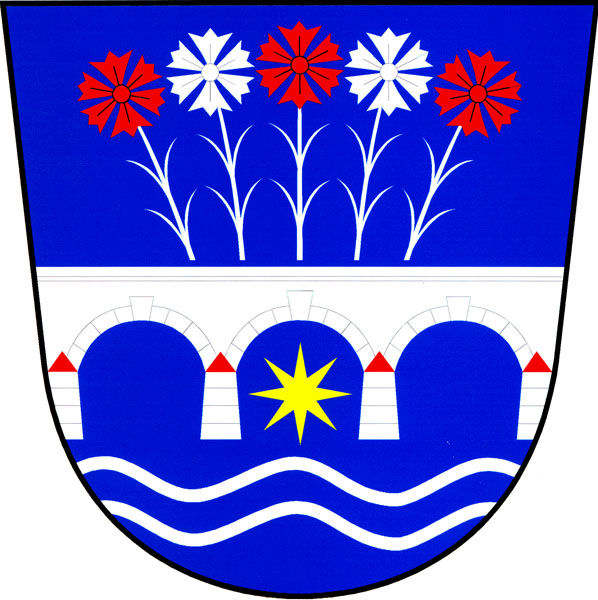
- Flag Coat of arms

- Location in the Czech Republic
- Coordinates: 49°59′17″N 15°0′24″E
- Country: Czech Republic
- Region: Central Bohemian
- District: Kolín
- First mentioned: 1207

Area
  - Total: 7.18 km^{2} (2.77 sq mi)
- Elevation: 253 m (830 ft)

Population (2026-01-01)
  - Total: 383
  - Density: 53.3/km^{2} (138/sq mi)
- Time zone: UTC+1 (CET)
  - Summer (DST): UTC+2 (CEST)
- Postal codes: 281 44, 281 63
- Website: www.tousice.cz

Toušice is a municipality and village in Kolín District in the Central Bohemian Region of the Czech Republic. It has about 400 inhabitants.

== Administrative division ==
Toušice consists of two municipal parts (in brackets population according to the 2021 census):

- Toušice (216)
- Mlékovice (336)

== Demographics ==
Historical population
Year	Pop.	±%
1869	493	—
1880	545	+10.5%
1890	606	+11.2%
1900	603	−0.5%
1910	639	+6.0%
1921	637	−0.3%
1930	621	−2.5%
1950	494	−20.5%
1961	449	−9.1%
1970	378	−15.8%
1980	318	−15.9%
1991	272	−14.5%
2001	295	+8.5%
2011	318	+7.8%
2021	552	+73.6%
Source: Censuses
