= Radim (Kolín District) =

- Municipality
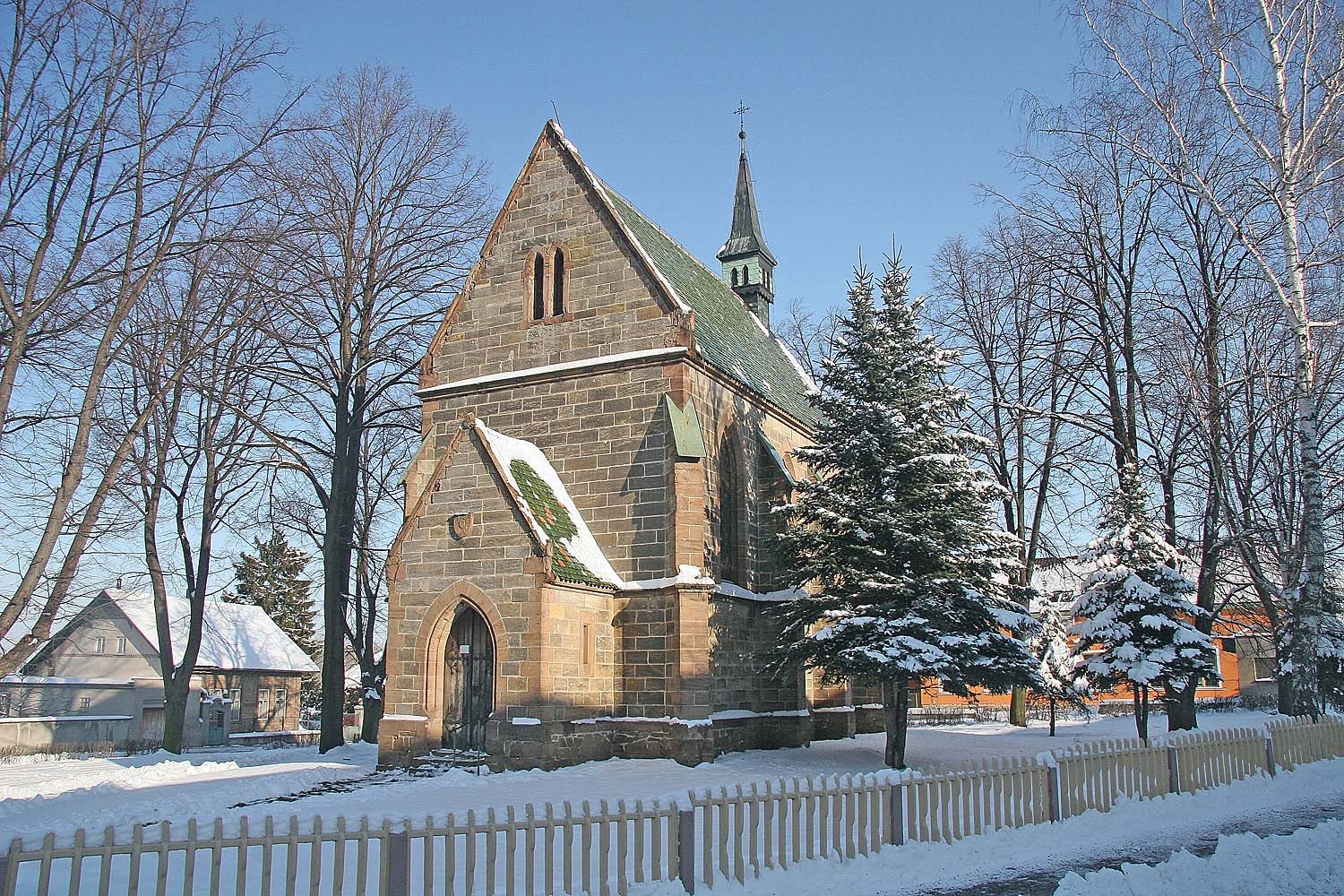
- Chapel of Christ the Redeemer

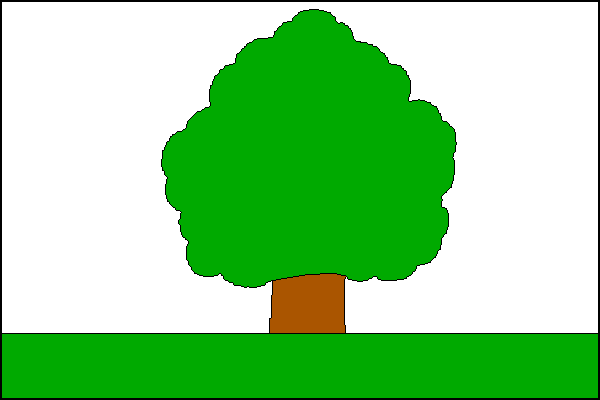
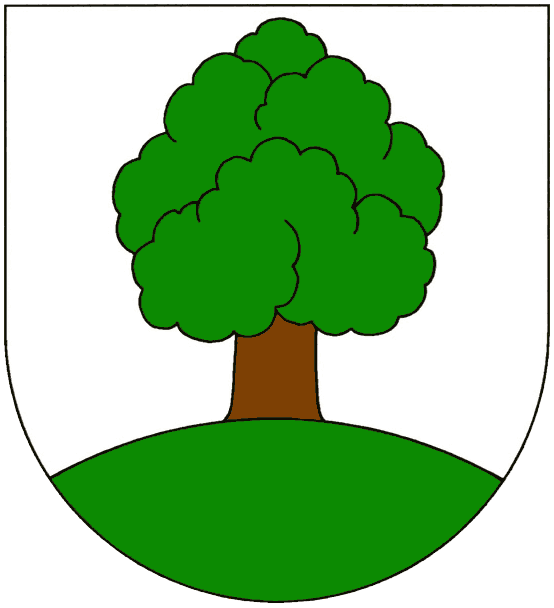
- Flag Coat of arms

- Location in the Czech Republic
- Coordinates: 50°4′12″N 15°0′45″E
- Country: Czech Republic
- Region: Central Bohemian
- District: Kolín
- First mentioned: 1320

Area
  - Total: 5.03 km^{2} (1.94 sq mi)
- Elevation: 205 m (673 ft)

Population (2026-01-01)
  - Total: 1,206
  - Density: 240/km^{2} (621/sq mi)
- Time zone: UTC+1 (CET)
  - Summer (DST): UTC+2 (CEST)
- Postal code: 281 03
- Website: www.obecradim.cz

Radim is a municipality and village in Kolín District in the Central Bohemian Region of the Czech Republic. It has about 1,200 inhabitants.

== Etymology ==
The name is derived from the personal name Radim, meaning "Radim's (court)".

== Geography ==
Radim is located about 13 kilometres (8 mi) west of Kolín and 34 km (21 mi) east of Prague. It lies in the Central Elbe Table. The highest point is the hill Radim at 268 m (879 ft) above sea level. The Výrovka River flows through the municipality.

== History ==
The first written mention of Radim is from 1320. It was owned by various lower noblemen. In 1541, Radi mwas bought by the Zároba of Hustířany family, who had built here the castle. Their properties were confiscated after 1620 as a result of the Battle of White Mountain. In 1632–1676, Radim was a property of the Berchtold family. Among the next notable owners of the estate were the noble families of Schlick (1721–1750), Kinsky (1750–1783) and Liechtenstein (1783–1918).

== Demographics ==
Historical population

Year	Pop.	±%
1869	742	—
1880	795	+7.1%
1890	930	+17.0%
1900	1,003	+7.8%
1910	1,026	+2.3%

Year	Pop.	±%
1921	1,022	−0.4%
1930	1,225	+19.9%
1950	932	−23.9%
1961	971	+4.2%
1970	956	−1.5%

Year	Pop.	±%
1980	884	−7.5%
1991	865	−2.1%
2001	943	+9.0%
2011	1,114	+18.1%
2021	1,192	+7.0%

Source: Censuses

== Transport ==
Radim is located on the railway line of local importance from Kouřim to Pečky.

== Sights ==
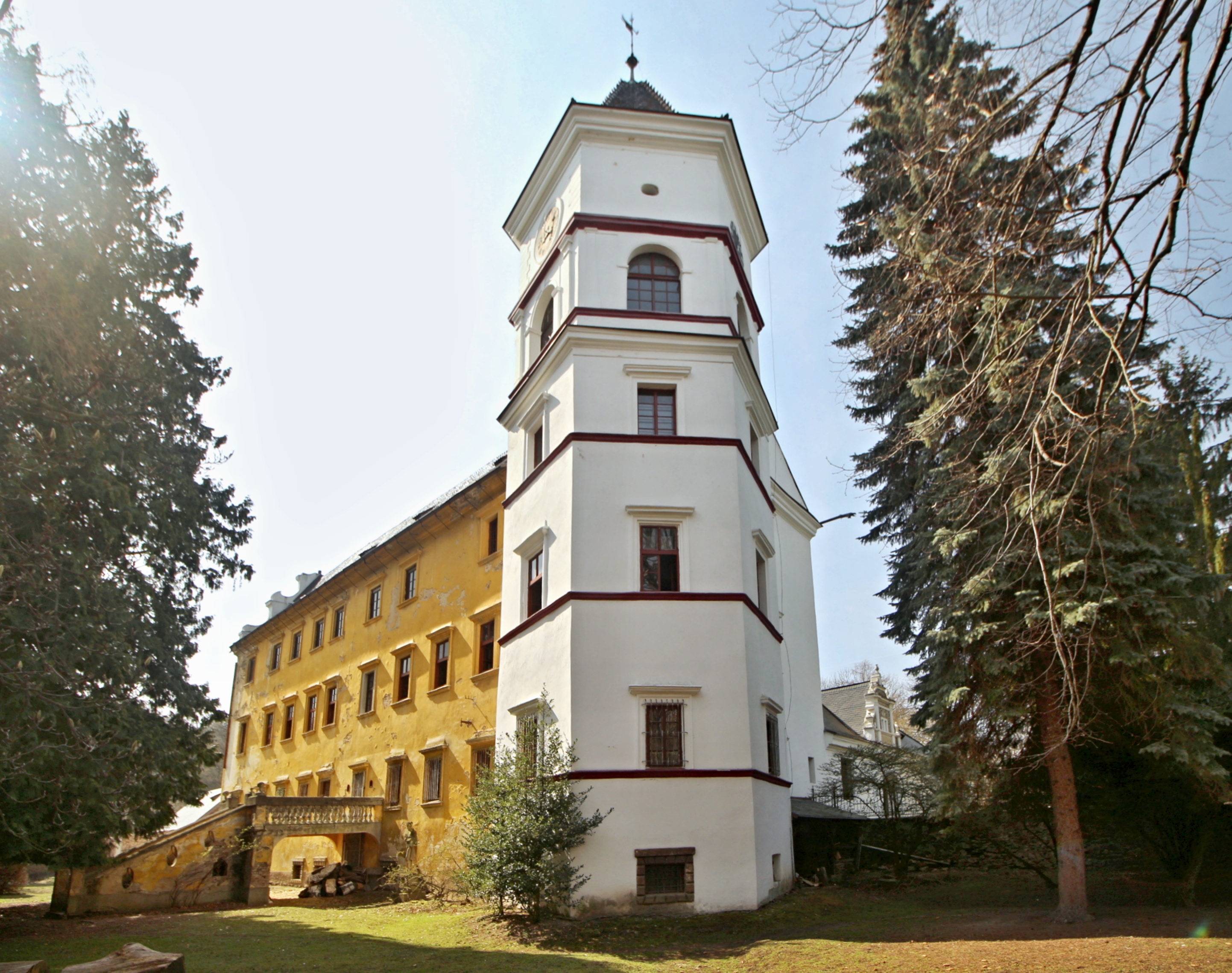
Radim Castle

The main landmark is the Radim Castle. It was built in the Renaissance style in 1608, on the site of an old fortress. It is surrounded by a park. Today the castle is privately owned, but is open to the public.

A notable building is the Chapel of Christ the Redeemer. It was built in the neo-Gothic style in 1891–1892 according to the design by Josef Mocker.
