= Kouřim =

- Town
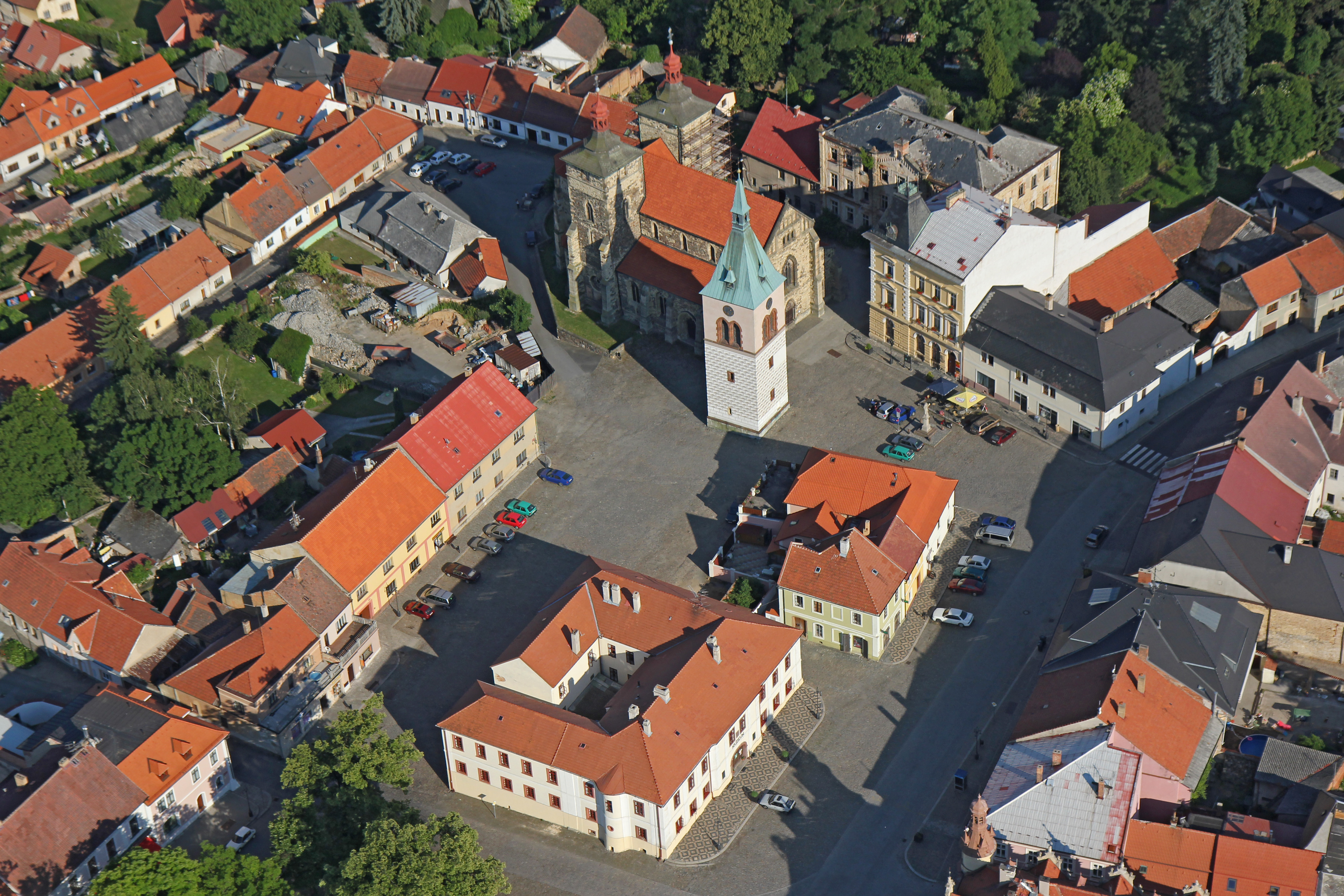
- Main square

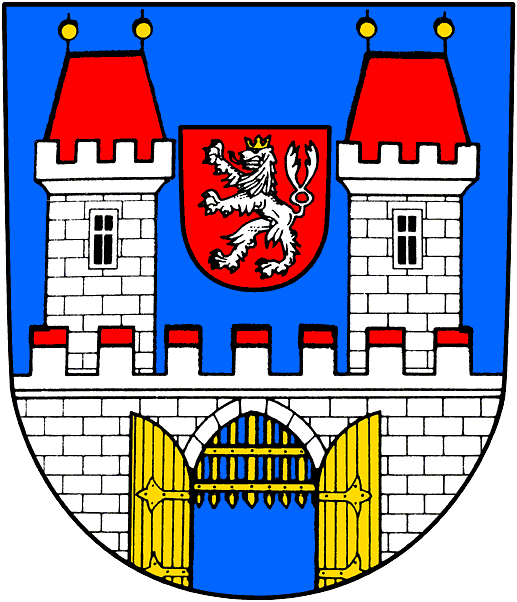
- Coat of arms

- Location in the Czech Republic
- Coordinates: 50°0′11″N 14°58′38″E
- Country: Czech Republic
- Region: Central Bohemian
- District: Kolín
- First mentioned: 1261

Government
  - Mayor: Luboš Čepelák

Area
  - Total: 14.40 km^{2} (5.56 sq mi)
- Elevation: 268 m (879 ft)

Population (2026-01-01)
  - Total: 1,981
  - Density: 137.6/km^{2} (356.3/sq mi)
- Time zone: UTC+1 (CET)
  - Summer (DST): UTC+2 (CEST)
- Postal code: 281 61
- Website: www.mestokourim.cz

Kouřim (Czech pronunciation: [ˈkour̝ɪm]; German: Kaurzim, Kaurzin, Kaurim) is a town in Kolín District in the Central Bohemian Region of the Czech Republic. It has about 2,000 inhabitants. The town is located on the Výrovka River in the Central Elbe Table.

Kouřim was founded in the first half of the 13th century. The historic town centre is well preserved and is protected as an urban monument zone. The town is known for the best-preserved medieval town walls in the Czech Republic, which are protected as a national cultural monument. Among the other significant landmarks of Kouřim is the Church of Saint Stephen.

== Administrative division ==
Kouřim consists of two municipal parts (in brackets population according to the 2021 census):

- Kouřim (1,901)
- Molitorov (69)

== Etymology ==
There are two theories about the origin of the name. Either it was derived from the personal name Kouřim, similar to how the names of the nearby localities Vlašim and Radim arose. According to the second theory, the name was derived from the Czech word kouřit ('to smoke') and originally referred to a mountain that "smoked" (from which water evaporated after rains).

== Geography ==
Kouřim is located about 15 kilometres (9 mi) west of Kolín and 31 km (19 mi) east of Prague. It lies in a flat agricultural landscape in the Central Elbe Table. The Výrovka River flows through the town.

The astronomical centre of Europe is located in the territory of Kouřim. It is marked by a monument. It is used for astronomical calculations, e.g. to determine the Central European time zone and the sunrise and sunset in the Czech Republic.

== History ==
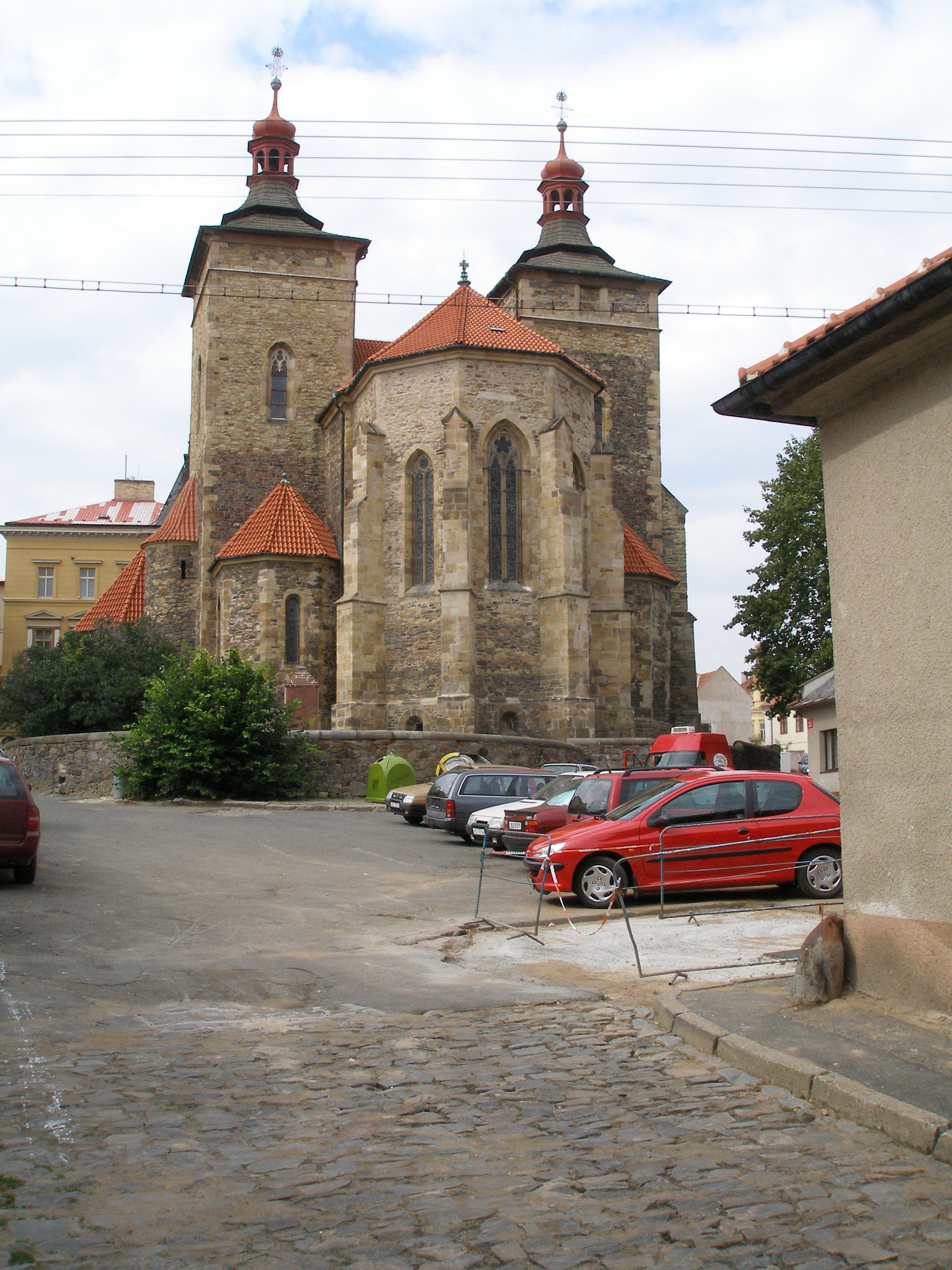
Church of Saint Stephen

The first written mention of Kouřim is in a deed of King Ottokar II from 1261. The royal town of Kouřim was probably founded by King Wenceslaus I between 1223 and 1250. At the turn of the 15th and 16th centuries, the town experienced an unprecedented prosperity, and at the end of the 16th century, there were over 2,000 inhabitants (which is more than today).

A great disaster for the town was the Thirty Years' War, which ended Kouřim's status as one of the most important towns in the Kingdom of Bohemia. The population declined by 75% and it lost the town privileges until 1740, when they were renewed by Emperor Charles VI.

In 1881, the railway to Pečky was built. At the end of the 19th century, Kouřim had about 3,000 inhabitants at its peak. In the 20th century, especially at the end of the 1960s, the town stagnated and has become a periphery. It completely lost its cultural identity, which was originally determined by an extremely strong historical tradition. Thanks to this, however, the town has preserved its genius loci, which has become an advantage for tourism and filmmaking.

== Demographics ==
Historical population

Year	Pop.	±%
1869	2,780	—
1880	3,174	+14.2%
1890	3,333	+5.0%
1900	3,130	−6.1%
1910	2,976	−4.9%

Year	Pop.	±%
1921	2,875	−3.4%
1930	2,683	−6.7%
1950	2,400	−10.5%
1961	2,386	−0.6%
1970	1,998	−16.3%

Year	Pop.	±%
1980	1,839	−8.0%
1991	1,799	−2.2%
2001	1,769	−1.7%
2011	1,893	+7.0%
2021	1,970	+4.1%

Source: Censuses

== Transport ==
Kouřim is the terminus and start of a short railway line of local importance heading from/to Pečky.

== Sights ==
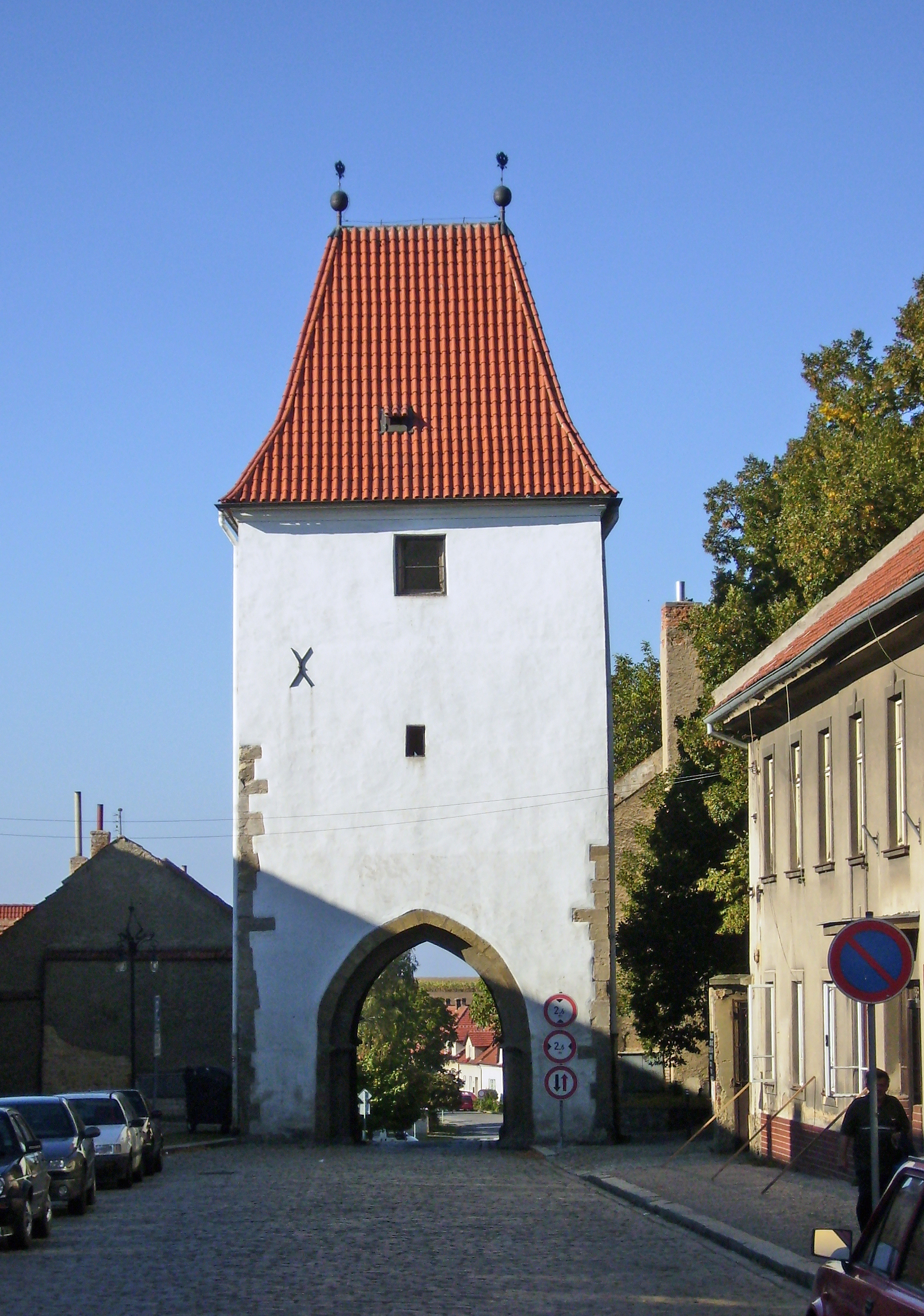
Prague Gate

Stará Kouřim ('old Kouřim') are remains of a gord of the Slavník dynasty on a hill east of town. It dates from the 9th or 10th century. With an area of 44 ha (110 acres), it was one of the largest fortified settlements in period from the late Stone Age to the early Middle Ages. An educational trail leads through the remains of the gord. Archaeological finds from the site are on display in the Kouřim Museum.

The Church of Saint Stephen dates from the second half of the 13th century. It is a prominent example of the early Gothic architecture.

Town walls in Kouřim date from the 13th–16th century. It the most valuable fortification system in the Czech Republic and the only one, which is protected as a national cultural monument. The walls are 1,250 metres (4,100 ft) long in circumference. In addition to a large part of the walls, one of the four original gates, called the Prague Gate, has been preserved. The other three were demolished in 1840–1876. It is considered to be the best preserved early Gothic town gate in the Czech Republic and one of the best preserved town gates in Europe.

The open-air museum in Kouřim shows various regional types of vernacular architecture from the 17th to the 19th century. The museum is administered by the Regional Museum in Kolín.

== In popular culture ==
Kouřim is a popular place for filmmakers. Films and TV series shot here include Nesmrtelná teta (1993), Bylo nás pět (1995), A Knight's Tale (2001), The Old Blunderbuss Mystery (2011), Cirkus Bukowsky (2013), Patrimony (2018) and Hastrman (2018).

== Notable people ==
- František Vejdovský (1849–1939), zoologist
- Evžen Linhart (1898–1949), architect and designer
