= Zvěřínek =

- Municipality
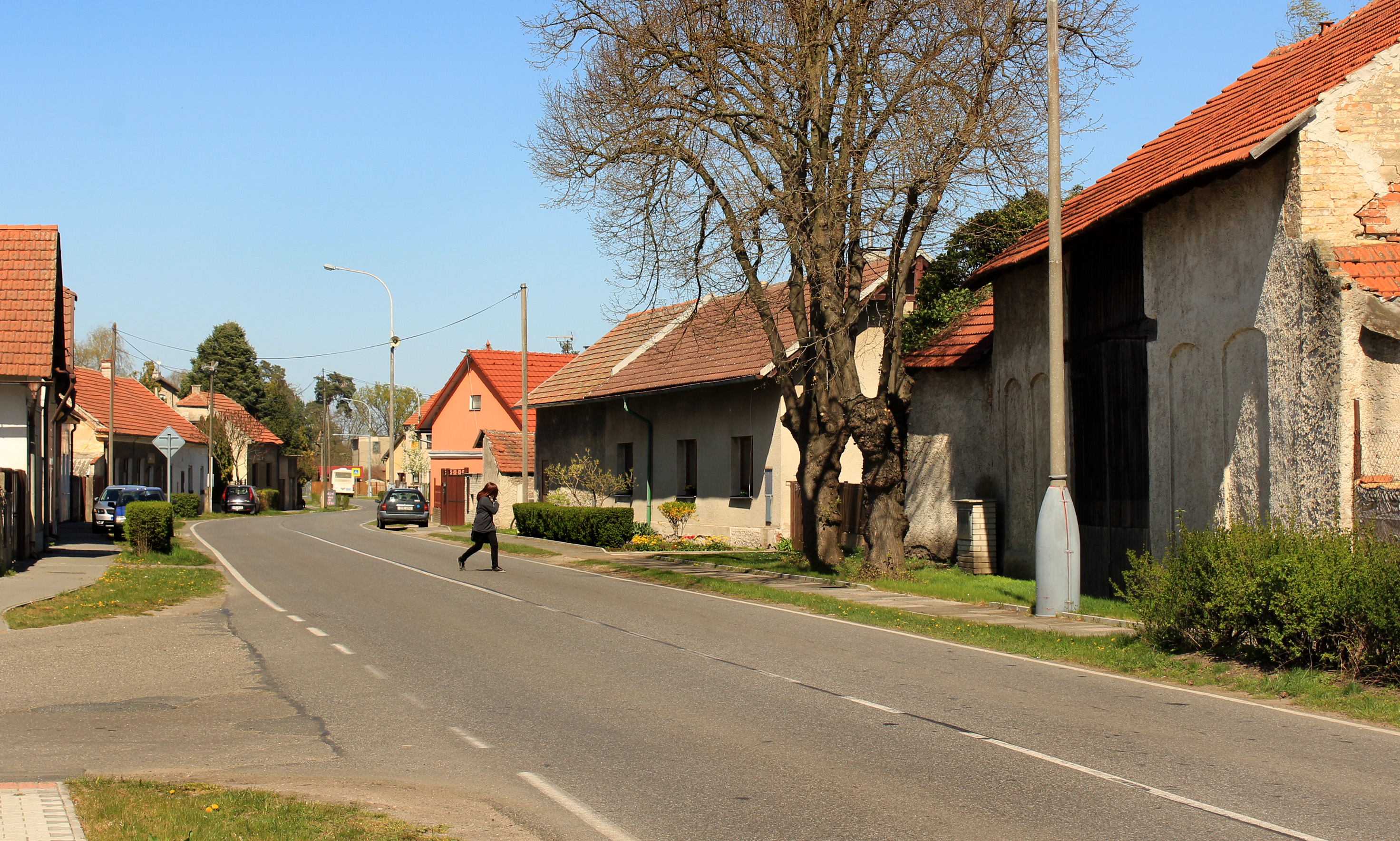
- Main road

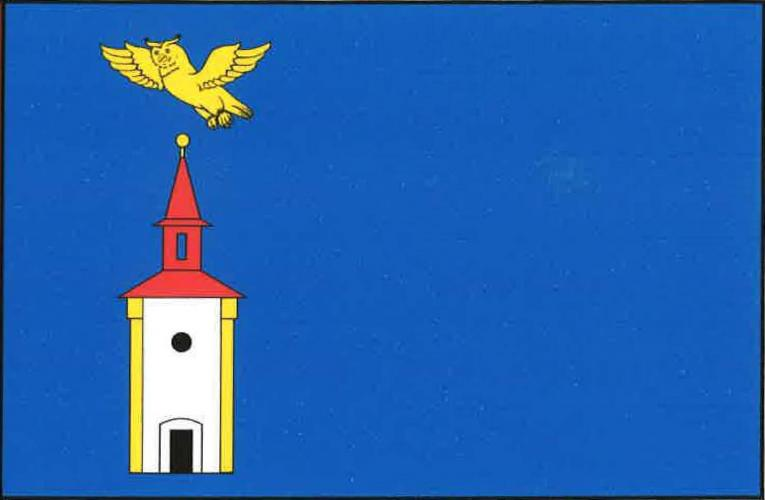
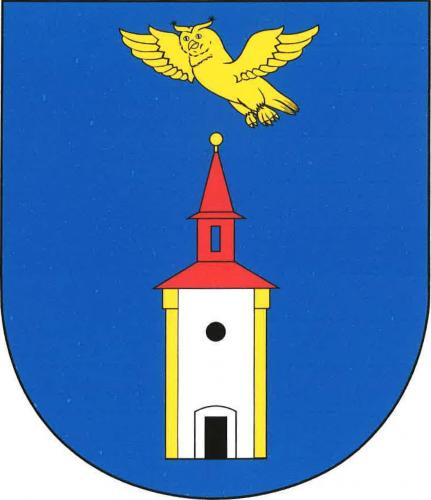
- Flag Coat of arms

- Location in the Czech Republic
- Coordinates: 50°9′12″N 15°0′21″E
- Country: Czech Republic
- Region: Central Bohemian
- District: Nymburk
- First mentioned: 1345

Area
  - Total: 2.06 km^{2} (0.80 sq mi)
- Elevation: 184 m (604 ft)

Population (2026-01-01)
  - Total: 317
  - Density: 154/km^{2} (399/sq mi)
- Time zone: UTC+1 (CET)
  - Summer (DST): UTC+2 (CEST)
- Postal code: 289 13
- Website: www.zverinek.cz

Zvěřínek is a municipality and village in Nymburk District in the Central Bohemian Region of the Czech Republic. It has about 300 inhabitants.

== Demographics ==
Historical population
Year	Pop.	±%
1869	194	—
1880	238	+22.7%
1890	248	+4.2%
1900	223	−10.1%
1910	226	+1.3%
1921	238	+5.3%
1930	254	+6.7%
1950	276	+8.7%
1961	314	+13.8%
1970	293	−6.7%
1980	242	−17.4%
1991	218	−9.9%
2001	214	−1.8%
2011	247	+15.4%
2021	312	+26.3%
Source: Censuses
