= Písková Lhota (Mladá Boleslav District) =

- Municipality
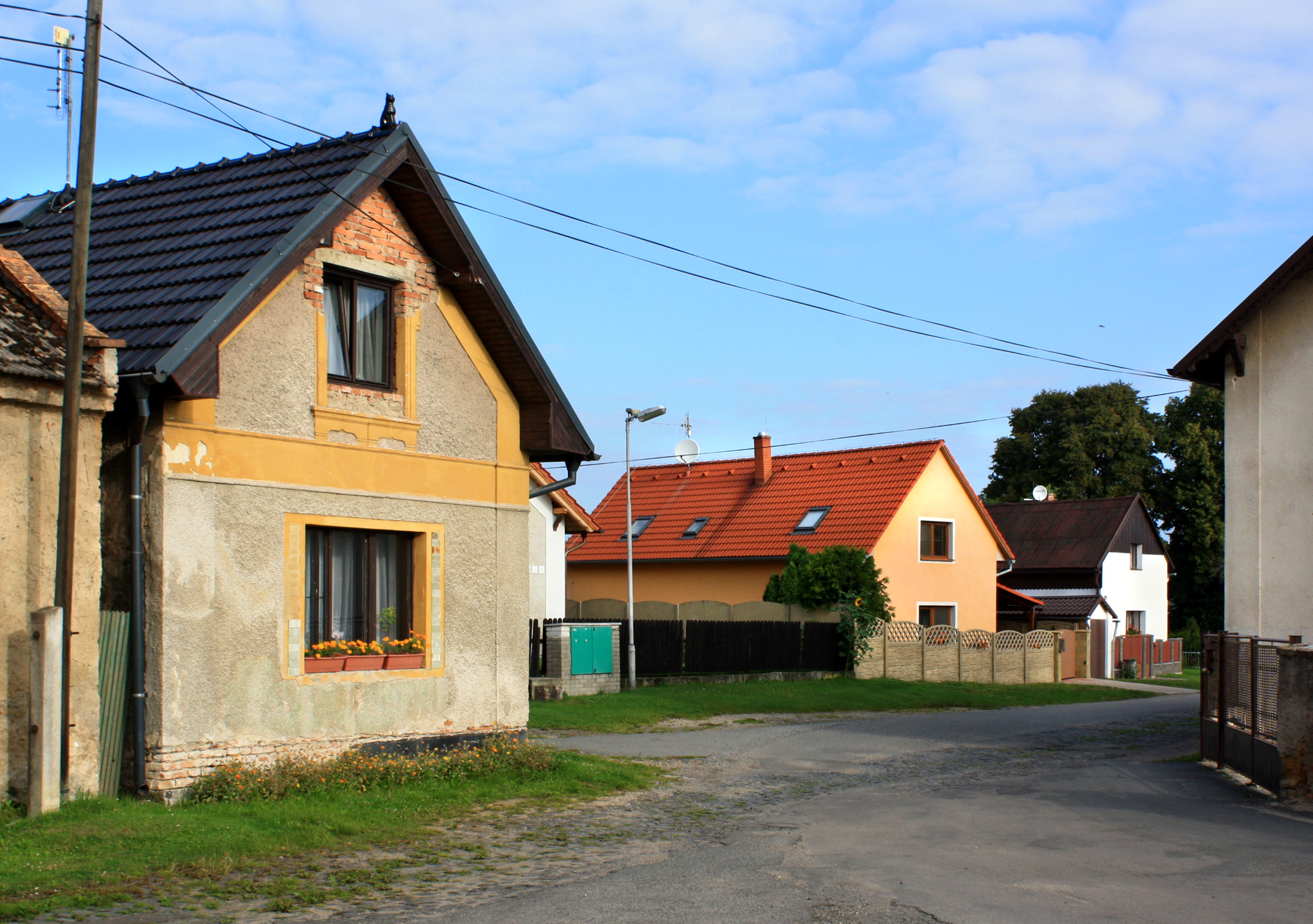
- Common in Písková Lhota

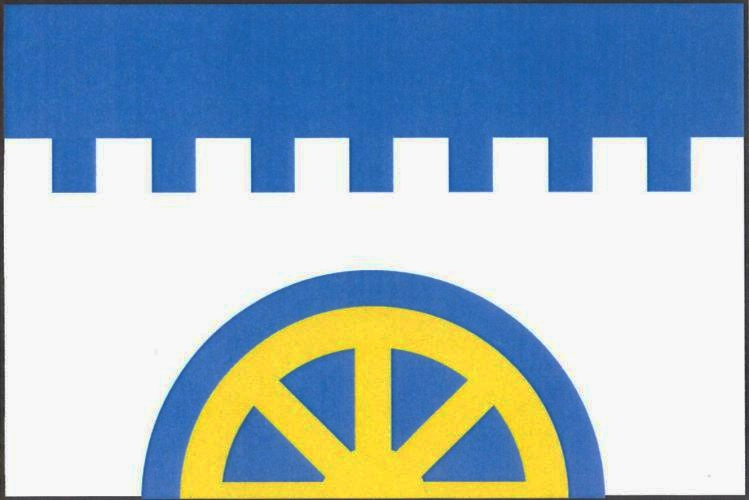
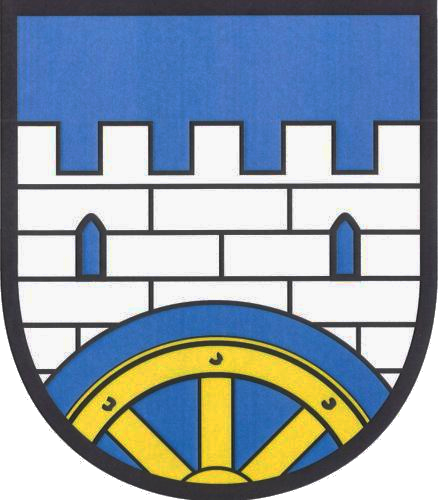
- Flag Coat of arms

- Location in the Czech Republic
- Coordinates: 50°22′3″N 14°52′20″E
- Country: Czech Republic
- Region: Central Bohemian
- District: Mladá Boleslav
- First mentioned: 1398

Area
  - Total: 4.68 km^{2} (1.81 sq mi)
- Elevation: 249 m (817 ft)

Population (2026-01-01)
  - Total: 1,111
  - Density: 237/km^{2} (615/sq mi)
- Time zone: UTC+1 (CET)
  - Summer (DST): UTC+2 (CEST)
- Postal code: 294 31
- Website: www.piskovalhota.cz

Písková Lhota is a municipality and village in Mladá Boleslav District in the Central Bohemian Region of the Czech Republic. It has about 1,100 inhabitants.

== Administrative division ==
Písková Lhota consists of two municipal parts (in brackets population according to the 2021 census):

- Písková Lhota (872)
- Zámostí (158)

== Etymology ==
The name means 'sandy Lhota' in Czech.

== Geography ==
Písková Lhota is located about 6 kilometres (4 mi) south of Mladá Boleslav and 39 km (24 mi) northeast of Prague. It lies in the Jizera Table. The municipality is situated on the left bank of the Jizera River, which forms the western municipal border. There is a fishpond in the centre of the village.

== History ==
The first written mention of Písková Lhota is from 1398, Zámostí was first mentioned in 1361. Starý Stránov Castle was first documented in 1297. Písková Lhota was a typical agricultural village, while Zámostí was probably a village of craftsmen.

== Demographics ==
Historical population

Year	Pop.	±%
1869	534	—
1880	597	+11.8%
1890	593	−0.7%
1900	691	+16.5%
1910	695	+0.6%

Year	Pop.	±%
1921	637	−8.3%
1930	770	+20.9%
1950	660	−14.3%
1961	640	−3.0%
1970	609	−4.8%

Year	Pop.	±%
1980	499	−18.1%
1991	492	−1.4%
2001	539	+9.6%
2011	710	+31.7%
2021	1,030	+45.1%

Source: Censuses

== Transport ==
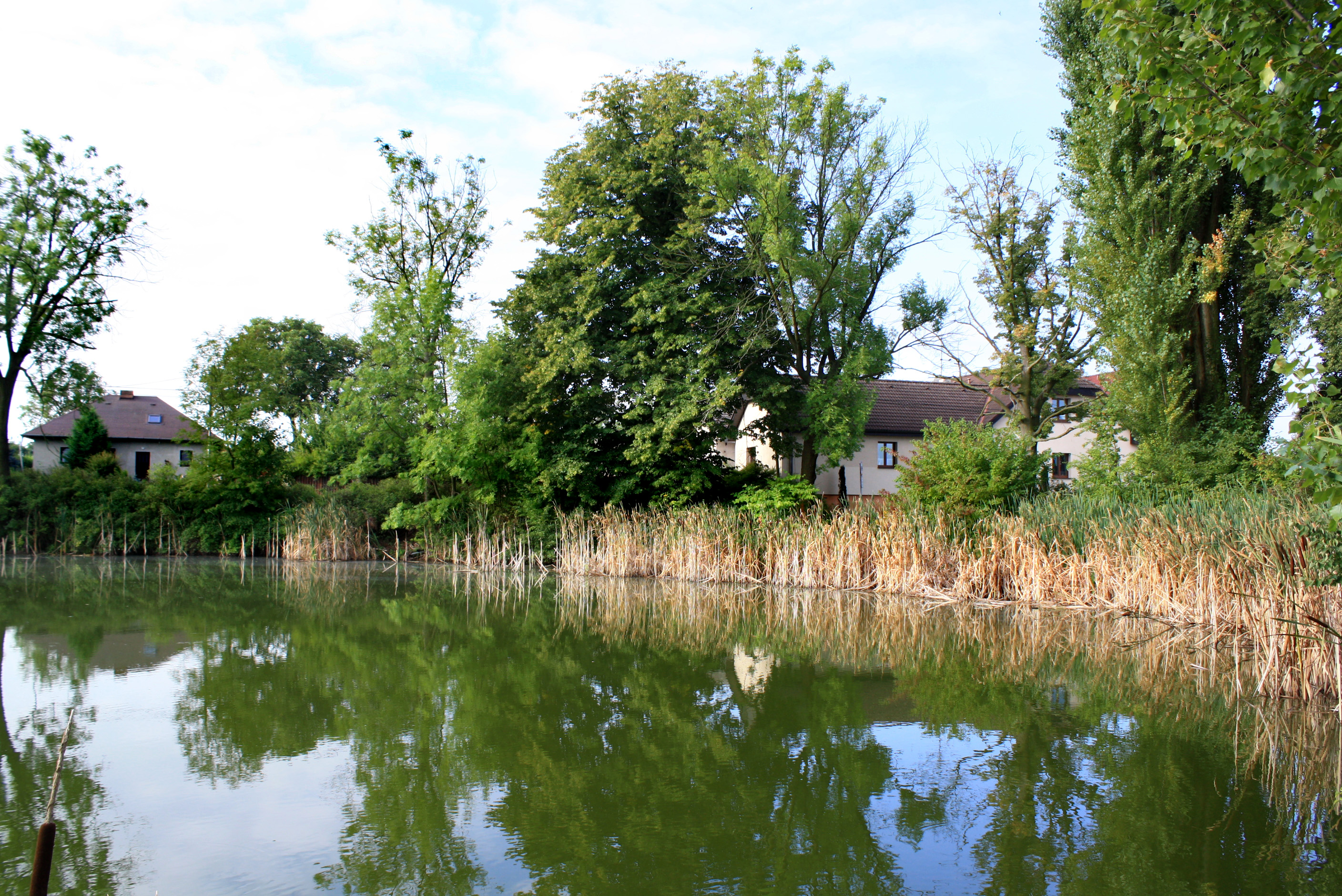
Local pond

The D10 motorway from Prague to Turnov runs through the municipality.

== Sights ==
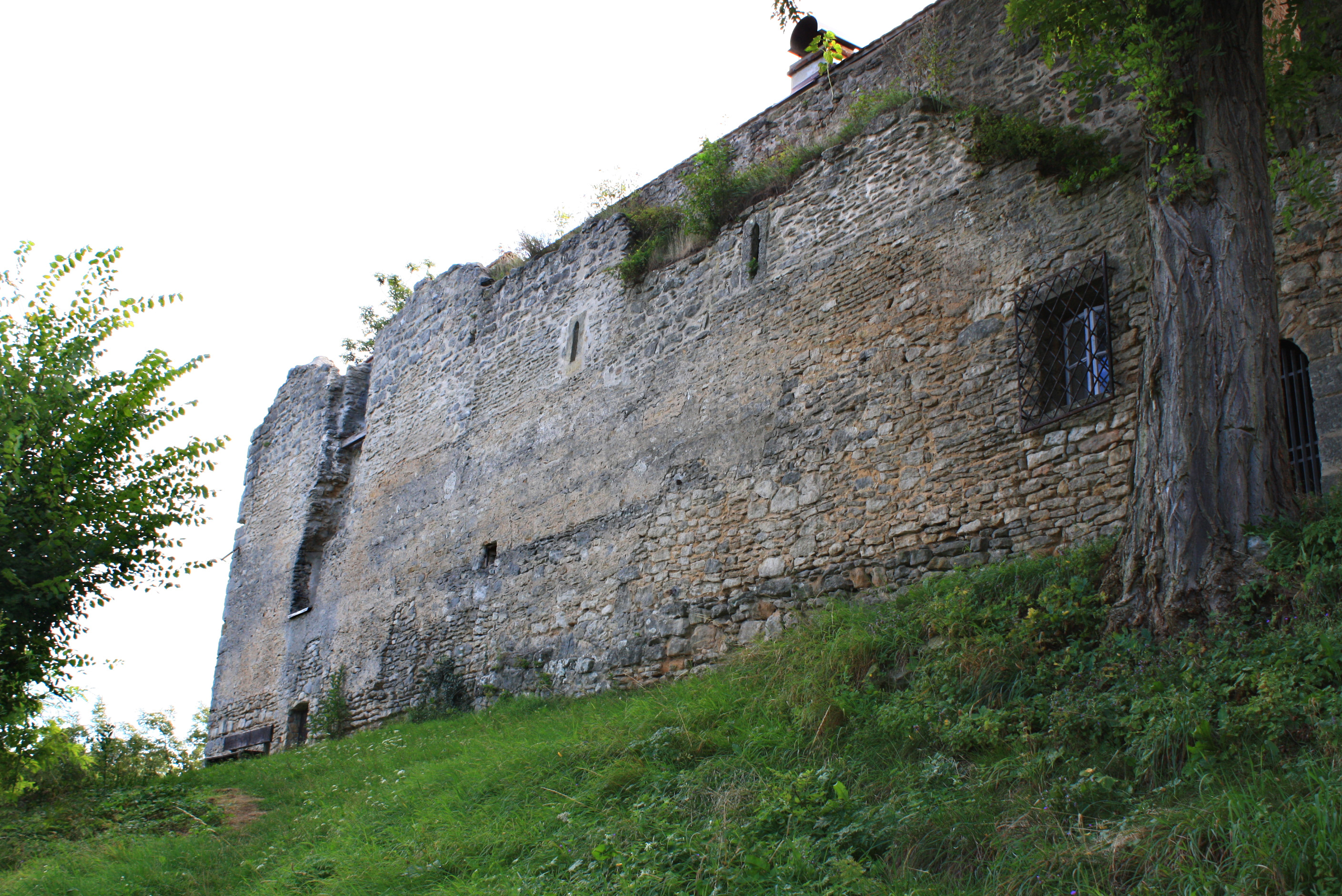
Starý Stránov Castle

The most important monument is the ruin of the Starý Stránov Castle. Several houses were built into the ruins, for the construction of which building material from the castle was used.

Among the other monuments in Písková Lhota are a small Jewish cemetery and a Baroque building of a former inn from the mid-18th century.
