= Kostomlátky =

- Municipality
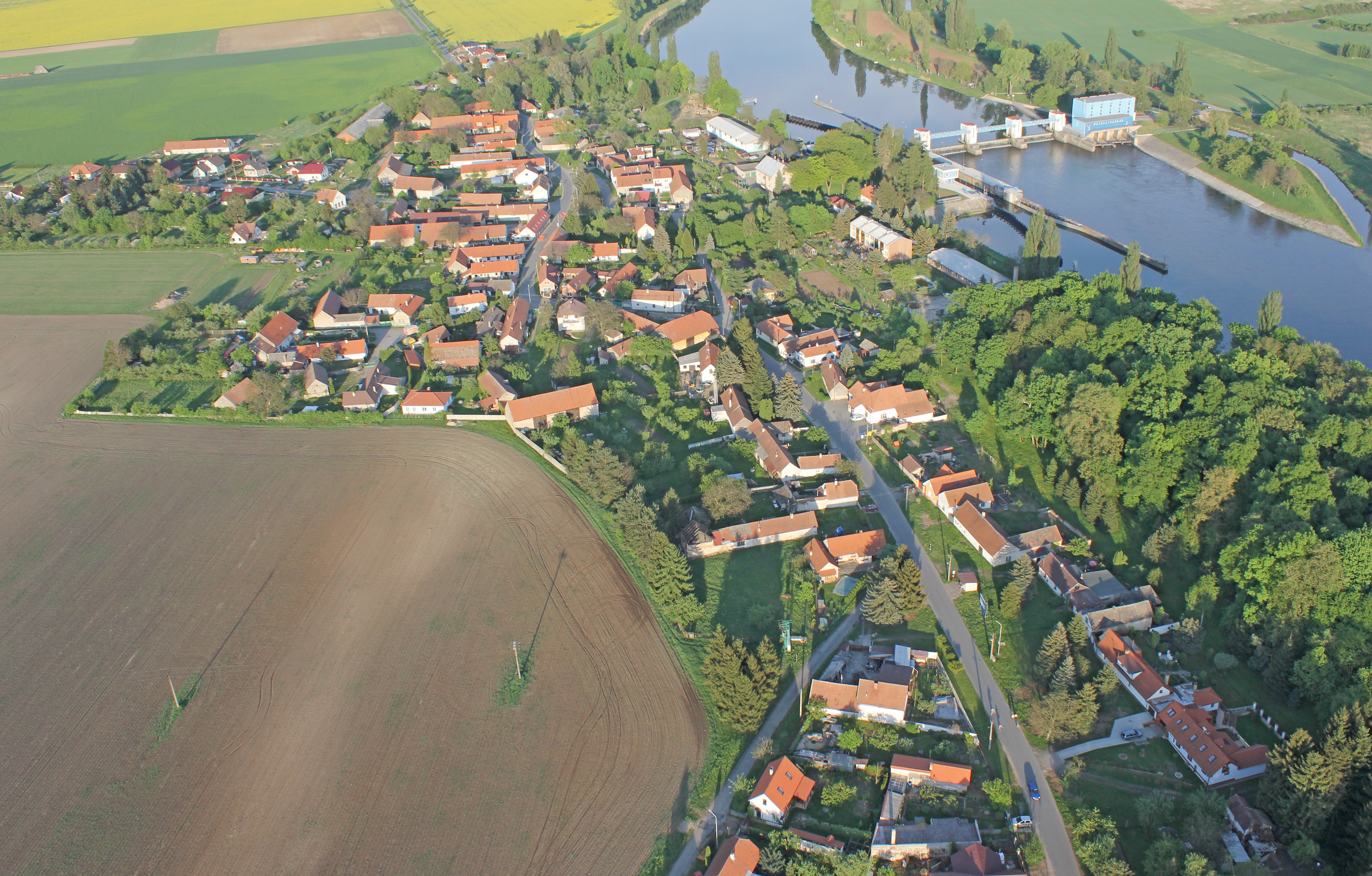
- Aerial view

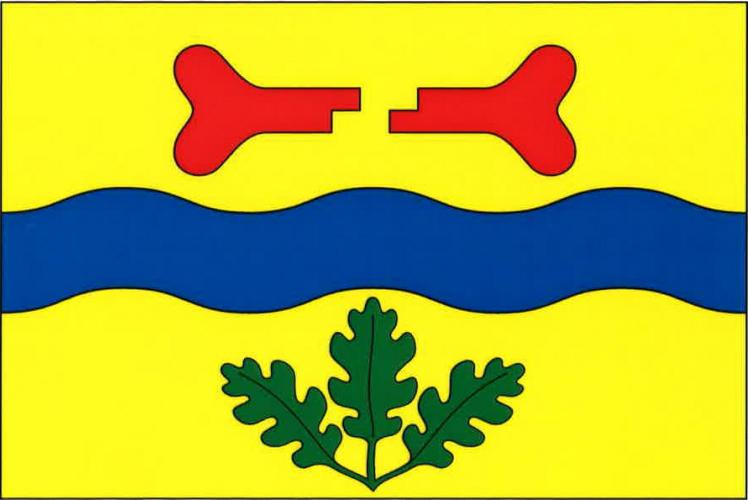
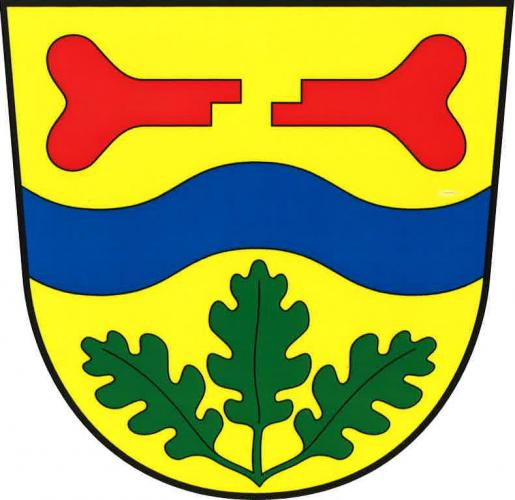
- Flag Coat of arms

- Location in the Czech Republic
- Coordinates: 50°10′16″N 14°59′3″E
- Country: Czech Republic
- Region: Central Bohemian
- District: Nymburk
- First mentioned: 1495

Area
  - Total: 5.74 km^{2} (2.22 sq mi)
- Elevation: 182 m (597 ft)

Population (2026-01-01)
  - Total: 328
  - Density: 57.1/km^{2} (148/sq mi)
- Time zone: UTC+1 (CET)
  - Summer (DST): UTC+2 (CEST)
- Postal code: 289 21
- Website: www.kostomlatky.cz

Kostomlátky is a municipality and village in Nymburk District in the Central Bohemian Region of the Czech Republic. It has about 300 inhabitants.

== Administrative division ==
Kostomlátky consists of two municipal parts (in brackets population according to the 2021 census):

- Kostomlátky (227)
- Doubrava (103)

== Demographics ==
Historical population
Year	Pop.	±%
1869	519	—
1880	582	+12.1%
1890	548	−5.8%
1900	541	−1.3%
1910	566	+4.6%
1921	561	−0.9%
1930	505	−10.0%
1950	383	−24.2%
1961	398	+3.9%
1970	359	−9.8%
1980	339	−5.6%
1991	250	−26.3%
2001	227	−9.2%
2011	255	+12.3%
2021	330	+29.4%
Source: Censuses
