= Křovák's projection =

Czech mapping system

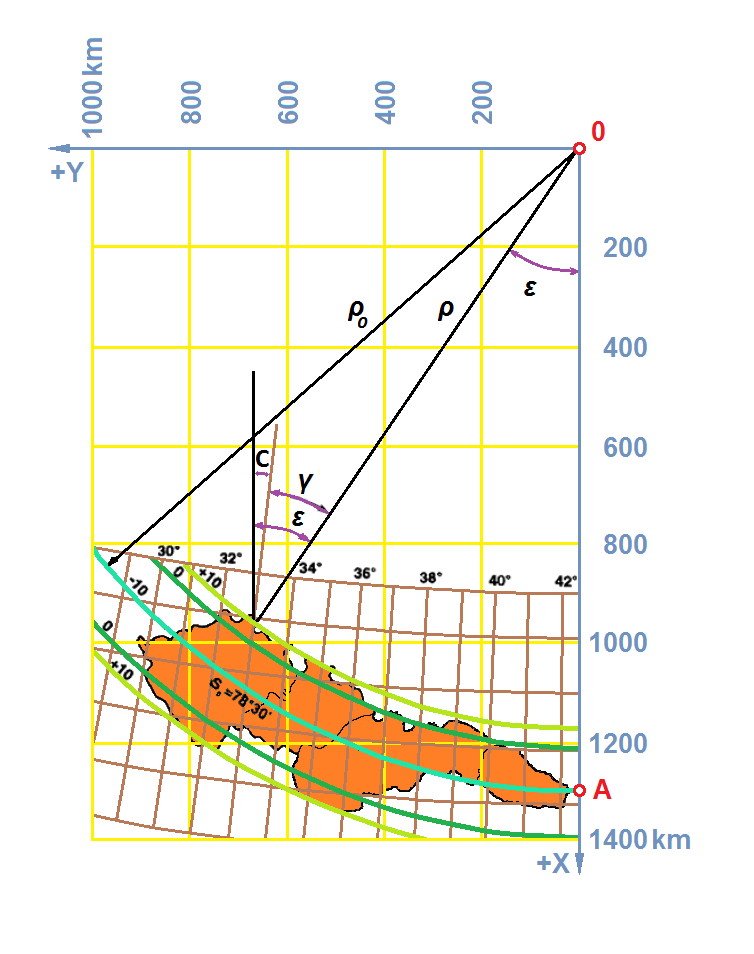
First Czechoslovak Republic projected in the Krovak grid

Křovák's projection or simply Krovak is a conic projection invented in 1922 by Czech geodesist Josef Křovák.

The projection is based on Bessel ellipsoid and it was calculated as the optimal projection of Czechoslovakia (in its interwar extent including Carpathian Ruthenia). It is still in use as national grids for civil state maps of the Czech Republic and Slovakia. The corresponding coordinate system is abbreviated S-JTSK (for Systém Jednotné trigonometrické sítě katastrální, "the Unified cadastral trigonometric network System"), code 5514.

The projection has been deliberately made so that for any point located in former Czechoslovakia, the X coordinate may be always bigger (in absolute value) than Y. This makes easy to distinguish the coordinates even when transformed into another quadrant.
