= Pečky =

- Town
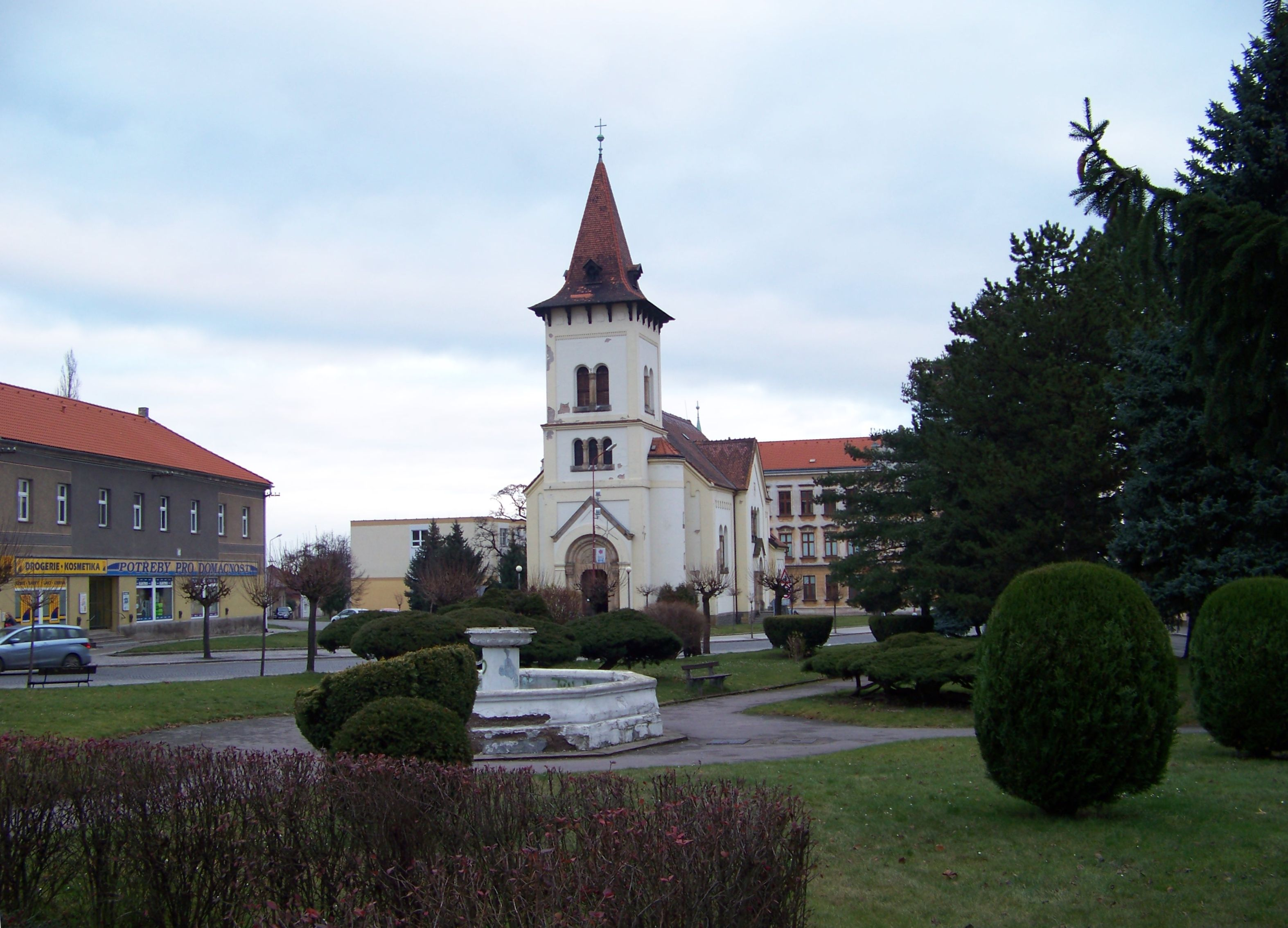
- Centre with Church of Saint Wenceslaus

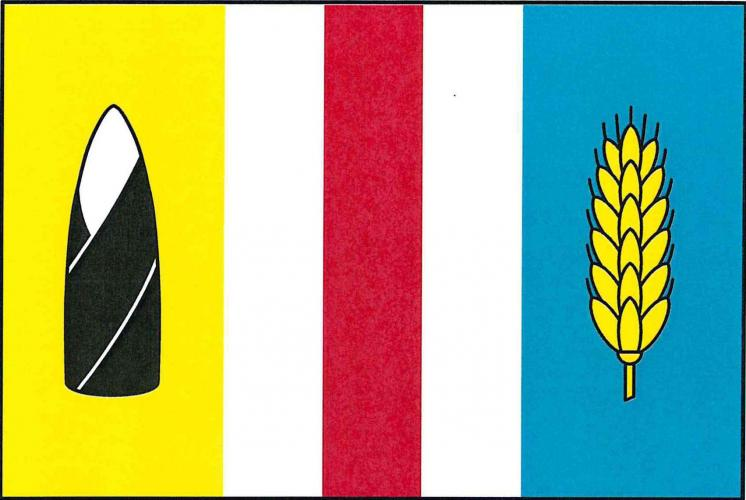
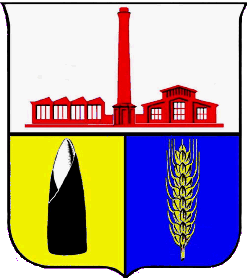
- Flag Coat of arms

- Location in the Czech Republic
- Coordinates: 50°5′26″N 15°1′49″E
- Country: Czech Republic
- Region: Central Bohemian
- District: Kolín
- First mentioned: 1225

Government
  - Mayor: Milan Paluska

Area
  - Total: 10.76 km^{2} (4.15 sq mi)
- Elevation: 194 m (636 ft)

Population (2026-01-01)
  - Total: 4,951
  - Density: 460.1/km^{2} (1,192/sq mi)
- Time zone: UTC+1 (CET)
  - Summer (DST): UTC+2 (CEST)
- Postal code: 289 11
- Website: www.pecky.cz

Pečky (Czech pronunciation: [ˈpɛtʃkɪ]) is a town in Kolín District in the Central Bohemian Region of the Czech Republic. It has about 5,000 inhabitants. The town is located on the Výrovka River in the Central Elbe Table.

Pečky was founded in the first quarter of the 13th century at the latest, but it became a town only in 1924. The main landmarks of the town are the Church of Master Jan Hus and the Church of Saint Wenceslaus.

== Administrative division ==
Pečky consists of two municipal parts (in brackets population according to the 2021 census):

- Pečky (4,195)
- Velké Chvalovice (539)

== Etymology ==
The name Pečky is derived from the word pečka, which once meant 'dried apple/pear' in Czech. The name may have originated from a nickname for the inhabitants or from the surname Pečka.

== Geography ==
Pečky is located about 13 kilometres (8 mi) northwest of Kolín and 35 km (22 mi) east of Prague. It lies in a flat agricultural landscape in the Central Elbe Table. The town is situated on the left bank of the Výrovka River.

== History ==
The first written mention of Pečky is in a donation deed of King Ottokar I from 1225. For centuries, it was a small agricultural community, often changing their owners and often divided between several estates.

After 1869, the railway was built and several larger companies were established, focused on the production of agricultural needs and processing of sugar beet. In 1879, Pečky became a market town, and in 1925, it became a town.

== Demographics ==
Historical population

Year	Pop.	±%
1869	1,929	—
1880	2,539	+31.6%
1890	3,388	+33.4%
1900	4,049	+19.5%
1910	4,644	+14.7%

Year	Pop.	±%
1921	4,535	−2.3%
1930	4,761	+5.0%
1950	3,805	−20.1%
1961	4,016	+5.5%
1970	4,188	+4.3%

Year	Pop.	±%
1980	4,409	+5.3%
1991	4,428	+0.4%
2001	4,255	−3.9%
2011	4,477	+5.2%
2021	4,734	+5.7%

Source: Censuses

== Transport ==
Pečky is located on the railway lines Prague–Kolín and Pečky–Plaňany.

== Sights ==
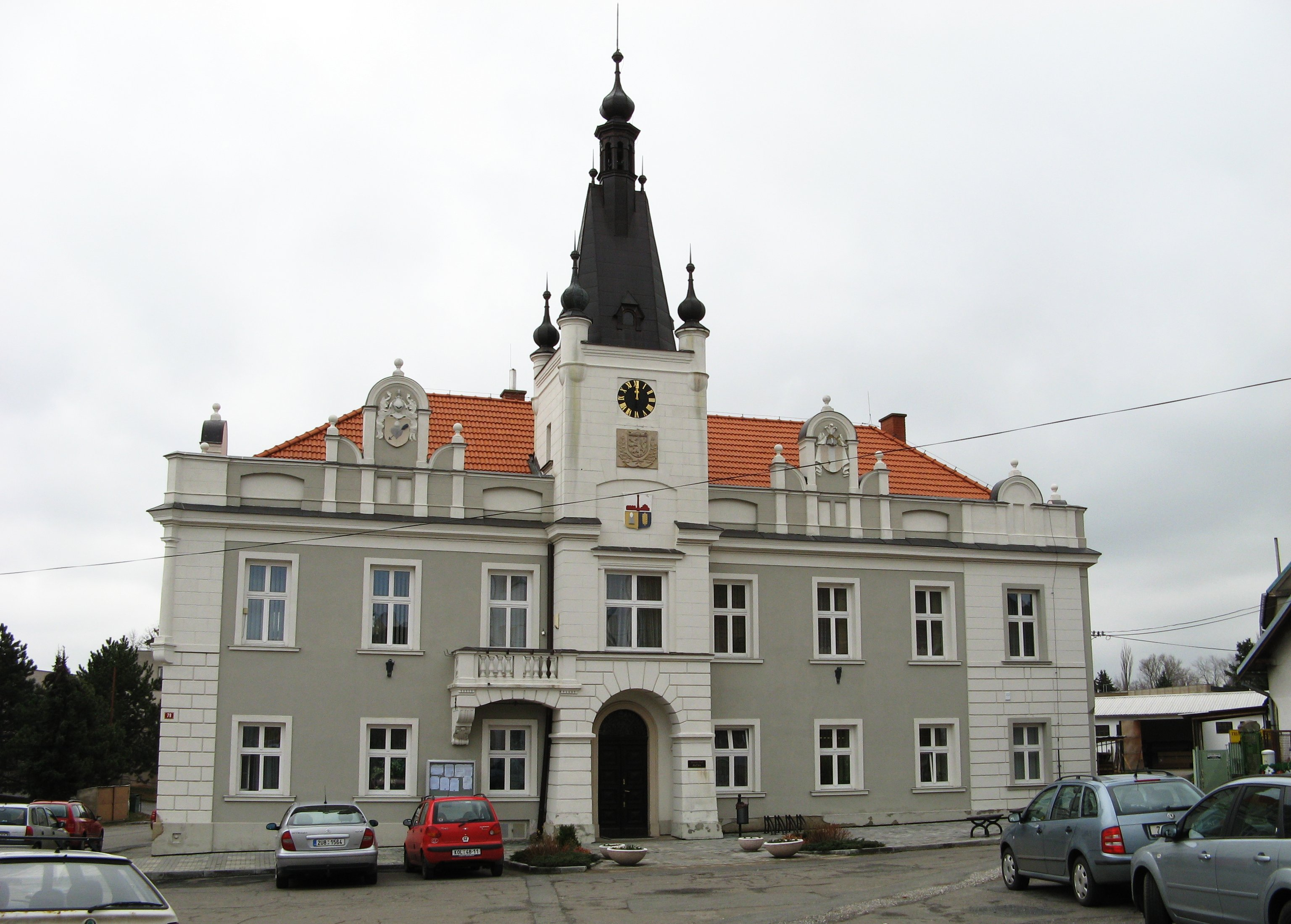
Town hall

The early Cubist building of the Evangelical Church of Master Jan Hus was completed in 1915 and is among the most important monuments in the town. The second important monument is the Church of Saint Wenceslaus. It is a neo-Romanesque Catholic church, consecrated in 1913. It has unique Art Nouveau decoration.

The town hall was built in the Art Nouveau style in 1901.

== Notable people ==
- Josef Křovák (1884–1951), geodesist, author of Křovák's projection
- Alois Vocásek (1896–2003), soldier, World War I veteran
- Tomáš Kuchař (born 1976), footballer
