= Třebovle =

- Municipality
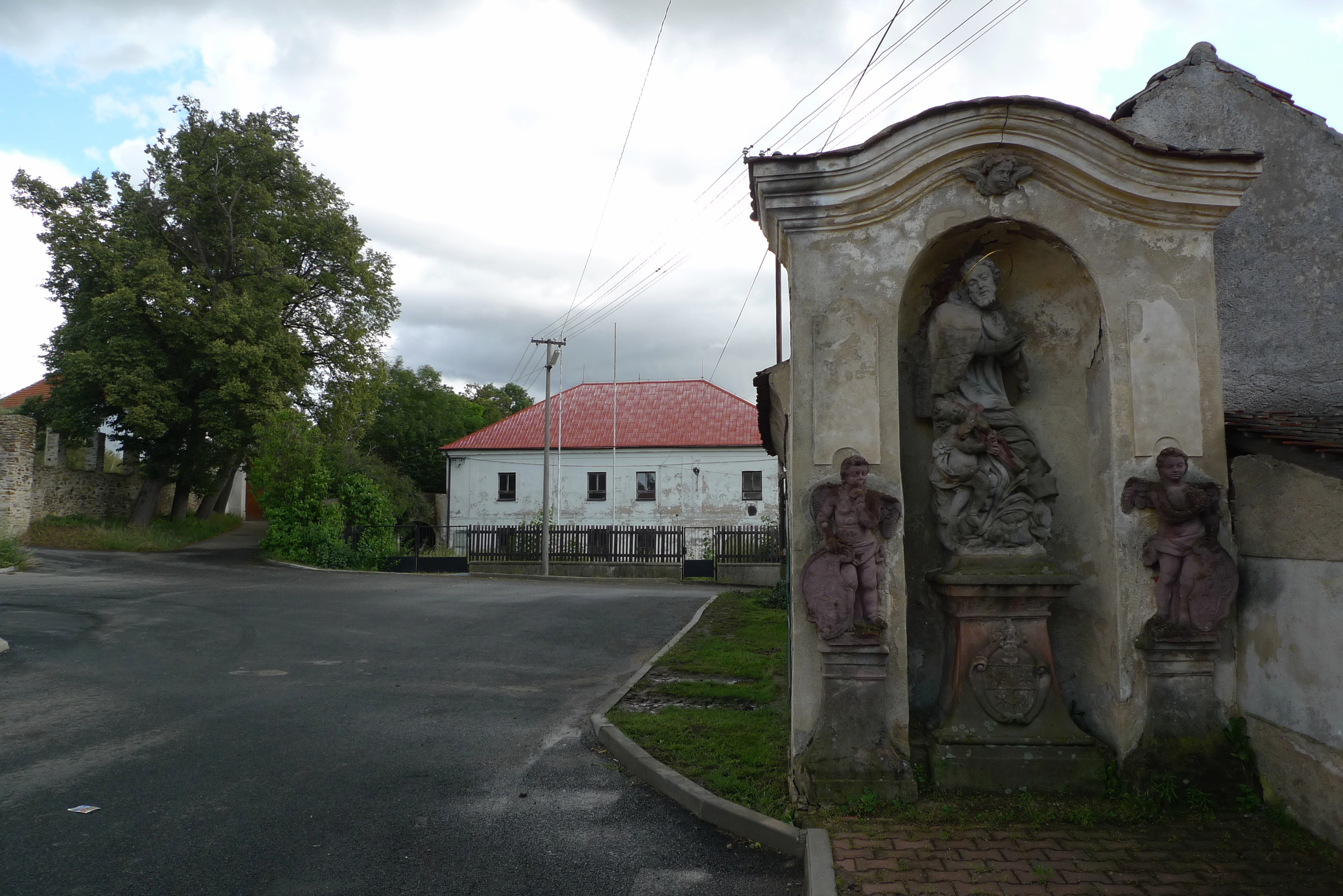
- Centre of Třebovle

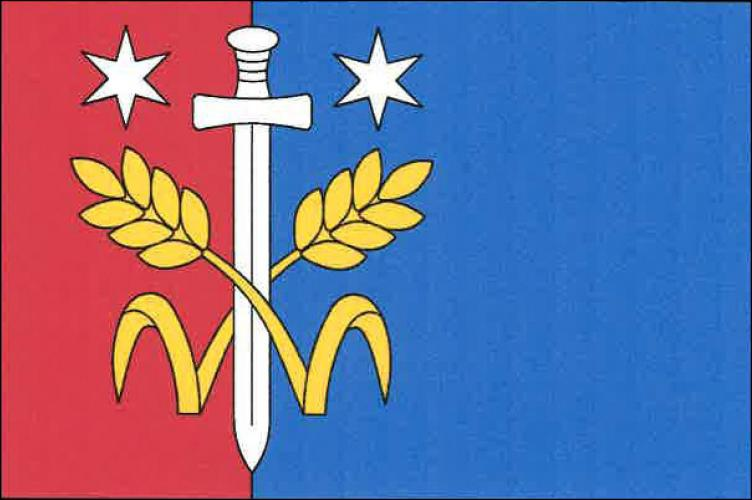
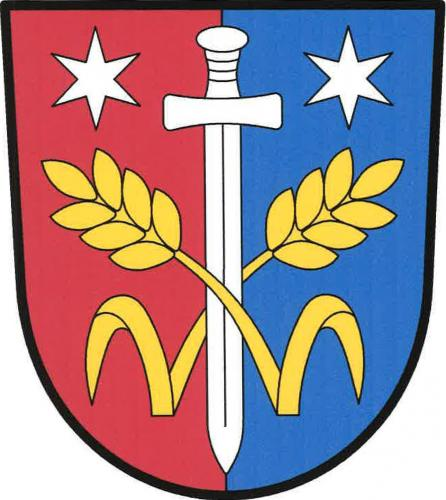
- Flag Coat of arms

- Location in the Czech Republic
- Coordinates: 50°1′38″N 14°57′43″E
- Country: Czech Republic
- Region: Central Bohemian
- District: Kolín
- First mentioned: 1297

Area
  - Total: 10.96 km^{2} (4.23 sq mi)
- Elevation: 252 m (827 ft)

Population (2026-01-01)
  - Total: 575
  - Density: 52.5/km^{2} (136/sq mi)
- Time zone: UTC+1 (CET)
  - Summer (DST): UTC+2 (CEST)
- Postal codes: 280 02, 281 63
- Website: www.trebovle-obec.cz

Třebovle is a municipality and village in Kolín District in the Central Bohemian Region of the Czech Republic. It has about 600 inhabitants.

== Administrative division ==
Třebovle consists of four municipal parts (in brackets population according to the 2021 census):

- Třebovle (396)
- Borek (63)
- Království (22)
- Miškovice (98)

== Demographics ==
Historical population
Year	Pop.	±%
1869	1,012	—
1880	1,005	−0.7%
1890	1,021	+1.6%
1900	981	−3.9%
1910	966	−1.5%
1921	976	+1.0%
1930	937	−4.0%
1950	743	−20.7%
1961	618	−16.8%
1970	542	−12.3%
1980	487	−10.1%
1991	428	−12.1%
2001	390	−8.9%
2011	477	+22.3%
2021	579	+21.4%
Source: Censuses
