= Písková Lhota (Nymburk District) =

- Municipality
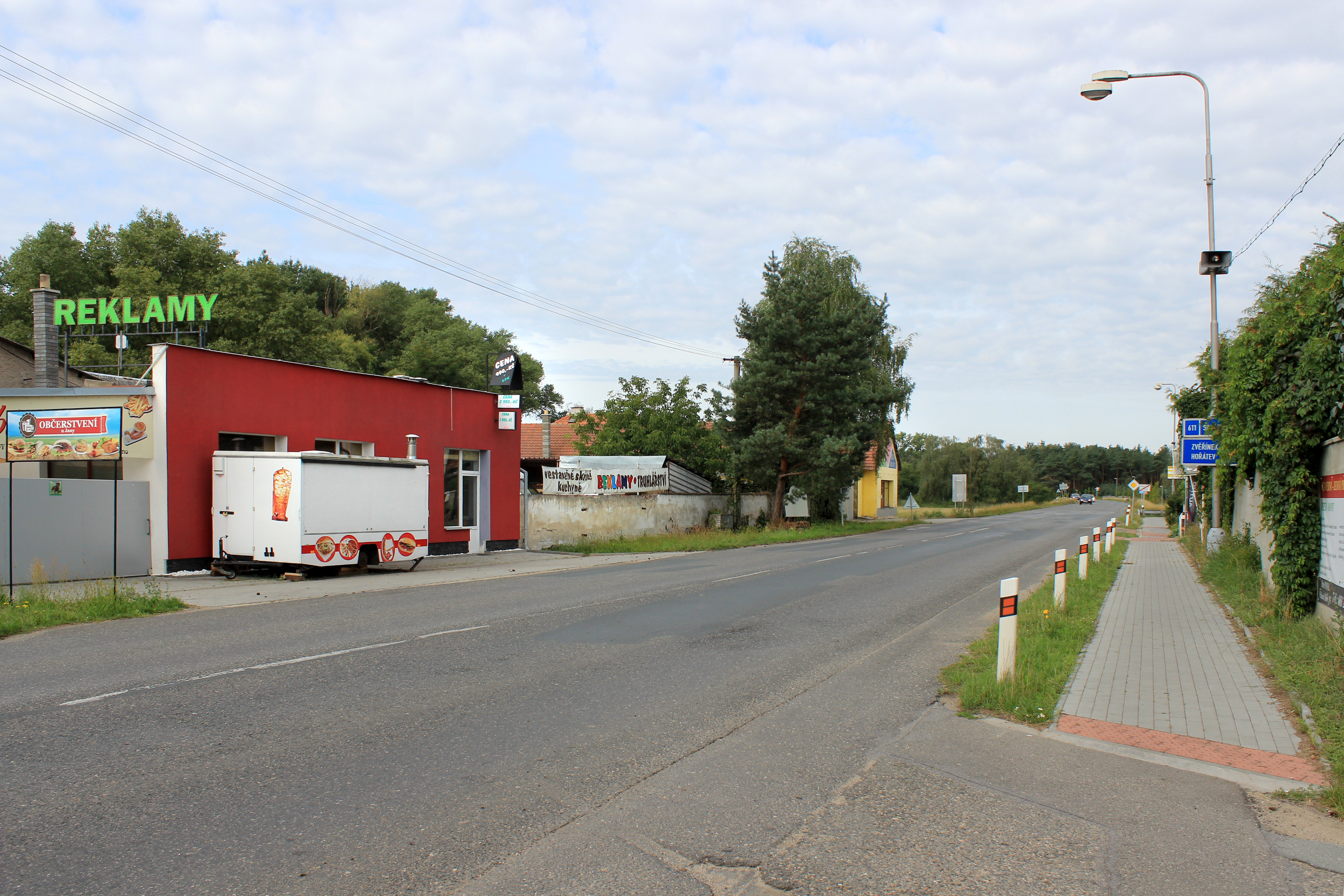
- Main road

- Location in the Czech Republic
- Coordinates: 50°7′53″N 15°3′57″E
- Country: Czech Republic
- Region: Central Bohemian
- District: Nymburk
- First mentioned: 1553

Area
  - Total: 6.43 km^{2} (2.48 sq mi)
- Elevation: 188 m (617 ft)

Population (2026-01-01)
  - Total: 578
  - Density: 89.9/km^{2} (233/sq mi)
- Time zone: UTC+1 (CET)
  - Summer (DST): UTC+2 (CEST)
- Postal code: 290 01
- Website: piskova-lhota.cz

Písková Lhota is a municipality and village in Nymburk District in the Central Bohemian Region of the Czech Republic. It has about 600 inhabitants.

== Etymology ==
The name means 'sandy Lhota' in Czech.

== Geography ==
Písková Lhota is located about 6 kilometres (4 mi) south of Nymburk and 36 km (22 mi) east of Prague. It lies in a flat agricultural landscape in the Central Elbe Table. The Výrovka River flows along the western municipal border.

In the southeastern part of the municipality is an artificial lake called Pískovna. It was created by flooding a sandstone and gravel quarry. Today it is used for recreational purposes.

== History ==
The first written mention of Písková Lhota is from 1553.

== Demographics ==
Historical population

Year	Pop.	±%
1869	670	—
1880	673	+0.4%
1890	701	+4.2%
1900	660	−5.8%
1910	619	−6.2%

Year	Pop.	±%
1921	620	+0.2%
1930	624	+0.6%
1950	531	−14.9%
1961	493	−7.2%
1970	457	−7.3%

Year	Pop.	±%
1980	461	+0.9%
1991	406	−11.9%
2001	404	−0.5%
2011	423	+4.7%
2021	528	+24.8%

Source: Censuses

== Transport ==
The D11 motorway (part of the European route E67) from Prague to Hradec Králové runs through the municipality.

== Sights ==
There are no protected cultural monuments in the municipality.
