= Odřepsy =

- Municipality
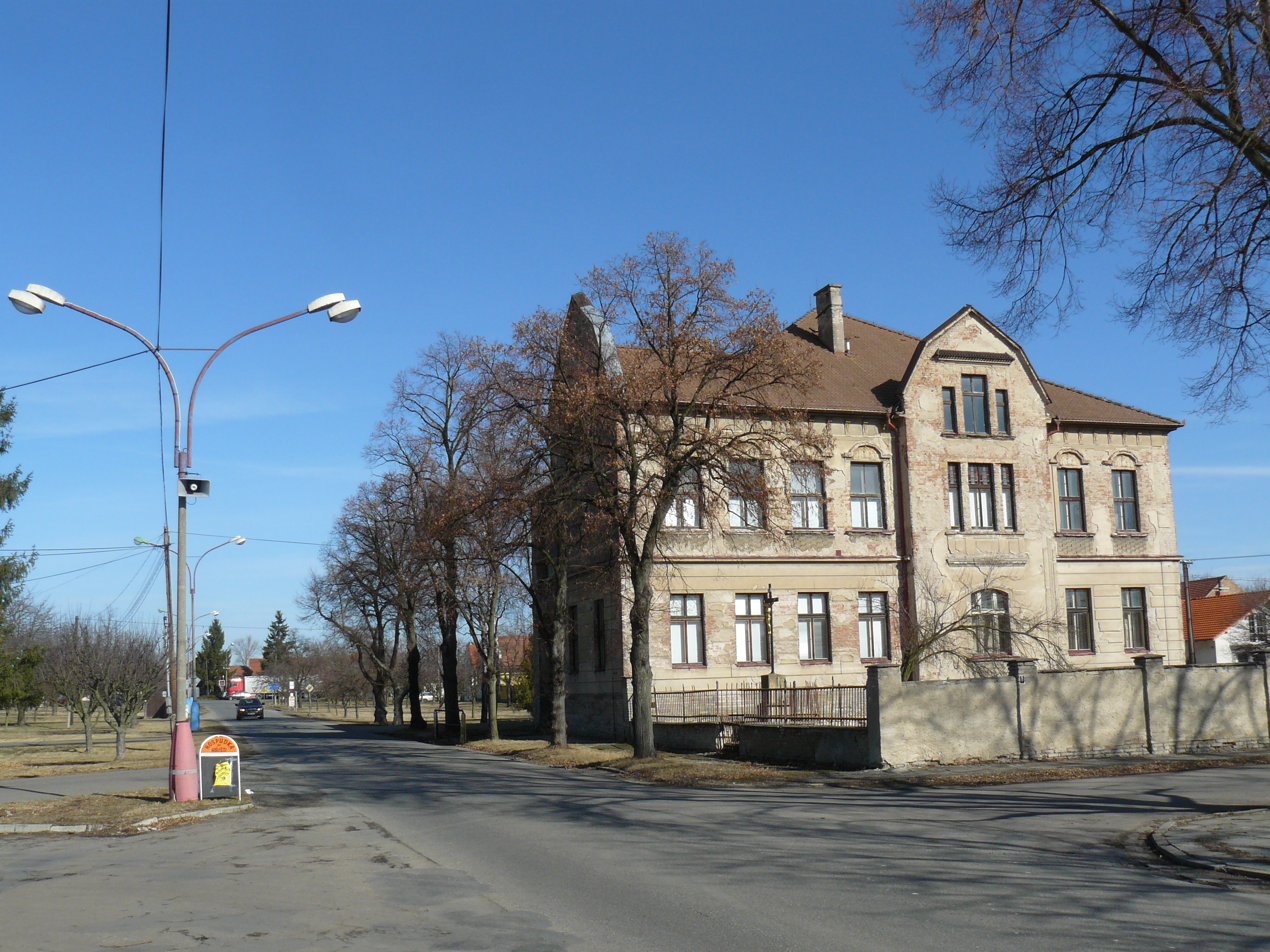
- Centre of Odřepsy

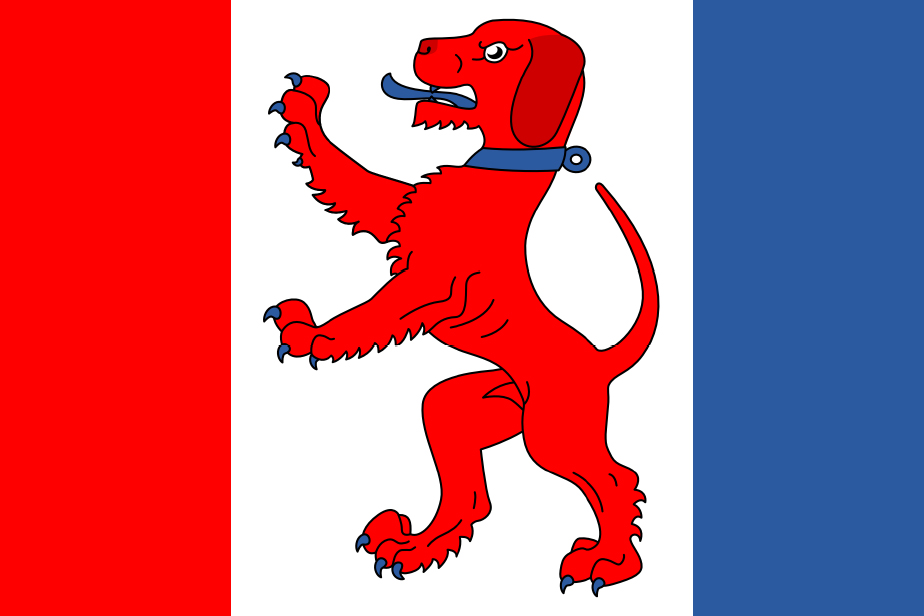
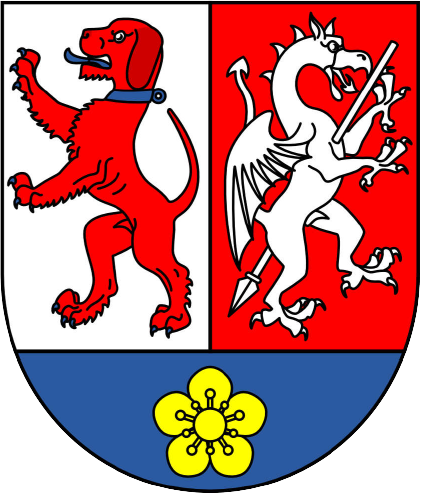
- Flag Coat of arms

- Location in the Czech Republic
- Coordinates: 50°8′39″N 15°11′20″E
- Country: Czech Republic
- Region: Central Bohemian
- District: Nymburk
- First mentioned: 1227

Area
  - Total: 6.09 km^{2} (2.35 sq mi)
- Elevation: 192 m (630 ft)

Population (2026-01-01)
  - Total: 307
  - Density: 50.4/km^{2} (131/sq mi)
- Time zone: UTC+1 (CET)
  - Summer (DST): UTC+2 (CEST)
- Postal code: 289 07
- Website: www.odrepsy.cz

Odřepsy is a municipality and village in Nymburk District in the Central Bohemian Region of the Czech Republic. It has about 300 inhabitants.

== Demographics ==
Historical population
| Year | Pop. | ±% |
|---|---|---|
| 1869 | 509 | — |
| 1880 | 566 | +11.2% |
| 1890 | 579 | +2.3% |
| 1900 | 571 | −1.4% |
| 1910 | 571 | +0.0% |
| 1921 | 573 | +0.4% |
| 1930 | 518 | −9.6% |
| 1950 | 404 | −22.0% |
| 1961 | 363 | −10.1% |
| 1970 | 367 | +1.1% |
| 1980 | 331 | −9.8% |
| 1991 | 283 | −14.5% |
| 2001 | 291 | +2.8% |
| 2011 | 327 | +12.4% |
| 2021 | 341 | +4.3% |
Source: Censuses
