= Hořátev =

- Municipality
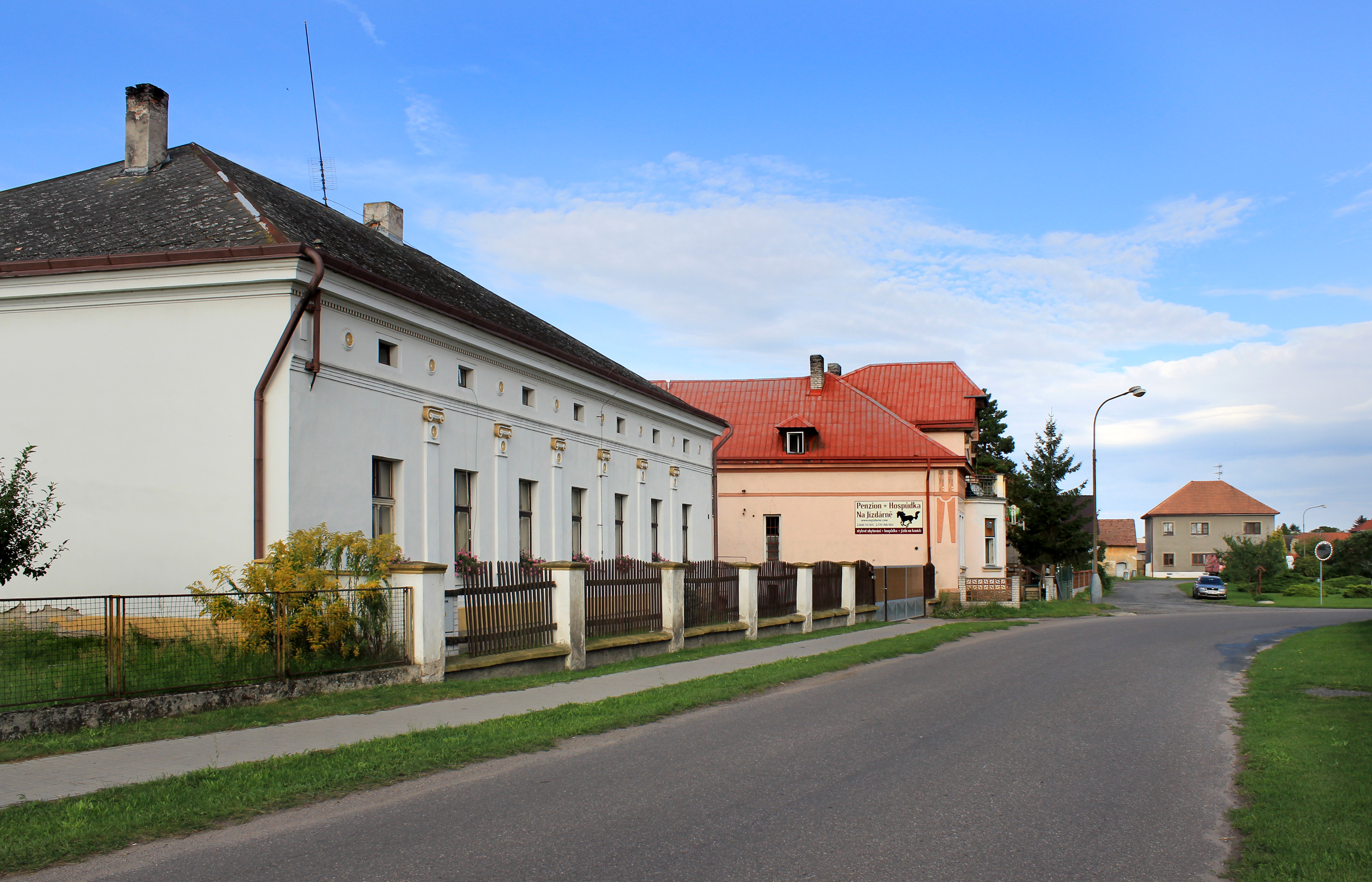
- Eastern part of Hořátev

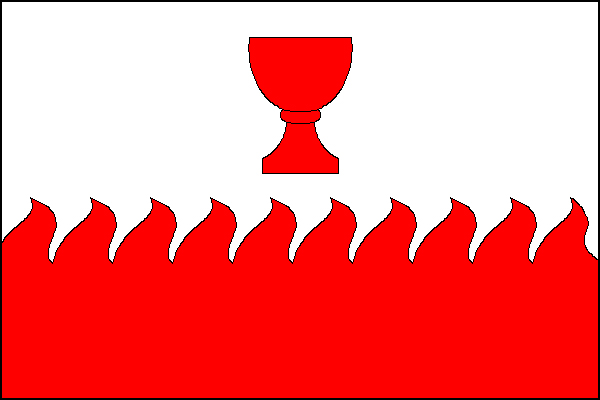
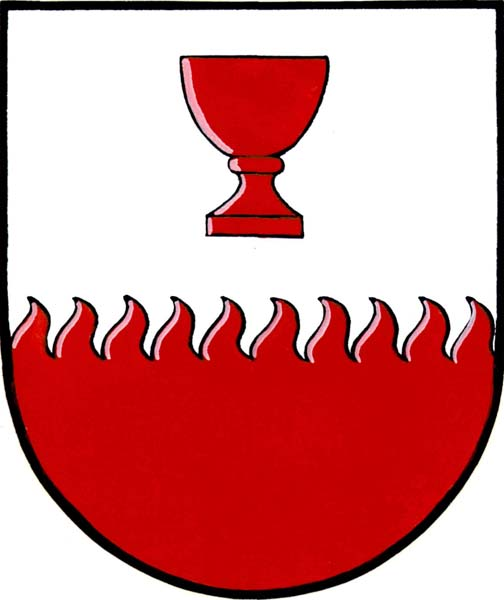
- Flag Coat of arms

- Location in the Czech Republic
- Coordinates: 50°8′59″N 15°2′24″E
- Country: Czech Republic
- Region: Central Bohemian
- District: Nymburk
- First mentioned: 1384

Area
  - Total: 7.15 km^{2} (2.76 sq mi)
- Elevation: 186 m (610 ft)

Population (2026-01-01)
  - Total: 796
  - Density: 111/km^{2} (288/sq mi)
- Time zone: UTC+1 (CET)
  - Summer (DST): UTC+2 (CEST)
- Postal code: 289 13
- Website: www.horatev.cz

Hořátev is a municipality and village in Nymburk District in the Central Bohemian Region of the Czech Republic. It has about 800 inhabitants.

== History ==
The first written mention of Hořátev is from 1384.

== Demographics ==
Historical population
Year	Pop.	±%
1869	448	—
1880	489	+9.2%
1890	545	+11.5%
1900	514	−5.7%
1910	554	+7.8%
1921	682	+23.1%
1930	721	+5.7%
1950	659	−8.6%
1961	679	+3.0%
1970	642	−5.4%
1980	615	−4.2%
1991	527	−14.3%
2001	611	+15.9%
2011	747	+22.3%
2021	795	+6.4%
Source: Censuses
