= Nymburk District =

Nymburk District Okres Nymburk
- District
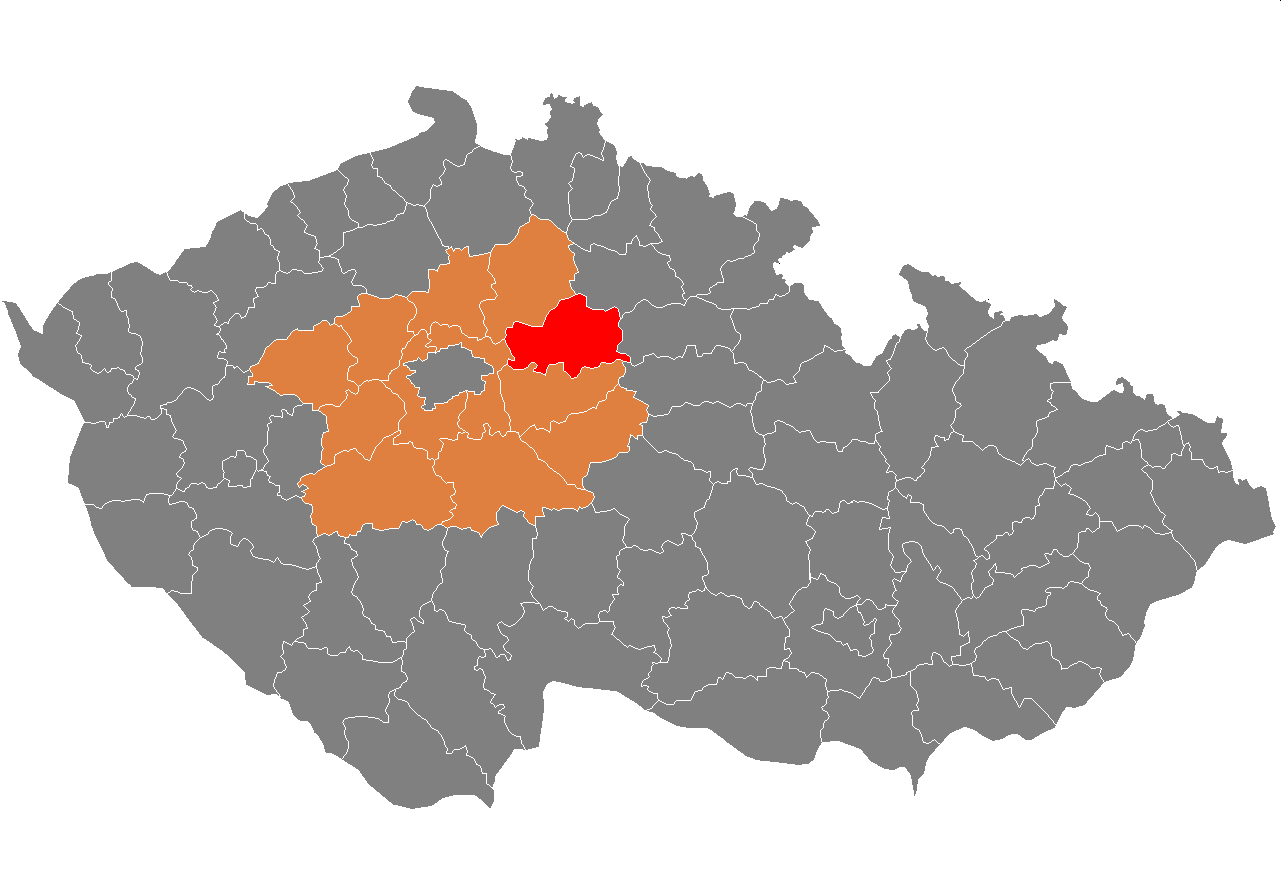
- Location in the Central Bohemian Region within the Czech Republic
- Coordinates: 50°13′N 15°6′E
- Country: Czech Republic
- Region: Central Bohemian
- Capital: Nymburk

Area
  - Total: 846.40 km^{2} (326.80 sq mi)

Population (2026)
  - Total: 108,742
  - Density: 128.48/km^{2} (332.75/sq mi)
- Time zone: UTC+1 (CET)
  - Summer (DST): UTC+2 (CEST)
- Municipalities: 86
- * Towns: 7
- * Market towns: 3

Nymburk District (Czech: okres Nymburk) is a district in the Central Bohemian Region of the Czech Republic. Its capital is the town of Nymburk.

== Administrative division ==
Nymburk District is divided into three administrative districts of municipalities with extended competence: Nymburk, Lysá nad Labem and Poděbrady.

=== List of municipalities ===
Towns are marked in bold and market towns in italics:

Běrunice - Bobnice - Bříství - Budiměřice - Chleby - Choťánky - Chotěšice - Chrást - Chroustov - Čilec - Činěves - Dlouhopolsko - Dobšice - Dvory - Dymokury - Hořany - Hořátev - Hradčany - Hradištko - Hrubý Jeseník - Jíkev - Jiřice - Jizbice - Kamenné Zboží - Kněžice - Kněžičky - Kolaje - Kostelní Lhota - Kostomlátky - Kostomlaty nad Labem - Košík - Kounice - Kouty - Kovanice - Krchleby - Křečkov - Křinec - Libice nad Cidlinou - Loučeň - Lysá nad Labem - Mcely - Městec Králové - Milčice - Milovice - Netřebice - Nový Dvůr - Nymburk - Odřepsy - Okřínek - Opočnice - Opolany - Oseček - Oskořínek - Ostrá - Pátek - Písková Lhota - Písty - Poděbrady - Podmoky - Přerov nad Labem - Rožďalovice - Sadská - Sány - Seletice - Semice - Senice - Sloveč - Sokoleč - Stará Lysá - Starý Vestec - Straky - Stratov - Třebestovice - Úmyslovice - Velenice - Velenka - Vestec - Vlkov pod Oškobrhem - Vrbice - Vrbová Lhota - Všechlapy - Vykáň - Záhornice - Zbožíčko - Žitovlice - Zvěřínek

== Geography ==
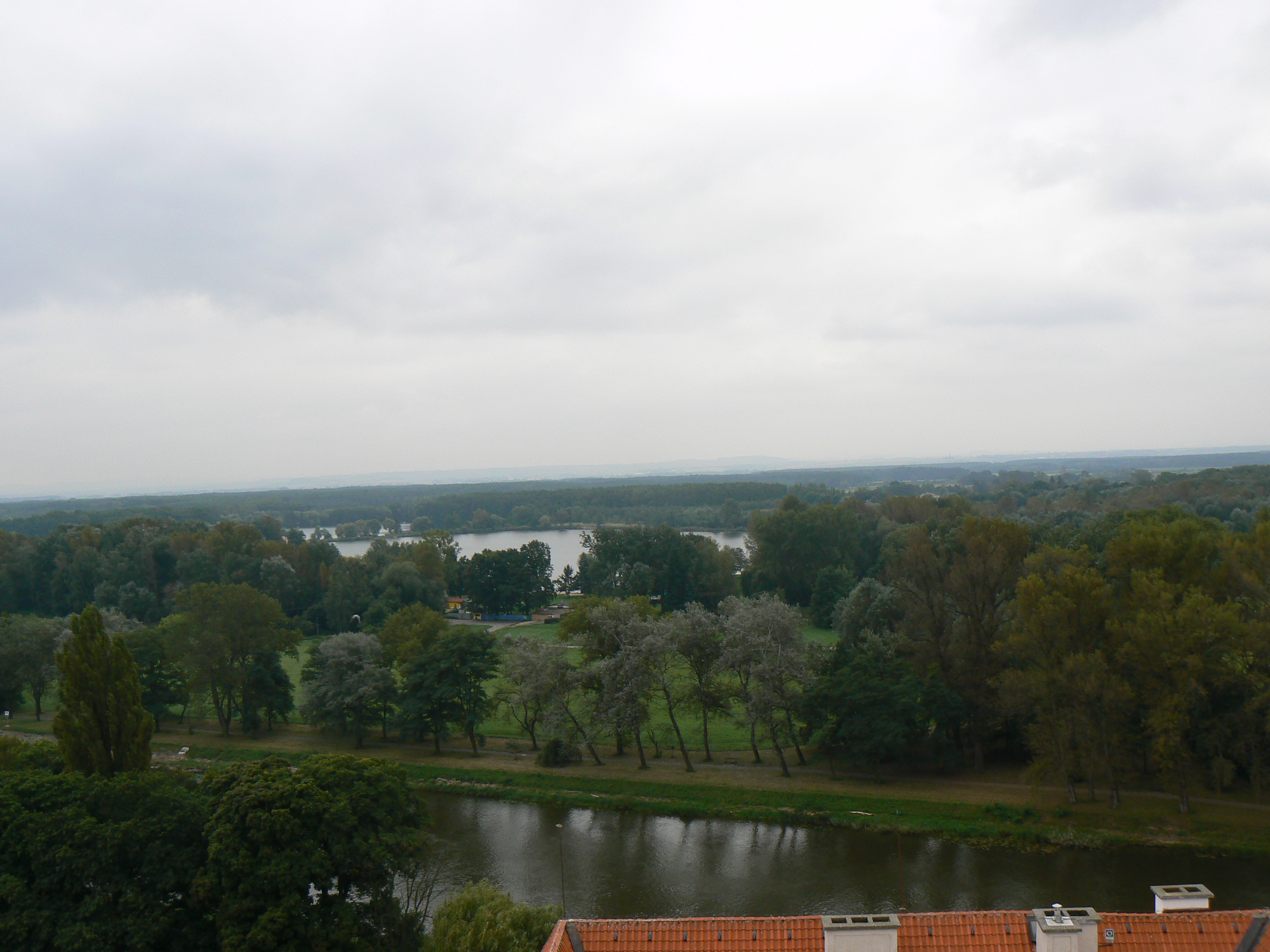
Elbe and Poděbrady Lake in Poděbrady

The surface of the district has a distinctly flat character, a significant part of the district lies in the Polabí lowland. The territory extends into three geomorphological mesoregions: Central Elbe Table (most of the territory), Jizera Table (small parts in the west and north) and East Elbe Table (very small part in the east). The highest point of the district is the hill Na kostele in Kněžice with an elevation of 299 m (981 ft), which is the lowest among all districts in the country. The lowest point is the river bed of the Elbe in Přerov nad Labem at 173 m (568 ft).

From the total district area of 846.4 km^{2} (326.8 sq mi), agricultural land occupies 584.8 km^{2} (225.8 sq mi), forests occupy 148.5 km^{2} (57.3 sq mi), and water area occupies 18.5 km^{2} (7.1 sq mi). Forests cover 17.5% of the district's area.

The most important river is the Elbe, flowing from the south to the west. The north of the district is drained by the Mrlina (a tributary of the Elbe). Several kilometres of the Cidlina also flow through the territory before its confluence with the Elbe. There are some middle-sized ponds, but none larger than 25 ha (62 acres). There are also several artificial lakes in the vicinity of the Elbe, created by flooding sand quarries.

There are no large-scale protected areas.

== Demographics ==
Historical population

Year	Pop.	±%
1869	72,795	—
1880	84,046	+15.5%
1890	87,401	+4.0%
1900	88,310	+1.0%
1910	93,602	+6.0%

Year	Pop.	±%
1921	96,960	+3.6%
1930	101,607	+4.8%
1950	94,472	−7.0%
1961	94,222	−0.3%
1970	89,994	−4.5%

Year	Pop.	±%
1980	86,102	−4.3%
1991	81,122	−5.8%
2001	82,708	+2.0%
2011	94,768	+14.6%
2021	102,727	+8.4%

Source: Censuses (Note: Excluding Černíky, which was part of Nymburk District until 2020.)

=== Most populous municipalities ===
Name	Population	Area (km^{2})
Nymburk	15,795	21
Poděbrady	15,238	34
Milovice	14,609	28
Lysá nad Labem	10,072	34
Sadská	3,308	16
Městec Králové	2,867	20
Kostomlaty nad Labem	1,939	18
Kounice	1,755	11
Rožďalovice	1,716	24
Semice	1,445	9

== Economy ==
The largest employers with headquarters in Nymburk District and at least 500 employees are:

Economic entity	Location	Number of employees	Main activity
Super Pet	Poděbrady	1,500–1,999	Retail sale
Louda Auto	Choťánky	500–999	Trade and maintenance of motor vehicles
Fresenius Kabi Horatev CZ	Hořátev	500–999	Manufacture of medical supplies
Nymburk Hospital	Nymburk	500–999	Health care
Crystal Bohemia	Poděbrady	500–999	Manufacture of glass and glass products
Poděbrady Spa	Poděbrady	500–999	Health care

== Transport ==
The D11 motorway from Prague to Hradec Králové passes through the southern part of the district.

== Sights ==
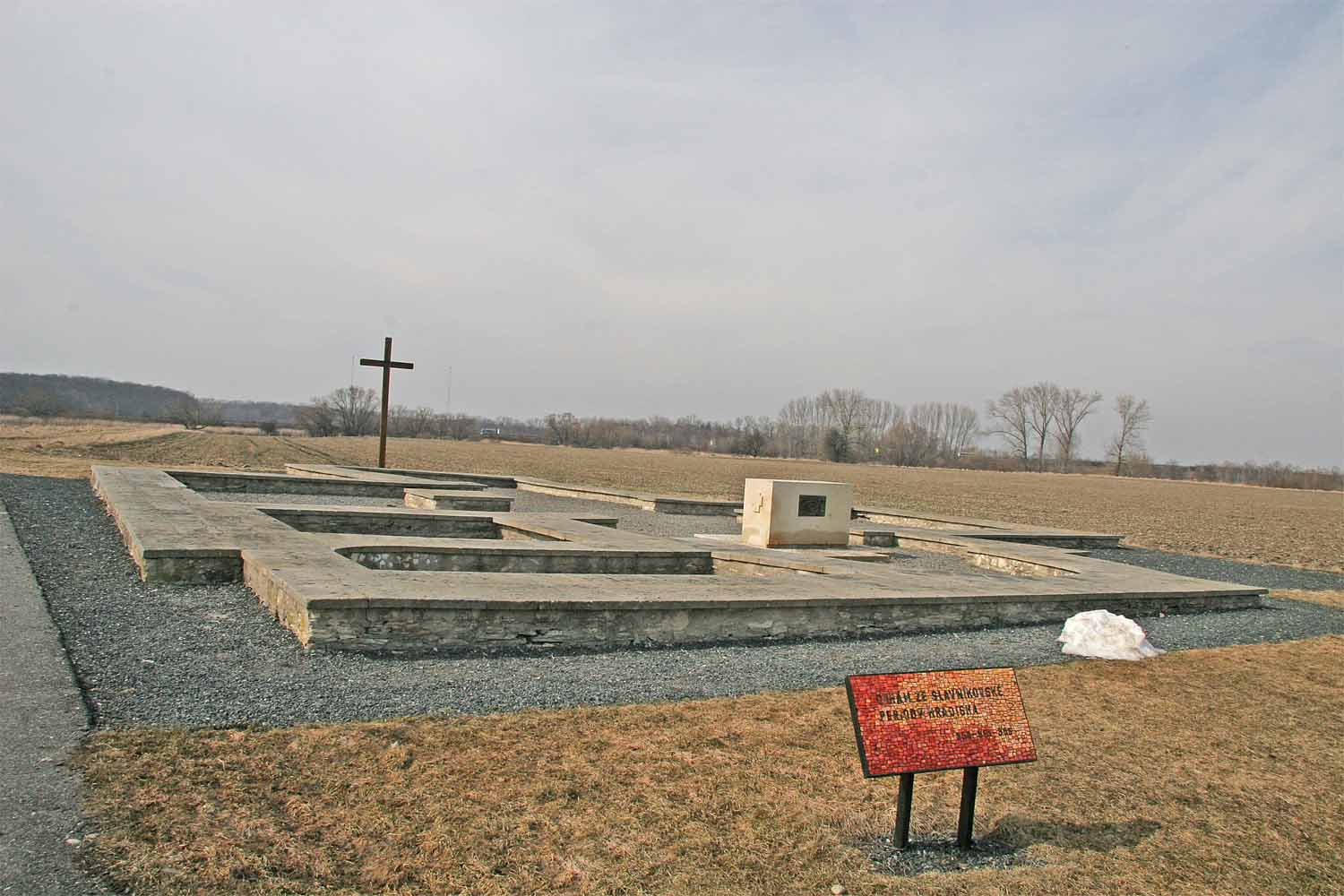
Slavník gord in Libice nad Cidlinou

The most important monuments in the district, protected as national cultural monuments, are:

- Slavník gord in Libice nad Cidlinou
- Crematorium in Nymburk
- Hydroelectric power plant in Poděbrady
- Monument of King George of Poděbrady in Poděbrady

The best-preserved settlements and archaeological sites, protected as monument reservations and monument zones, are:

- Bošín (monument reservation)
- Area of the Slavník gord in Libice nad Cidlinou (monument reservation)
- Lysá nad Labem
- Nymburk
- Poděbrady
- Pojedy
- Sovenice
- Vinice

The most visited tourist destinations are the Mirakulum amusement park in Milovice, Loučeň Castle, and Chleby Zoo.
