= Vrbice (Nymburk District) =

- Municipality
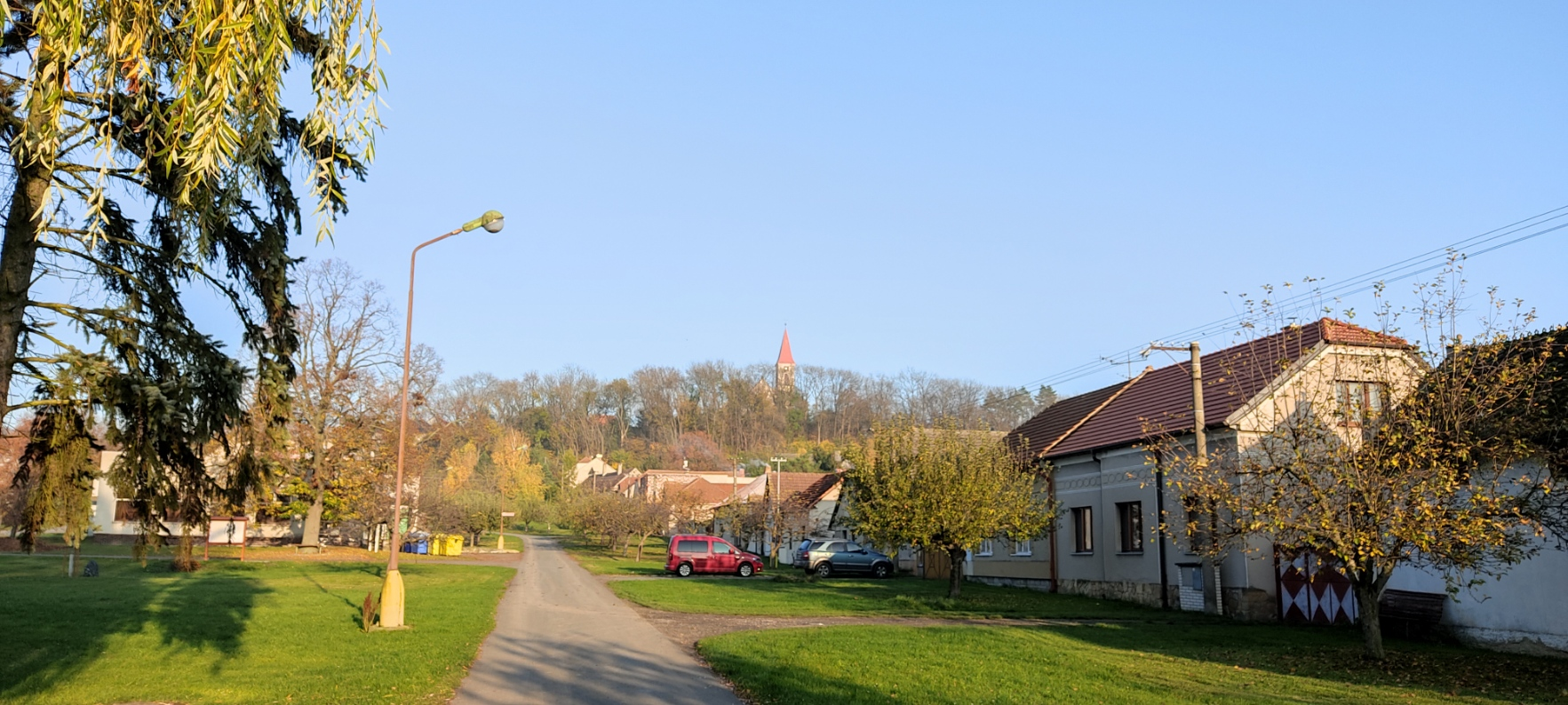
- Centre of Vrbice

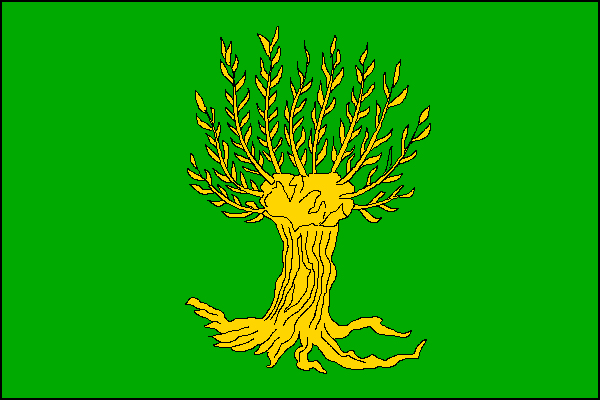
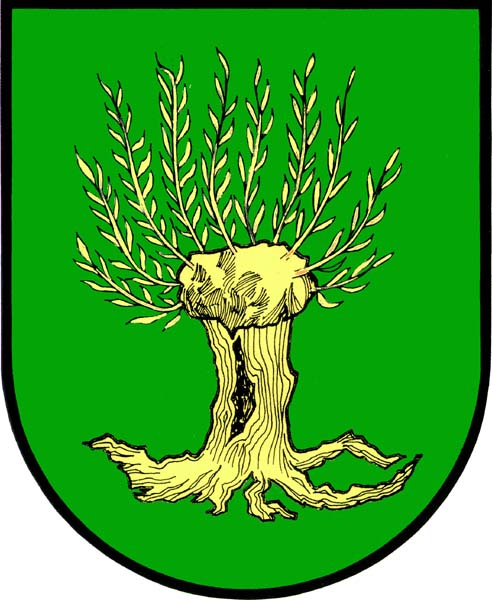
- Flag Coat of arms

- Location in the Czech Republic
- Coordinates: 50°10′51″N 15°13′50″E
- Country: Czech Republic
- Region: Central Bohemian
- District: Nymburk
- First mentioned: 1305

Area
  - Total: 5.85 km^{2} (2.26 sq mi)
- Elevation: 207 m (679 ft)

Population (2026-01-01)
  - Total: 188
  - Density: 32.1/km^{2} (83.2/sq mi)
- Time zone: UTC+1 (CET)
  - Summer (DST): UTC+2 (CEST)
- Postal code: 289 04
- Website: www.vrbiceupodebrad.cz

Vrbice is a municipality and village in Nymburk District in the Central Bohemian Region of the Czech Republic. It has about 200 inhabitants.

== Demographics ==
Historical population
Year	Pop.	±%
1869	300	—
1880	580	+93.3%
1890	597	+2.9%
1900	592	−0.8%
1910	573	−3.2%
1921	497	−13.3%
1930	464	−6.6%
1950	337	−27.4%
1961	314	−6.8%
1970	293	−6.7%
1980	235	−19.8%
1991	200	−14.9%
2001	184	−8.0%
2011	171	−7.1%
2021	176	+2.9%
Source: Censuses
