= Okřínek =

- Municipality
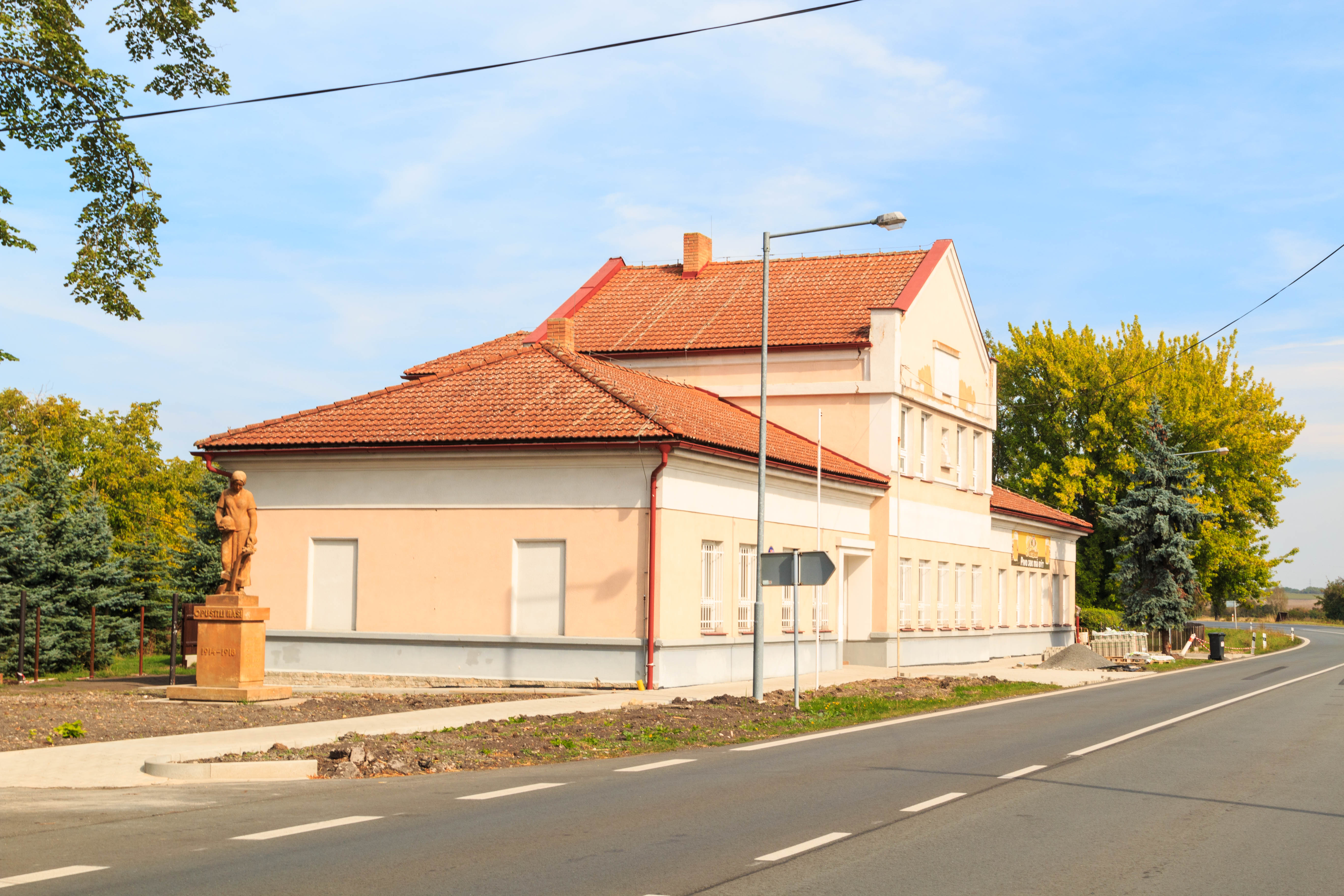
- Municipal office

- Location in the Czech Republic
- Coordinates: 50°9′52″N 15°11′33″E
- Country: Czech Republic
- Region: Central Bohemian
- District: Nymburk
- First mentioned: 1790

Area
  - Total: 5.59 km^{2} (2.16 sq mi)
- Elevation: 189 m (620 ft)

Population (2026-01-01)
  - Total: 207
  - Density: 37.0/km^{2} (95.9/sq mi)
- Time zone: UTC+1 (CET)
  - Summer (DST): UTC+2 (CEST)
- Postal codes: 289 04, 290 01
- Website: www.okrinek.eu

Okřínek is a municipality and village in Nymburk District in the Central Bohemian Region of the Czech Republic. It has about 200 inhabitants.

== Administrative division ==
Okřínek consists of two municipal parts (in brackets population according to the 2021 census):

- Okřínek (152)
- Srbce (39)

== Demographics ==
Historical population
Year	Pop.	±%
1869	394	—
1880	461	+17.0%
1890	512	+11.1%
1900	490	−4.3%
1910	448	−8.6%
1921	468	+4.5%
1930	475	+1.5%
1950	340	−28.4%
1961	309	−9.1%
1970	303	−1.9%
1980	238	−21.5%
1991	176	−26.1%
2001	146	−17.0%
2011	152	+4.1%
2021	191	+25.7%
Source: Censuses
