= Dlouhopolsko =

- Municipality
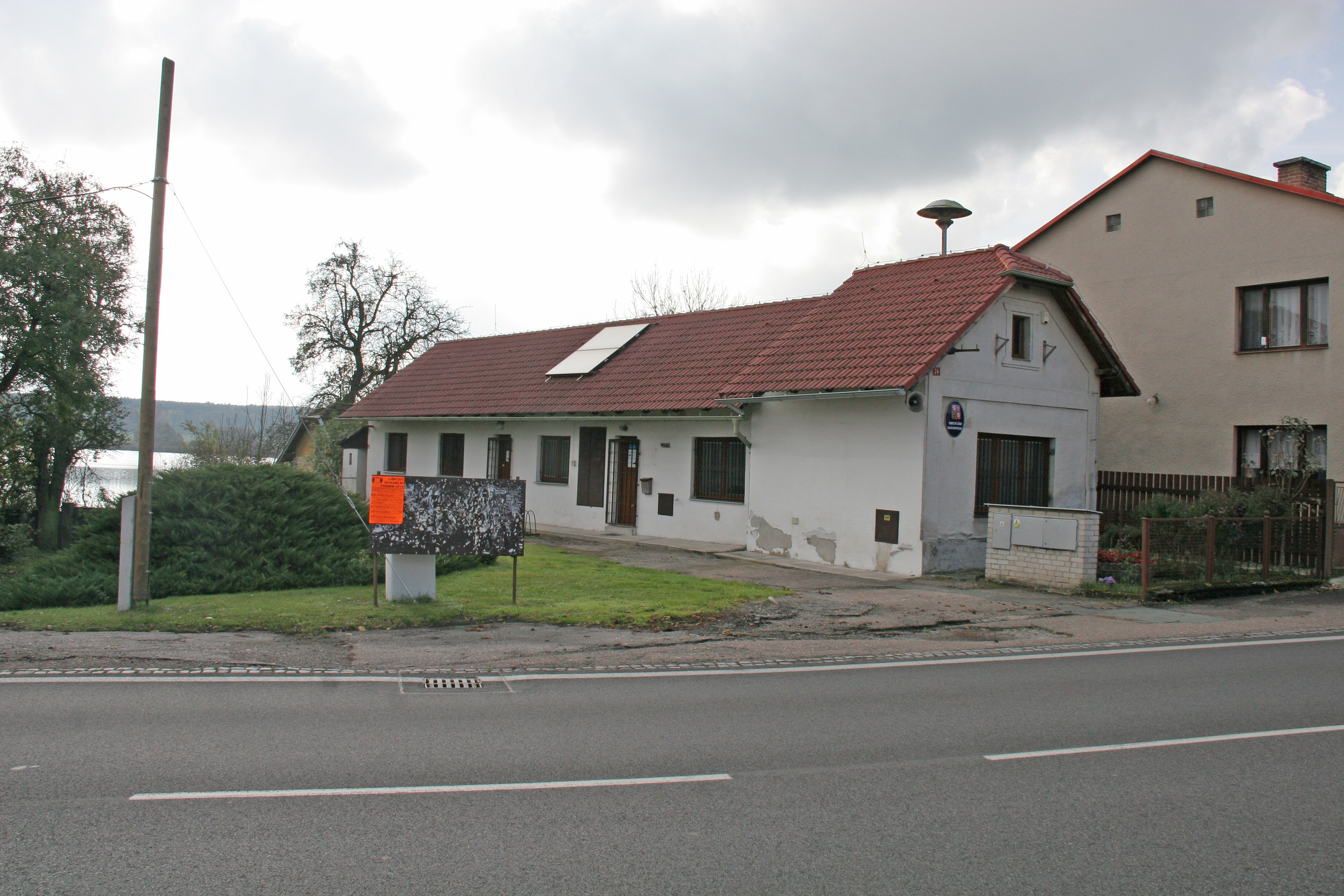
- Municipal office

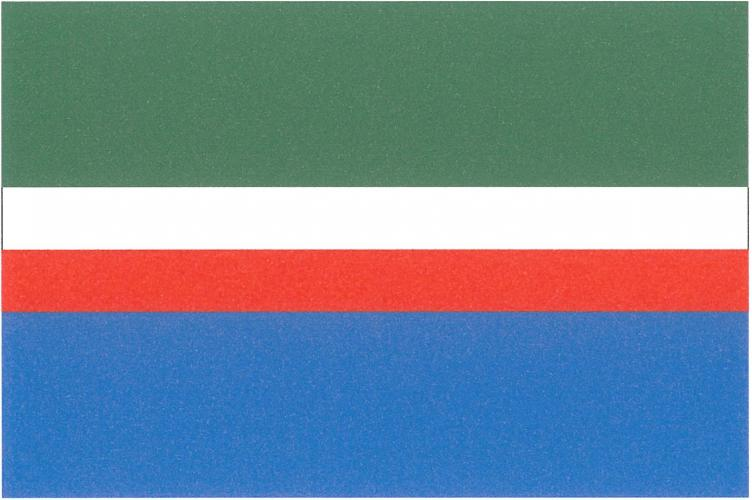
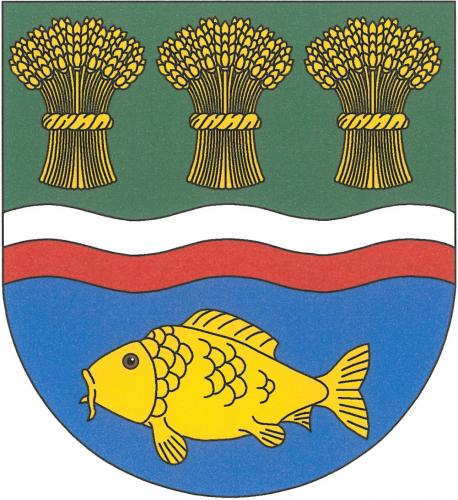
- Flag Coat of arms

- Location in the Czech Republic
- Coordinates: 50°10′31″N 15°18′22″E
- Country: Czech Republic
- Region: Central Bohemian
- District: Nymburk
- First mentioned: 1389

Area
  - Total: 2.18 km^{2} (0.84 sq mi)
- Elevation: 232 m (761 ft)

Population (2026-01-01)
  - Total: 238
  - Density: 109/km^{2} (283/sq mi)
- Time zone: UTC+1 (CET)
  - Summer (DST): UTC+2 (CEST)
- Postal code: 289 03
- Website: www.dlouhopolsko.cz

Dlouhopolsko is a municipality and village in Nymburk District in the Central Bohemian Region of the Czech Republic. It has about 200 inhabitants.

== Demographics ==
Historical population
Year	Pop.	±%
1869	301	—
1880	402	+33.6%
1890	443	+10.2%
1900	481	+8.6%
1910	569	+18.3%
1921	535	−6.0%
1930	501	−6.4%
1950	405	−19.2%
1961	421	+4.0%
1970	399	−5.2%
1980	343	−14.0%
1991	253	−26.2%
2001	229	−9.5%
2011	200	−12.7%
2021	216	+8.0%
Source: Censuses
