= Choťánky =

- Municipality
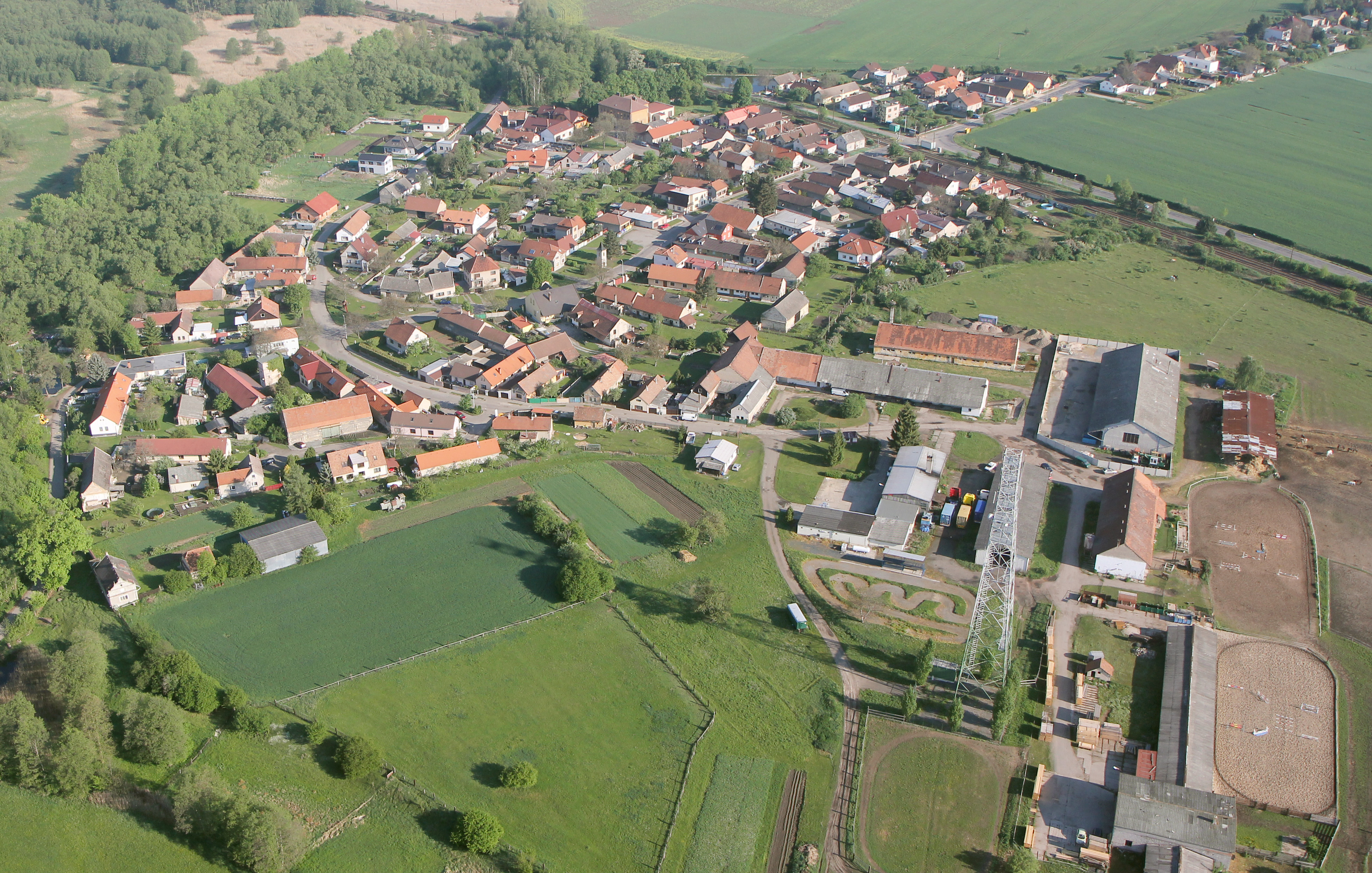
- Aerial view

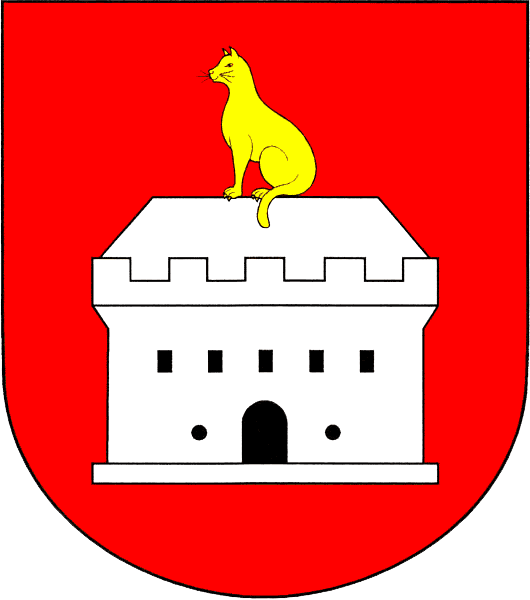
- Flag Coat of arms

- Location in the Czech Republic
- Coordinates: 50°8′18″N 15°9′45″E
- Country: Czech Republic
- Region: Central Bohemian
- District: Nymburk
- First mentioned: 1345

Area
  - Total: 4.03 km^{2} (1.56 sq mi)
- Elevation: 189 m (620 ft)

Population (2026-01-01)
  - Total: 534
  - Density: 133/km^{2} (343/sq mi)
- Time zone: UTC+1 (CET)
  - Summer (DST): UTC+2 (CEST)
- Postal code: 290 01
- Website: www.chotanky.cz

Choťánky is a municipality and village in Nymburk District in the Central Bohemian Region of the Czech Republic. It has about 500 inhabitants.

== Demographics ==
Historical population
Year	Pop.	±%
1869	376	—
1880	402	+6.9%
1890	385	−4.2%
1900	419	+8.8%
1910	484	+15.5%
1921	495	+2.3%
1930	480	−3.0%
1950	434	−9.6%
1961	432	−0.5%
1970	441	+2.1%
1980	448	+1.6%
1991	392	−12.5%
2001	406	+3.6%
2011	413	+1.7%
2021	432	+4.6%
Source: Censuses
