= Hradčany (Nymburk District) =

- Municipality
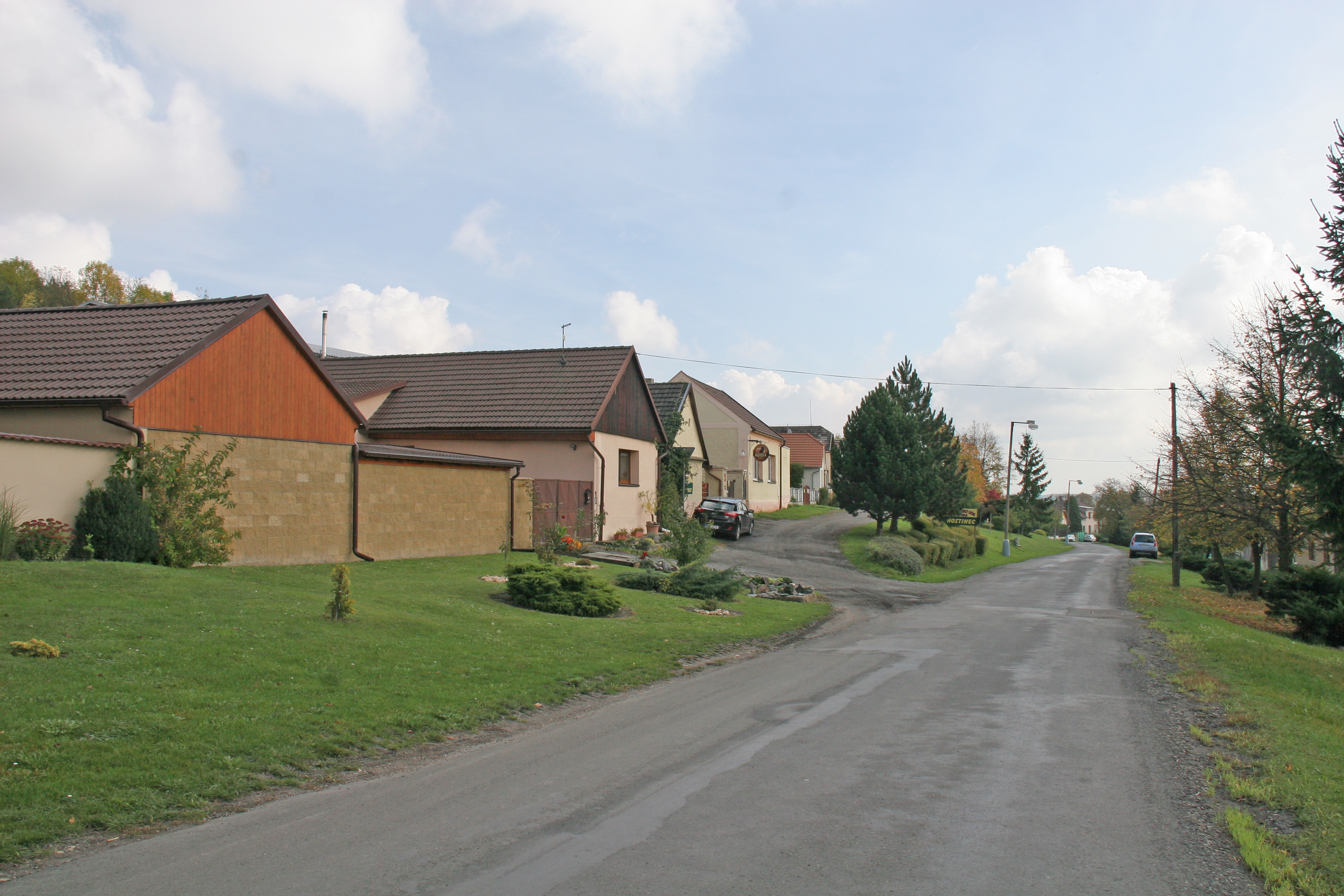
- Main street

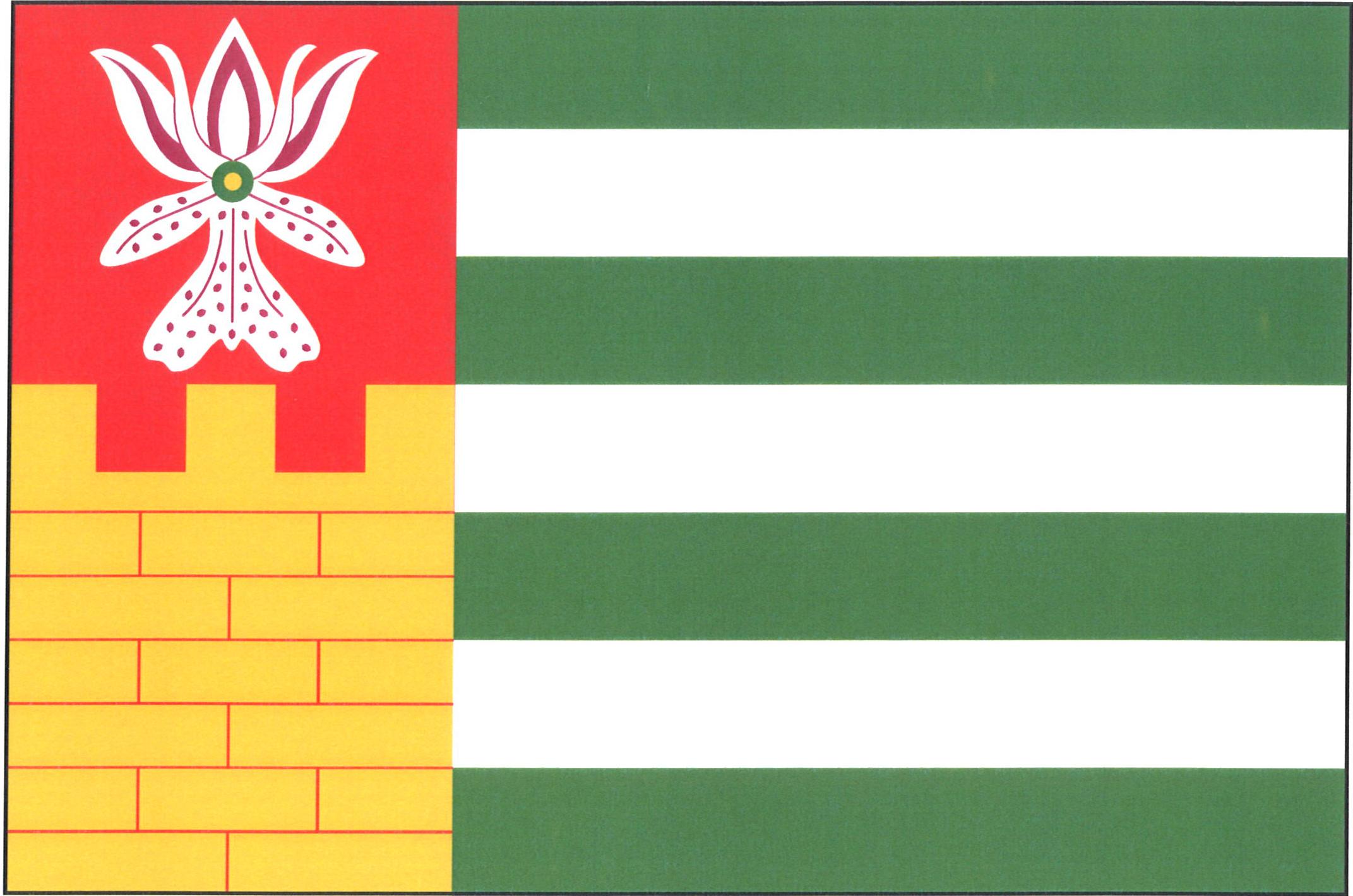
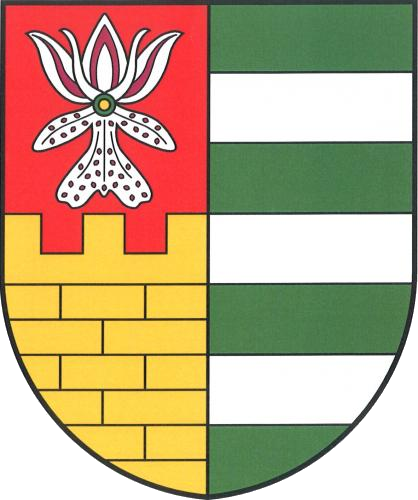
- Flag Coat of arms

- Location in the Czech Republic
- Coordinates: 50°9′29″N 15°16′12″E
- Country: Czech Republic
- Region: Central Bohemian
- District: Nymburk
- First mentioned: 1790

Area
  - Total: 3.82 km^{2} (1.47 sq mi)
- Elevation: 223 m (732 ft)

Population (2026-01-01)
  - Total: 291
  - Density: 76.2/km^{2} (197/sq mi)
- Time zone: UTC+1 (CET)
  - Summer (DST): UTC+2 (CEST)
- Postal code: 289 05
- Website: hradcany-obec.cz

Hradčany is a municipality and village in Nymburk District in the Central Bohemian Region of the Czech Republic. It has about 300 inhabitants.

== Demographics ==
Historical population
| Year | Pop. | ±% |
|---|---|---|
| 1869 | 678 | — |
| 1880 | 712 | +5.0% |
| 1890 | 693 | −2.7% |
| 1900 | 732 | +5.6% |
| 1910 | 701 | −4.2% |
| 1921 | 741 | +5.7% |
| 1930 | 629 | −15.1% |
| 1950 | 449 | −28.6% |
| 1961 | 440 | −2.0% |
| 1970 | 337 | −23.4% |
| 1980 | 284 | −15.7% |
| 1991 | 243 | −14.4% |
| 2001 | 235 | −3.3% |
| 2011 | 249 | +6.0% |
| 2021 | 274 | +10.0% |
Source: Censuses
