= Sloveč =

- Municipality
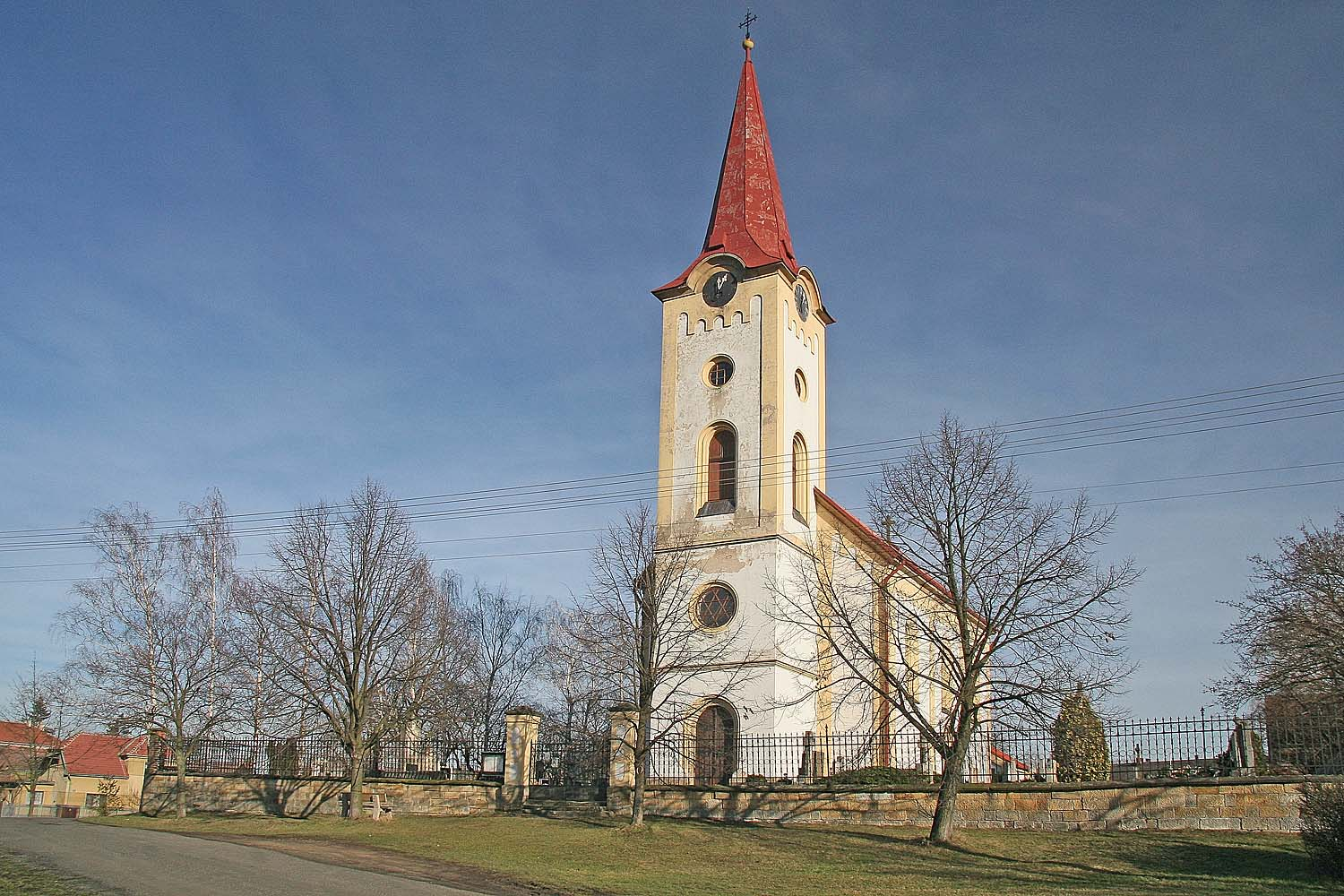
- Church of Saint Martin

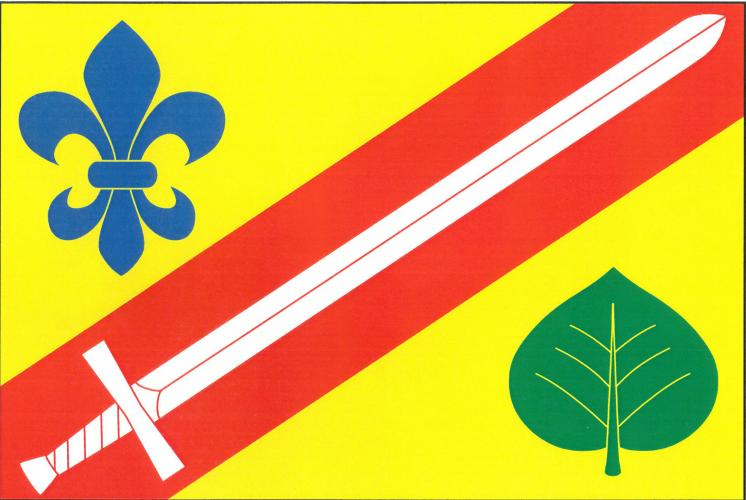
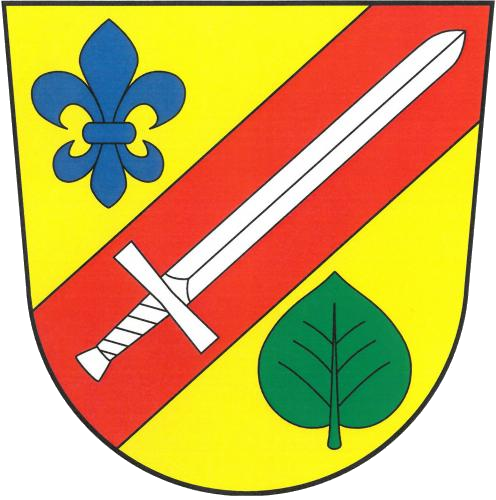
- Flag Coat of arms

- Location in the Czech Republic
- Coordinates: 50°13′48″N 15°19′37″E
- Country: Czech Republic
- Region: Central Bohemian
- District: Nymburk
- First mentioned: 1278

Area
  - Total: 12.52 km^{2} (4.83 sq mi)
- Elevation: 218 m (715 ft)

Population (2026-01-01)
  - Total: 538
  - Density: 43.0/km^{2} (111/sq mi)
- Time zone: UTC+1 (CET)
  - Summer (DST): UTC+2 (CEST)
- Postal code: 289 03
- Website: www.slovec.eu

Sloveč is a municipality and village in Nymburk District in the Central Bohemian Region of the Czech Republic. It has about 500 inhabitants.

== Administrative division ==
Sloveč consists of three municipal parts (in brackets population according to the 2021 census):

- Sloveč (329)
- Kamilov (60)
- Střihov (119)

== Demographics ==
Historical population
Year	Pop.	±%
1869	1,151	—
1880	1,338	+16.2%
1890	1,394	+4.2%
1900	1,328	−4.7%
1910	1,308	−1.5%
1921	1,311	+0.2%
1930	1,211	−7.6%
1950	916	−24.4%
1961	890	−2.8%
1970	754	−15.3%
1980	697	−7.6%
1991	564	−19.1%
2001	532	−5.7%
2011	510	−4.1%
2021	508	−0.4%
Source: Censuses
