= Hořany =

- Municipality
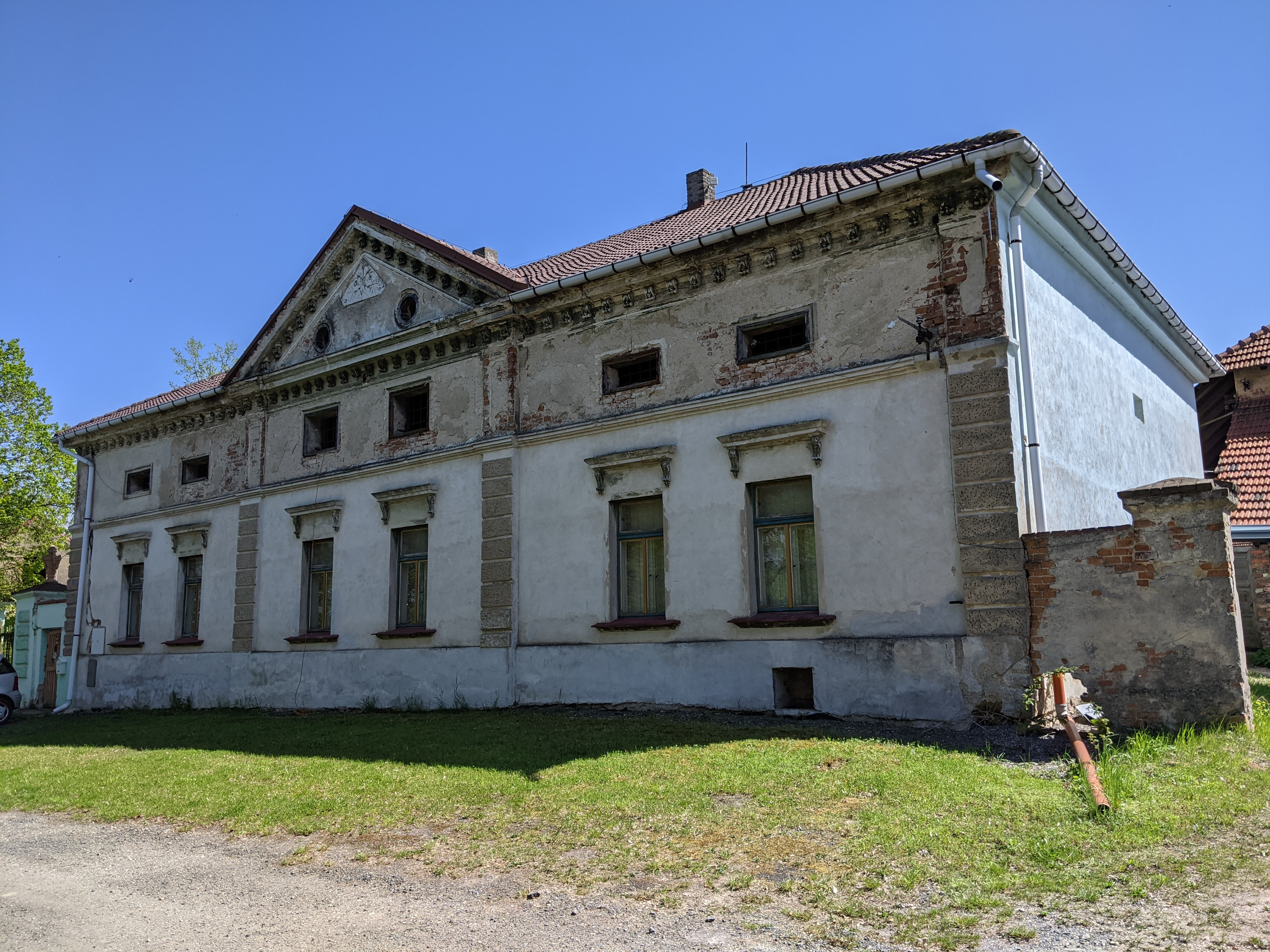
- House No. 2, a cultural monument

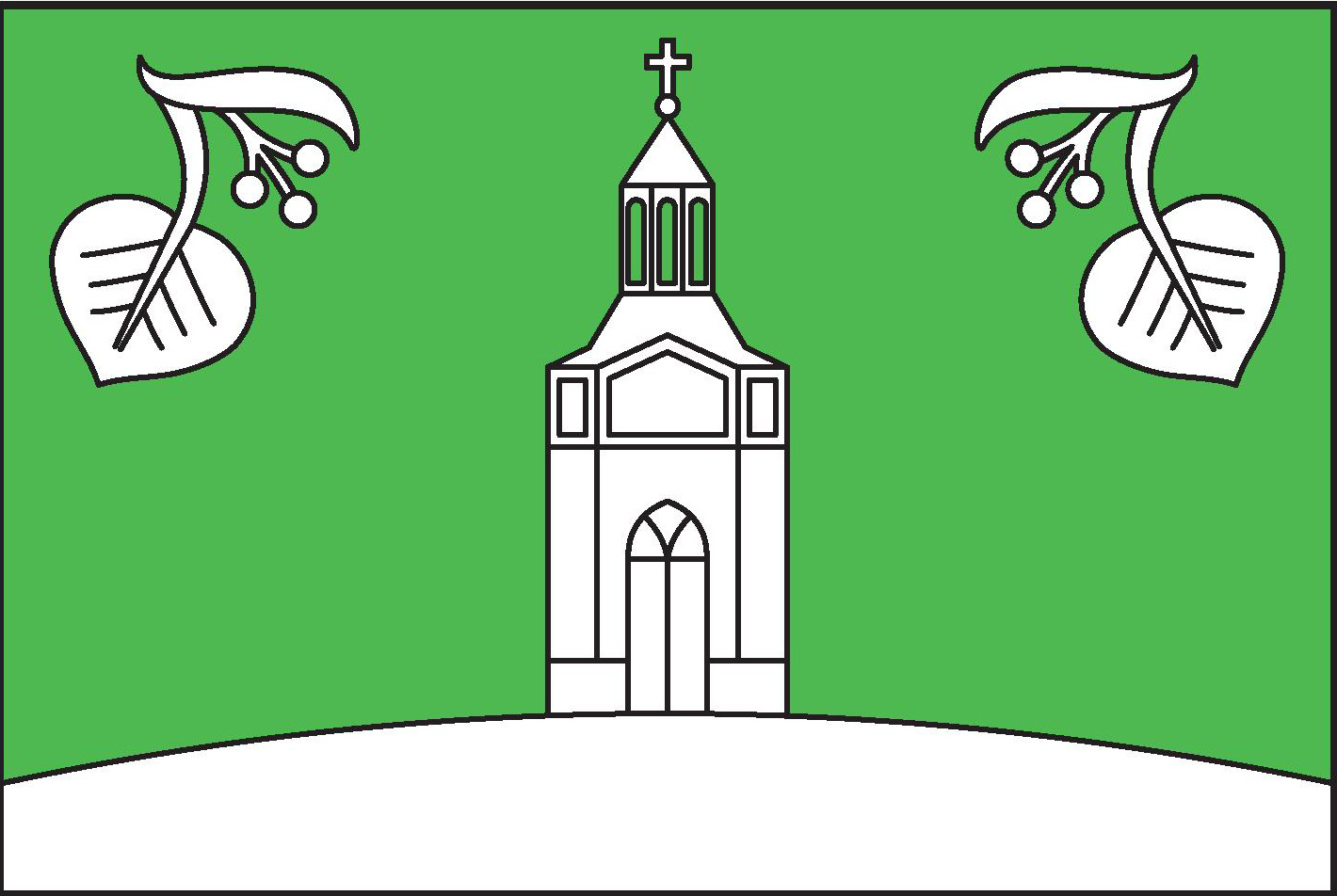
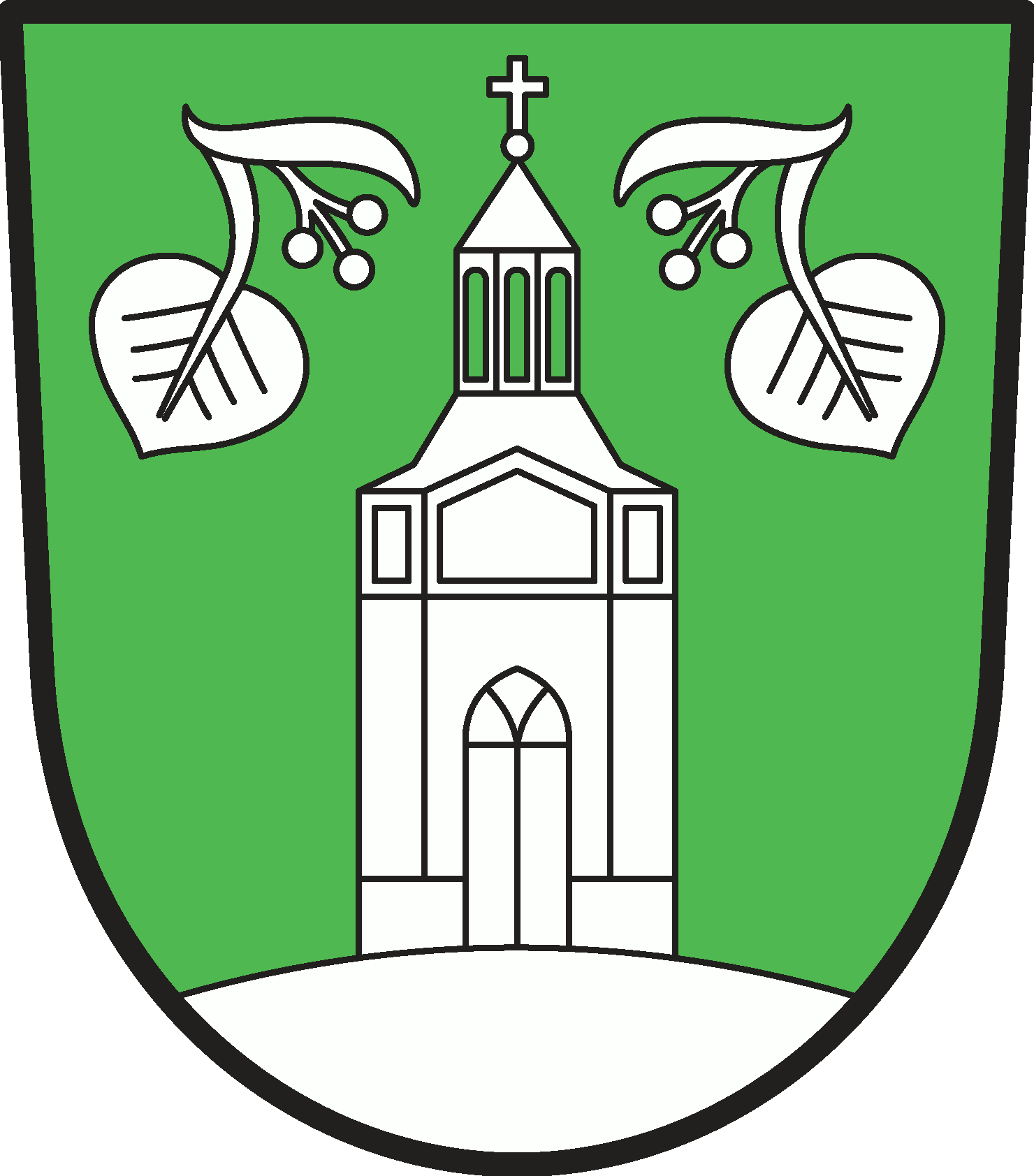
- Flag Coat of arms

- Location in the Czech Republic
- Coordinates: 50°5′52″N 14°56′45″E
- Country: Czech Republic
- Region: Central Bohemian
- District: Nymburk
- First mentioned: 1282

Area
  - Total: 3.79 km^{2} (1.46 sq mi)
- Elevation: 219 m (719 ft)

Population (2026-01-01)
  - Total: 166
  - Density: 43.8/km^{2} (113/sq mi)
- Time zone: UTC+1 (CET)
  - Summer (DST): UTC+2 (CEST)
- Postal code: 289 14
- Website: www.horany.cz

Hořany is a municipality and village in Nymburk District in the Central Bohemian Region of the Czech Republic. It has about 200 inhabitants.

== Demographics ==
Historical population
| Year | Pop. | ±% |
|---|---|---|
| 1869 | 266 | — |
| 1880 | 306 | +15.0% |
| 1890 | 385 | +25.8% |
| 1900 | 386 | +0.3% |
| 1910 | 411 | +6.5% |
| 1921 | 383 | −6.8% |
| 1930 | 426 | +11.2% |
| 1950 | 301 | −29.3% |
| 1961 | 248 | −17.6% |
| 1970 | 177 | −28.6% |
| 1980 | 144 | −18.6% |
| 1991 | 96 | −33.3% |
| 2001 | 96 | +0.0% |
| 2011 | 141 | +46.9% |
| 2021 | 164 | +16.3% |
Source: Censuses
