= Kamenné Zboží =

- Municipality
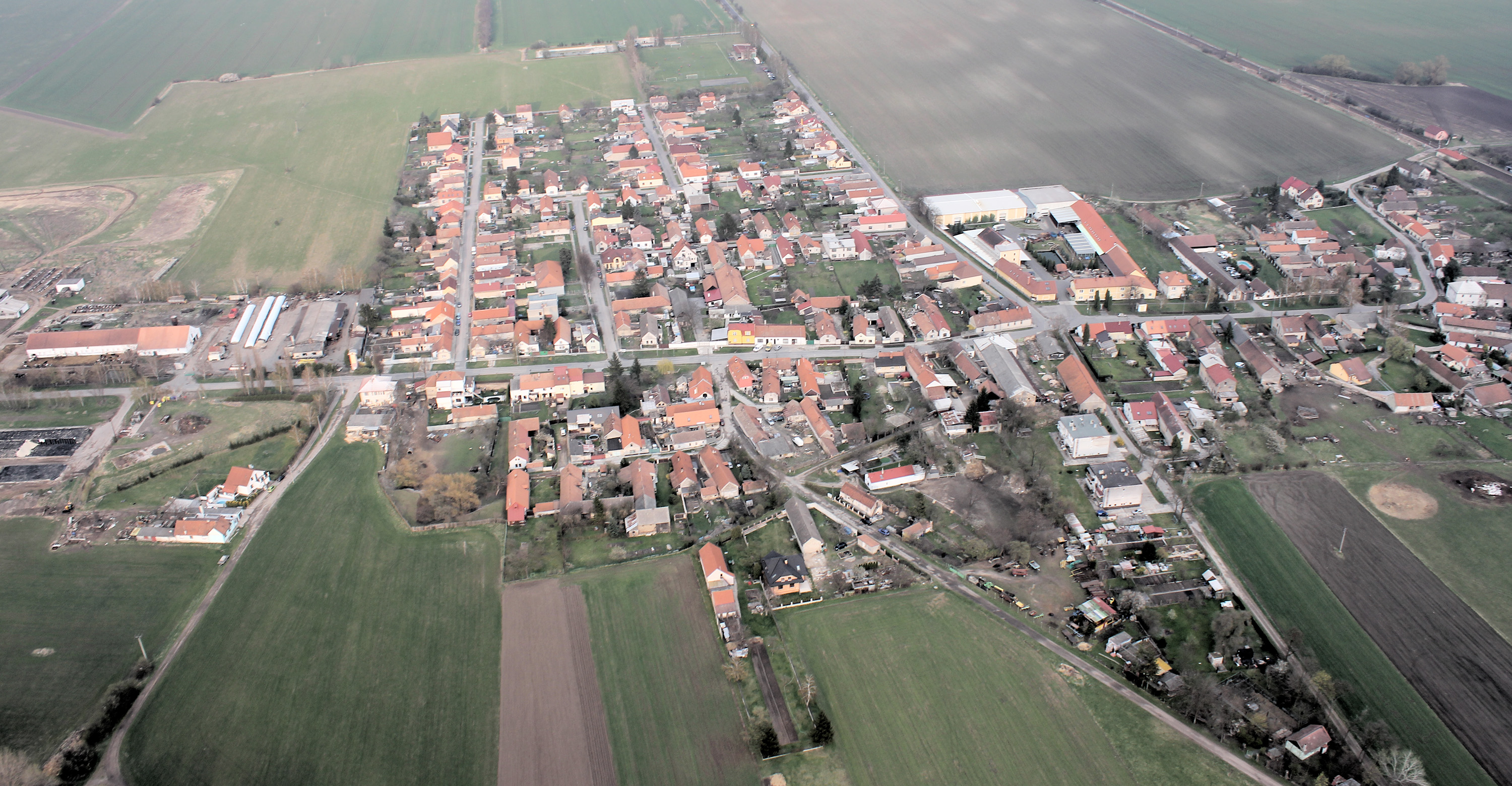
- Aerial view

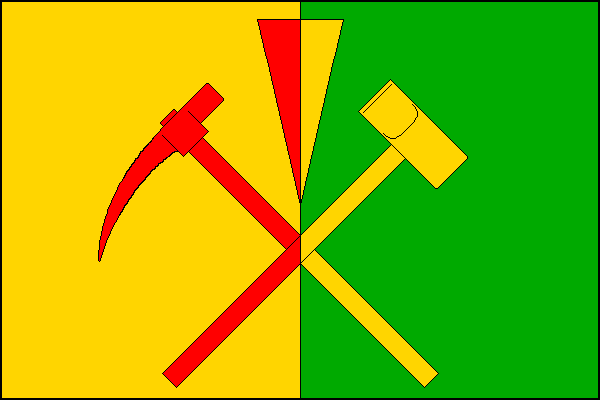
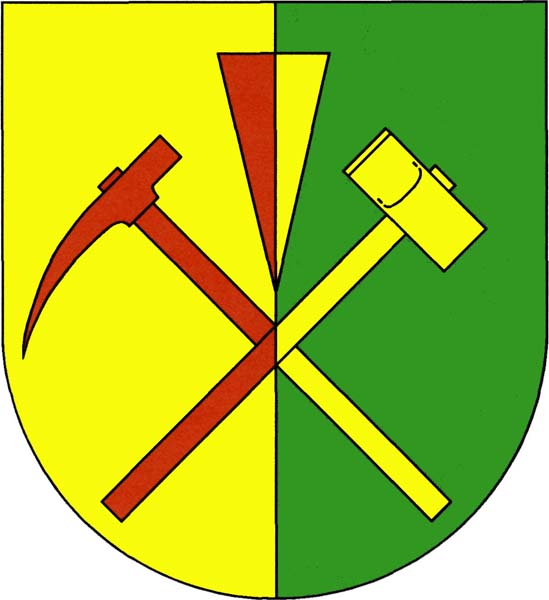
- Flag Coat of arms

- Location in the Czech Republic
- Coordinates: 50°11′9″N 15°20′1″E
- Country: Czech Republic
- Region: Central Bohemian
- District: Nymburk
- First mentioned: 1495

Area
  - Total: 4.66 km^{2} (1.80 sq mi)
- Elevation: 190 m (620 ft)

Population (2026-01-01)
  - Total: 508
  - Density: 109/km^{2} (282/sq mi)
- Time zone: UTC+1 (CET)
  - Summer (DST): UTC+2 (CEST)
- Postal code: 288 02
- Website: www.kamennezbozi.cz

Kamenné Zboží is a municipality and village in Nymburk District in the Central Bohemian Region of the Czech Republic. It has about 500 inhabitants.

== Demographics ==
Historical population
Year	Pop.	±%
1869	309	—
1880	420	+35.9%
1890	484	+15.2%
1900	610	+26.0%
1910	695	+13.9%
1921	679	−2.3%
1930	768	+13.1%
1950	664	−13.5%
1961	608	−8.4%
1970	576	−5.3%
1980	575	−0.2%
1991	498	−13.4%
2001	507	+1.8%
2011	546	+7.7%
2021	525	−3.8%
Source: Censuses
