= Vlkov pod Oškobrhem =

- Municipality
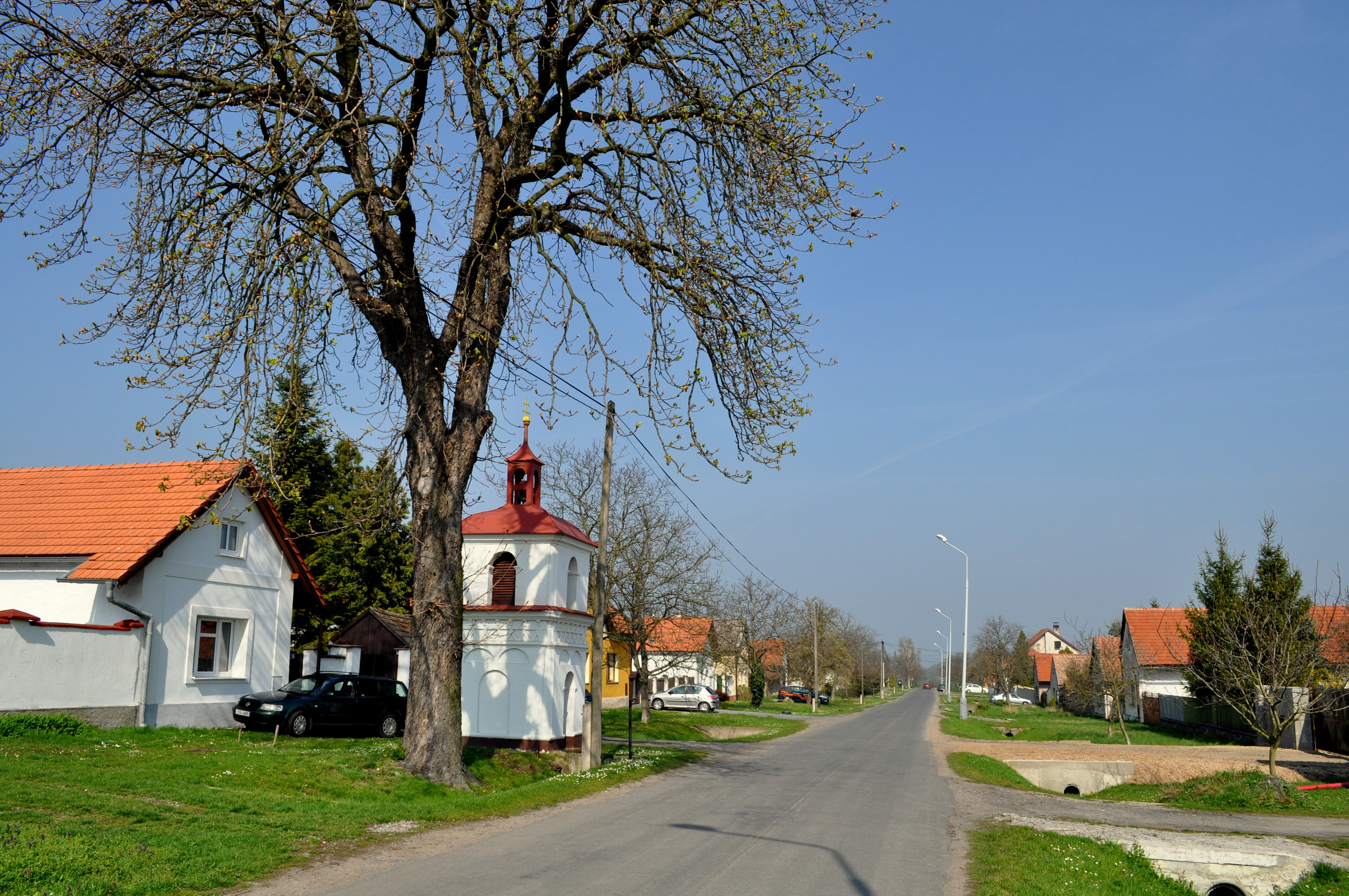
- Chapel of Saints Peter and Paul

- Location in the Czech Republic
- Coordinates: 50°9′22″N 15°13′14″E
- Country: Czech Republic
- Region: Central Bohemian
- District: Nymburk
- First mentioned: 1353

Area
  - Total: 1.46 km^{2} (0.56 sq mi)
- Elevation: 188 m (617 ft)

Population (2026-01-01)
  - Total: 97
  - Density: 66/km^{2} (170/sq mi)
- Time zone: UTC+1 (CET)
  - Summer (DST): UTC+2 (CEST)
- Postal code: 289 04
- Website: www.vlkovpo.cz

Vlkov pod Oškobrhem is a municipality and village in Nymburk District in the Central Bohemian Region of the Czech Republic. It has about 100 inhabitants.

== Demographics ==
Historical population
| Year | Pop. | ±% |
|---|---|---|
| 1869 | 288 | — |
| 1880 | 279 | −3.1% |
| 1890 | 260 | −6.8% |
| 1900 | 281 | +8.1% |
| 1910 | 267 | −5.0% |
| 1921 | 238 | −10.9% |
| 1930 | 217 | −8.8% |
| 1950 | 175 | −19.4% |
| 1961 | 173 | −1.1% |
| 1970 | 160 | −7.5% |
| 1980 | 124 | −22.5% |
| 1991 | 85 | −31.5% |
| 2001 | 84 | −1.2% |
| 2011 | 104 | +23.8% |
| 2021 | 96 | −7.7% |
Source: Censuses
