= Oseček =

- Municipality
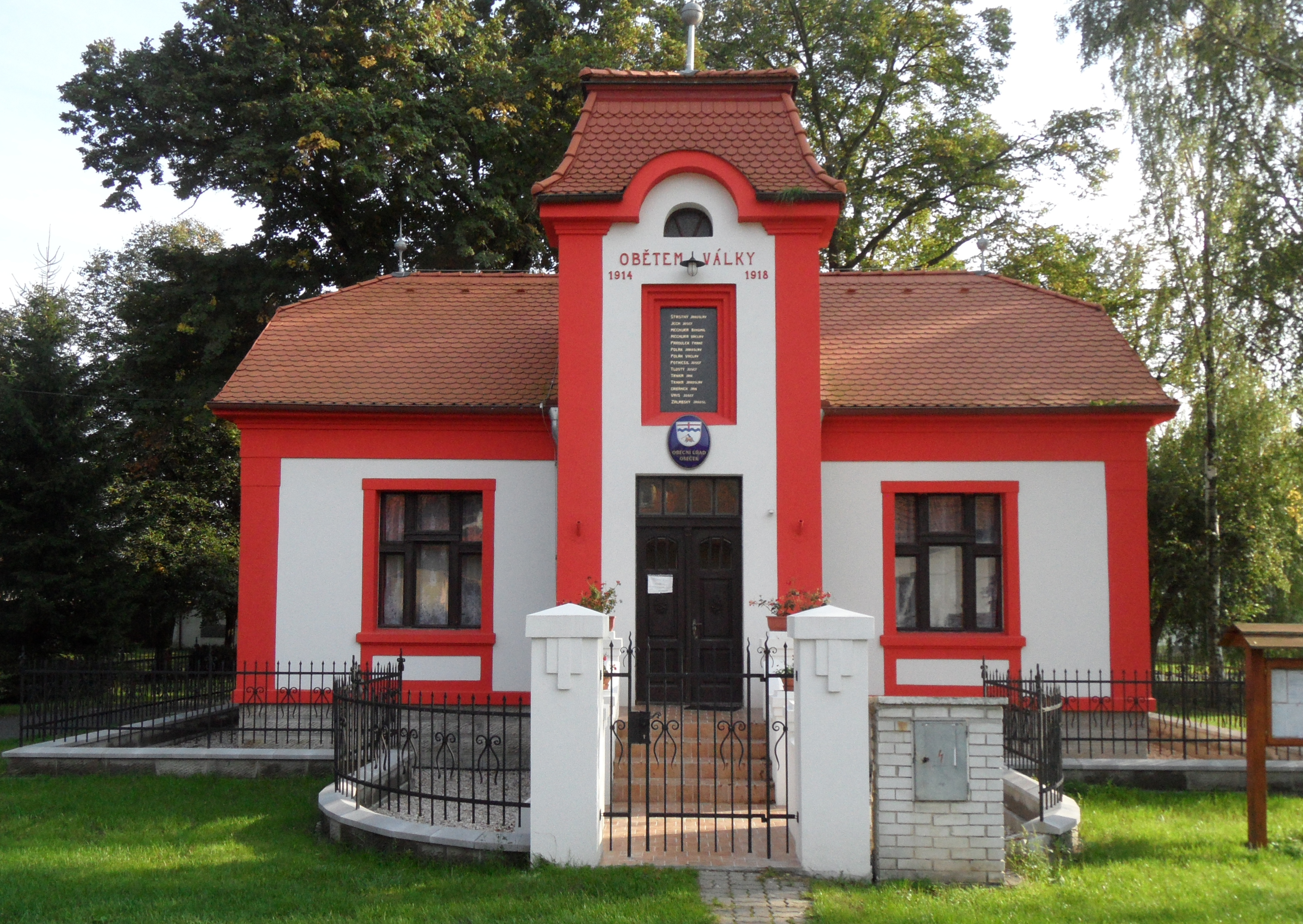
- Municipal office

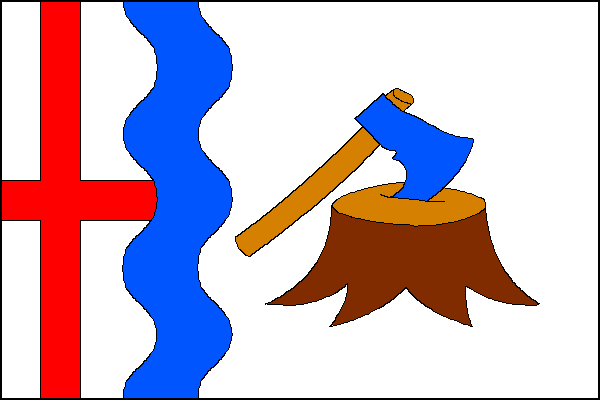
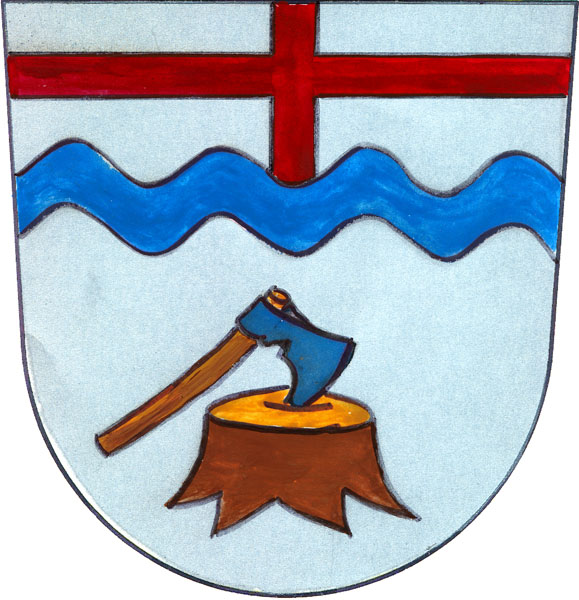
- Flag Coat of arms

- Location in the Czech Republic
- Coordinates: 50°6′6″N 15°8′55″E
- Country: Czech Republic
- Region: Central Bohemian
- District: Nymburk
- First mentioned: 1227

Area
  - Total: 4.88 km^{2} (1.88 sq mi)
- Elevation: 191 m (627 ft)

Population (2026-01-01)
  - Total: 166
  - Density: 34.0/km^{2} (88.1/sq mi)
- Time zone: UTC+1 (CET)
  - Summer (DST): UTC+2 (CEST)
- Postal code: 289 41
- Website: www.osecek.cz

Oseček is a municipality and village in Nymburk District in the Central Bohemian Region of the Czech Republic. It has about 200 inhabitants.

== Demographics ==
Historical population
Year	Pop.	±%
1869	250	—
1880	317	+26.8%
1890	299	−5.7%
1900	286	−4.3%
1910	322	+12.6%
1921	332	+3.1%
1930	305	−8.1%
1950	262	−14.1%
1961	255	−2.7%
1970	236	−7.5%
1980	161	−31.8%
1991	125	−22.4%
2001	110	−12.0%
2011	143	+30.0%
2021	174	+21.7%
Source: Censuses
