= Kolaje =

- Municipality
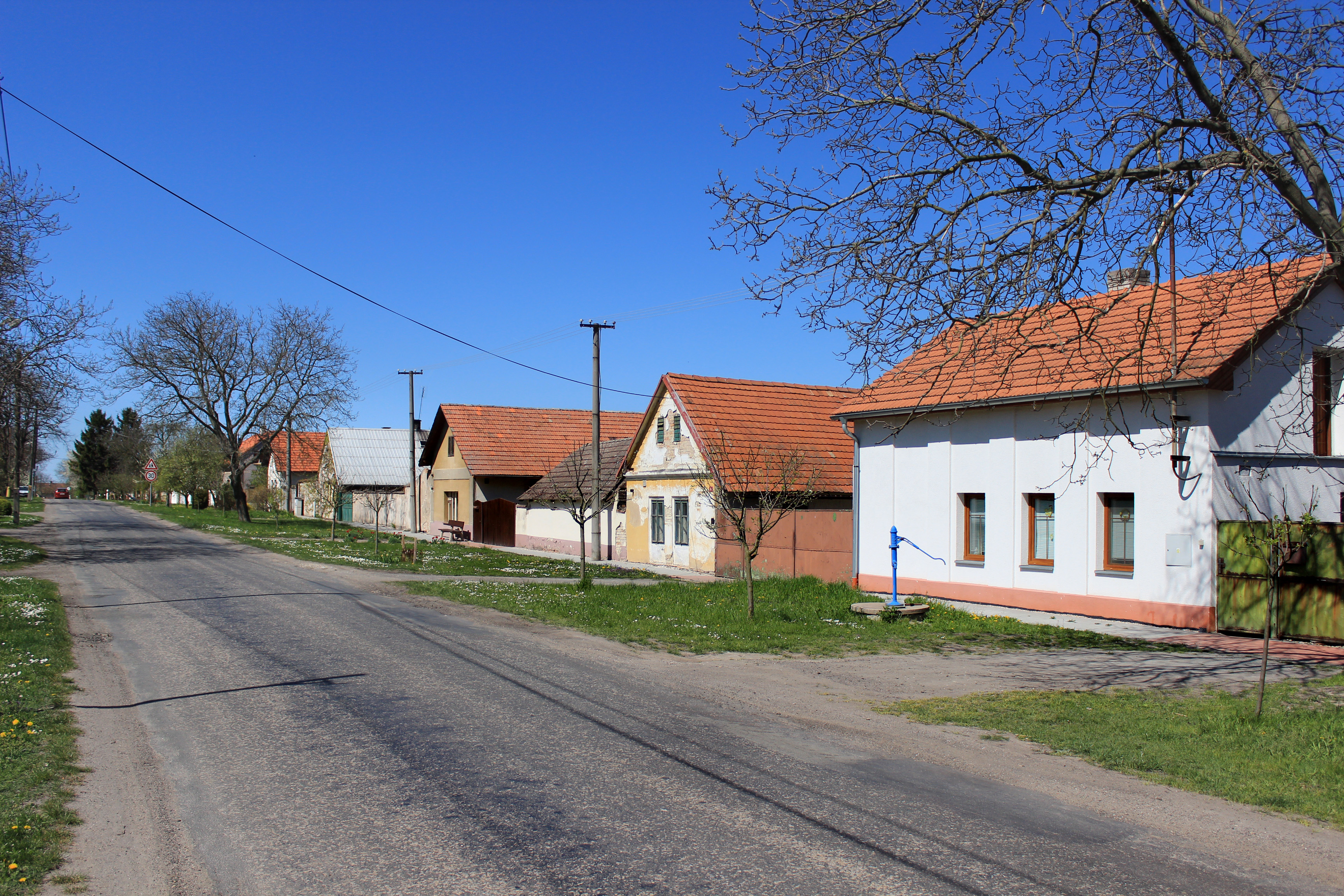
- Main street

- Location in the Czech Republic
- Coordinates: 50°9′20″N 15°14′19″E
- Country: Czech Republic
- Region: Central Bohemian
- District: Nymburk
- First mentioned: 1790

Area
  - Total: 1.59 km^{2} (0.61 sq mi)
- Elevation: 203 m (666 ft)

Population (2026-01-01)
  - Total: 85
  - Density: 53/km^{2} (140/sq mi)
- Time zone: UTC+1 (CET)
  - Summer (DST): UTC+2 (CEST)
- Postal code: 289 04
- Website: www.kolaje.cz

Kolaje is a municipality and village in Nymburk District in the Central Bohemian Region of the Czech Republic. It has about 90 inhabitants.

== Demographics ==
Historical population
Year	Pop.	±%
1869	237	—
1880	305	+28.7%
1890	282	−7.5%
1900	291	+3.2%
1910	279	−4.1%
1921	285	+2.2%
1930	270	−5.3%
1950	179	−33.7%
1961	173	−3.4%
1970	150	−13.3%
1980	128	−14.7%
1991	102	−20.3%
2001	90	−11.8%
2011	87	−3.3%
2021	88	+1.1%
Source: Censuses
