= Činěves =

- Municipality
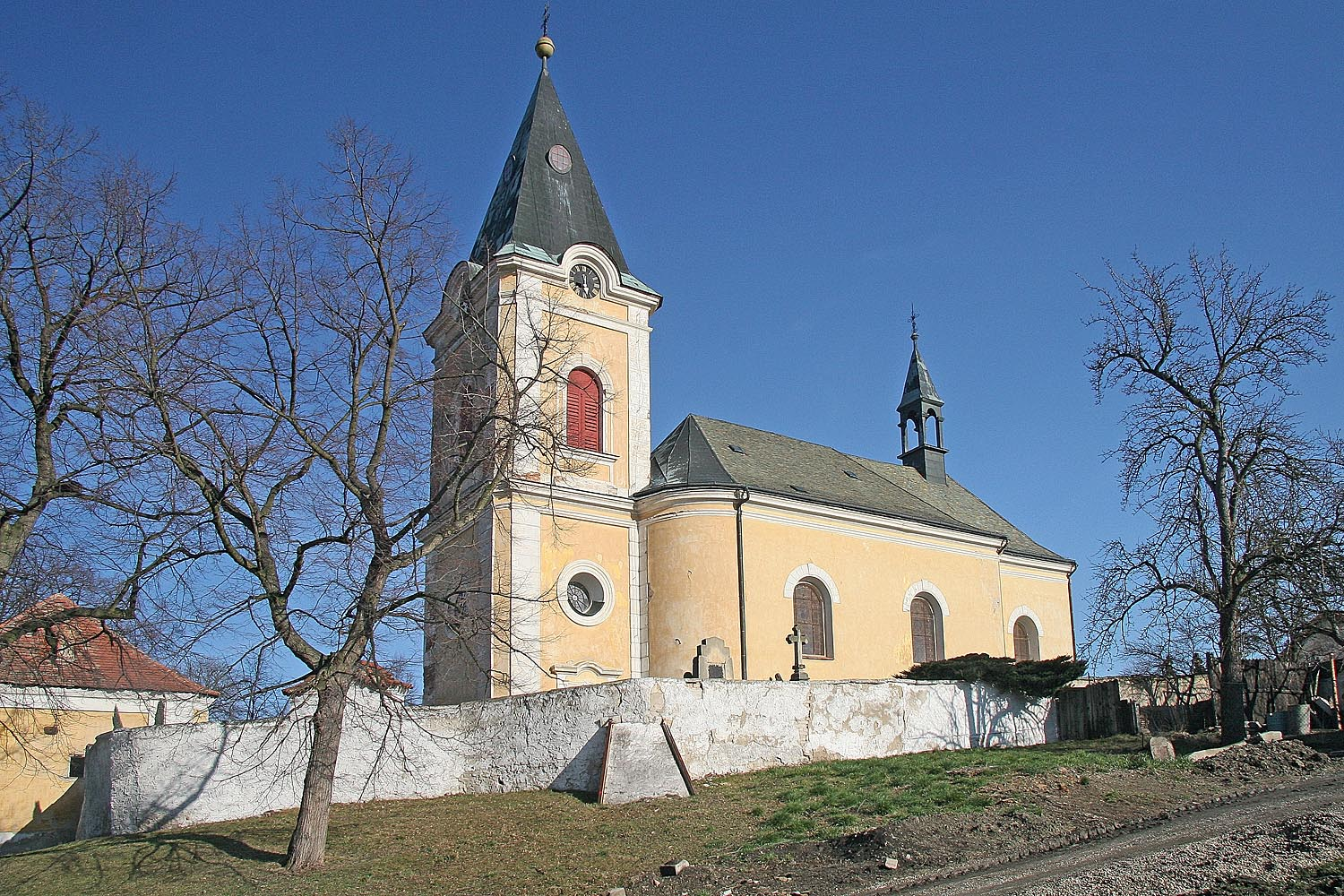
- Church of Saint Wenceslaus

- Location in the Czech Republic
- Coordinates: 50°13′48″N 15°12′50″E
- Country: Czech Republic
- Region: Central Bohemian
- District: Nymburk
- First mentioned: 1294

Area
  - Total: 14.45 km^{2} (5.58 sq mi)
- Elevation: 201 m (659 ft)

Population (2026-01-01)
  - Total: 503
  - Density: 34.8/km^{2} (90.2/sq mi)
- Time zone: UTC+1 (CET)
  - Summer (DST): UTC+2 (CEST)
- Postal code: 289 01
- Website: www.cineves.cz

Činěves is a municipality and village in Nymburk District in the Central Bohemian Region of the Czech Republic. It has about 500 inhabitants.

== Geography ==
Činěves is located about 13 kilometres (8 mi) east of Nymburk and 49 km (30 mi) east of Prague. It lies in a flat landscape in the Central Elbe Table.

== Demographics ==
Historical population
Year	Pop.	±%
1869	944	—
1880	1,085	+14.9%
1890	1,088	+0.3%
1900	1,101	+1.2%
1910	1,200	+9.0%
1921	1,158	−3.5%
1930	1,065	−8.0%
1950	773	−27.4%
1961	771	−0.3%
1970	680	−11.8%
1980	615	−9.6%
1991	518	−15.8%
2001	475	−8.3%
2011	519	+9.3%
2021	511	−1.5%
Source: Censuses
