= Zbožíčko =

- Municipality
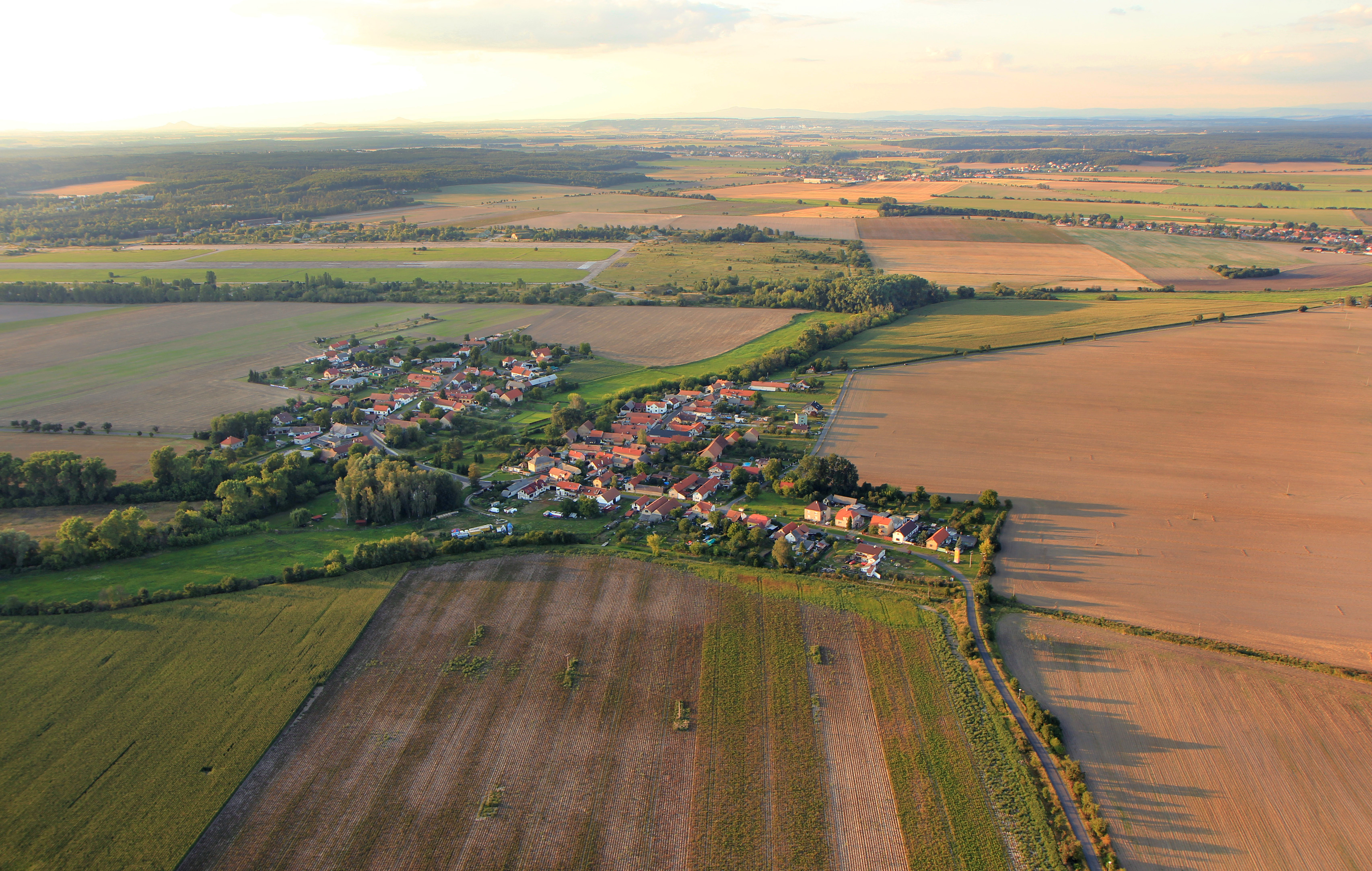
- Aerial view from the south

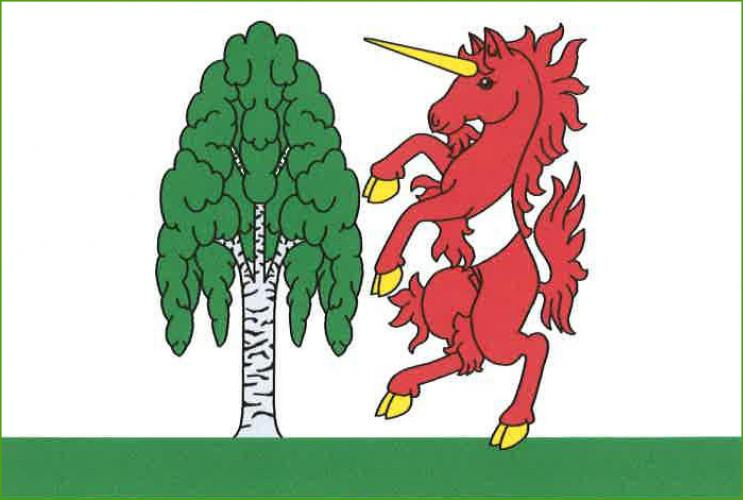
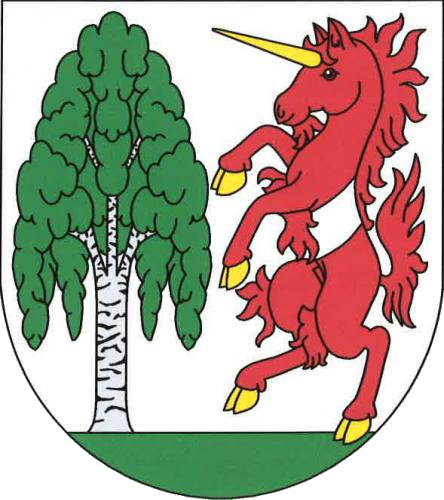
- Flag Coat of arms

- Location in the Czech Republic
- Coordinates: 50°13′33″N 14°56′24″E
- Country: Czech Republic
- Region: Central Bohemian
- District: Nymburk
- First mentioned: 1410

Area
  - Total: 4.28 km^{2} (1.65 sq mi)
- Elevation: 193 m (633 ft)

Population (2026-01-01)
  - Total: 291
  - Density: 68.0/km^{2} (176/sq mi)
- Time zone: UTC+1 (CET)
  - Summer (DST): UTC+2 (CEST)
- Postal code: 289 25
- Website: www.obeczbozicko.cz

Zbožíčko is a municipality and village in Nymburk District in the Central Bohemian Region of the Czech Republic. It has about 300 inhabitants.

== Demographics ==
Historical population
| Year | Pop. | ±% |
|---|---|---|
| 1869 | 247 | — |
| 1880 | 260 | +5.3% |
| 1890 | 332 | +27.7% |
| 1900 | 333 | +0.3% |
| 1910 | 326 | −2.1% |
| 1921 | 369 | +13.2% |
| 1930 | 352 | −4.6% |
| 1950 | 299 | −15.1% |
| 1961 | 287 | −4.0% |
| 1970 | 269 | −6.3% |
| 1980 | 208 | −22.7% |
| 1991 | 161 | −22.6% |
| 2001 | 175 | +8.7% |
| 2011 | 189 | +8.0% |
| 2021 | 263 | +39.2% |
Source: Censuses
