= Jizbice =

- Municipality
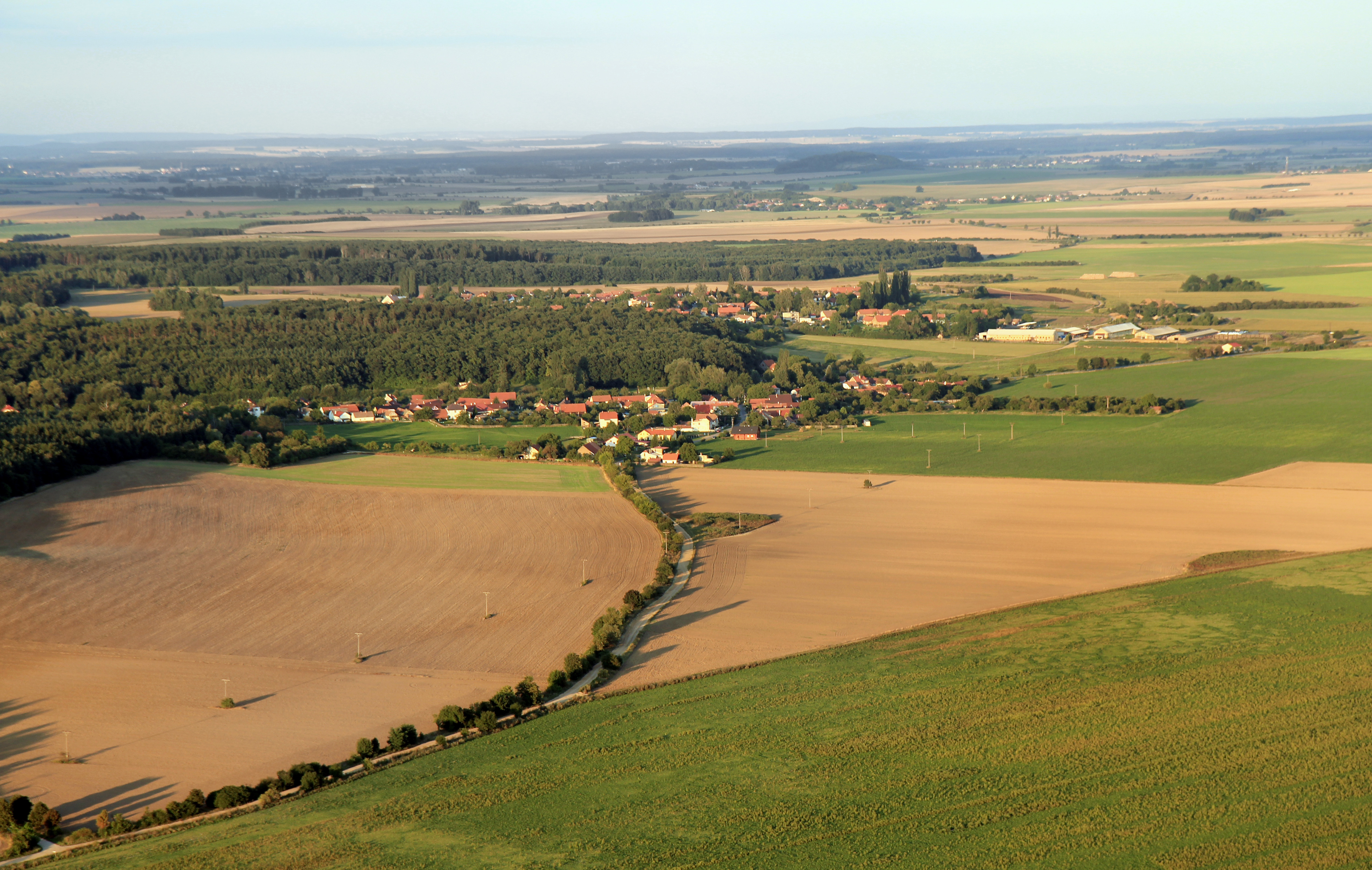
- Aerial view

- Location in the Czech Republic
- Coordinates: 50°15′28″N 14°59′38″E
- Country: Czech Republic
- Region: Central Bohemian
- District: Nymburk
- First mentioned: 1223

Area
  - Total: 5.31 km^{2} (2.05 sq mi)
- Elevation: 235 m (771 ft)

Population (2026-01-01)
  - Total: 395
  - Density: 74.4/km^{2} (193/sq mi)
- Time zone: UTC+1 (CET)
  - Summer (DST): UTC+2 (CEST)
- Postal code: 288 02
- Website: www.jizbice.cz

Jizbice is a municipality and village in Nymburk District in the Central Bohemian Region of the Czech Republic. It has about 400 inhabitants.

== Administrative division ==
Jizbice consists of two municipal parts (in brackets population according to the 2021 census):

- Jizbice (146)
- Zavadilka (229)

== Demographics ==
Historical population
Year	Pop.	±%
1869	369	—
1880	490	+32.8%
1890	503	+2.7%
1900	497	−1.2%
1910	504	+1.4%
1921	486	−3.6%
1930	479	−1.4%
1950	437	−8.8%
1961	444	+1.6%
1970	412	−7.2%
1980	331	−19.7%
1991	293	−11.5%
2001	289	−1.4%
2011	326	+12.8%
2021	375	+15.0%
Source: Censuses
