= Jíkev =

- Municipality
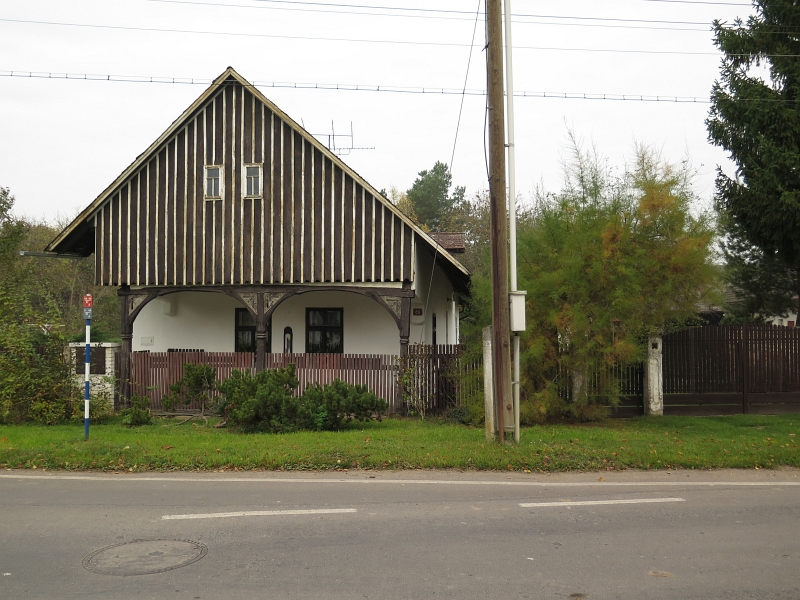
- Homestead No. 86

- Flag Coat of arms

- Location in the Czech Republic
- Coordinates: 50°15′52″N 15°3′36″E
- Country: Czech Republic
- Region: Central Bohemian
- District: Nymburk
- First mentioned: 1323

Area
  - Total: 9.18 km^{2} (3.54 sq mi)
- Elevation: 196 m (643 ft)

Population (2026-01-01)
  - Total: 349
  - Density: 38.0/km^{2} (98.5/sq mi)
- Time zone: UTC+1 (CET)
  - Summer (DST): UTC+2 (CEST)
- Postal code: 289 32
- Website: www.jikev.cz

Jíkev is a municipality and village in Nymburk District in the Central Bohemian Region of the Czech Republic. It has about 300 inhabitants.

== Demographics ==
Historical population
Year	Pop.	±%
1869	708	—
1880	813	+14.8%
1890	831	+2.2%
1900	851	+2.4%
1910	840	−1.3%
1921	830	−1.2%
1930	722	−13.0%
1950	587	−18.7%
1961	545	−7.2%
1970	474	−13.0%
1980	405	−14.6%
1991	314	−22.5%
2001	304	−3.2%
2011	300	−1.3%
2021	331	+10.3%
Source: Censuses
