= Čilec =

- Municipality
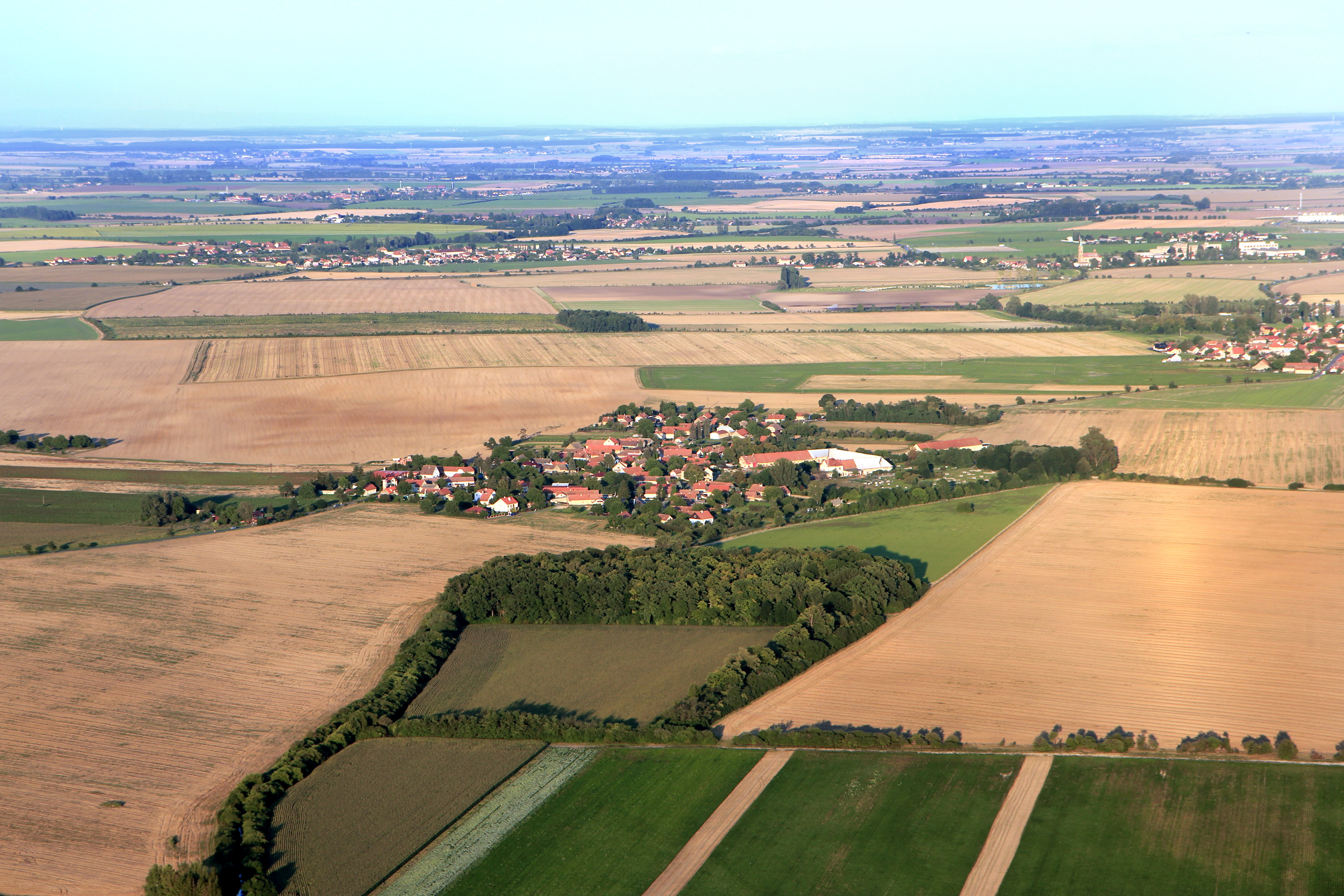
- Aerial view

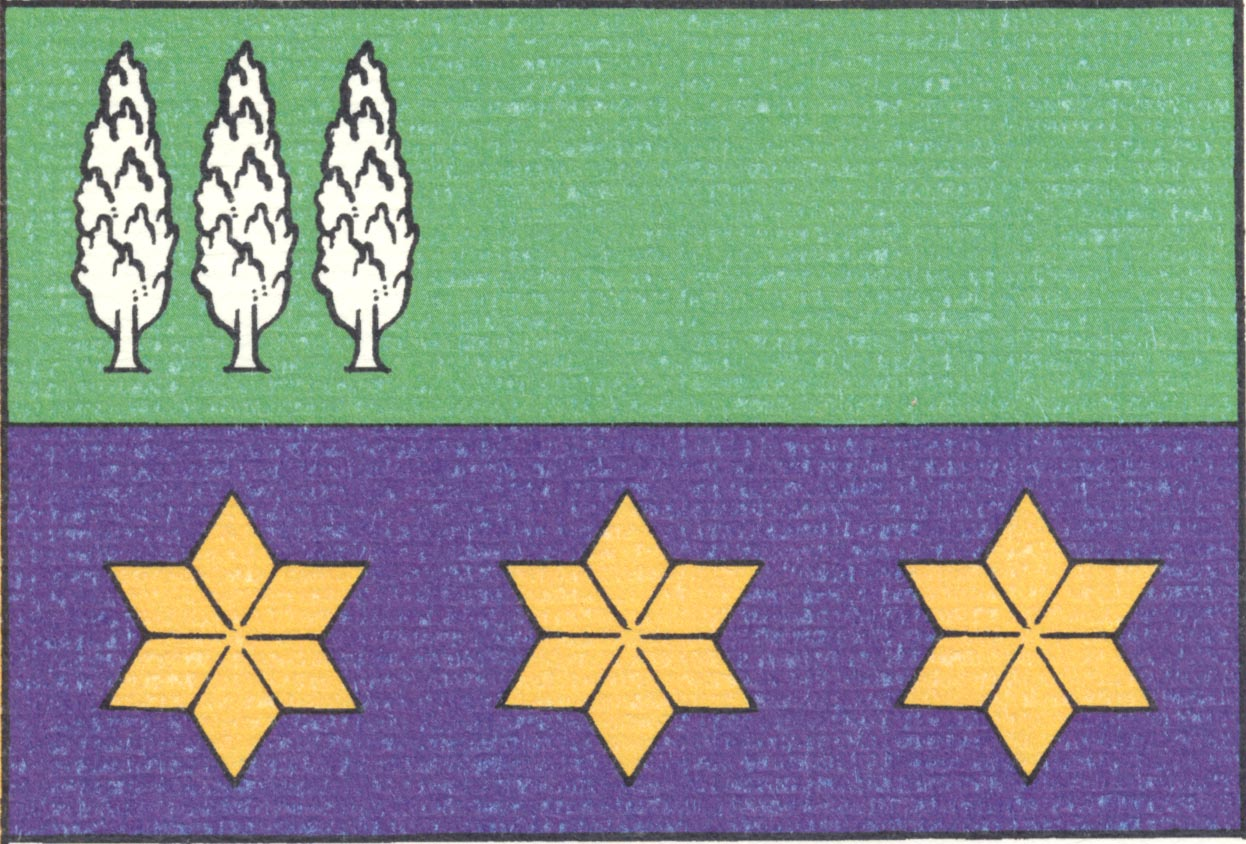
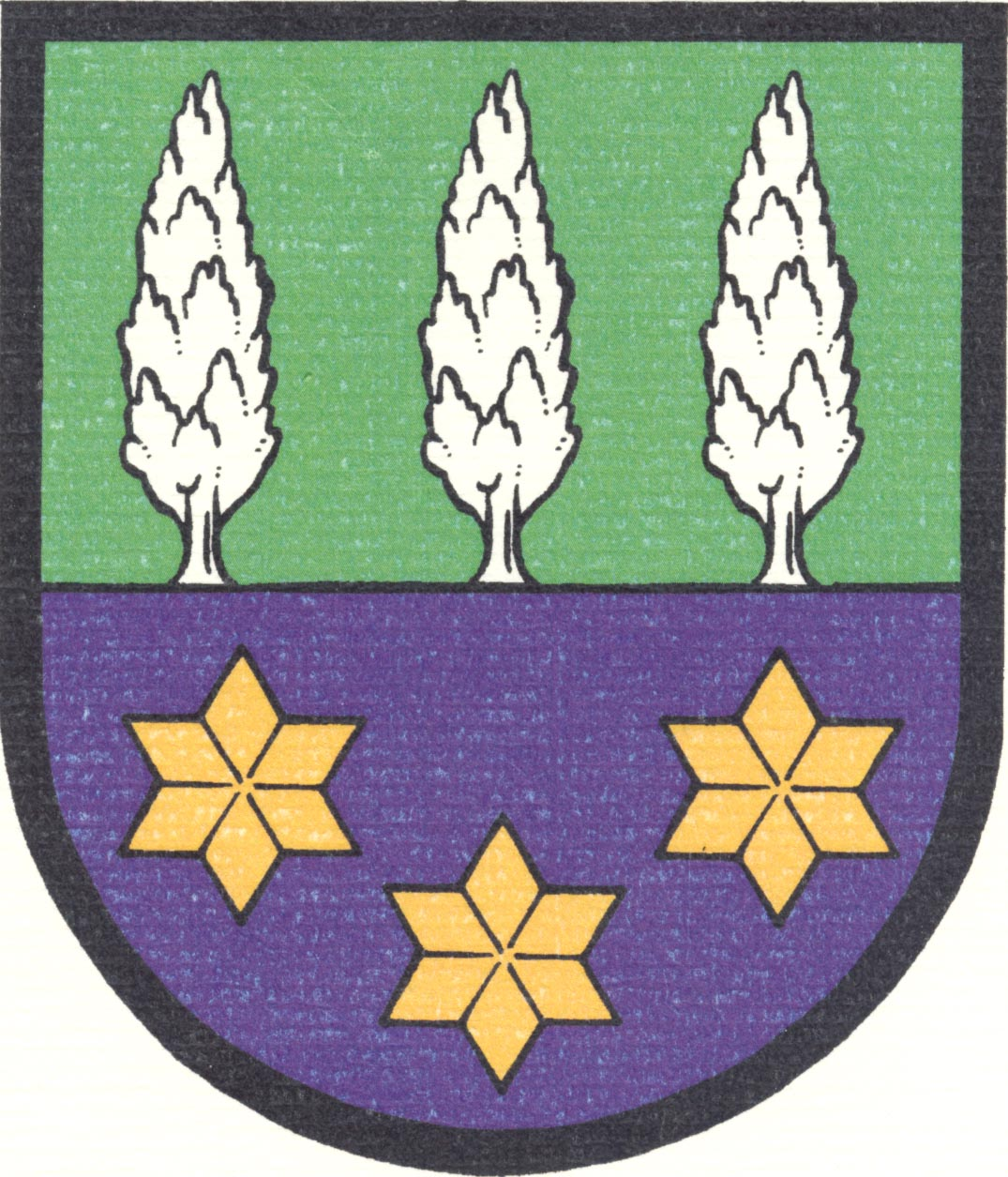
- Flag Coat of arms

- Location in the Czech Republic
- Coordinates: 50°13′10″N 14°58′54″E
- Country: Czech Republic
- Region: Central Bohemian
- District: Nymburk
- First mentioned: 1398

Area
  - Total: 4.60 km^{2} (1.78 sq mi)
- Elevation: 196 m (643 ft)

Population (2026-01-01)
  - Total: 243
  - Density: 52.8/km^{2} (137/sq mi)
- Time zone: UTC+1 (CET)
  - Summer (DST): UTC+2 (CEST)
- Postal code: 289 25
- Website: www.cilec.cz

Čilec is a municipality and village in Nymburk District in the Central Bohemian Region of the Czech Republic. It has about 200 inhabitants.

== Demographics ==
Historical population
Year	Pop.	±%
1869	228	—
1880	312	+36.8%
1890	313	+0.3%
1900	313	+0.0%
1910	350	+11.8%
1921	357	+2.0%
1930	377	+5.6%
1950	317	−15.9%
1961	306	−3.5%
1970	296	−3.3%
1980	281	−5.1%
1991	223	−20.6%
2001	193	−13.5%
2011	216	+11.9%
2021	219	+1.4%
Source: Censuses
