= Žitovlice =

- Municipality
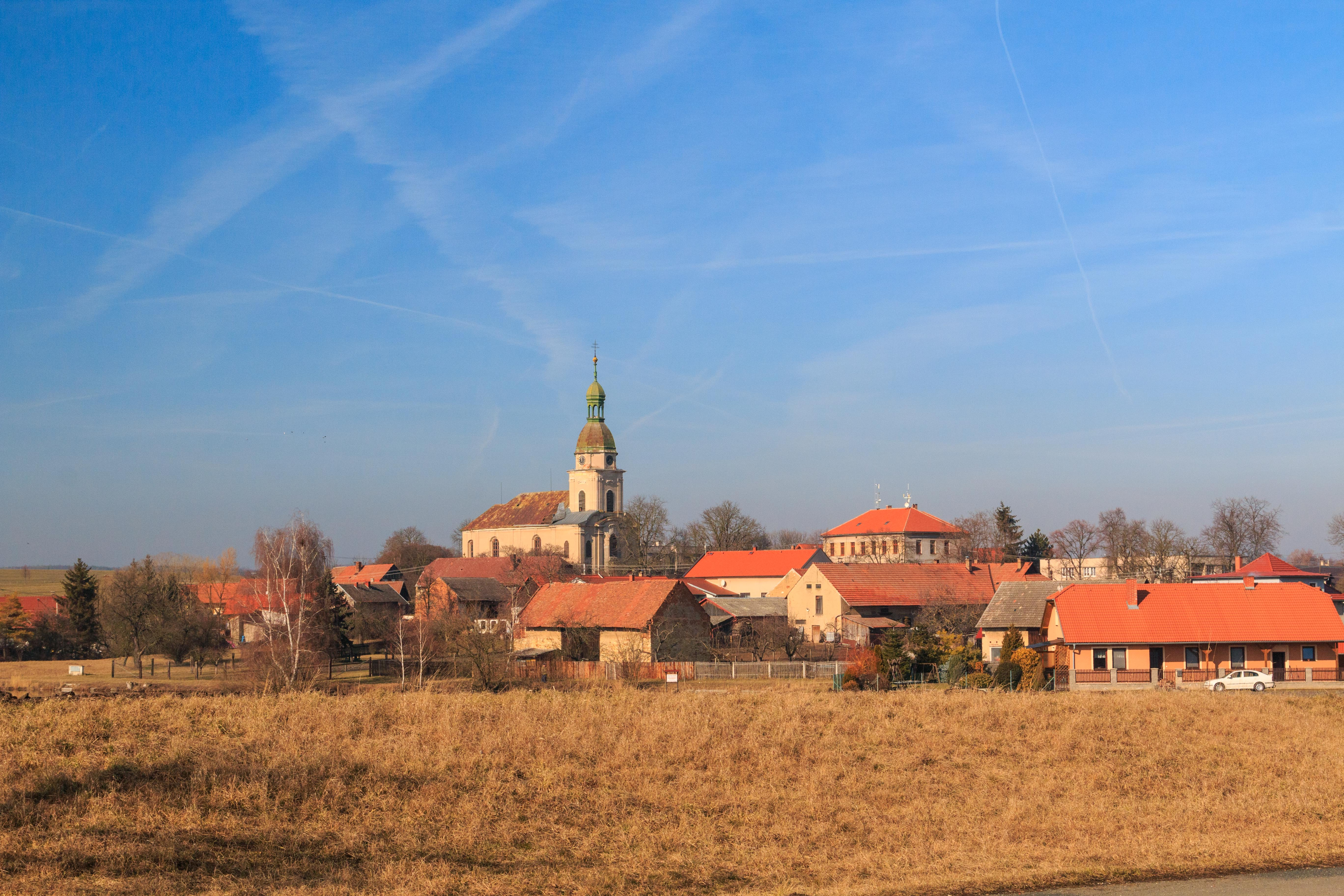
- View from the east

- Location in the Czech Republic
- Coordinates: 50°17′39″N 15°8′13″E
- Country: Czech Republic
- Region: Central Bohemian
- District: Nymburk
- First mentioned: 1352

Area
  - Total: 6.59 km^{2} (2.54 sq mi)
- Elevation: 208 m (682 ft)

Population (2026-01-01)
  - Total: 219
  - Density: 33.2/km^{2} (86.1/sq mi)
- Time zone: UTC+1 (CET)
  - Summer (DST): UTC+2 (CEST)
- Postal code: 289 34
- Website: www.zitovlice.cz

Žitovlice is a municipality and village in Nymburk District in the Central Bohemian Region of the Czech Republic. It has about 200 inhabitants.

== Administrative division ==
Žitovlice consists of two municipal parts (in brackets population according to the 2021 census):

- Žitovlice (133)
- Pojedy (46)

== Demographics ==
Historical population
Year	Pop.	±%
1869	678	—
1880	754	+11.2%
1890	753	−0.1%
1900	691	−8.2%
1910	647	−6.4%
1921	672	+3.9%
1930	618	−8.0%
1950	471	−23.8%
1961	389	−17.4%
1970	315	−19.0%
1980	266	−15.6%
1991	209	−21.4%
2001	165	−21.1%
2011	174	+5.5%
2021	179	+2.9%
Source: Censuses
