= Milčice =

- Municipality
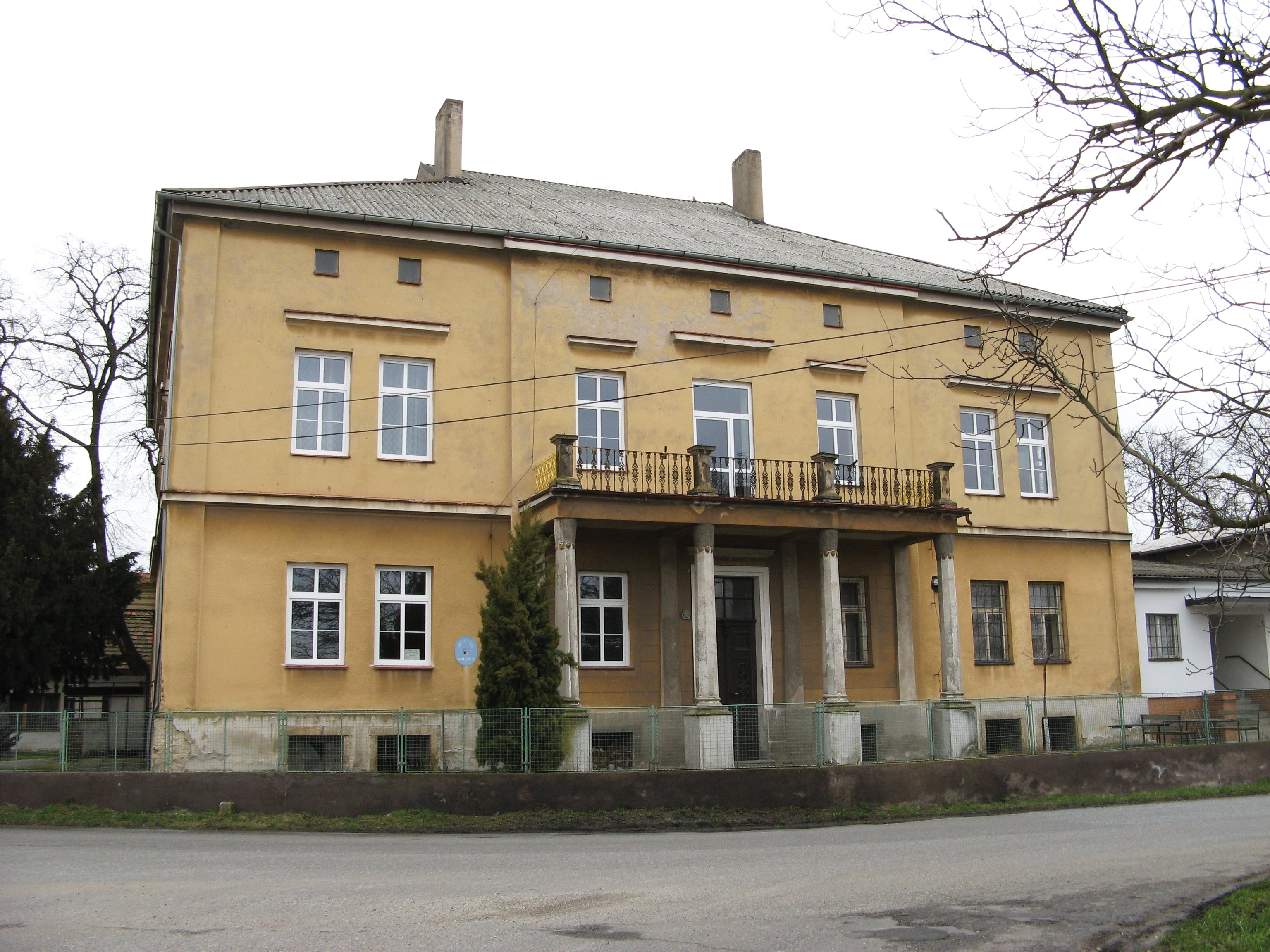
- Municipal office

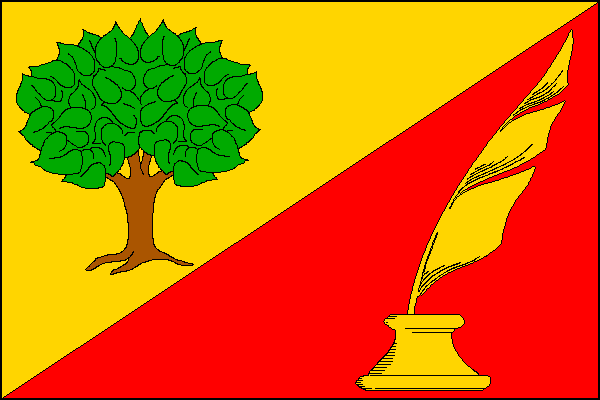
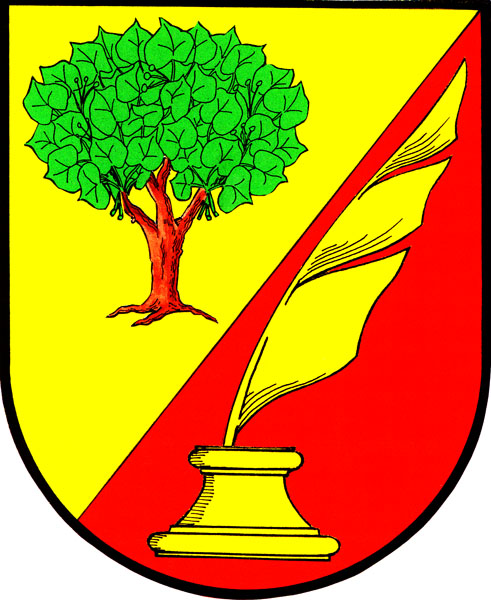
- Flag Coat of arms

- Location in the Czech Republic
- Coordinates: 50°6′20″N 14°59′30″E
- Country: Czech Republic
- Region: Central Bohemian
- District: Nymburk
- First mentioned: 1294

Area
  - Total: 6.51 km^{2} (2.51 sq mi)
- Elevation: 190 m (620 ft)

Population (2026-01-01)
  - Total: 303
  - Density: 46.5/km^{2} (121/sq mi)
- Time zone: UTC+1 (CET)
  - Summer (DST): UTC+2 (CEST)
- Postal code: 289 11
- Website: www.obec-milcice.cz

Milčice is a municipality and village in Nymburk District in the Central Bohemian Region of the Czech Republic. It has about 300 inhabitants.

== Demographics ==
Historical population
Year	Pop.	±%
1869	369	—
1880	376	+1.9%
1890	381	+1.3%
1900	331	−13.1%
1910	363	+9.7%
1921	372	+2.5%
1930	376	+1.1%
1950	311	−17.3%
1961	363	+16.7%
1970	350	−3.6%
1980	351	+0.3%
1991	285	−18.8%
2001	312	+9.5%
2011	304	−2.6%
2021	291	−4.3%
Source: Censuses
