= Markvartice =

Markvartice may refer to places in the Czech Republic:

- Markvartice (Děčín District), a municipality and village in the Ústí nad Labem Region
- Markvartice (Jičín District), a municipality and village in the Hradec Králové Region
- Markvartice (Jihlava District), a municipality and village in the Vysočina Region
- Markvartice (Třebíč District), a municipality and village in the Vysočina Region
- Markvartice, a town part of Jablonné v Podještědí in the Liberec Region
- Markvartice, a village and part of Zubčice in the South Bohemian Region
