= Mrlina =

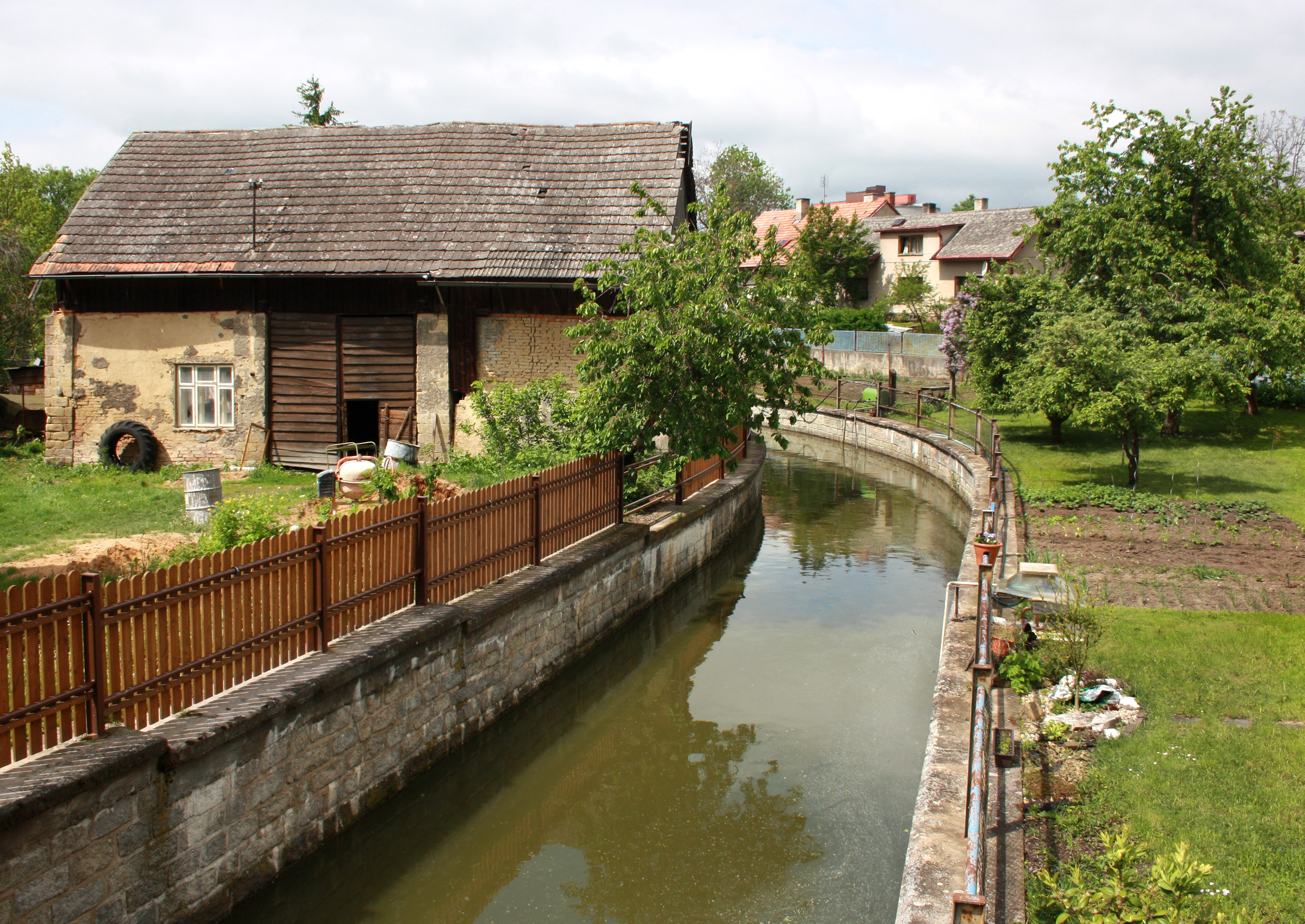
- The Mrlina in Kopidlno

Location
- Country: Czech Republic
- Regions: Hradec Králové; Central Bohemian

Physical characteristics
- Source
  - location: Markvartice, Jičín Uplands
  - coordinates: 50°26′30″N 15°13′20″E
  - elevation: 376 m (1,234 ft)
- Mouth
  - location: Elbe
  - coordinates: 50°11′10″N 15°2′56″E
  - elevation: 183 m (600 ft)
- Length: 49.6 km (30.8 mi)
- Basin size: 656.7 km^{2} (253.6 sq mi)
- Discharge
  - average: 1.62 m^{3}/s (57 cu ft/s) near estuary

Basin features
- Progression: Elbe→ North Sea

The Mrlina (Czech pronunciation: [ˈmr̩lɪna]) is a river in the Czech Republic, a right tributary of the Elbe River. It flows through the Hradec Králové and Central Bohemian regions. It is 49.6 km (30.8 mi) long.

== Etymology ==
The river was originally named Mrdlina. The name of the river is derived from the Czech words mrlý and mdlý, meaning 'slow', 'faint'.

== Characteristic ==
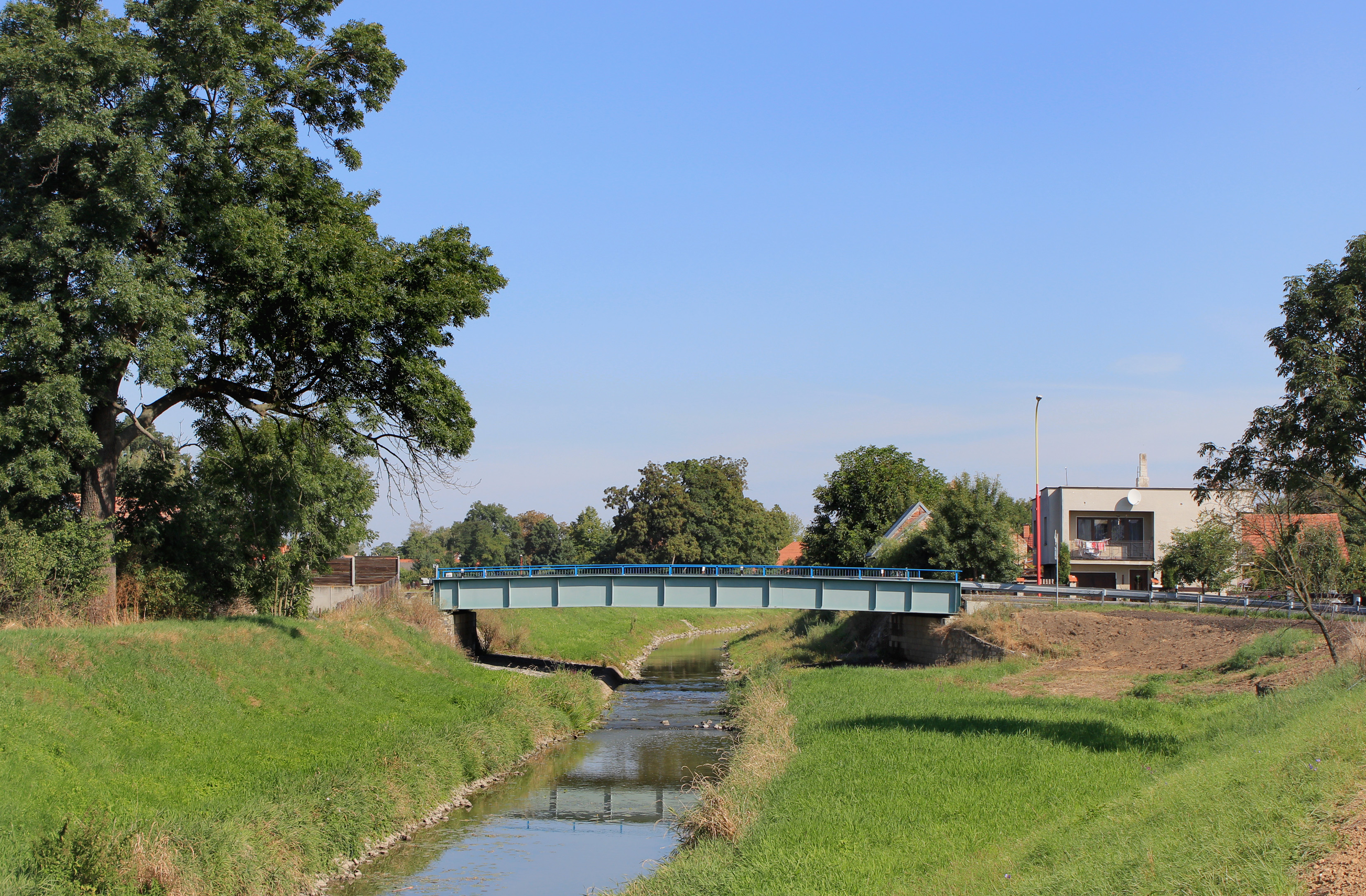
The Mrlina in Vestec

The Mrlina originates in the territory of Markvartice in the Jičín Uplands at an elevation of 376 m (1,234 ft) and flows to Nymburk, where it enters the Elbe River at an elevation of 183 m (600 ft). The river is 49.6 km (30.8 mi) long. Its drainage basin has an area of 656.7 km^{2} (253.6 sq mi).

The longest tributaries of the Mrlina are:

Tributary	Length (km)	River km	Side
Štítarský potok	27.5	15.0	left
Hasinský potok	19.7	21.5	right
Velenický potok	18.2	7.3	left
Křinecká Blatnice	15.3	7.3	right
Klobuš	10.1	2.9	right

== Course ==
The largest town on the river is Nymburk. The river flows through the municipal territories of Markvartice, Střevač, Chyjice, Jičíněves, Kopidlno, Rožďalovice, Křinec, Vestec and Budiměřice, before joining the Elbe in Nymburk.

== Bodies of water ==
There are 590 bodies of water in the basin area. The largest of them is the Zrcadlo fishpond with an area of 50 ha (120 acres). Several ponds are built on the upper course of the Mrlina.

== Tourism ==
The Mrlina is suitable for river tourism during the spring when the rains raise the river level and during the summer when the ponds are drained. About 18 km (11 mi) of the river is navigable.

== See also ==
- List of rivers of the Czech Republic
