= Záhornice =

- Municipality
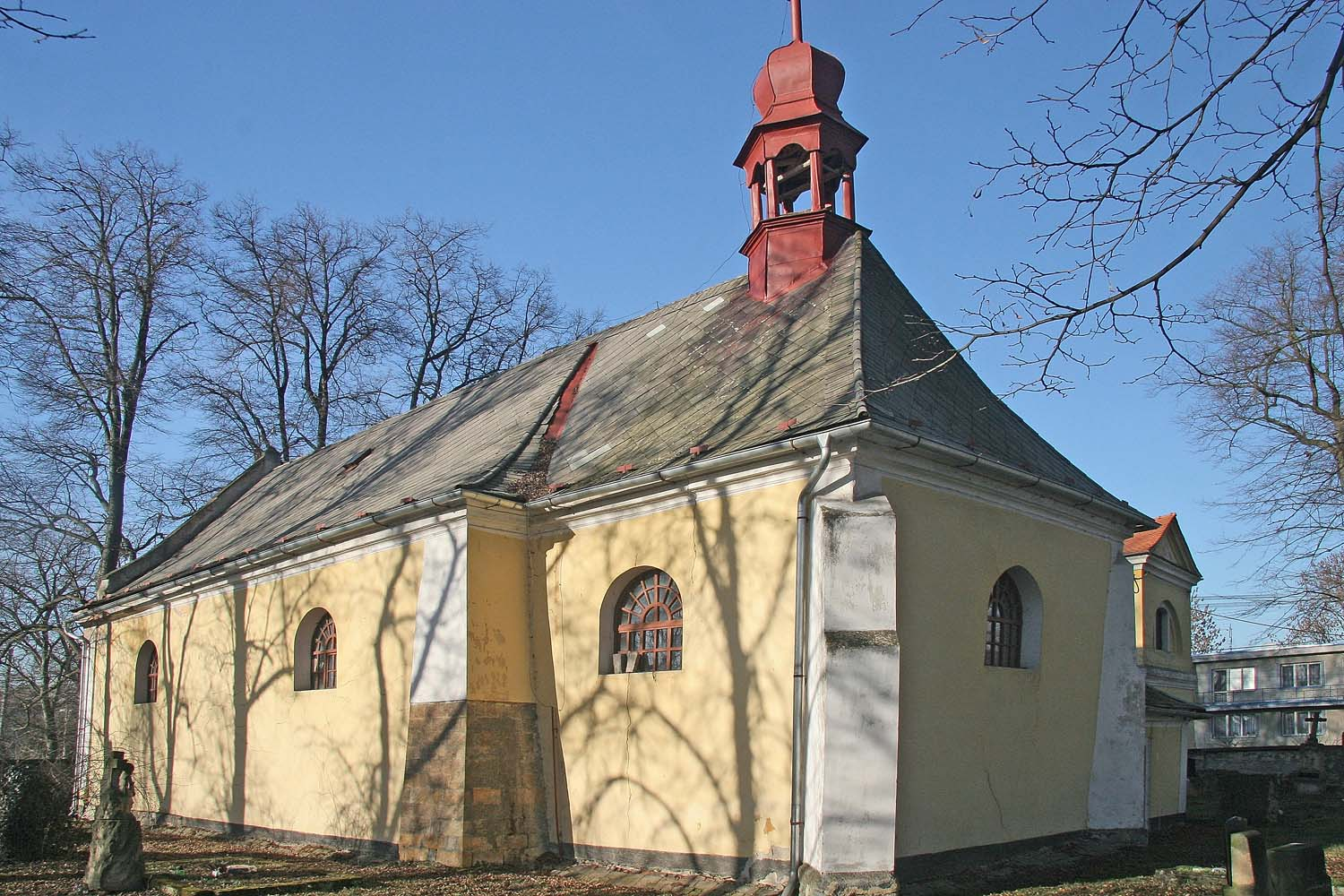
- Church of Saint Matthew

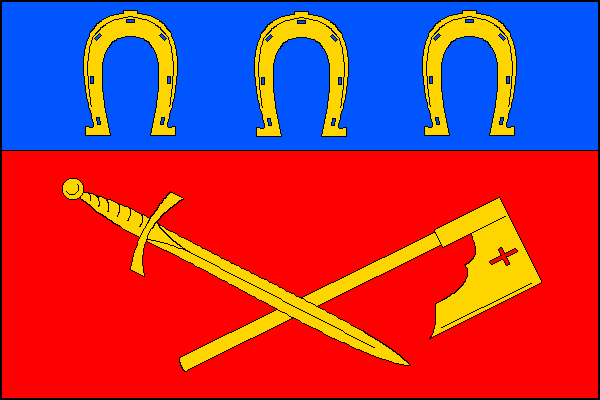
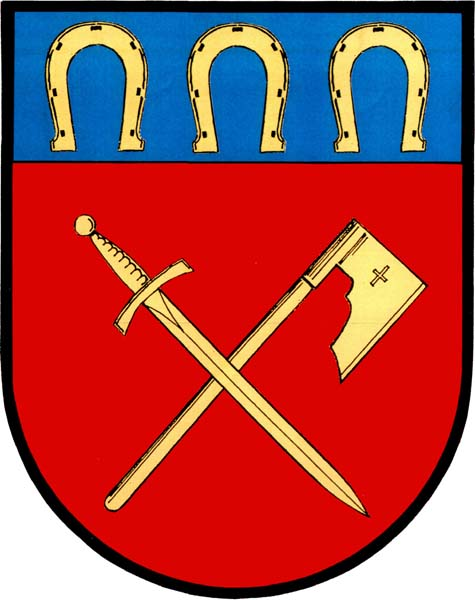
- Flag Coat of arms

- Location in the Czech Republic
- Coordinates: 50°14′52″N 15°17′28″E
- Country: Czech Republic
- Region: Central Bohemian
- District: Nymburk
- First mentioned: 1225

Area
  - Total: 17.08 km^{2} (6.59 sq mi)
- Elevation: 211 m (692 ft)

Population (2026-01-01)
  - Total: 433
  - Density: 25.4/km^{2} (65.7/sq mi)
- Time zone: UTC+1 (CET)
  - Summer (DST): UTC+2 (CEST)
- Postal code: 289 03
- Website: www.zahornice.cz

Záhornice is a municipality and village in Nymburk District in the Central Bohemian Region of the Czech Republic. It has about 400 inhabitants.

Záhornice is located about 19 kilometres (12 mi) east of Nymburk and 64 kilometres (40 mi) east of Prague.

== Administrative division ==
Záhornice consists of two municipal parts (in brackets population according to the 2021 census):

- Záhornice (390)
- Poušť (7)

== History ==
The first written mention of Záhornice is from 1225.

== Demographics ==
Historical population
| Year | Pop. | ±% |
|---|---|---|
| 1869 | 910 | — |
| 1880 | 966 | +6.2% |
| 1890 | 934 | −3.3% |
| 1900 | 926 | −0.9% |
| 1910 | 931 | +0.5% |
| 1921 | 955 | +2.6% |
| 1930 | 852 | −10.8% |
| 1950 | 602 | −29.3% |
| 1961 | 508 | −15.6% |
| 1970 | 443 | −12.8% |
| 1980 | 399 | −9.9% |
| 1991 | 355 | −11.0% |
| 2001 | 337 | −5.1% |
| 2011 | 421 | +24.9% |
| 2021 | 397 | −5.7% |
Source: Censuses

== Notable people ==
- František Pecháček (1896–1944), gymnast
