= Budiměřice =

- Municipality
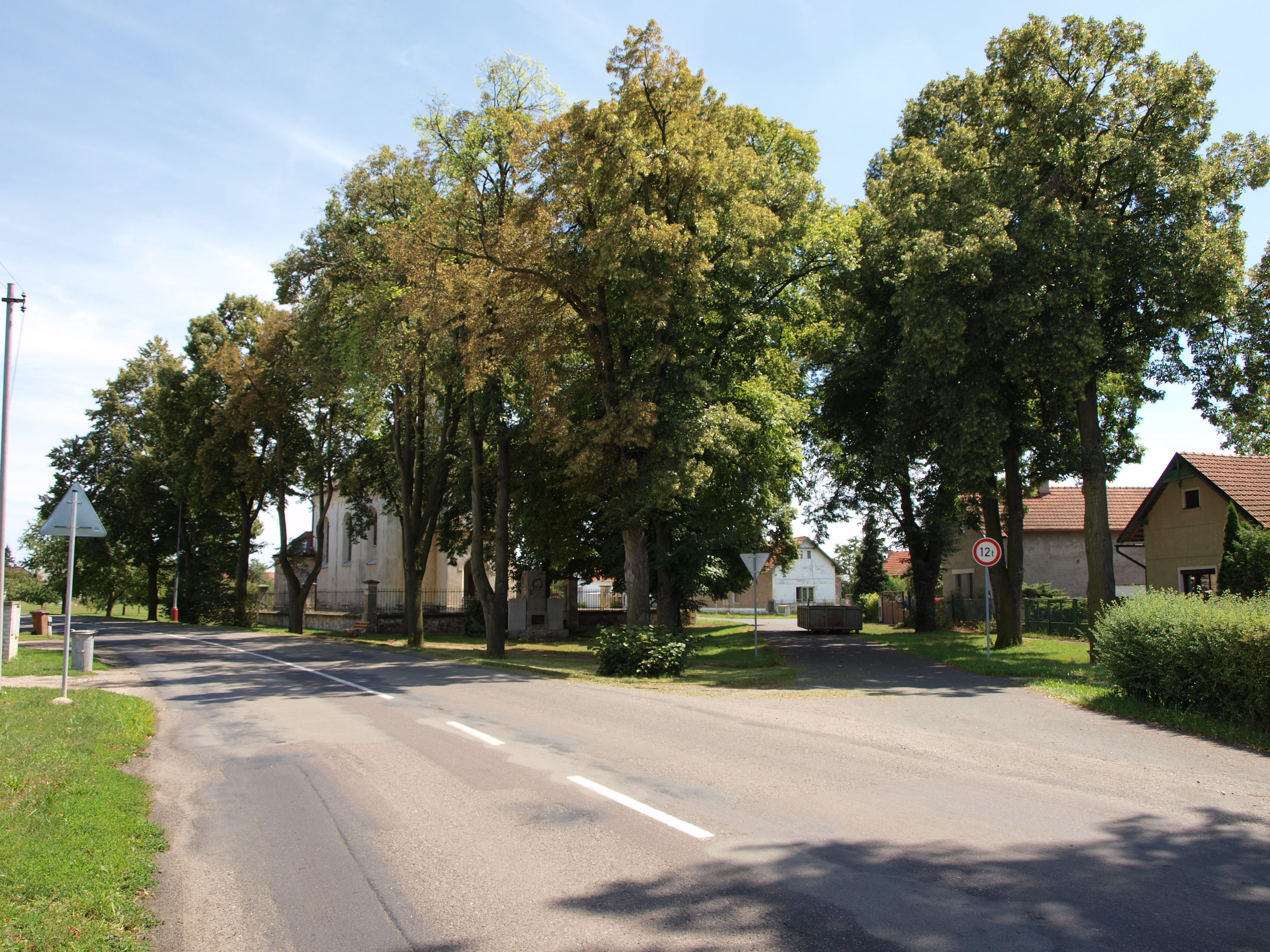
- Centre with the Church of Saint Procopius

- Location in the Czech Republic
- Coordinates: 50°11′43″N 15°5′56″E
- Country: Czech Republic
- Region: Central Bohemian
- District: Nymburk
- First mentioned: 1374

Area
  - Total: 8.02 km^{2} (3.10 sq mi)
- Elevation: 187 m (614 ft)

Population (2026-01-01)
  - Total: 652
  - Density: 81.3/km^{2} (211/sq mi)
- Time zone: UTC+1 (CET)
  - Summer (DST): UTC+2 (CEST)
- Postal code: 288 02
- Website: budimerice.cz

Budiměřice is a municipality and village in Nymburk District in the Central Bohemian Region of the Czech Republic. It has about 700 inhabitants.

== Administrative division ==
Budiměřice consists of three municipal parts (in brackets population according to the 2021 census):

- Budiměřice (355)
- Rašovice (159)
- Šlotava (114)

== Etymology ==
The name is derived from the personal name Budimír or Budiměr, meaning "the village of Budimír's/Budiměr's people".

== Geography ==
Budiměřice is located about 4 kilometres (2 mi) east of Nymburk and 42 km (26 mi) east of Prague. It lies in a flat agricultural landscape in the Central Elbe Table. The Mrlina River flows through the municipality.

== History ==
The first written mention of Budiměřice is from 1374.

== Demographics ==
Historical population

Year	Pop.	±%
1869	572	—
1880	667	+16.6%
1890	786	+17.8%
1900	868	+10.4%
1910	978	+12.7%

Year	Pop.	±%
1921	961	−1.7%
1930	913	−5.0%
1950	687	−24.8%
1961	663	−3.5%
1970	654	−1.4%

Year	Pop.	±%
1980	621	−5.0%
1991	536	−13.7%
2001	558	+4.1%
2011	600	+7.5%
2021	628	+4.7%

Source: Censuses

== Transport ==
There are no railways or major roads passing through the municipality.

== Sights ==
The main landmark of Budiměřice is the Church of Saint Procopius. The oldest church was built in the Gothic style in the 14th century, but it was destroyed by a fire in 1803. The current church was built in the neo-Gothic style in 1879–1881.
