= Křinec =

- Market town
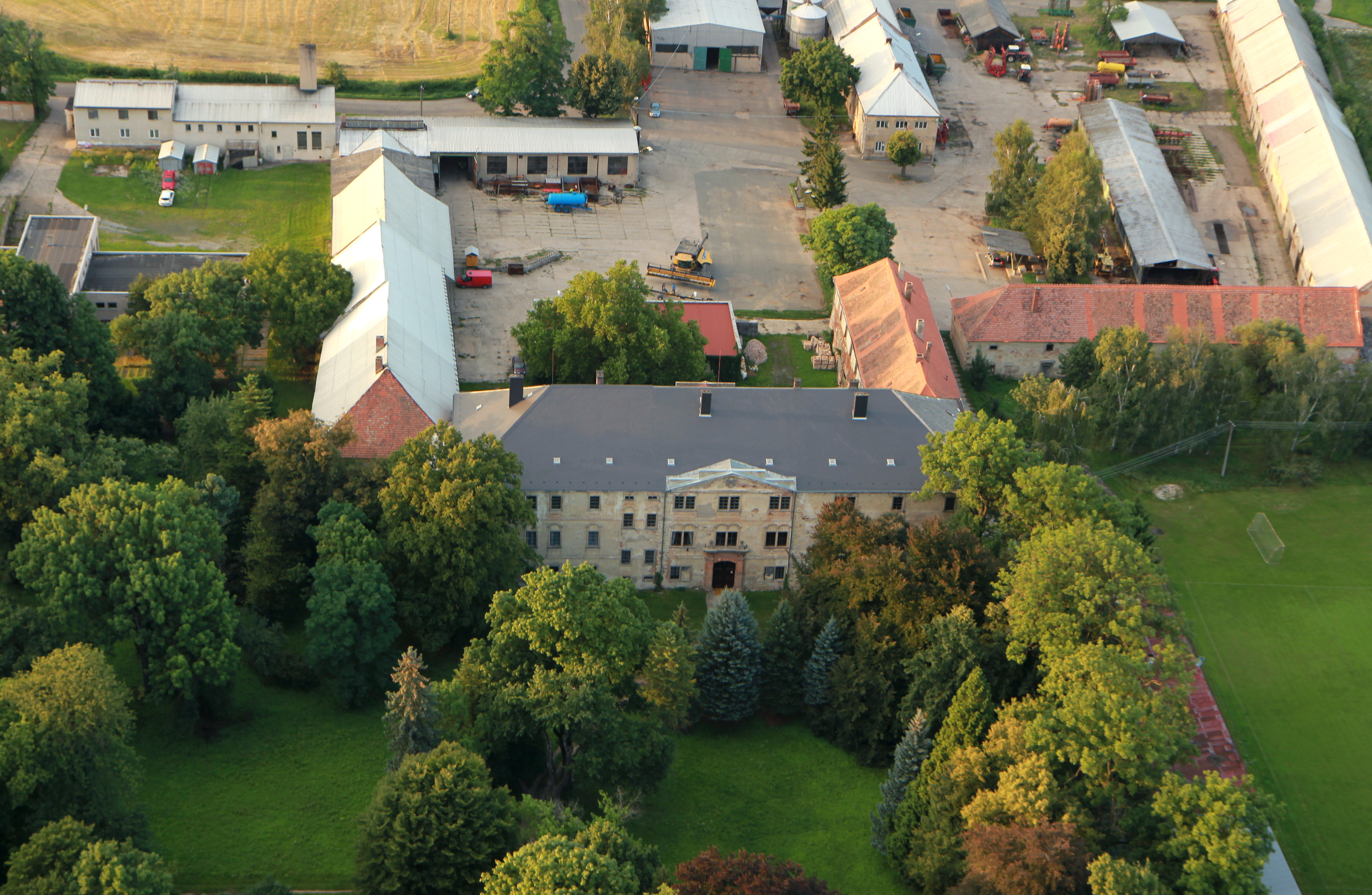
- Křinec Castle

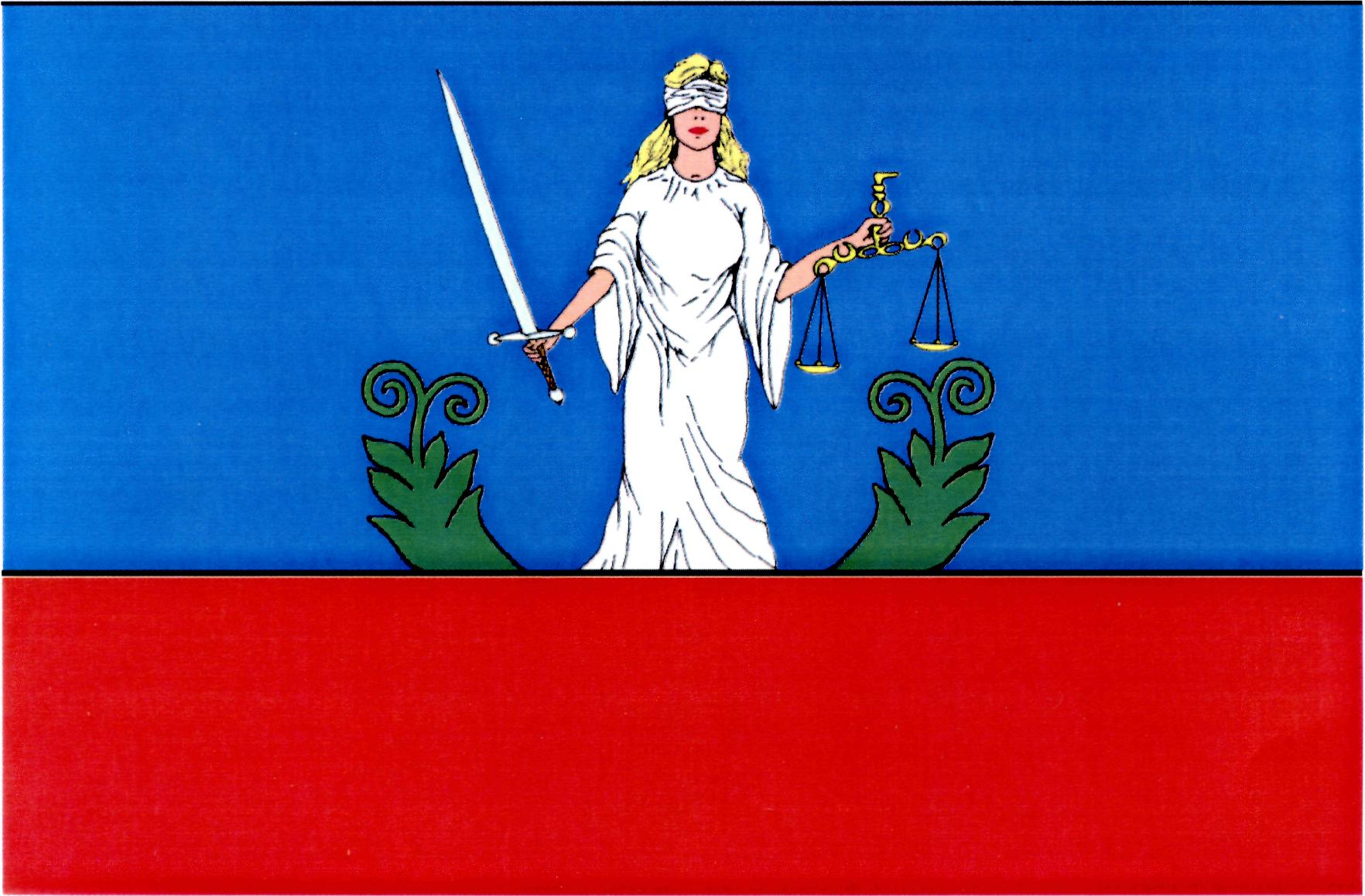
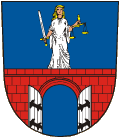
- Flag Coat of arms

- Location in the Czech Republic
- Coordinates: 50°15′38″N 15°8′6″E
- Country: Czech Republic
- Region: Central Bohemian
- District: Nymburk
- First mentioned: 1352

Area
  - Total: 25.84 km^{2} (9.98 sq mi)
- Elevation: 192 m (630 ft)

Population (2026-01-01)
  - Total: 1,391
  - Density: 53.83/km^{2} (139.4/sq mi)
- Time zone: UTC+1 (CET)
  - Summer (DST): UTC+2 (CEST)
- Postal code: 289 33
- Website: www.krinec.cz

Křinec (Czech pronunciation: [ˈkr̝̊ɪnɛts]) is a market town in Nymburk District in the Central Bohemian Region of the Czech Republic. It has about 1,400 inhabitants.

== Administrative division ==
Křinec consists of six municipal parts (in brackets population according to the 2021 census):

- Křinec (925)
- Bošín (53)
- Mečíř (86)
- Nové Zámky (37)
- Sovenice (77)
- Zábrdovice (121)

== Etymology ==
The initial name of the settlement was Křinice. It was derived from the Slavic word krinica, meaning 'spring', 'well'.

== Geography ==
Křinec is located about 11 kilometres (7 mi) northeast of Nymburk and 46 km (29 mi) northeast of Prague. It lies in a flat landscape in the Central Elbe Table. The highest point is the hill Chotuc at 254 m (833 ft) above sea level. The market town is situated on the right bank of the Mrlina River.

== History ==
The first written mention of Křinec is from 1352. After the Hussite Wars, the village was acquired by a noble family, since then known as the Křinecký of Ronov family. They had built the Kuncberk Castle on the eponymous hill above the village. They sold the Kuncberk estate to the Kostomlatský of Vřesovice family in 1565. Křinec was first referred to as a market town in 1568.

After the Battle of White Mountain in 1620, Křinec was acquired by Albrecht von Wallenstein, who soon gave it to another members of the Waldstein family. In 1649, Křinec was purchased by the Morzin family. They had completely rebuilt the market town, badly damaged during the Thirty Years' War. They owned Křinec until 1796.

== Demographics ==
Historical population

Year	Pop.	±%
1869	2,320	—
1880	2,674	+15.3%
1890	2,647	−1.0%
1900	2,431	−8.2%
1910	2,467	+1.5%

Year	Pop.	±%
1921	2,431	−1.5%
1930	2,222	−8.6%
1950	1,797	−19.1%
1961	1,825	+1.6%
1970	1,657	−9.2%

Year	Pop.	±%
1980	1,614	−2.6%
1991	1,394	−13.6%
2001	1,364	−2.2%
2011	1,320	−3.2%
2021	1,299	−1.6%

Source: Censuses

== Transport ==
Křinec is located on the railway line Prague–Turnov.

== Sights ==
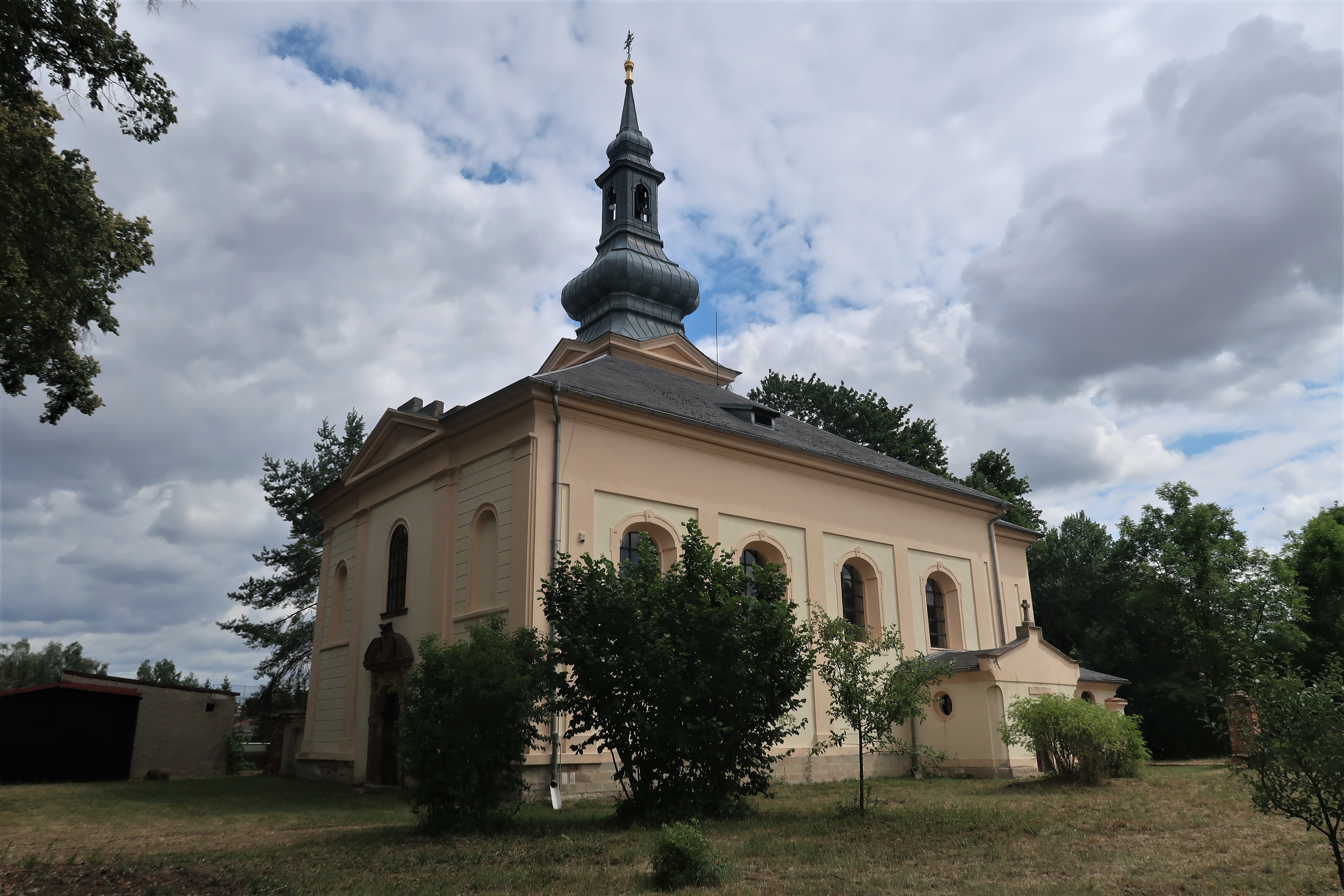
Church of Saint Giles

The Křinec Castle is an early Baroque castle, one of the two main landmarks of Křinice. The main building was built in 1649 and the wings in 1659–1660. The castle was probably designed by Carlo Lurago. A park is adjacent to the castle. Today it serves cultural and social purposes, and offers sightseeing tours.

Opposite the castle stands the Church of Saint Giles. It is a Baroque church from the 17th century.

Kuncberk Castle has not survived. After the castle disappeared, a Baroque manor house was built in its place, but it has not been preserved too and only the cellars are visible in its place.
