= Vestec (Nymburk District) =

- Municipality
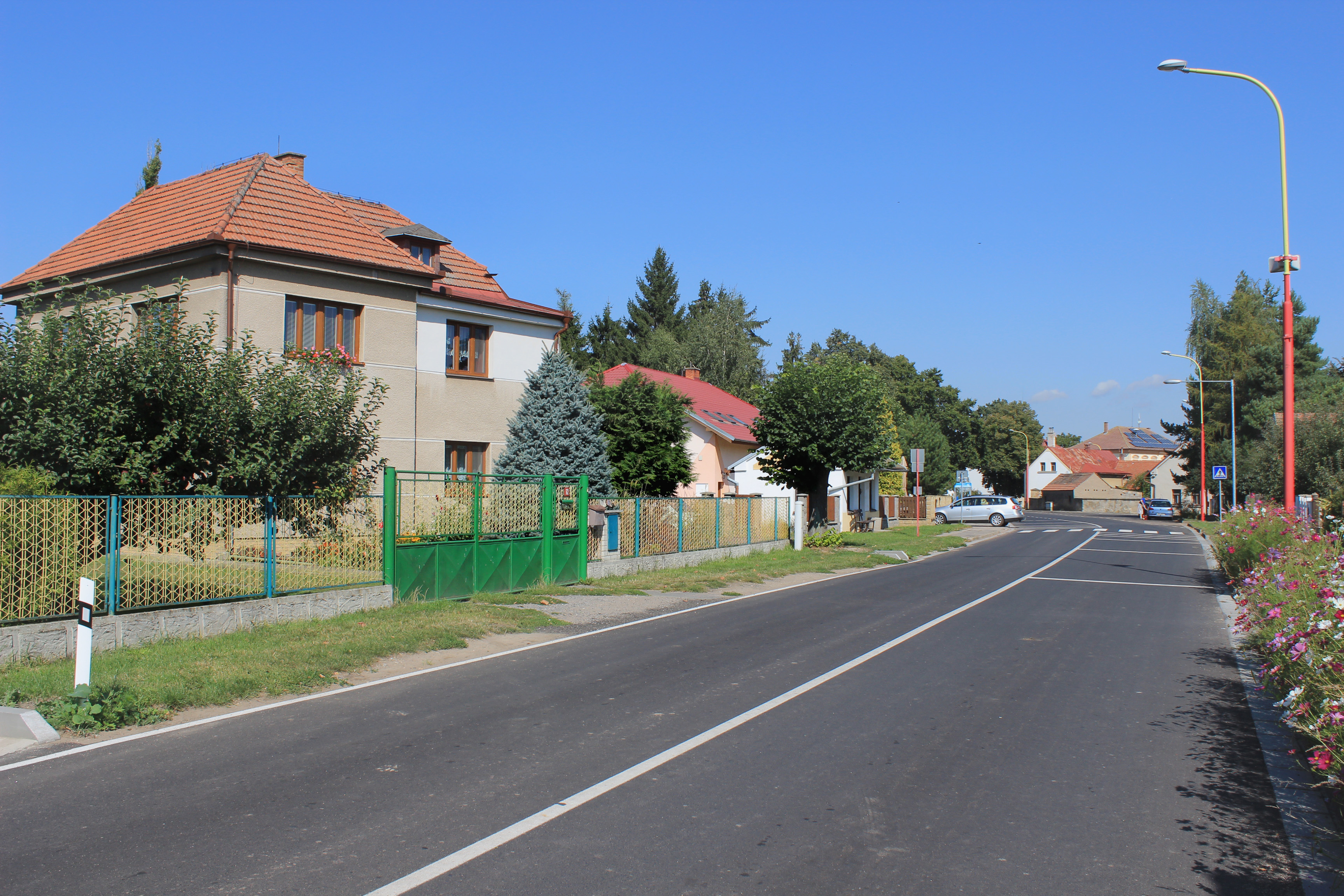
- Main road

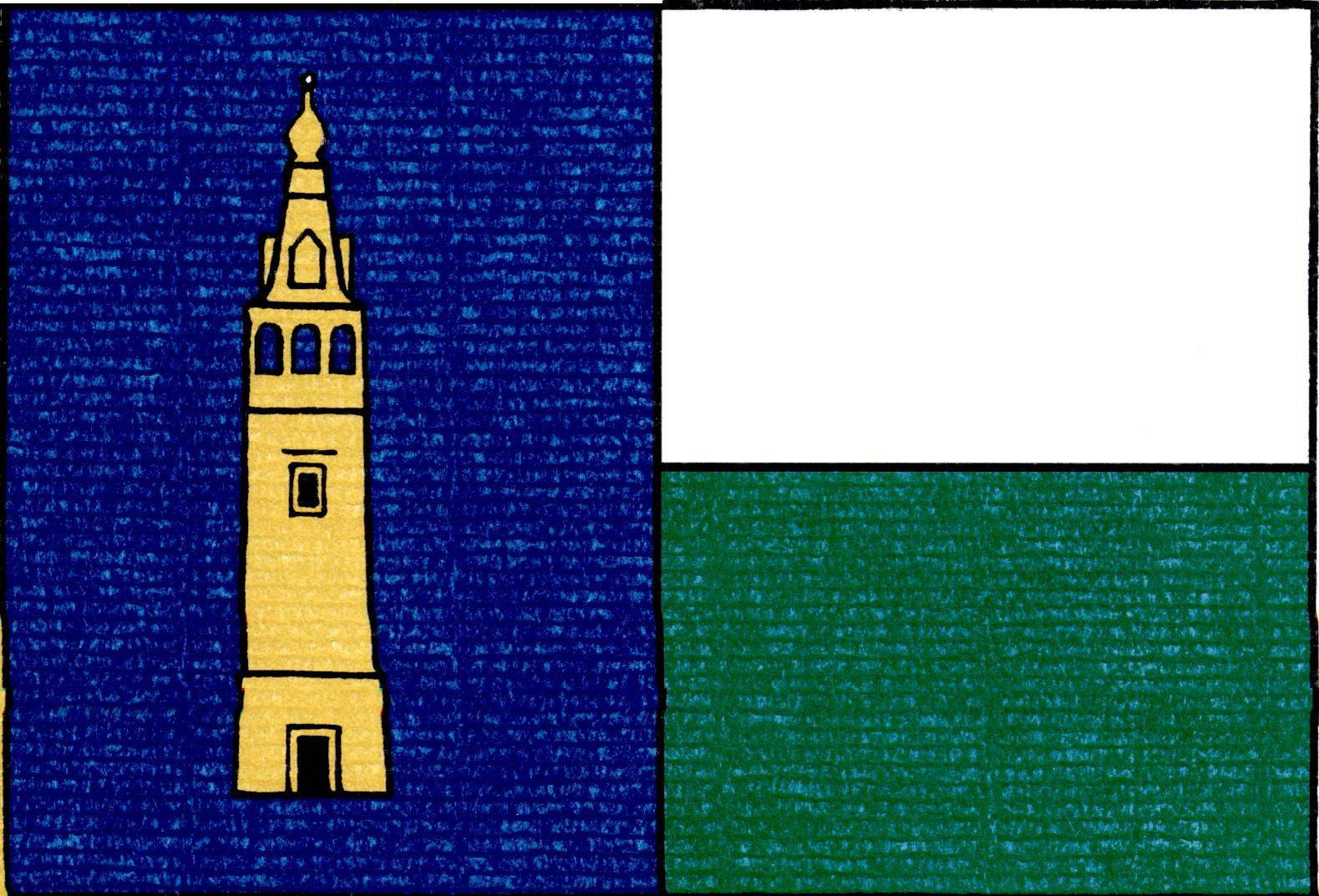
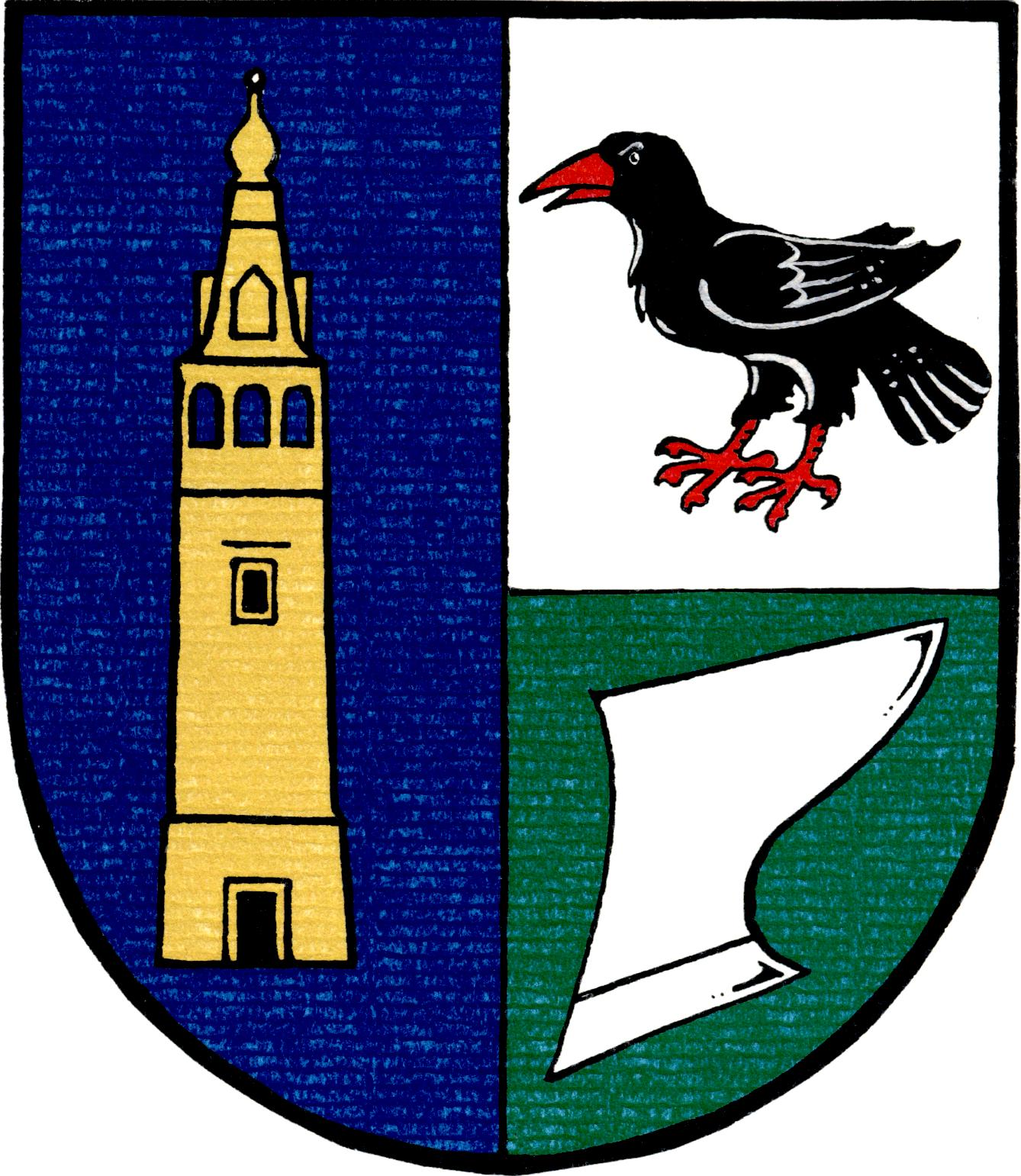
- Flag Coat of arms

- Location in the Czech Republic
- Coordinates: 50°14′23″N 15°8′46″E
- Country: Czech Republic
- Region: Central Bohemian
- District: Nymburk
- First mentioned: 1383

Area
  - Total: 7.44 km^{2} (2.87 sq mi)
- Elevation: 190 m (620 ft)

Population (2026-01-01)
  - Total: 359
  - Density: 48.3/km^{2} (125/sq mi)
- Time zone: UTC+1 (CET)
  - Summer (DST): UTC+2 (CEST)
- Postal code: 289 33
- Website: www.obecvestec.cz

Vestec is a municipality and village in Nymburk District in the Central Bohemian Region of the Czech Republic. It has about 400 inhabitants.

== Geography ==
Vestec is located about 9 kilometres (6 mi) northeast of Nymburk and 46 km (29 mi) northeast of Prague. It lies in a flat agricultural landscape in the Central Elbe Table. The Mrlina River flows through the municipality.

== Demographics ==
Historical population
Year	Pop.	±%
1869	440	—
1880	531	+20.7%
1890	601	+13.2%
1900	571	−5.0%
1910	606	+6.1%
1921	552	−8.9%
1930	572	+3.6%
1950	396	−30.8%
1961	433	+9.3%
1970	386	−10.9%
1980	343	−11.1%
1991	314	−8.5%
2001	310	−1.3%
2011	300	−3.2%
2021	320	+6.7%
Source: Censuses
