= Václav Šimon =

Czech urologist and academic (1926–2026)

- Born: Václav Daniel Šimon; 29 May 1926; Prague, Czechoslovakia (Note: Sometimes Kolín or Nymburk is mistakenly given as the place of birth.)
- Died: 25 July 2026 (aged 100)
- Education: Charles University
- Occupations: Urologist, academic, medical researcher
- Spouse: Jitka Hlaváčková

Václav Daniel Šimon (29 May 1926 – 25 July 2026) was a Czech urologist, academic and medical researcher.

== Early life and career ==
Václav Šimon was born in Prague, Czechoslovakia on 29 May 1926. His father was a rural doctor. Both he and his brother studied medicine. During his medical studies, he first worked in Hradec Králové as a demonstrator at the Institute of Anatomy. He created casts of the cerebral ventricles and casts of the bronchial system as models for segmental lung resections.

He graduated in Prague in 1952. After graduation, he worked in the gynecological and obstetrics department of the district hospital in Nymburk, where he obtained a certificate as a gynecologist-obstetrician, and from 1956, he worked in the surgical department of the regional hospital in Kolín. He first obtained a certificate in the field of surgery, after that, he obtained a certificate in urology. He also began to perform radical cystectomies with intestinal replacement and developed transurethral surgery.

In 1968, he moved to Prague to the second Surgical Clinic. The contacts of this workplace also made it possible to travel to the capitalist world and do internships at leading European workplaces. In 1975, he became one of the first members for the European Urological Association.

After the reorganization of the departments of the General University Hospital, he left in 1996 to the urology clinic, where he worked until his retirement in 1999.

== Personal life and death ==
Šimon was married to Jitka Hlaváčková, a doctor.

Šimon died on 25 July 2026, at the age of 100.
