= Vratislav Effenberger =

Czech literature theoretician (1923–1986)

- Born: 22 April 1923; Nymburk, Czechoslovakia
- Died: 10 August 1986 (aged 63); Prague, Czechoslovakia
- Occupations: Surrealist, writer, essayist
- Writing career
- Period: 20th century
- Genre: Writing
- Literary movement: Surrealism

Vratislav Effenberger (22 April 1923 – 10 August 1986) was a Czech literature theoretician. He has German Bohemian descent from his paternal side, but has assimilated into Czech.

== Life and career ==
Vratislav Effenberger was born on 22 April 1923 in Nymburk. In 1944, Effenberger left industrial school with his Abitur. He went to study chemistry and the history of art as well as aesthetics at the philosophical faculty. Starting from 1946, he joined the Czechoslovak Film Institute, from which he was dismissed 1954. He was then a worker until 1966 and later was appointed to the Czech Academy of Sciences. In 1970, he was dismissed for political reasons and had to take a job as a nightwatchman. In 1969, he became editor of the surrealist magazine Analogon; which around 1968 it published newspapers and magazines, which were concerned with literature, theatre or art.

== Works ==
He became famous with a collection of film scripts and pseudo-scripts Surovost života a cynismus fantasie.

Most of his works were self-published in a handwritten form. He also published numerous articles in newspapers and magazines. Some of his works were seized and destroyed by the Czech State Security.

=== Books ===
- Henri Rousseau, Státní nakladatelství krásné literatury a umění (SNKLU) Prague 1963, monographie
- Reality and poetry (Realita a poezie), 1969
- Formative expressions Surrealismus (Výtvarné projevy surrealismu), Odeon Prague 1969
- Development of thearalischer styles (Vývoj divadelních slohů), 1972 self publishing house
- Rawness of the Life and the Cynicism of the Fantasy (Surovost života a cynismus fantasie), Sixty-Eight Publishers Toronto 1984, Orbis Prague 1991
- Hunt for the black shark (Lov na černého žraloka), PmD-Publ. 1987 Munich, poems
- Poems I, (Básně I), Torst Prague 2004 ISBN 80-7215-232-7
- Hunt for the black shark (Polowanie na czarnego rekina), Atut 2006 Wrocław, ISBN 978-83-7432-196-9
- Poems II, (Básně II), Torst Prague 2007 ISBN 978-80-7215-330-5
- Republic and testicles, (Republiku a varlata), Torst Prague 2012 ISBN 978-80-7215-446-3

=== Manuscripts ===
- Surrealistic poetry (Surrealistická poezie) (1969)
- Models and methods (Modely a metody) (1969)
- Treasure of seeing (Poklad vidění) - a study from the history of the modern forming art. (1970)
- Karel of pastes (1970)
- Karel Havlíček (1971) Monographie
- Picture and word (Obraz A slovo) (1971)
- Osvobozené divadlo (1972–73)
- Karol Baron (1977) Monographie
- The Trumbild and imagination (Vidění a imaginace) (1977)

== Films ==
- 2018 Vratislav Effenberger aneb Lov na černého žraloka (Vratislav Effenberger, or Hunting on a Black Shark), document, 85 min. Directed David Jařab (CS)
