= Chyjice =

- Municipality
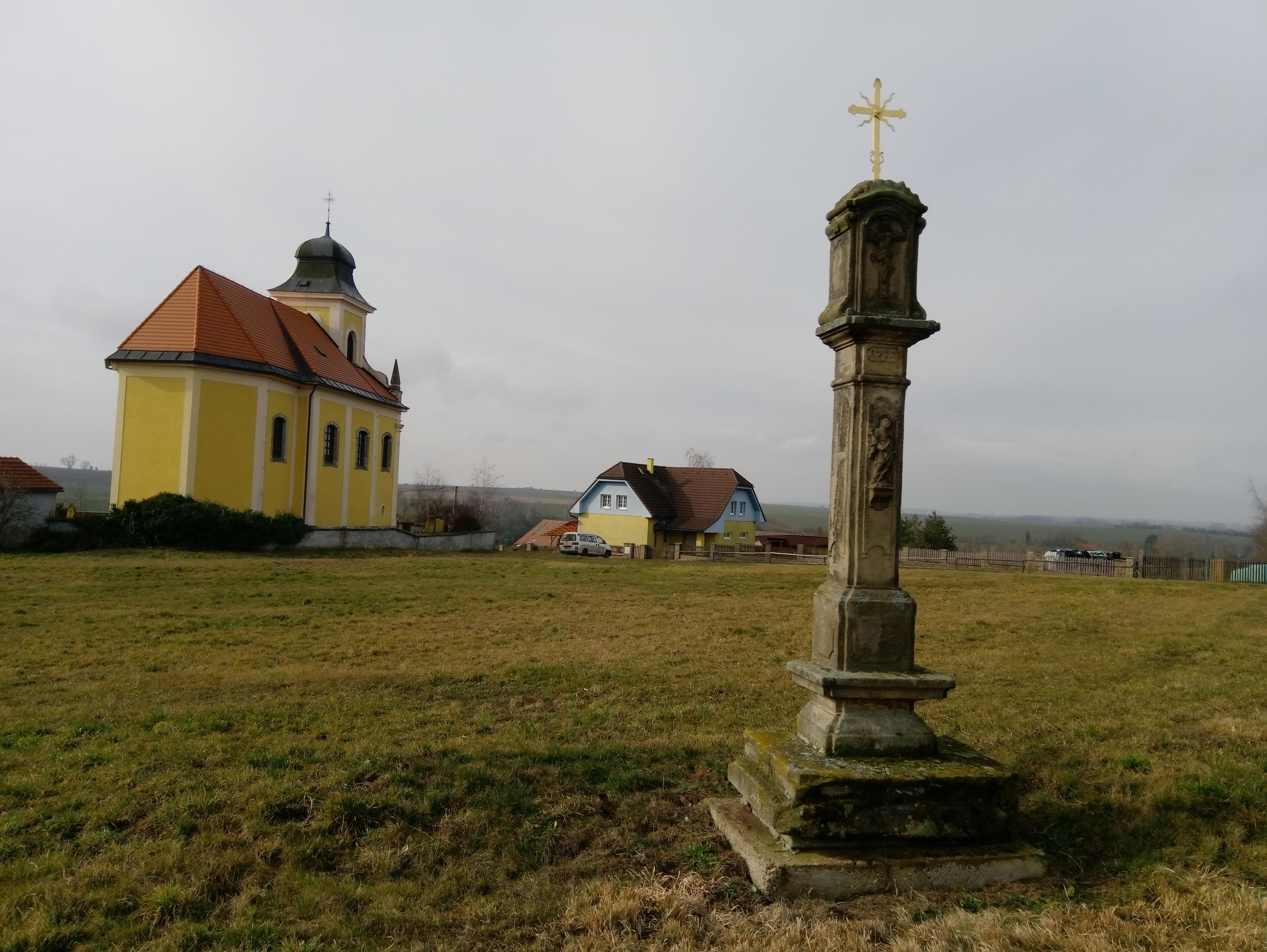
- Church of Saints Simon and Jude

- Flag Coat of arms

- Location in the Czech Republic
- Coordinates: 50°23′16″N 15°17′44″E
- Country: Czech Republic
- Region: Hradec Králové
- District: Jičín
- First mentioned: 1323

Area
  - Total: 5.10 km^{2} (1.97 sq mi)
- Elevation: 273 m (896 ft)

Population (2026-01-01)
  - Total: 184
  - Density: 36.1/km^{2} (93.4/sq mi)
- Time zone: UTC+1 (CET)
  - Summer (DST): UTC+2 (CEST)
- Postal code: 506 01
- Website: www.chyjice.cz

Chyjice is a municipality and village in Jičín District in the Hradec Králové Region of the Czech Republic. It has about 200 inhabitants.

== Demographics ==
Historical population
Year	Pop.	±%
1869	600	—
1880	602	+0.3%
1890	603	+0.2%
1900	546	−9.5%
1910	529	−3.1%
1921	453	−14.4%
1930	416	−8.2%
1950	303	−27.2%
1961	257	−15.2%
1970	205	−20.2%
1980	157	−23.4%
1991	143	−8.9%
2001	126	−11.9%
2011	152	+20.6%
2021	172	+13.2%
Source: Censuses
