= Markvartice (Jihlava District) =

- Municipality
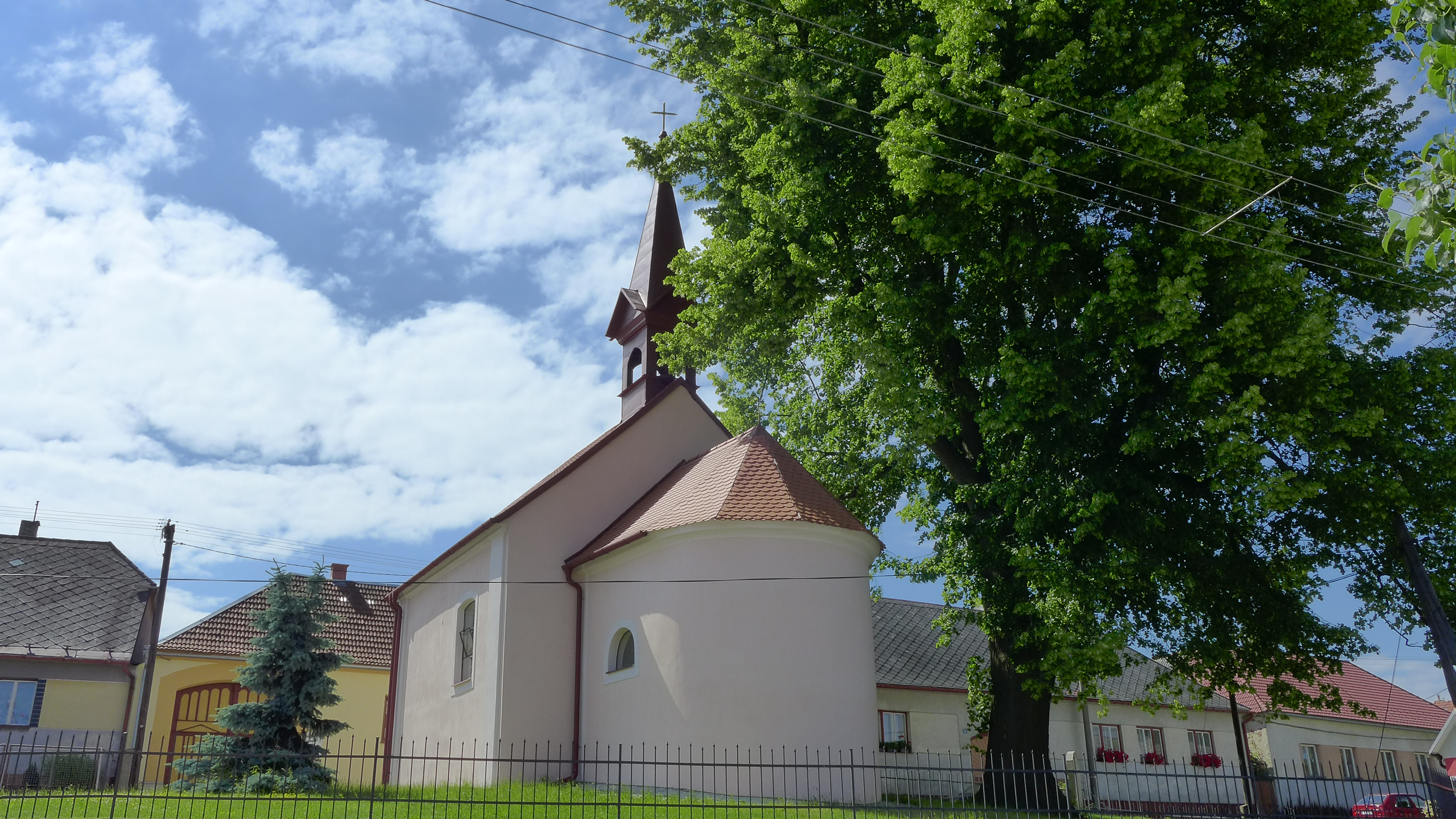
- Chapel of the Virgin Mary

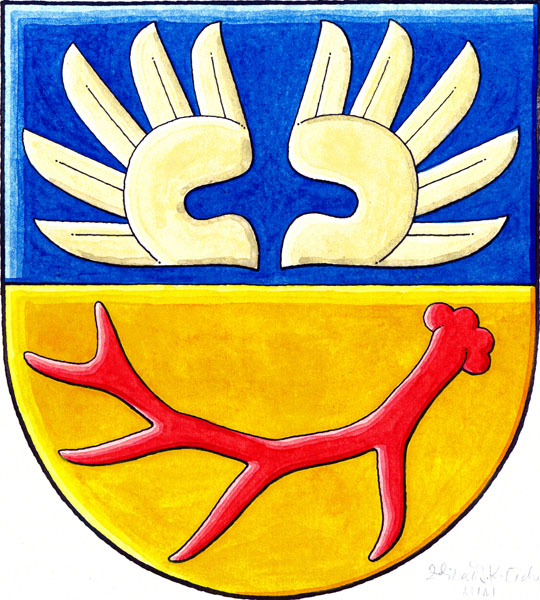
- Coat of arms

- Location in the Czech Republic
- Coordinates: 49°10′42″N 15°37′2″E
- Country: Czech Republic
- Region: Vysočina
- District: Jihlava
- First mentioned: 1257

Area
  - Total: 6.41 km^{2} (2.47 sq mi)
- Elevation: 621 m (2,037 ft)

Population (2026-01-01)
  - Total: 195
  - Density: 30.4/km^{2} (78.8/sq mi)
- Time zone: UTC+1 (CET)
  - Summer (DST): UTC+2 (CEST)
- Postal code: 588 56
- Website: www.obecmarkvartice.cz

Markvartice (Czech pronunciation: [ˈmarkvarcɪtsɛ]) is a municipality and village in Jihlava District in the Vysočina Region of the Czech Republic. It has about 200 inhabitants.

Markvartice lies approximately 24 kilometres (15 mi) south of Jihlava and 133 km (83 mi) south-east of Prague.

== Demographics ==
Historical population
Year	Pop.	±%
1869	467	—
1880	402	−13.9%
1890	411	+2.2%
1900	398	−3.2%
1910	378	−5.0%
1921	387	+2.4%
1930	383	−1.0%
1950	281	−26.6%
1961	316	+12.5%
1970	283	−10.4%
1980	249	−12.0%
1991	235	−5.6%
2001	210	−10.6%
2011	215	+2.4%
2021	180	−16.3%
Source: Censuses
