= Střevač =

- Municipality
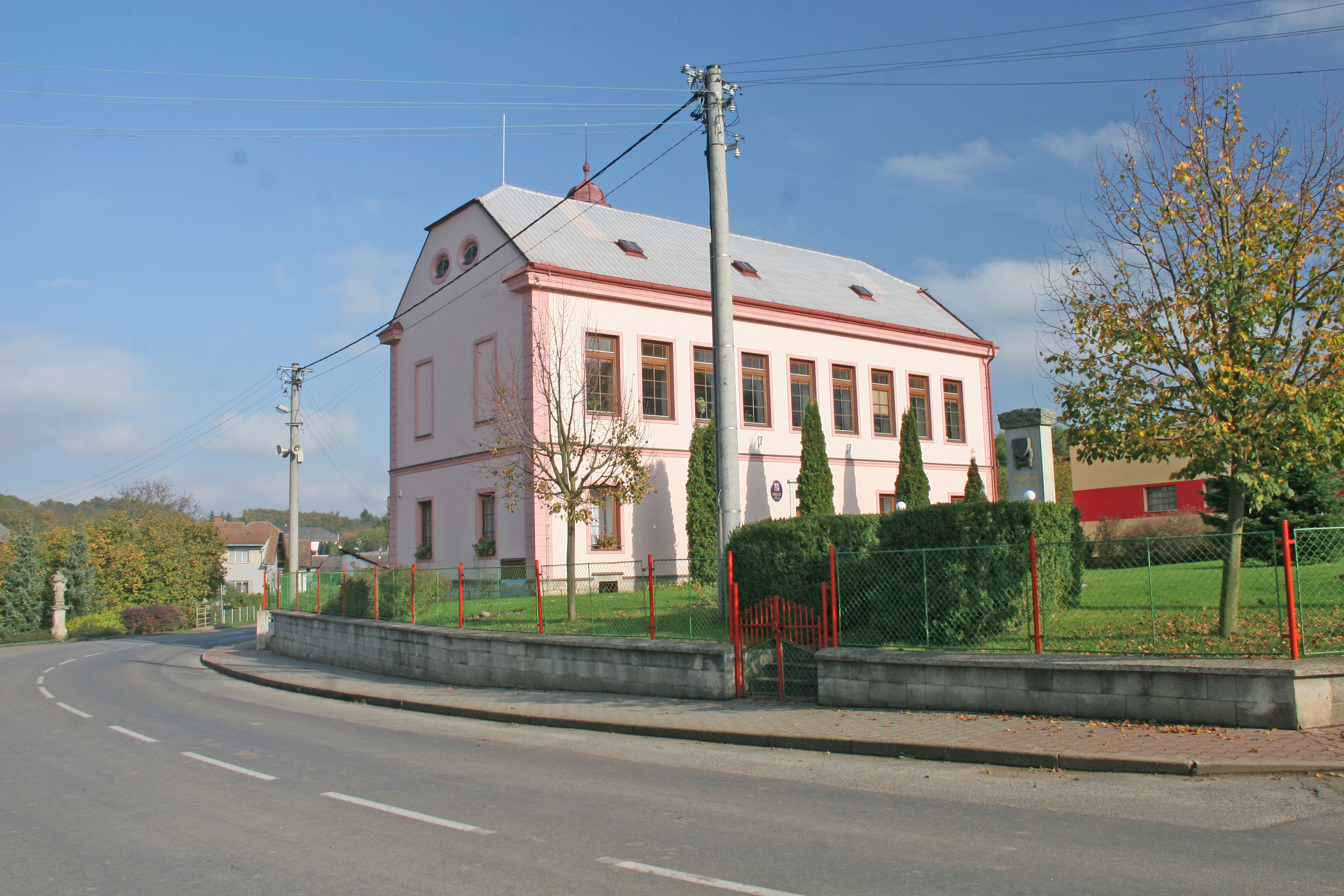
- Municipal office

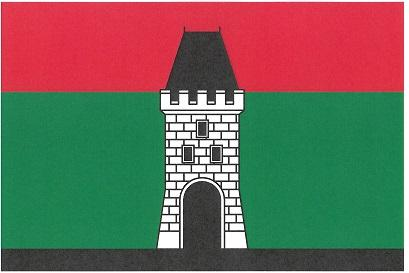
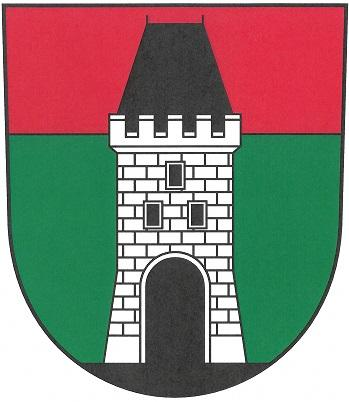
- Flag Coat of arms

- Location in the Czech Republic
- Coordinates: 50°24′16″N 15°16′28″E
- Country: Czech Republic
- Region: Hradec Králové
- District: Jičín
- First mentioned: 1340

Area
  - Total: 11.24 km^{2} (4.34 sq mi)
- Elevation: 288 m (945 ft)

Population (2026-01-01)
  - Total: 286
  - Density: 25.4/km^{2} (65.9/sq mi)
- Time zone: UTC+1 (CET)
  - Summer (DST): UTC+2 (CEST)
- Postal codes: 506 01, 507 22
- Website: www.strevac.cz

Střevač is a municipality and village in Jičín District in the Hradec Králové Region of the Czech Republic. It has about 300 inhabitants.

== Administrative division ==
Střevač consists of four municipal parts (in brackets population according to the 2021 census):

- Střevač (163)
- Batín (58)
- Nadslav (67)
- Štidla (26)

== Demographics ==
Historical population
Year	Pop.	±%
1869	946	—
1880	908	−4.0%
1890	947	+4.3%
1900	867	−8.4%
1910	835	−3.7%
1921	778	−6.8%
1930	721	−7.3%
1950	540	−25.1%
1961	498	−7.8%
1970	407	−18.3%
1980	309	−24.1%
1991	279	−9.7%
2001	287	+2.9%
2011	281	−2.1%
2021	314	+11.7%
Source: Censuses
