= Markvartice (Třebíč District) =

- Municipality
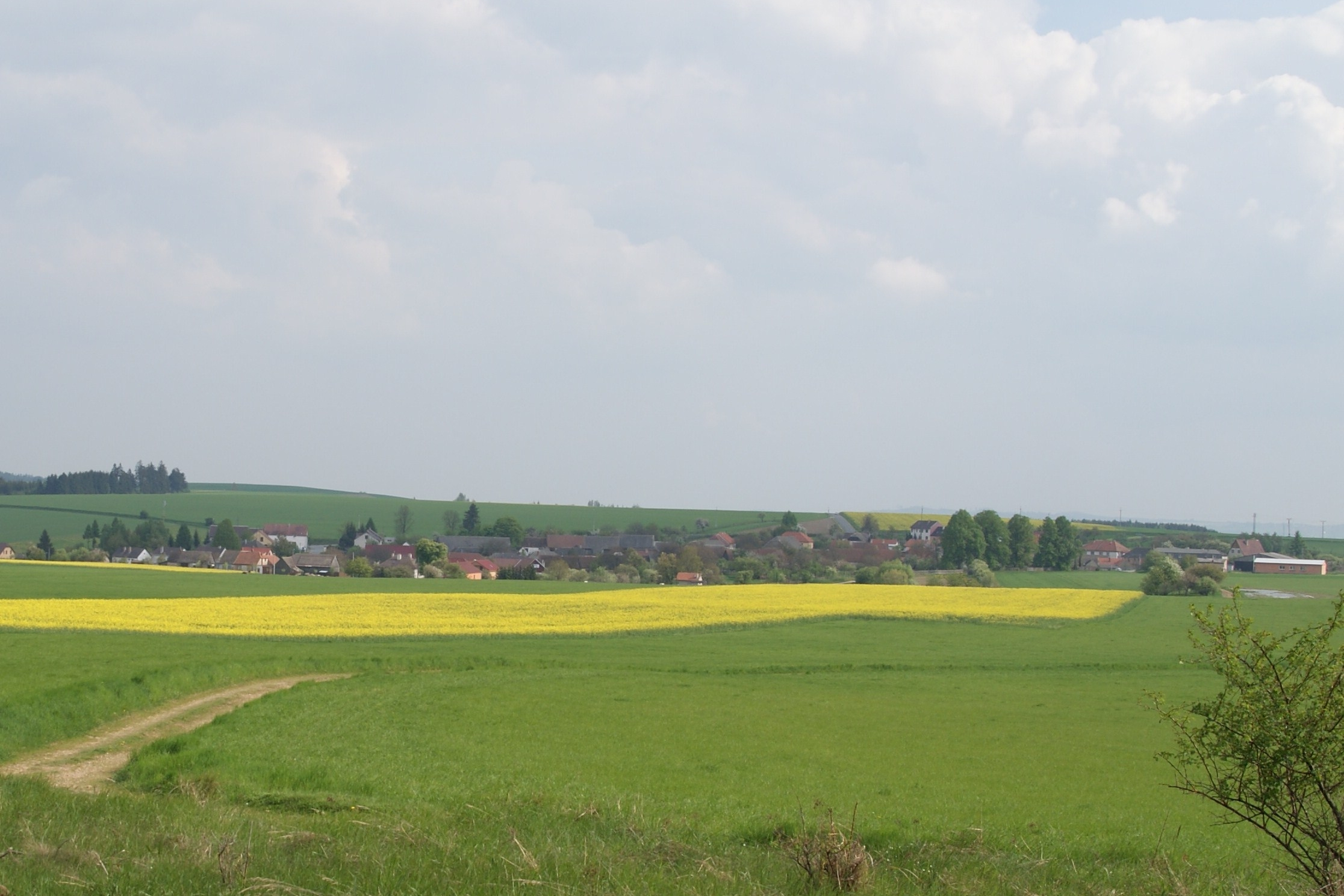
- View from the north

- Flag Coat of arms

- Location in the Czech Republic
- Coordinates: 49°12′3″N 15°46′2″E
- Country: Czech Republic
- Region: Vysočina
- District: Třebíč
- First mentioned: 1371

Area
  - Total: 3.20 km^{2} (1.24 sq mi)
- Elevation: 550 m (1,800 ft)

Population (2026-01-01)
  - Total: 283
  - Density: 88.4/km^{2} (229/sq mi)
- Time zone: UTC+1 (CET)
  - Summer (DST): UTC+2 (CEST)
- Postal code: 675 22
- Website: www.obec-markvartice.cz

Markvartice is a municipality and village in Třebíč District in the Vysočina Region of the Czech Republic. It has about 300 inhabitants.

Markvartice lies approximately 9 kilometres (6 mi) west of Třebíč, 25 km (16 mi) south-east of Jihlava, and 138 km (86 mi) south-east of Prague.

== History ==
The first written mention of Markvartice is from 1371.

== Demographics ==
Historical population
Year	Pop.	±%
1869	165	—
1880	191	+15.8%
1890	203	+6.3%
1900	204	+0.5%
1910	230	+12.7%
1921	271	+17.8%
1930	262	−3.3%
1950	244	−6.9%
1961	262	+7.4%
1970	281	+7.3%
1980	264	−6.0%
1991	237	−10.2%
2001	239	+0.8%
2011	254	+6.3%
2021	278	+9.4%
Source: Censuses
