= Markvartice (Jičín District) =

- Municipality
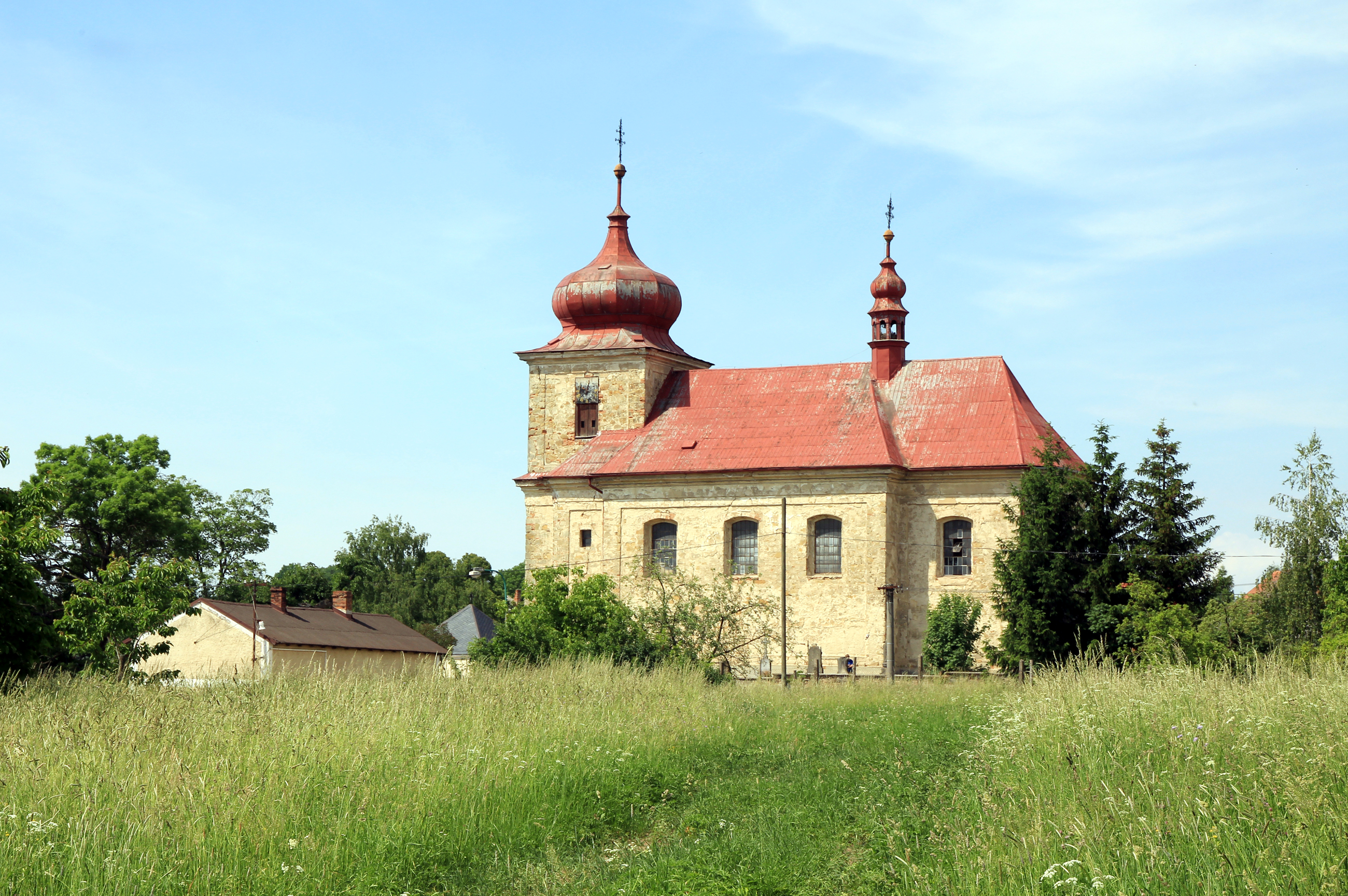
- Church of Saint Giles

- Location in the Czech Republic
- Coordinates: 50°25′51″N 15°11′46″E
- Country: Czech Republic
- Region: Hradec Králové
- District: Jičín
- First mentioned: 1188

Area
  - Total: 23.09 km^{2} (8.92 sq mi)
- Elevation: 356 m (1,168 ft)

Population (2026-01-01)
  - Total: 526
  - Density: 22.8/km^{2} (59.0/sq mi)
- Time zone: UTC+1 (CET)
  - Summer (DST): UTC+2 (CEST)
- Postal codes: 507 23, 507 42, 507 43
- Website: www.markvarticejc.cz

Markvartice is a municipality and village in Jičín District in the Hradec Králové Region of the Czech Republic. It has about 500 inhabitants.

== Administrative division ==
Markvartice consists of nine municipal parts (in brackets population according to the 2021 census):

- Markvartice (201)
- Hřmenín (67)
- Leština (1)
- Mrkvojedy (9)
- Netolice (13)
- Příchvoj (64)
- Rakov (68)
- Skuřina (52)
- Spařence (30)

== Demographics ==
Historical population
Year	Pop.	±%
1869	1,939	—
1880	1,893	−2.4%
1890	1,847	−2.4%
1900	1,790	−3.1%
1910	1,736	−3.0%
1921	1,715	−1.2%
1930	1,516	−11.6%
1950	1,096	−27.7%
1961	942	−14.1%
1970	777	−17.5%
1980	608	−21.8%
1991	488	−19.7%
2001	440	−9.8%
2011	449	+2.0%
2021	505	+12.5%
Source: Censuses
