= Nymburk =

- Town
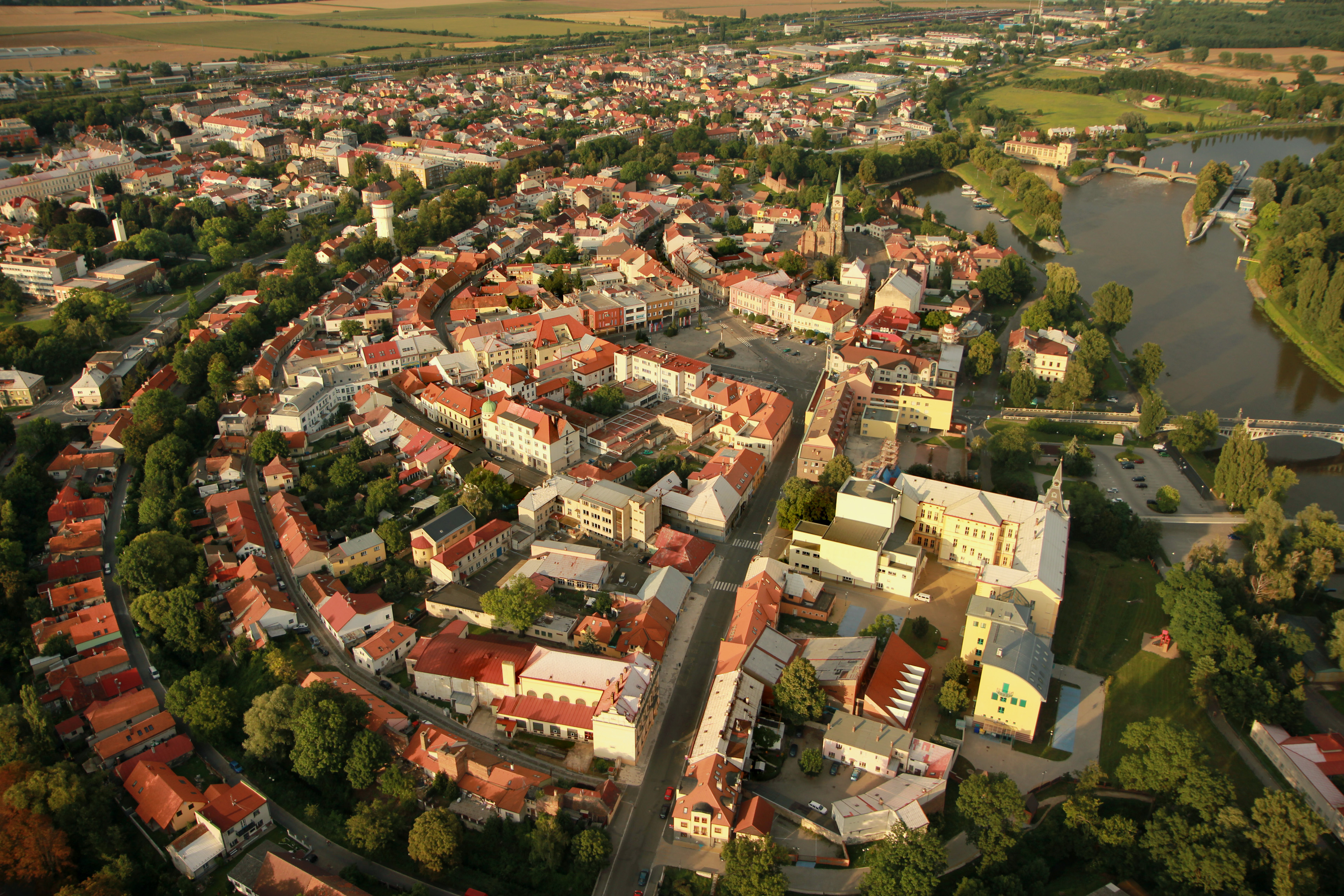
- Aerial view of Nymburk

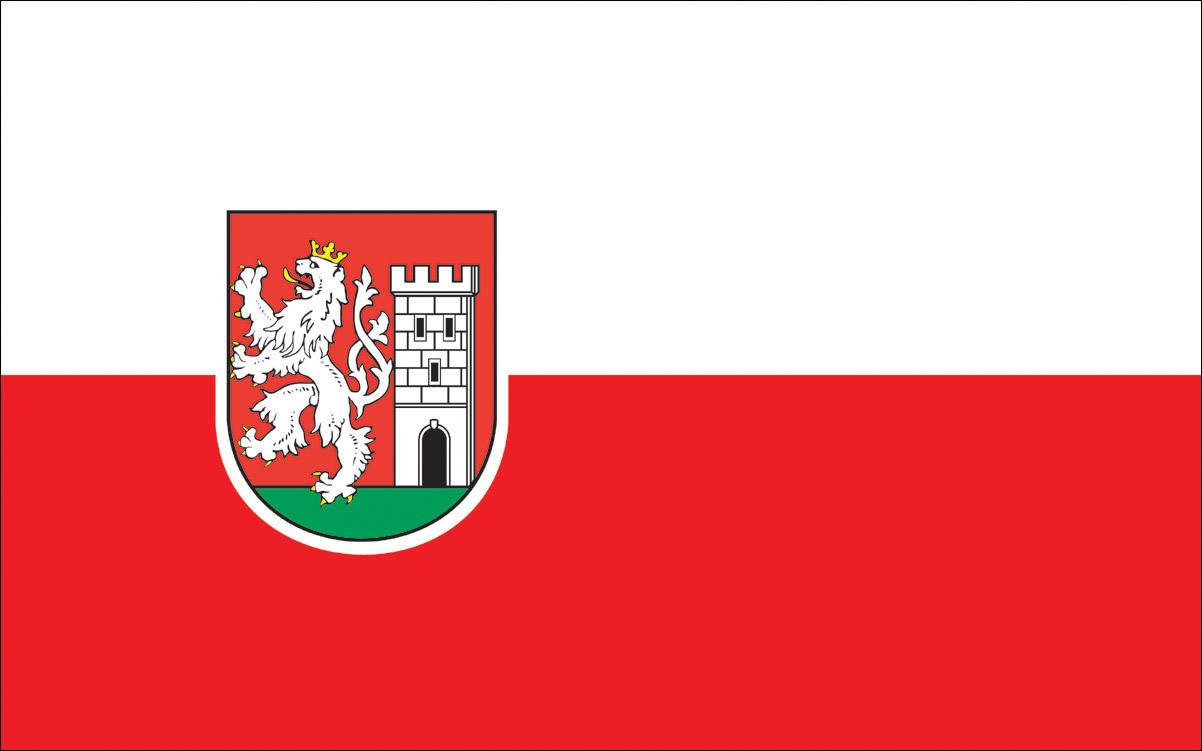
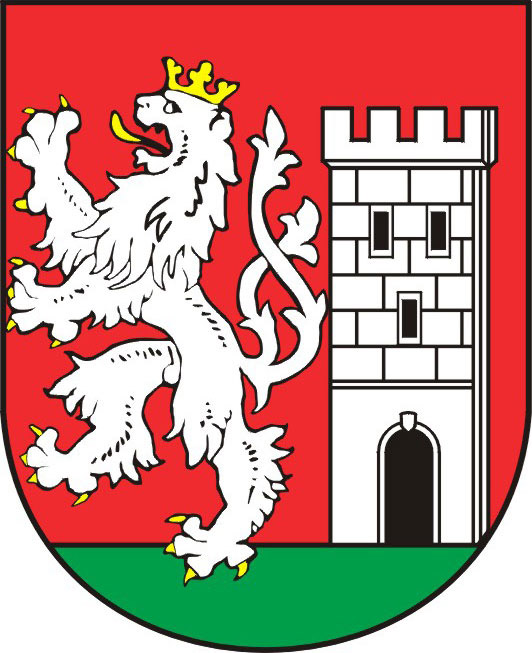
- Flag Coat of arms

- Location in the Czech Republic
- Coordinates: 50°11′10″N 15°2′30″E
- Country: Czech Republic
- Region: Central Bohemian
- District: Nymburk
- Founded: around 1275

Government
  - Mayor: Jan Ritter

Area
  - Total: 20.59 km^{2} (7.95 sq mi)
- Elevation: 193 m (633 ft)

Population (2026-01-01)
  - Total: 15,795
  - Density: 767.1/km^{2} (1,987/sq mi)
- Time zone: UTC+1 (CET)
  - Summer (DST): UTC+2 (CEST)
- Postal code: 288 02
- Website: www.mesto-nymburk.cz

Nymburk (Czech pronunciation: [ˈnɪmburk]; German: Nimburg, Neuenburg an der Elbe) is a town in the Central Bohemian Region of the Czech Republic. It has about 16,000 inhabitants. The town is located on the Elbe River in the Central Elbe Table and is a railway junction.

Nymburk was founded around 1275. The historic town centre is well preserved and is protected as an urban monument zone. The main landmark of Nymburk is the Church of Saint Giles.

== Administrative division ==
Nymburk consists of two municipal parts (in brackets population according to the 2021 census):

- Nymburk (13,944)
- Drahelice (853)

== Etymology ==
The name is derived from the Middle High German expression ze der Niuwen Burk, meaning 'at the new castle'. The name was soon transcribed into Czech as Nymburk.

== Geography ==
Nymburk is located about 35 kilometres (22 mi) east of Prague. It lies in a flat landscape in the Central Elbe Table within the Polabí lowland. The town is situated on both banks of the Elbe River and lies at the confluence of the Elbe and Mrlina rivers. The Výrovka River briefly crosses the municipal territory in the southwest.

== History ==
The town was founded around 1275 by King Ottokar II. Throughout the Middle Ages it was one of the most important and strategic towns in the kingdom, as it protected Prague and was an important pillar of royal power.

During the reign of King Wenceslaus II, the Church of St. Nicholas (today the Church of St. Giles) and the Dominican monastery were constructed. The town was surrounded by burnt-brick walls with about fifty towers and two defensive ditches fed from the Elbe. The Hussite Wars in the 15th century affected the town only slightly (the Dominican monastery was looted) and so the town prospered until the beginning of the 17th century.

During the Thirty Years' War, Nymburk was burned and looted, and the fortifications were almost completely destroyed. The recovery was disrupted by large fires. The turning point in the town's modern history was the introduction of the railway in 1870. Since then, the town has grown, new buildings have been built, the Elbe river has been regulated, and a new bridge and a hydroelectric power plant with a lock chamber have been built. The town has expanded beyond the medieval walls (some portions of which have been preserved). However, the original medieval floor plan has been completely preserved.

== Demographics ==
Historical population

Year	Pop.	±%
1869	3,475	—
1880	5,858	+68.6%
1890	7,057	+20.5%
1900	8,212	+16.4%
1910	10,886	+32.6%

Year	Pop.	±%
1921	11,853	+8.9%
1930	12,538	+5.8%
1950	11,914	−5.0%
1961	12,585	+5.6%
1970	13,263	+5.4%

Year	Pop.	±%
1980	14,033	+5.8%
1991	15,142	+7.9%
2001	14,407	−4.9%
2011	14,796	+2.7%
2021	14,797	+0.0%

Source: Censuses

== Economy ==
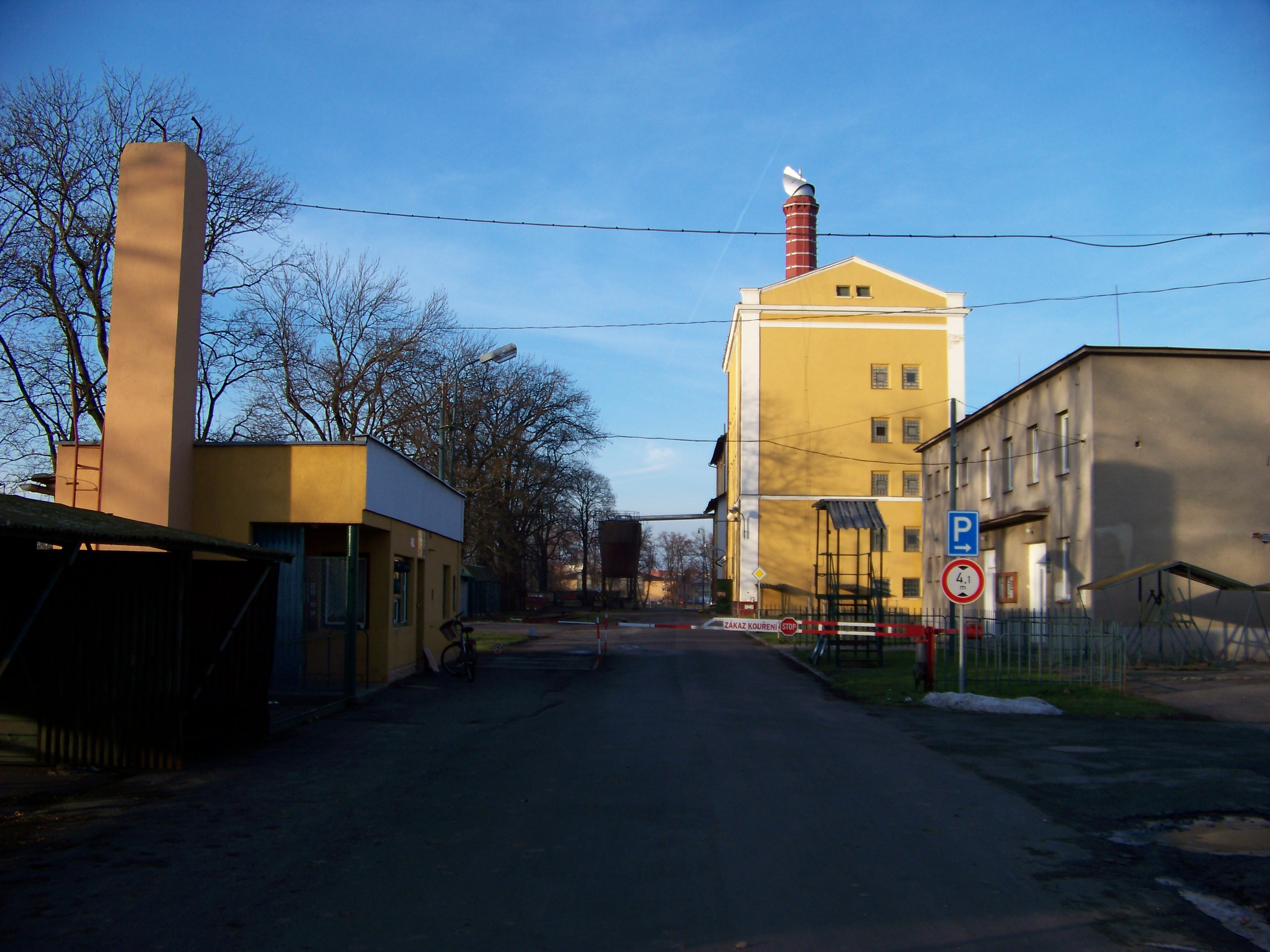
Nymburk Brewery

The brewery Pivovar Nymburk, located on the southern end of the town, was founded in 1895. With a production of about 200,000 hl/year, it is considered a medium-sized brewery in the Czech Republic. The brewery produces beer under the brand Postřižinské.

The largest employer in the town is the Nymburk Hospital with more than 500 employees. There are no large companies based in the town. The largest industrial employers are Pivovar Nymburk, NYMWAG CS (manufacturer of freight railway wagons), Maschinenfabrik Niehoff (manufacturer of machines for processing non-ferrous metals) and Kelvion (manufacturer of heat exchange devices), all of them with more than 100 employees.

== Transport ==
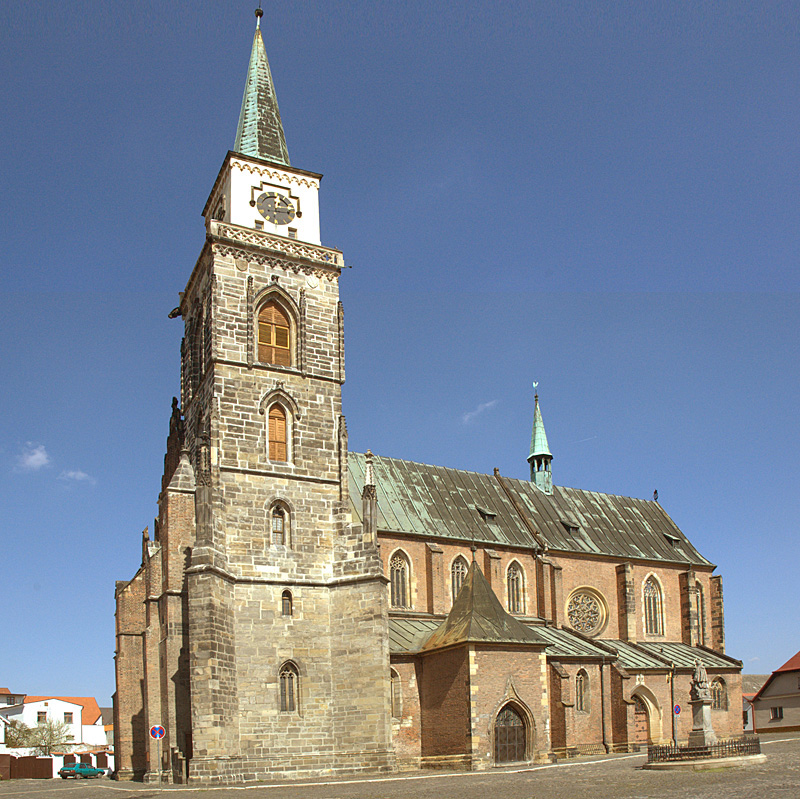
Church of Saint Giles

The I/38 road from Mladá Boleslav to Kolín runs through the town.

Nymburk is a railway junction at the crossing of several railway lines: Prague–Kolín, Prague–Trutnov, Kolín–Rumburk, Nymburk–Mladá Boleslav, Nymburk–Rožďalovice and Nymburk–Poříčany.

== Sport ==
The town was home to Basketball Nymburk, the most successful club of the Czech National Basketball League with 21 titles. It played its home games at the Sportovní centrum stadium. After the 2025–26 season, the club merged with SK Slavia Prague and moved to Prague.

Since 2015, an annual international rink bandy tournament has taken place in Nymburk. In 2017, the Federation of International Bandy decided to make the Nymburk tournament official.

The town's football club is SK Polaban Nymburk, playing in lower amateur tiers.

== Sights ==
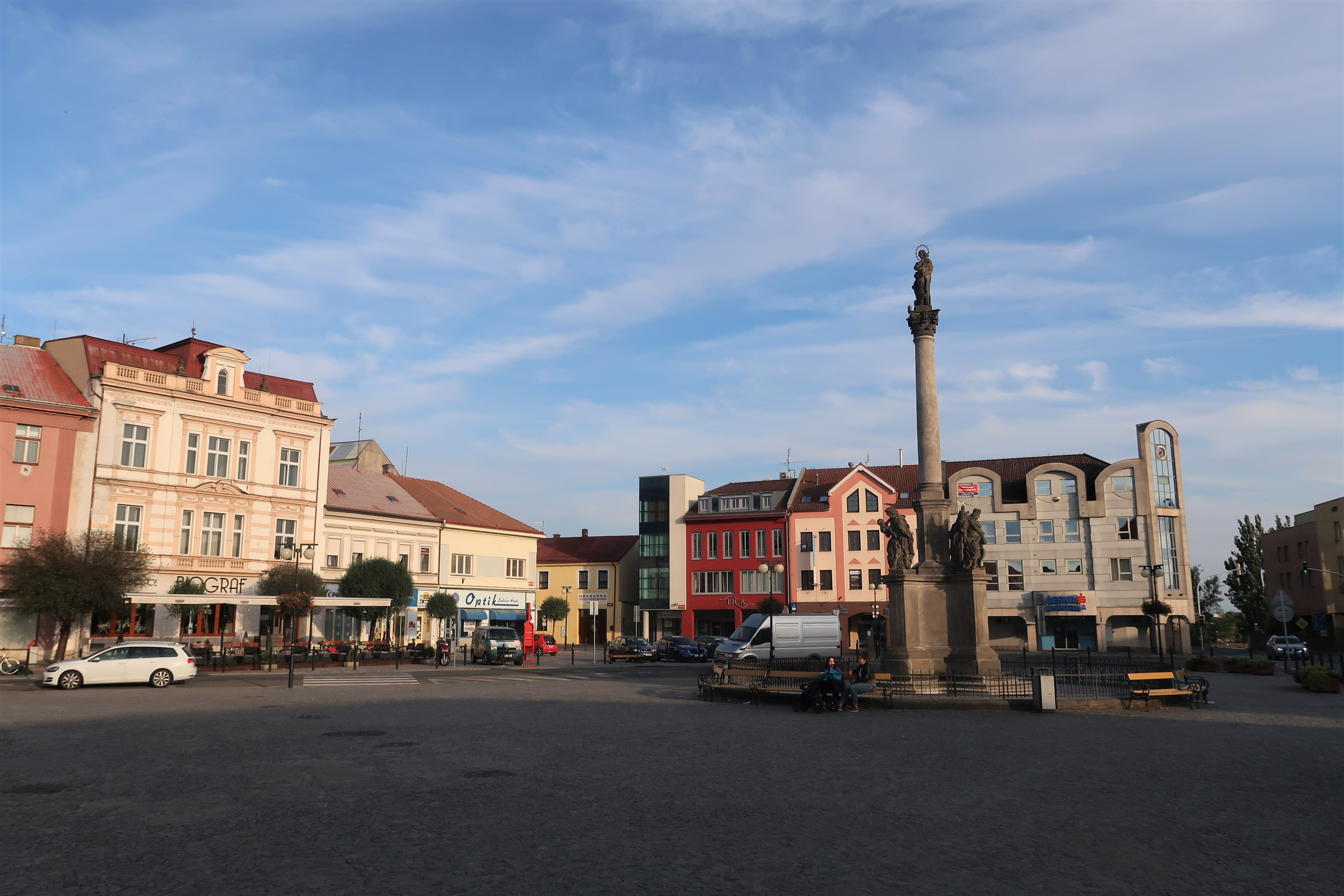
The square Náměstí Přemyslovců with the Plague column

The dominant feature of the town is the Gothic brick Church of Saint Giles, built in 1280–1380. This church, together with the preserved buildings of the Nymburk fortification, is a unique example of brick Gothic (originally North German) architecture in the Czech lands. The main landmark of the square is a rare Renaissance town hall from 1526.

Besides the preserved sections of the town walls, the town also features a road bridge from 1913, which connects the town centre with the neighbourhood of Zálabí. Other important cultural monuments of Nymburk are the Turkish tower (the former waterworks from 1597), the Plague column (built in 1717), the Chapel of St. John of Nepomuk (originally a part of the Dominican monastery), the Bohumil Hrabal Grammar School, the Nymburk Synagogue, the tourist information centre, the water tower and the Old Fisher House.

== In literature ==
Bohumil Hrabal, who grew up in the town, wrote about Nymburk in his books The Little Town Where Time Stood Still, Cutting It Short, Beautiful Sadness, Harlequin's Millions and Closely Watched Trains.

== Notable people ==
- Bohuslav Matěj Černohorský (1684–1742), composer and organist
- Josef Kramolín (1730–1802), painter
- Antonín Janoušek (1877–1941), journalist and politician
- Karel Dostal (1884–1966), actor
- Bohumil Hrabal (1914–1997), writer; lived here in his childhood and youth
- Miroslav Macháček (1922–1991), theatre director and actor
- Vratislav Effenberger (1923–1986), literature theoretician
- Radek Bejbl (born 1972), footballer
- Jan Bořil (born 1991), footballer
- Martin Fuksa (born 1993), canoeist

== Twin towns – sister cities ==
Nymburk is twinned with:

- Neuruppin, Germany
- Porto San Giorgio, Italy
- Vrútky, Slovakia
- Żarów, Poland

== Gallery ==
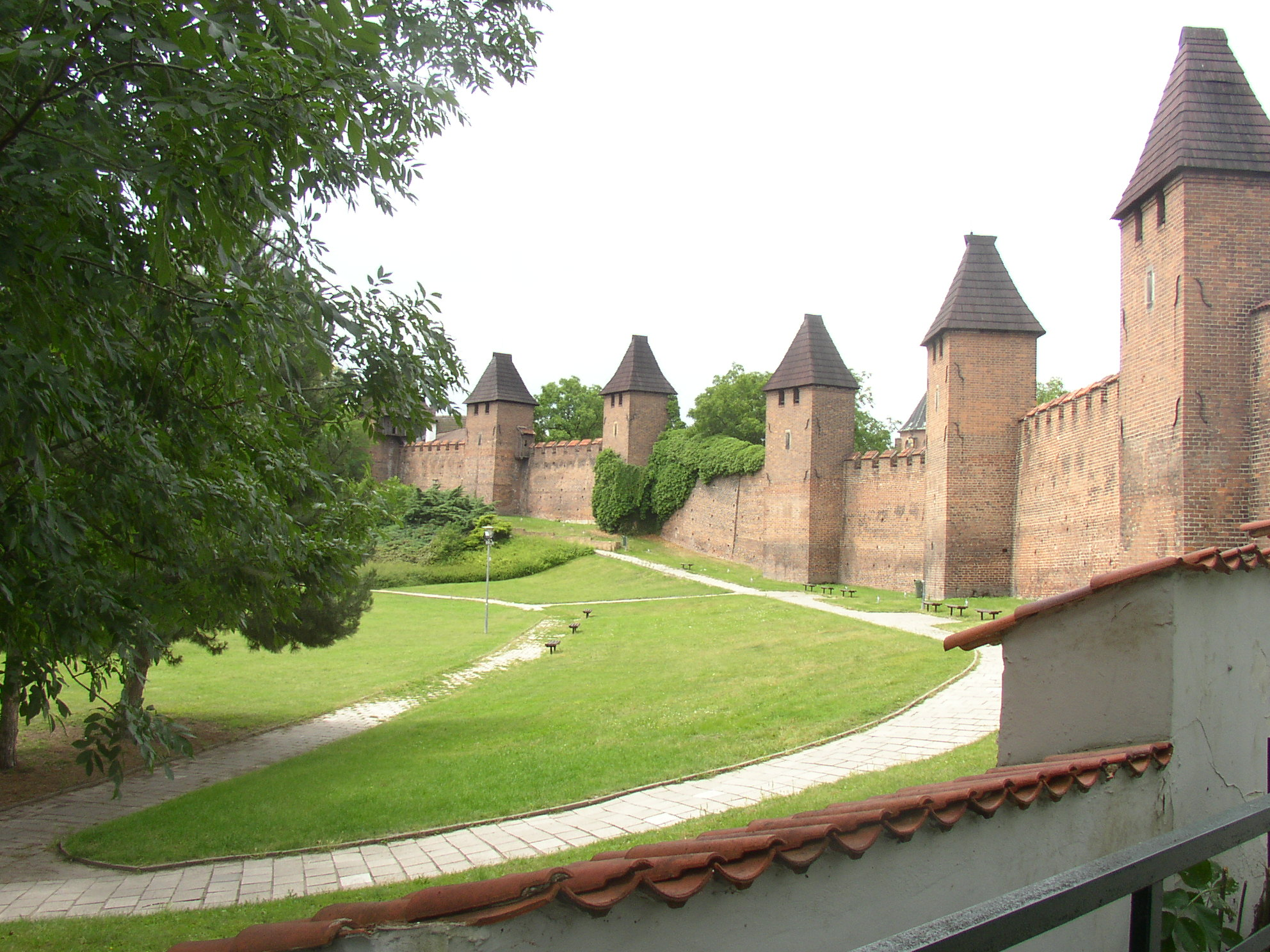
Medieval walls

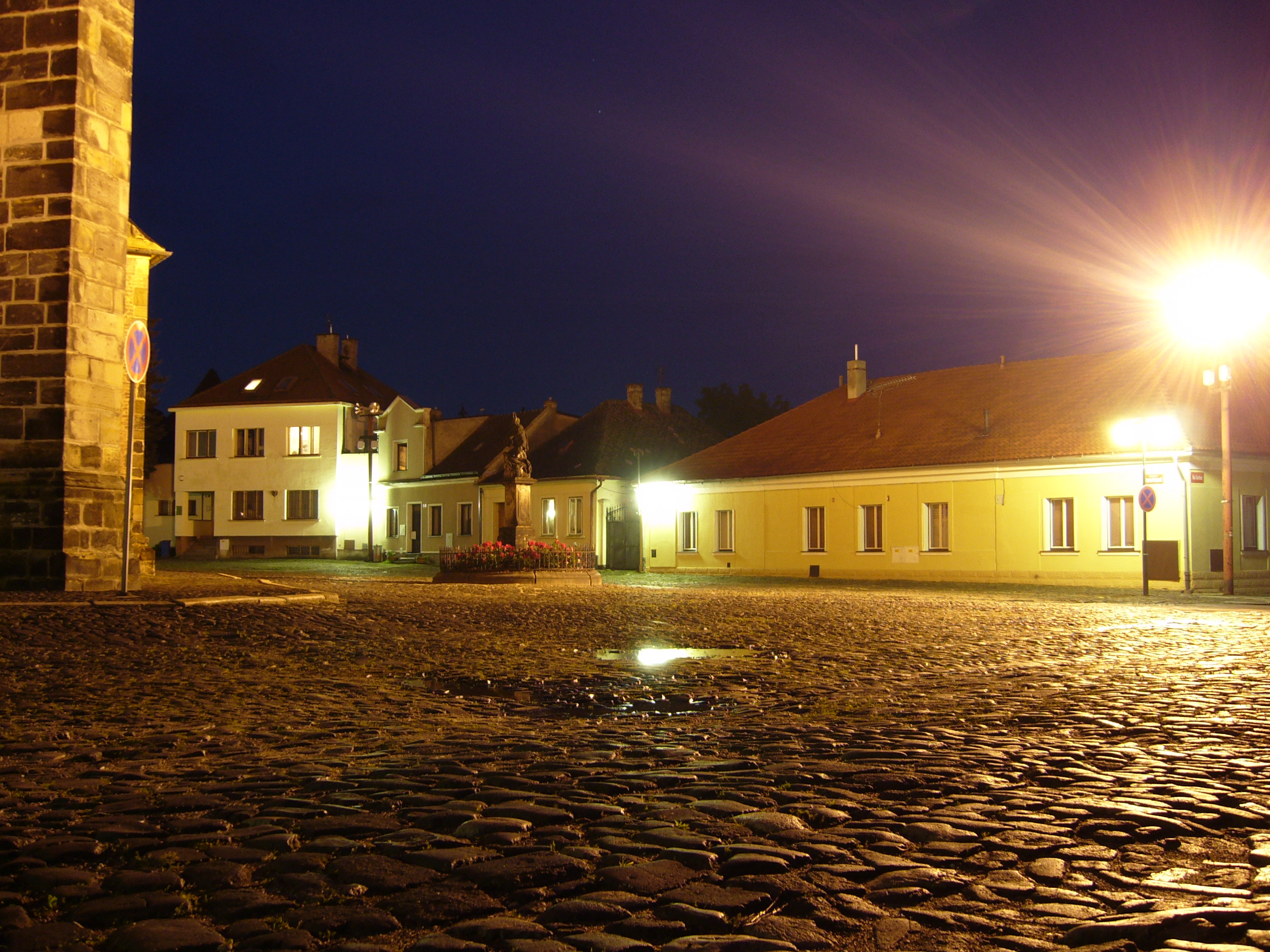
The square Kostelní náměstí

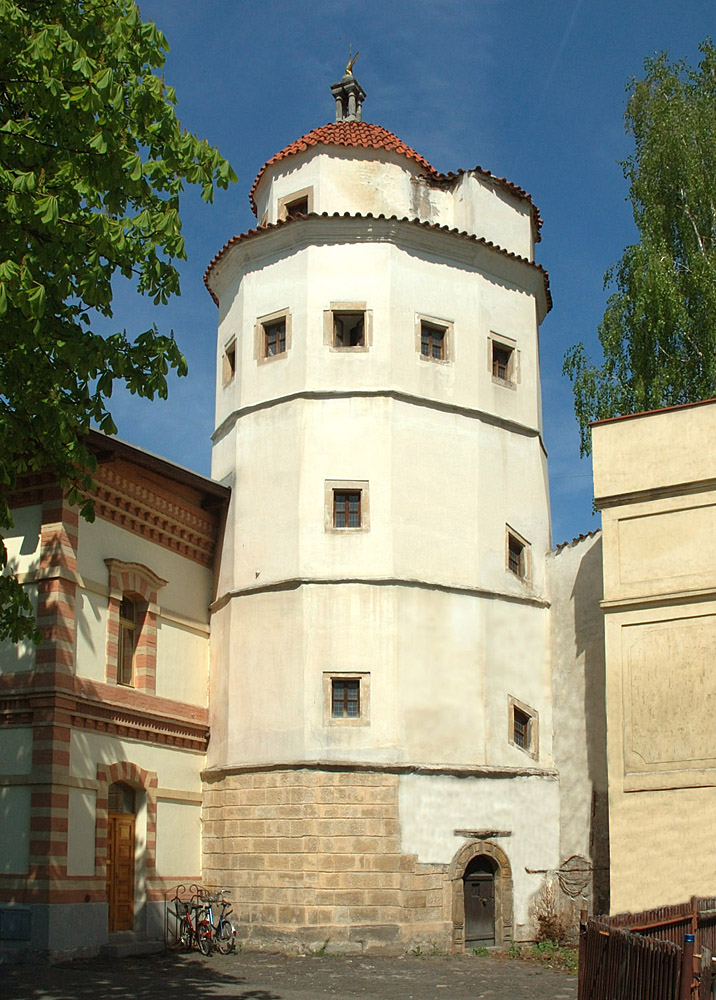
Turkish tower

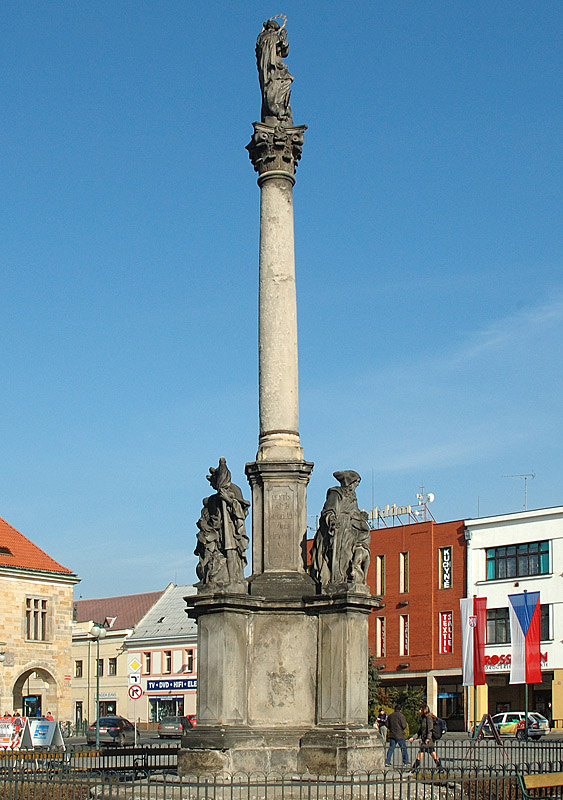
Plague column

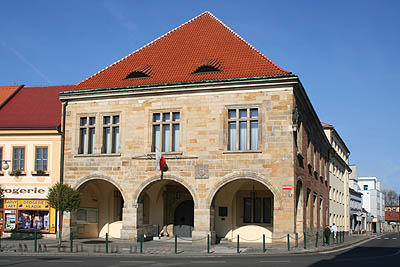
Renaissance town hall

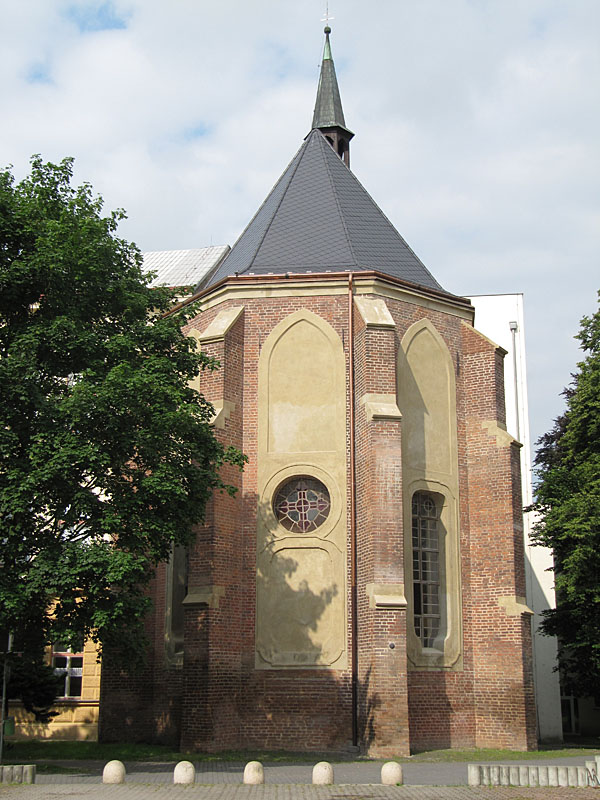
Chapel of St. John of Nepomuk

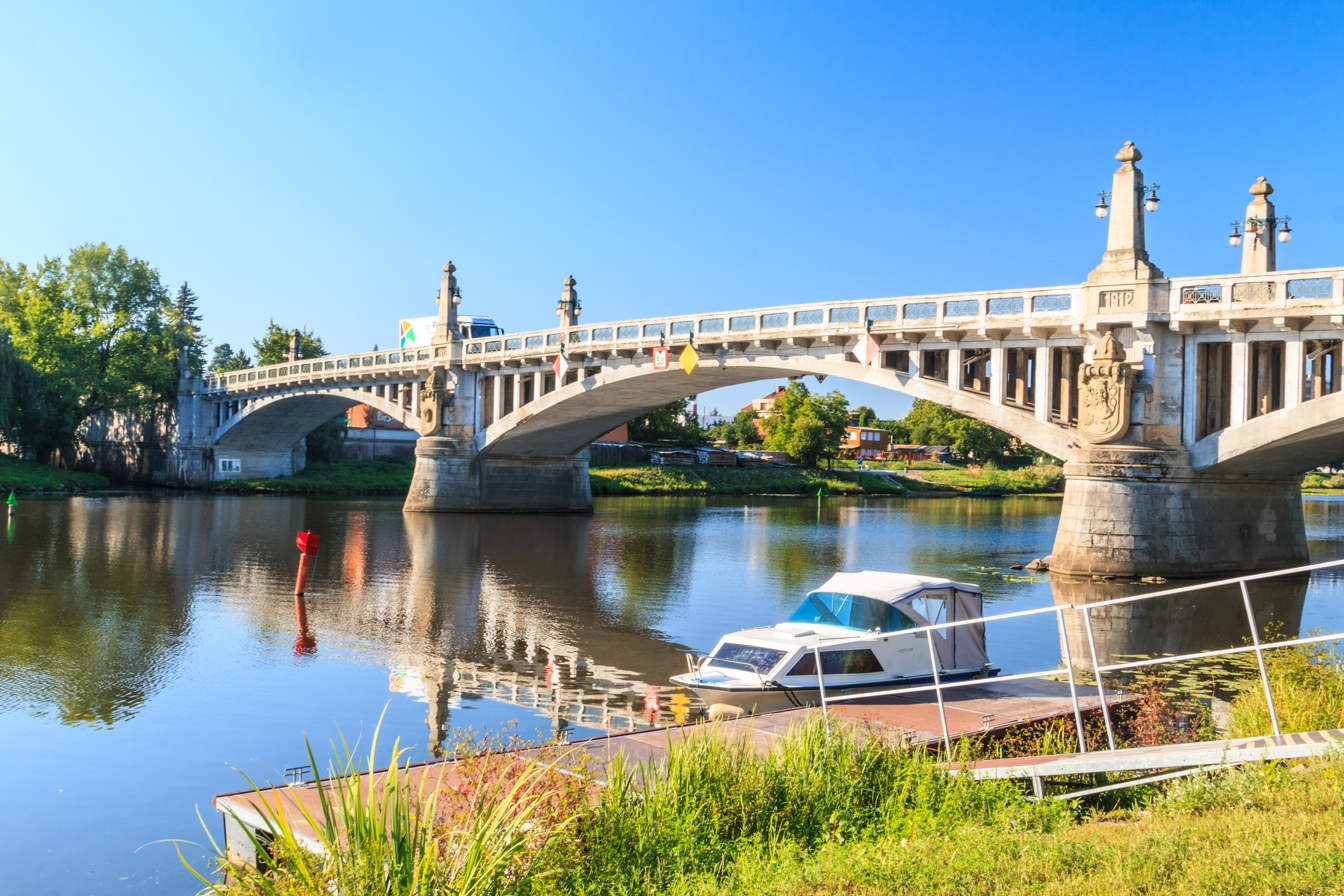
Road bridge over the Elbe

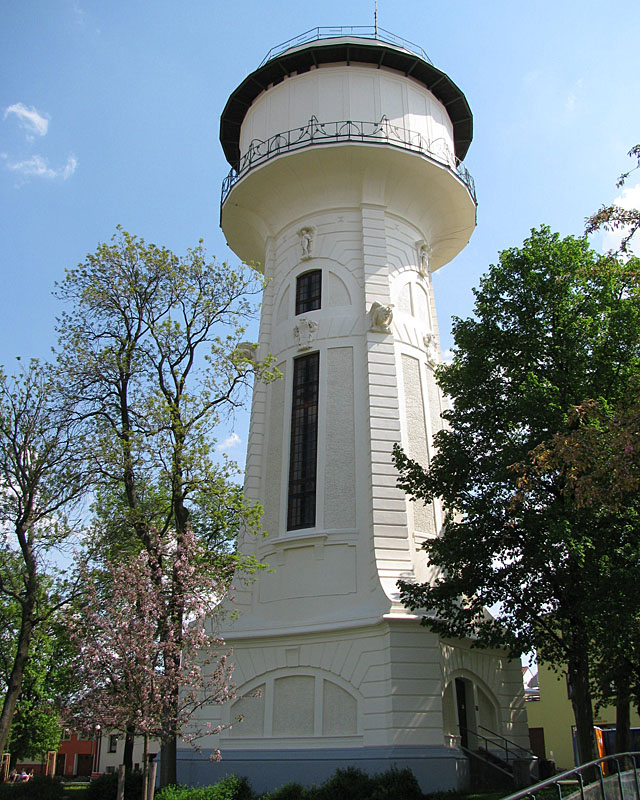
Art Nouveau water tower

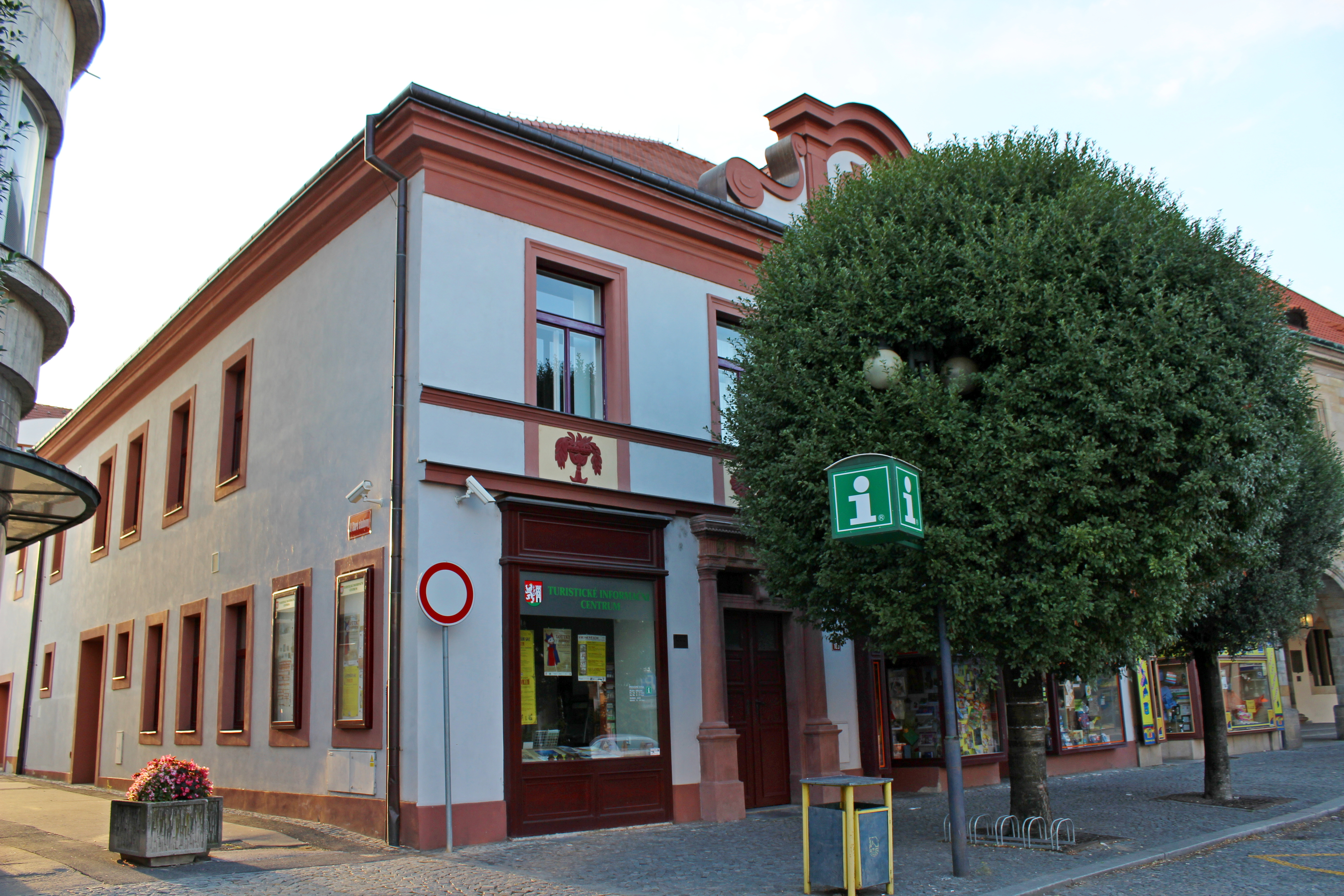
Tourist Information Centre House

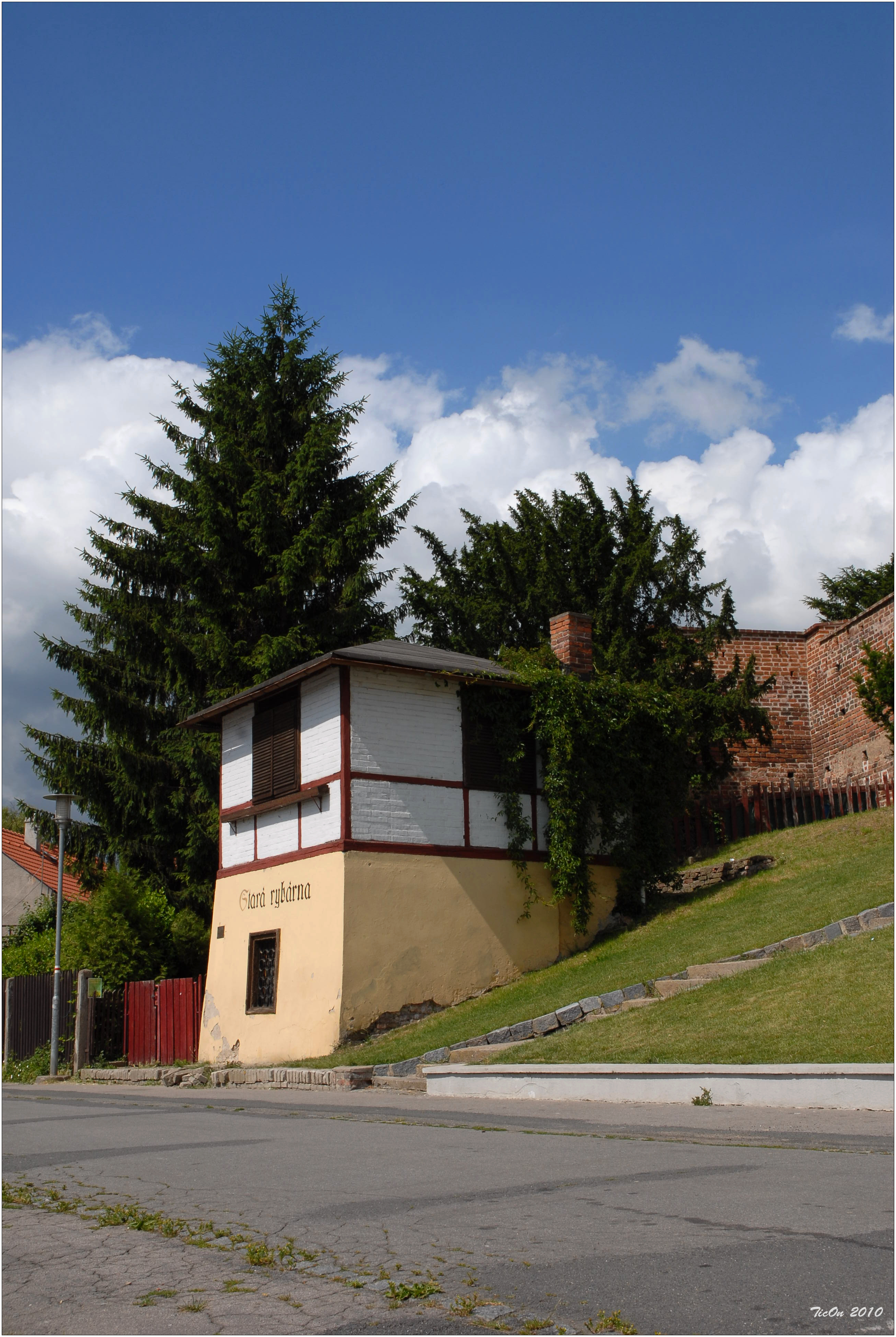
Old Fisher House

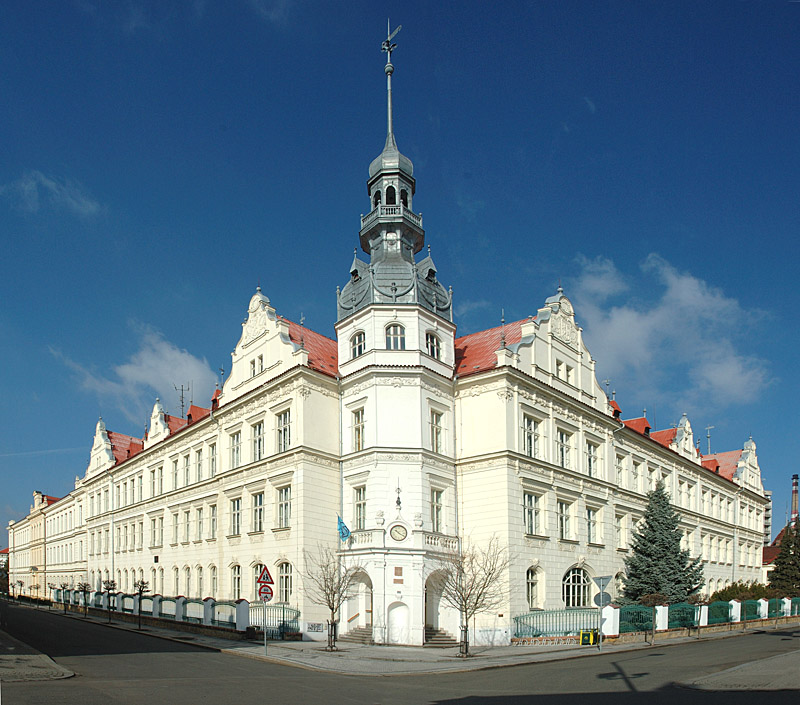
Gymnasium
