= Church of Saint Giles, Nymburk =

Church in the Czech Republic

Coordinates: 50°11′9.32″N 15°2′37.83″E

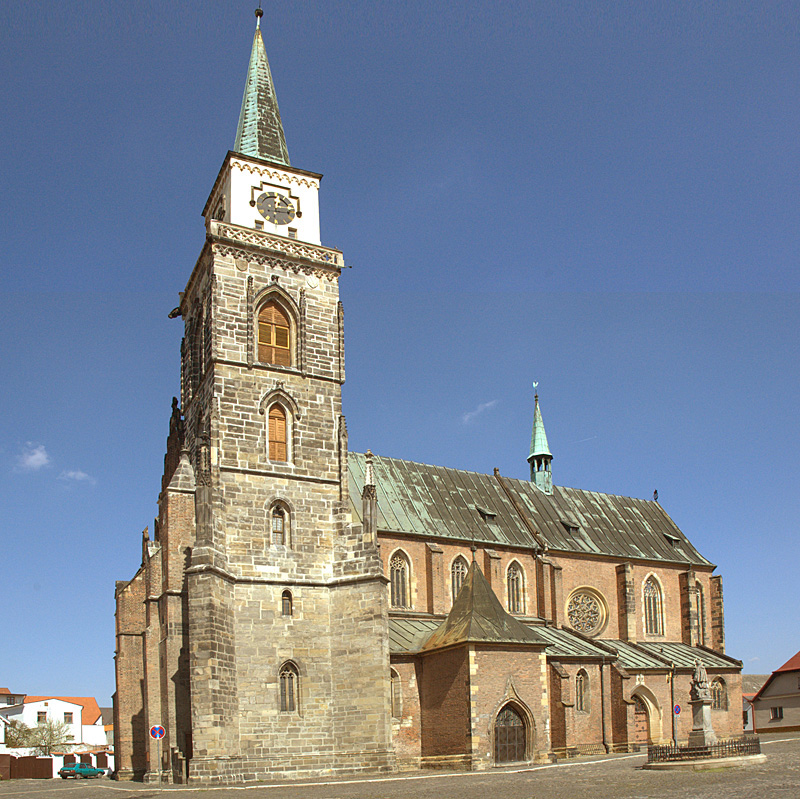
Church of St. Giles

Church of Saint Giles (Czech: Kostel svatého Jiljí) is a church in Nymburk in the Central Bohemian Region of the Czech Republic. It is located in the centre of Nymburk on the square Kostelní náměstí. The church was probably built in the 13th century, as well as the surrounding town, however, there are no preserved sources confirming its origins. The church is a three nave basilica with a long chancel and a tower in the front. There was also a second tower, but now there are only its remains.

The temple is an example of brick Gothic architecture, excepting a few parts which are made from sandstone. Its thin tower reaches 66 metres (217 ft) and together with mediaeval ramparts creates a characteristic silhouette of the town. The dean's church was initially dedicated to Saint Nicholas, during the Thirty Years' War the dedication changed to Saint Giles. The church is protected as a cultural monument.

== History ==
=== Church foundation ===
Due to a lack of preserved historical sources, it is hard to specify the time of its foundation. Yet historians assume, on the base of the architecture style analysis, connection between foundation of the town and the church origin. The oldest document referring about the town history is a charter of Ottokar II about foundation Nymburk's Dominican monastery at the end of the 13th century. Mendicant monastery foundation probably went hand to hand with origin of the town, a rectory and a church, that days it was the church of St. Nicholas. Therefore, church beginnings are estimated during the reign of Ottokar II and the construction during the reign of his son Wenceslaus II. Special rare technic of fair-face brickwork was probably brought here by town settlers. These settlers, professional town founders, from the north-west Flanders, were commissioned by Ottokar II.

=== Phases ===
The church was constructed in phases, therefore contain couple various styles. The oldest one is an early Gothic presbytery with a pentagonal (octagonal) apse coming from the second half of the 13th century. Into the chancel was an access by a south portal, the portal had a highly profiled Gothic pointed arch. A northern sacristy was also constructed at the same time, as well as a north chapel of Virgin Mary of Vienna. In 1343 the church burned out and was reconstructed. Alongside the reconstruction were probably added basilical naves and a northern brick tower, that tower was called "red" or "old". Extension in its final phase was under the control of archbishop Jan Očko of Vlašim. At the turn of the 14th and the 15th century the church was supported by a generosity of burghers, and their gifts. At the reign of the king Charles IV was added a southern tower known as "white", made of sandstone blocks, and a rectangular shaped chapel of St. Dorothy by the southern face of the chancel. The youngest parts of the church are a southern and a northern porch, both constructed by side entrances around the year 1500.

Big impact also had the Thirty Years' War. Tough circumstances deeply influence the town, its citizens and the church too. The town was twice conquered and damaged in the 1630s by Saxony's army. That accident happened on 16 August 1634. When Saxons got occupied the town, they broke through the north gate of the church and murdered almost 200 residents (including women and children) hiding inside. Therefore, is the north entrance no longer in use and closed forever. Nowadays sad happening remains memorial placed on the wall of the church.

After the Thirty Years' War, a builder D. Augustin made a Baroque vault over the presbytery and modify the whole structure. (The tower was roofed by Baroque helmets again in the year 1985.) Leopold I financially supported reparations after the fire in 1686. The red tower was couple times struck by a lightning due to burned out and cracks. Thus had to be supported by a large loading pillar. Through the pillar was made a vaulted gate for the passage. During 1846 was demolished part of the brick tower above a crown cornice of the church. In the second half of 19th-century architect Bernard Grueber designed regotisation of the church, yet implemented was just partially by architect Matěj Červený between 1862 and 1866. Architect Josef Mocker joined the reconstruction too. The white – southern tower got a thin pyramidal roof and a gallery with a neo-Gothic balustrade. Baroque vault was hidden and replaced with a lower neo-Gothic one. Between years 1913 and 1918 architect Kamil Hilbert led a reconstruction of the church. There was also working academic painter František Fišer from Prague. Hilbert removed neo-Gothic modifications and restored the church into the original Gothic form. He made a new vault in the presbytery, removed a supporting pillar, opened windows which had been filled, restored, or might designed himself, a window tracery and modify portals. His reconstruction was the last for many years, because the next works on the church took place in the year 1985. That days was restored a fresco altar in the southern nave, a damaged old Spanish tile roof was replaced with copper sheets too. Electrical wiring was repaired by parishioners themselves and then the church was painted. In the 90s the general reconstruction of the tower took place, sponsored by the town and state funds. A trampled tiled floor of the southern nave was replaced in 2003. Around the church was a town cemetery, used until 1787 and finally cancelled in 1821. Today there is a paved square around the church.

== Architecture ==
=== Floorplan ===
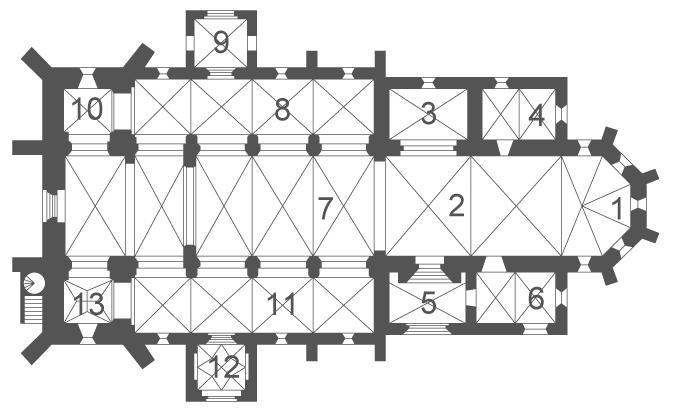
Floorplan of the church

- 1 Octagonal apse
- 2 Presbytary
- 3 Chapel of the Virgin Mary of Vienna
- 4 Old sacristy
- 5 Southern porch of presbytery
- 6 New sacristy
- 7 Main nave of the church
- 8 Northern nave
- 9 Northern porch
- 10 Northern tower
- 11 Southern nave
- 12 Southern porch
- 13 Chapel of St. Dorothy, southern tower

=== The presbytery ===
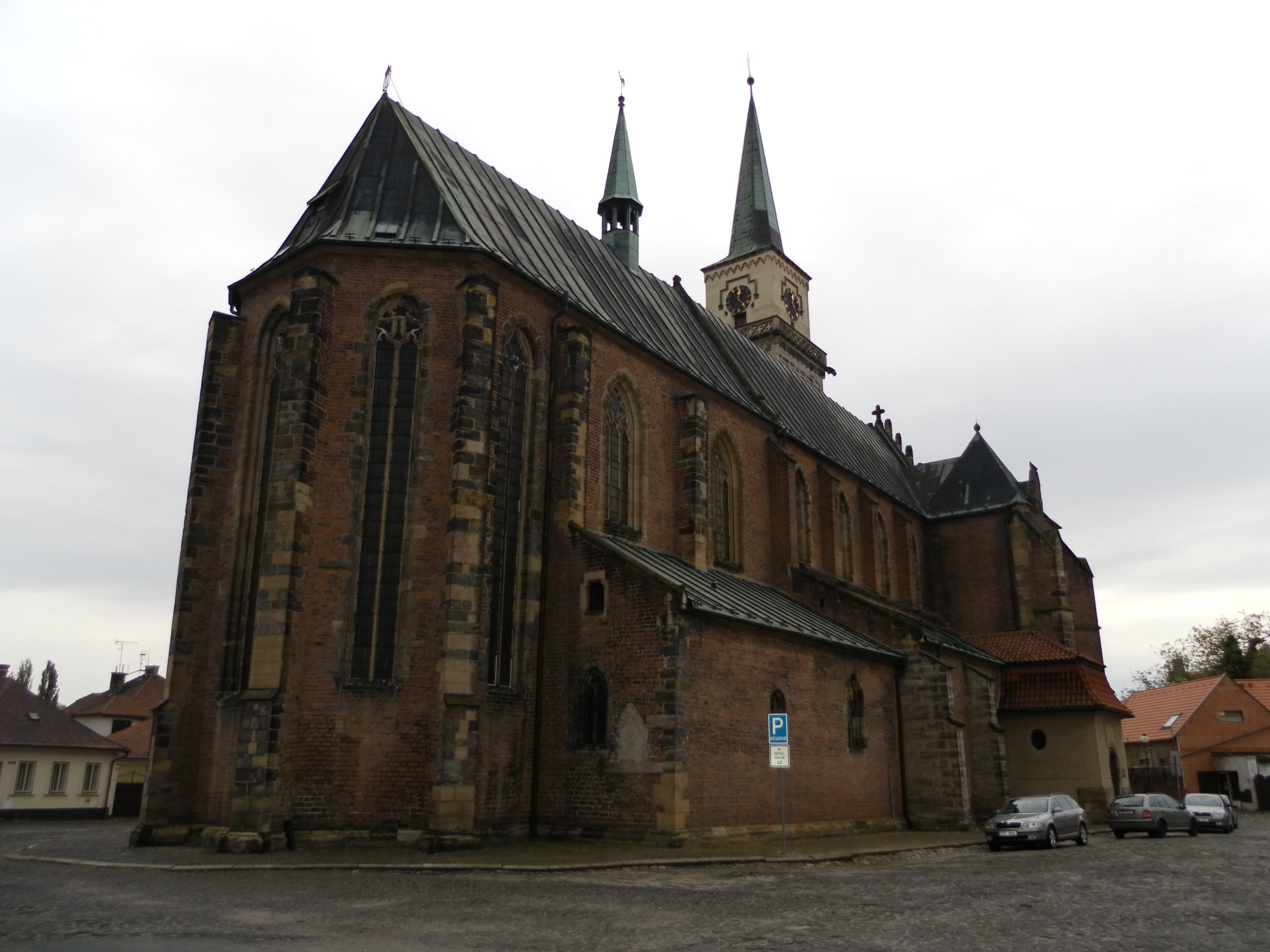
The presbytery

The presbytery has two vault fields and a five-sided apse, which is recognisable from outside, thank to supporting pillars. There are ten pillars, eight of them made mostly of sandstone blocks, each finished with a small gable roof. There are eight pointed arch shaped windows into the presbytery. Three of them are in the longitudinal walls together with a rosette window. Architect Kamil Hilbert modified them, he reopened windows which had been cancelled during the Baroque adaptation of the church. He rebuilt an original jambs with a double groove and a divided pear shaped shaft. Window traceries consist of trefoils, quatrefoils, five-pointed and six-pointed stars and a rose. Under the roof alongside the presbytery runs the crown cornice with a simple groove. Kamil Hilbert also built a new rib vault in both fields of the presbytery and in the apse. Big ribs uses remains of Tas-de-charges, original springings and corbels. Corbels are designed as a plant plastic ornament. A crossing arch separating the nave from the choir is formed by a wide rectangular strip running continuously to the ground. There is also a pear shaped profile running with the rectangular strip. Its pear shaped capitals have similar character as those in the presbytery. Keystones of the vault are decorated with symbols of Adam and Eve, music and a sign of the town with the year of the vault reconstruction, in the centre.

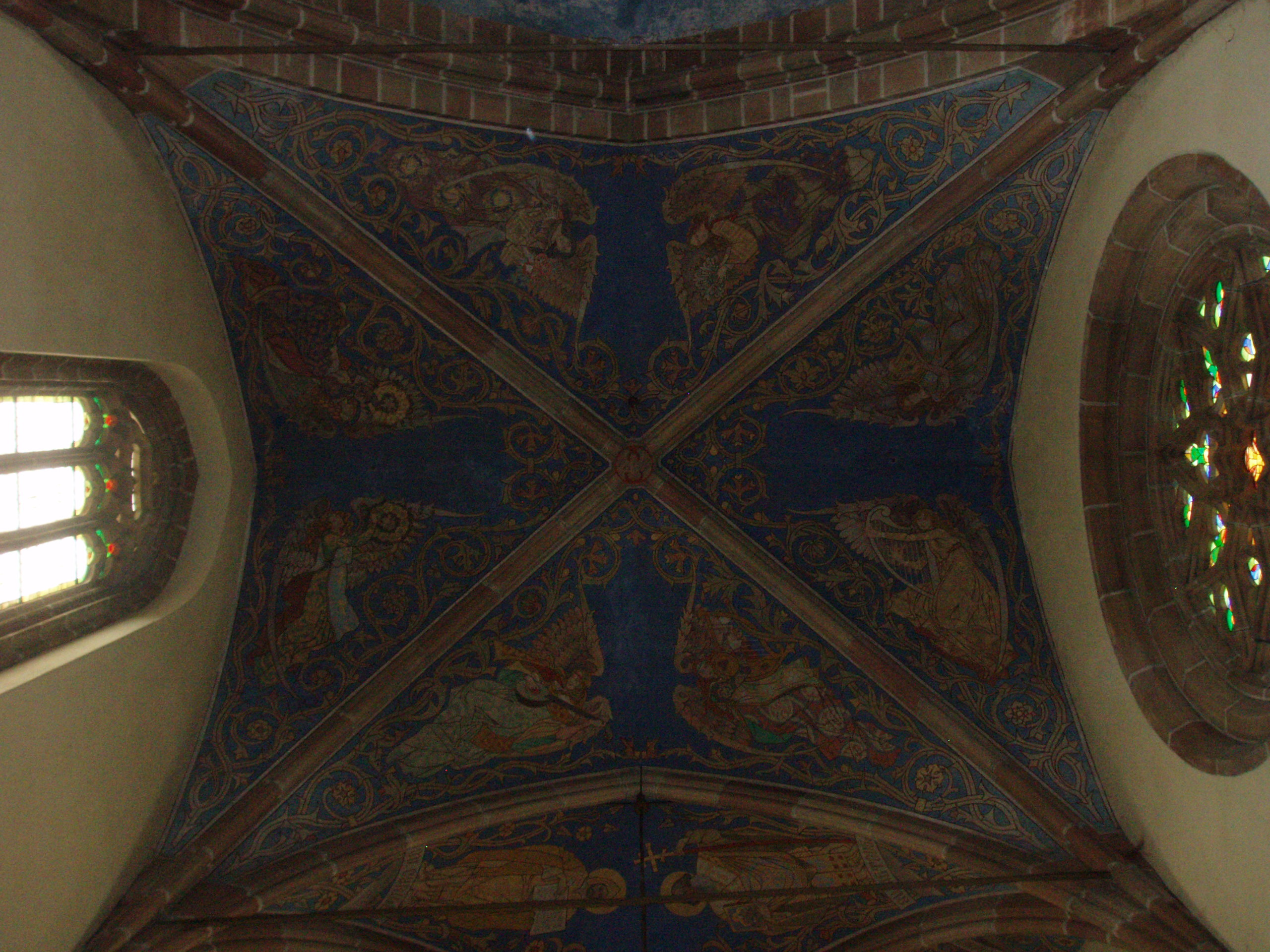
The presbytery – interior

The vault in the presbytery has frescoes called "Czech heaven" finished in 1915 by artist Artuš Scheiner. On the apse vault are visible signs of four evangelists. And in the vault next to the nave are frescoes of cherubs playing on musical instruments. To the presbytery belongs old sacristy and the chapel of Virgin Mary of Vienna. From the outside they are joined as one object and there is no buttress between them. Here is a window with pointed arch and a simple tracery bringing light into the chapel. For lighting up the sacristy there are two windows one with pointed arch and the second one circular. The old sacristy has two fields of the ribbed vault newly built by Kamil Hilbert. By the southern side of the presbytery is located the contemporary sacristy. Light goes inside through couple windows with oblique jambs and tracery. The sacristy has two ribbed cross-vault fields. Ribs there have a wedge profile. Ribs are loaded by canopy corbels. Remains of two frescoes are here and a well-preserved inscription on the wall. Next to the sacristy is a porch, added at the beginning of the 16th century. The porch has a simple late-Gothic portal. The portal was reconstructed in the 20th century, has two masks on the sides by a sculptor Stanislav Sucharda and is finished with a final. In the southern porch was a star rib vault as it was under the white tower, but Kamil Hilbert removed it. Probably the most impressive part of the whole structure is the original southern portal of the presbytery, with its massive pointed arch running deep into the wall. The portal jamb is highly decorated with pear shaped, cylindrical and rectangular profiled shafts. The arch is decorated from the outside with a belt of plastic grapes leaves. In the tympanum above the portal is a sculpture of Ottokar II, made by the sculptor S. Sucharda. From his workshop also came a coat of arms of the Czech kingdom and the town Nymburk, placed on walls in the southern porch.

=== The nave and aisles ===
Another part of the church is a basilical nave with aisles on both sides. The central vessel is lighted up directly. Above the western part of side vessels are built towers. The central vessel has the same height as the presbytery and has ten brick buttresses finished with a small gable roof. The main vessel has nine windows, and one of them goes through west front face wall. Other eight are located in the upper third of side walls. From the outside, all windows has a continuous moulding under them. Below the moulding starts a shed roof of side vessels. Ribs in all four vault fields load a cross vault. There are three keystones with heraldic signs and vegetative motives, one keystone is missing and there is a circular opening left out through the vault. The vault is decorated with a narrow belt of vegetative motives only. Above the porch is the fifth vault field but with a Baroque vault. Today a gallery is extended into an extra field there, and on the internal front face is a fresco probably coming from the 17th century. On the gallery is an organ from the workshop of a crafter Josef Tuček from Kutná Hora.

Between side vessels and the main nave are arcades. In the north there is the side vessel with three windows and two buttresses joining the central nave. The cross vault has four fields in the row and one separated by a belt because in the past this field load the northern tower. Next to the northern nave was added a square shaped porch with a ribbed vault. The porch was modified during the 17th century. The southern nave has a similar disposition as the northern one, yet the fifth vault field is different. There is a chapel under the white tower. It has a star shaped vault supported by corbels with a figural decor. To the southern nave belongs a square shaped porch from the 15th century with a Late-gothic portal. The portal has an intersecting string in the ogee shape jamb. The porch has an octagonal pyramidal roof.

=== Towers and west front face ===
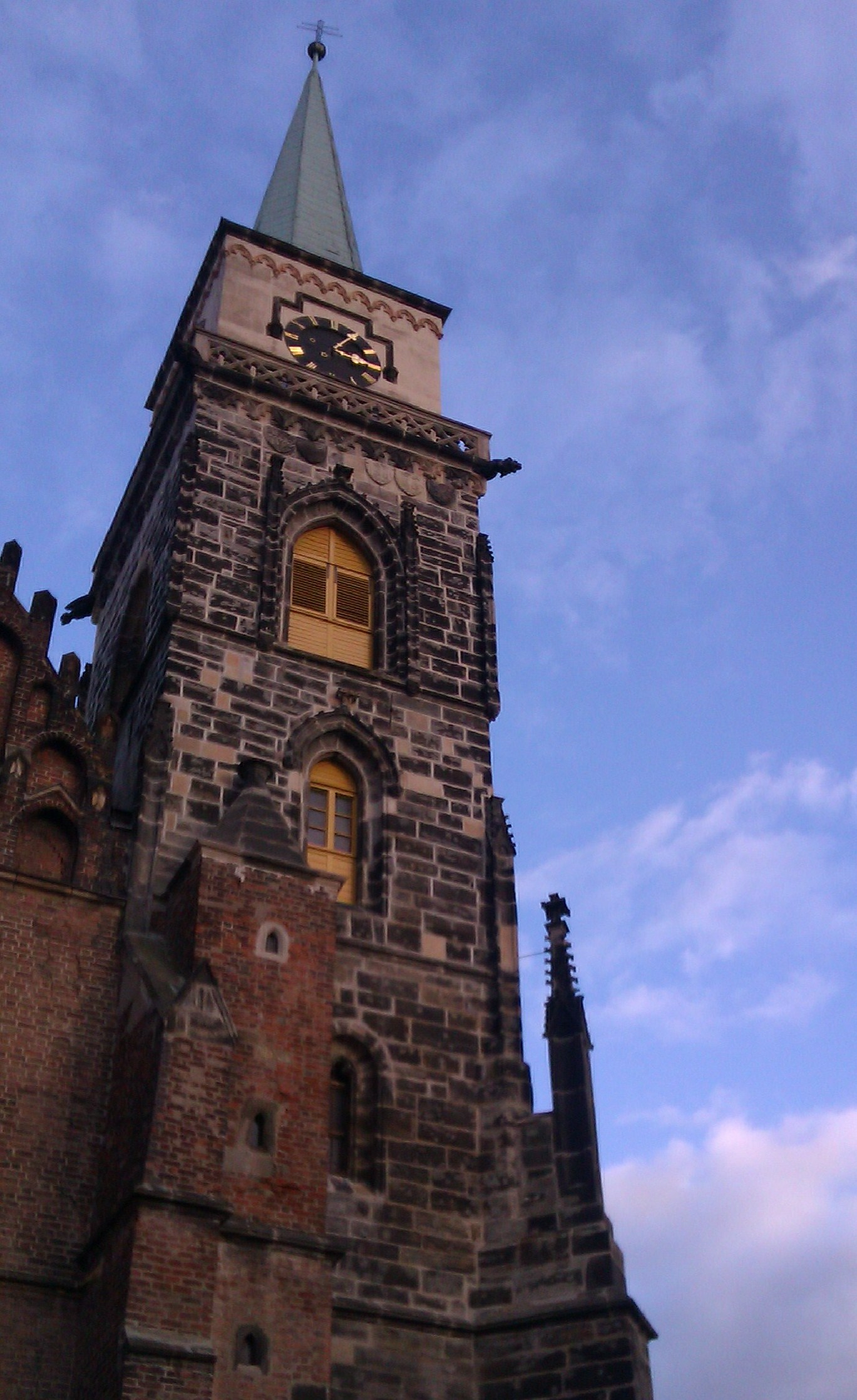
The tower of the church

The northern tower is no longer there except of its remains under the level of the crowning cornice. During the direction of Kamil Hilbert was moved the vault from the southern porch of the presbytery into the first floor of the northern tower. The southern tower has four levels separated by stone mouldings. The tower has two buttresses, buttresses are finished with pinnacles and the Gothic rose at the top. Pinnacles are also at corners of the second and the third floor. In the ground floor is one narrow twin lancet widow. In the first and the second floor are four large pointed windows. Above the third floor was added a cube of the fourth floor in the 20th century. On the forth floor is a room for guardian and four clocks. Around the fourth floor runs a gallery with a stone balustrade. There is only one preserved gargoyle, four others are new. Original is also a belt of tetra-foils under the balustrade and five coats of arms lower.

Between the tower and the buttress is a staircase with five small Gothic windows. The staircase is roofed above the first floor by an octagonal stone pyramid. An entrance to the stairs was originally from the chapel under the tower through Gothic portal. The portal has a tympanum with the sign of Nymburk. But the portal is hidden into the wall nowadays. On the west face of the church is a smaller Pseudo-gothic portal, between two towers. The portal is used as the main entrance into the church. The front face is finished with a high gable in the shape of an equilateral triangle. And its upper sides have battlements. The gable consists of belts of blind arcades.

=== Interior ===
The church has many interesting and valuable things inside. The most valuable one is a plastic of the first patron St. Nicholas, made of stone. The plastic probably came from the workshop of a sculptor Peter Parler (the 14th century) but it might be even older than that. Its original place was at the top of the buttress in the south, but today is protected against weather conditions inside. Most of church's equipment is in the Baroque style. The main altar in the front is from 1704. F. M. Kotterbauer the carver from Kutná Hora made it. A highly decorated tabernacle was made in 1916 according to the design by Kamil Hilbert. The author of an altar picture is unknown. The picture shows the second patron – the hermit St. Giles. František Adámek made most sculptures inside and the pulpit in the year 1770 too. Other pictures come from workshops of Baroque artists Václav and Josef Kramolín (native Nymburk citizens), Jan Mountain, J. J. Hentsch, Ignác Müller and Josef Hellich.

== Gallery ==
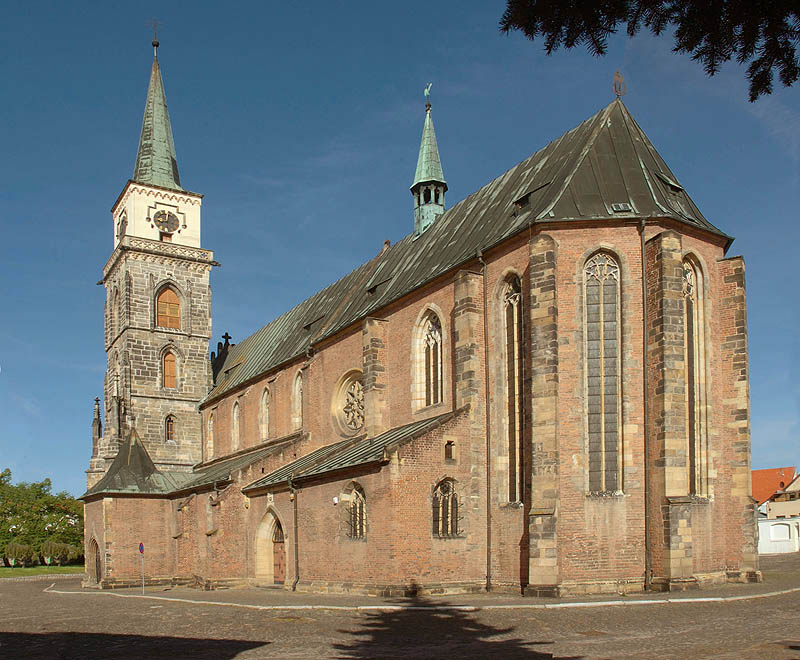
South-eastern view at the presbytery

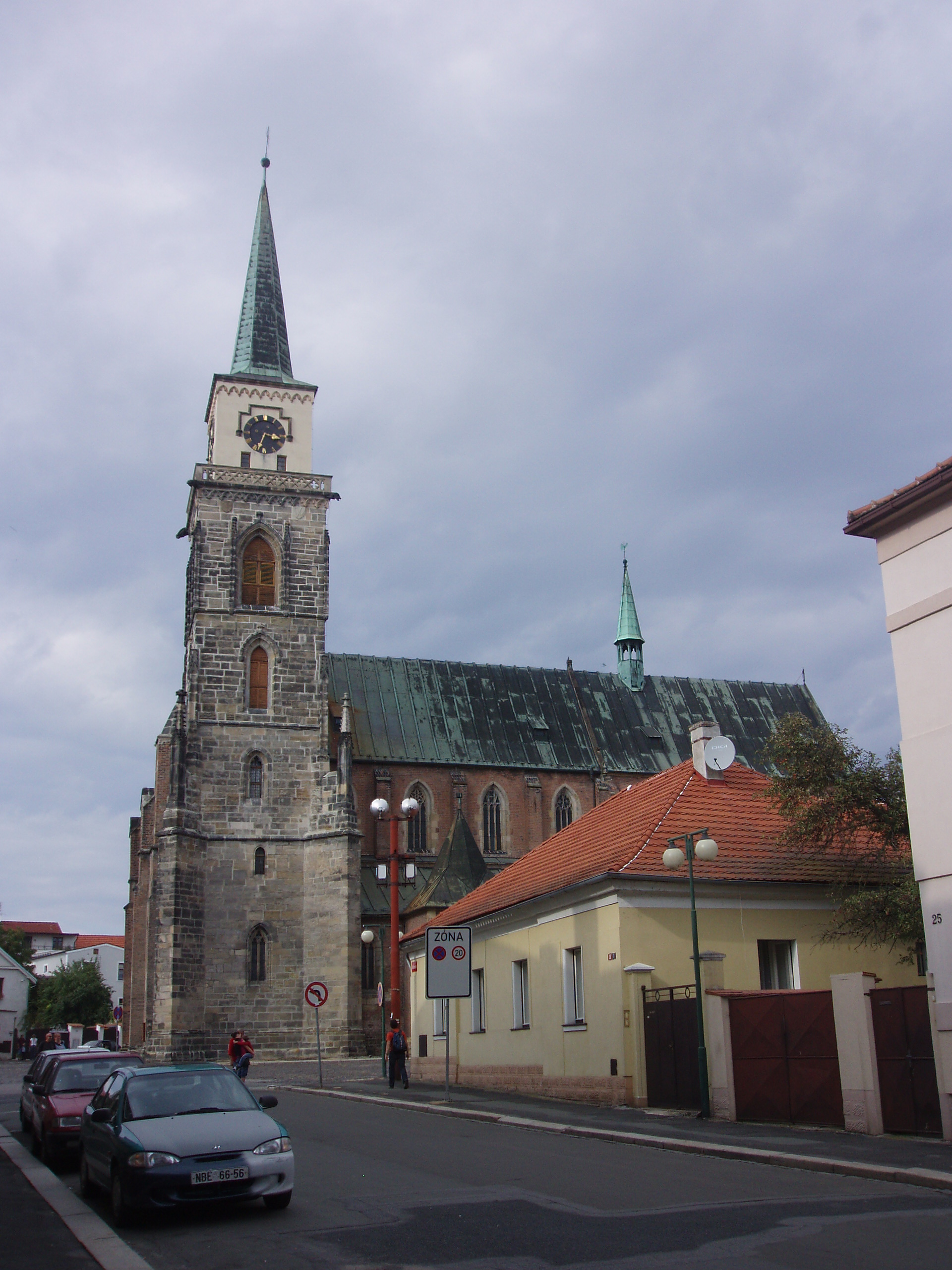
View from the south

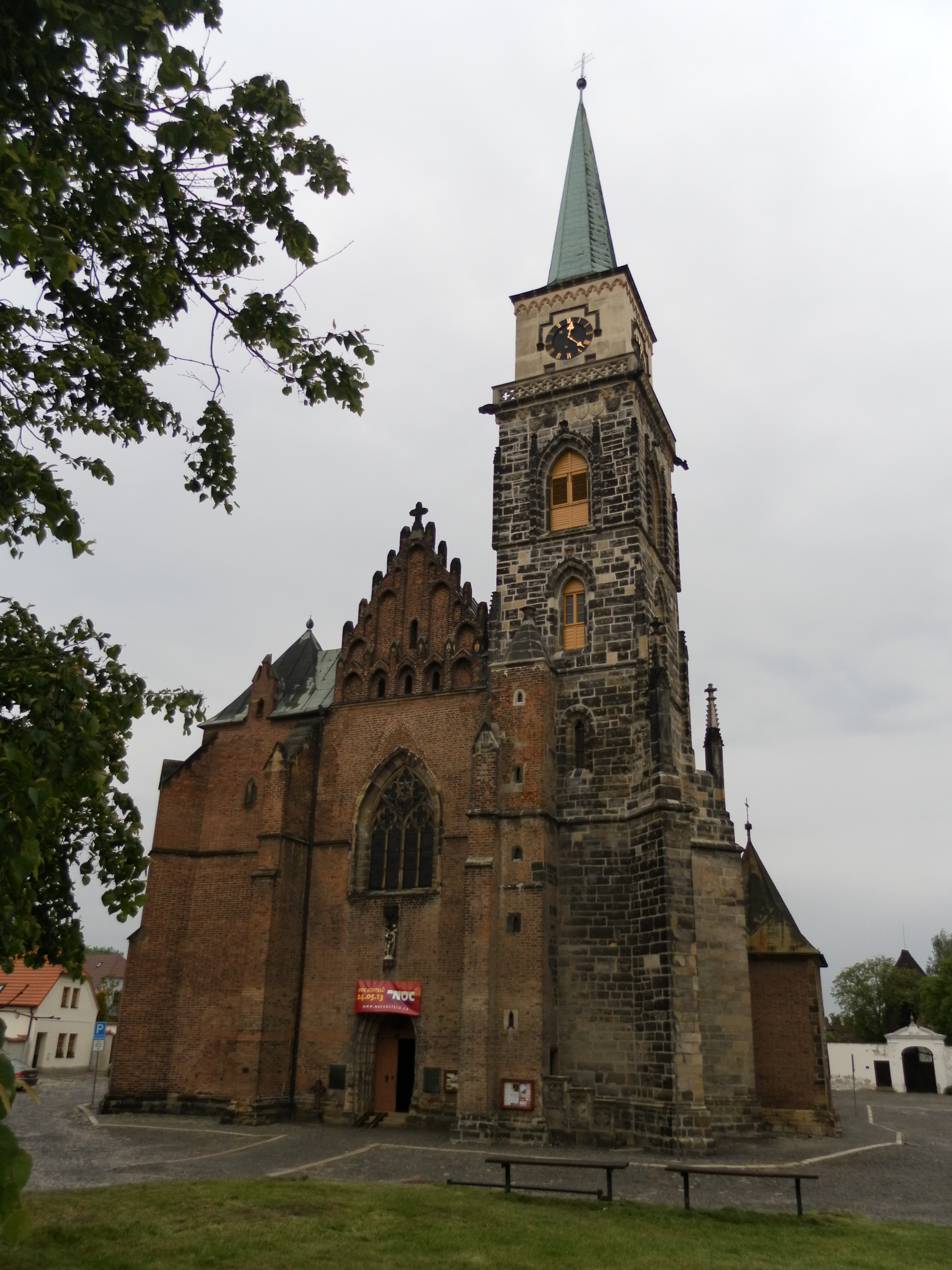
The western front face

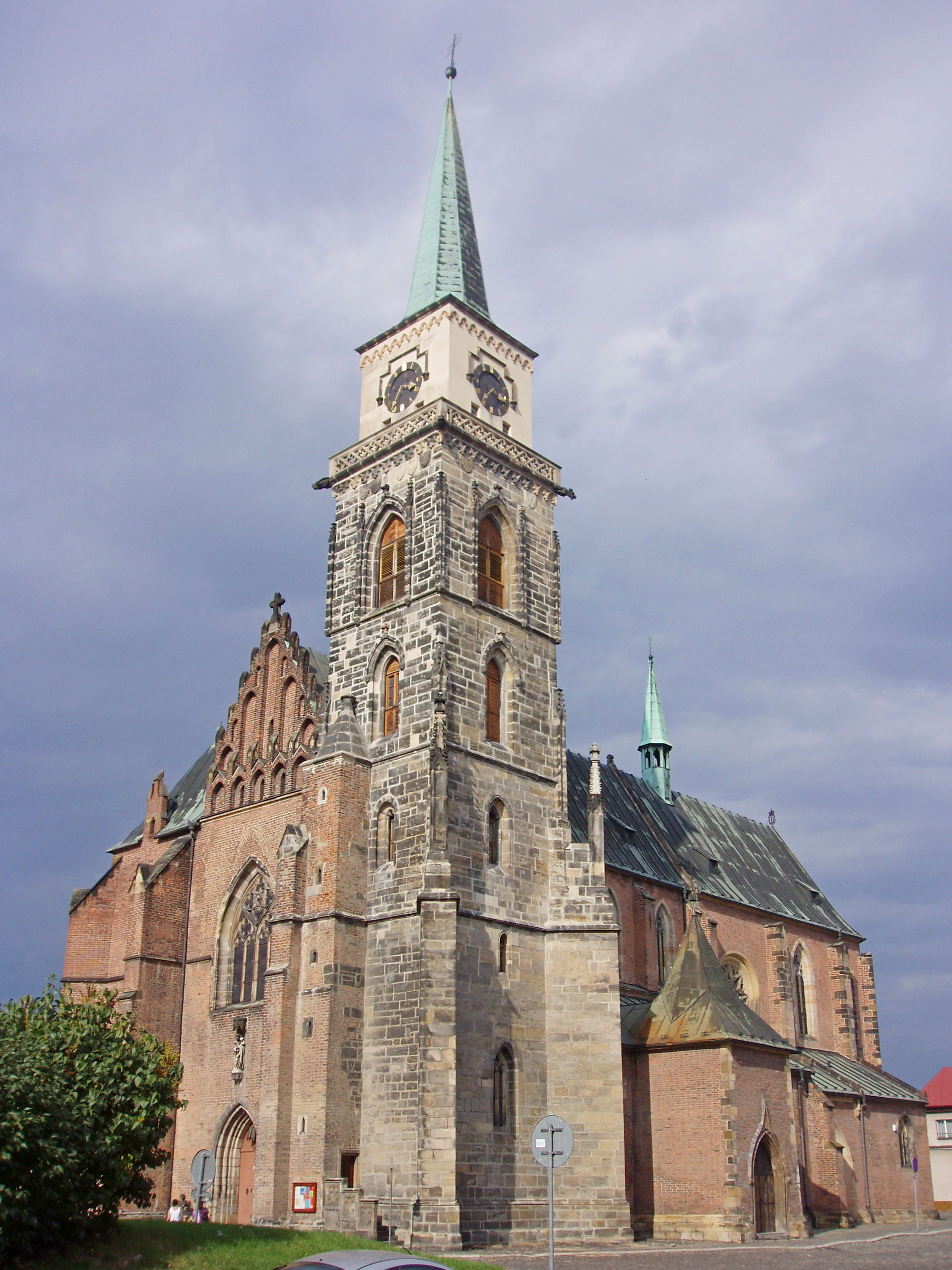
The western front face

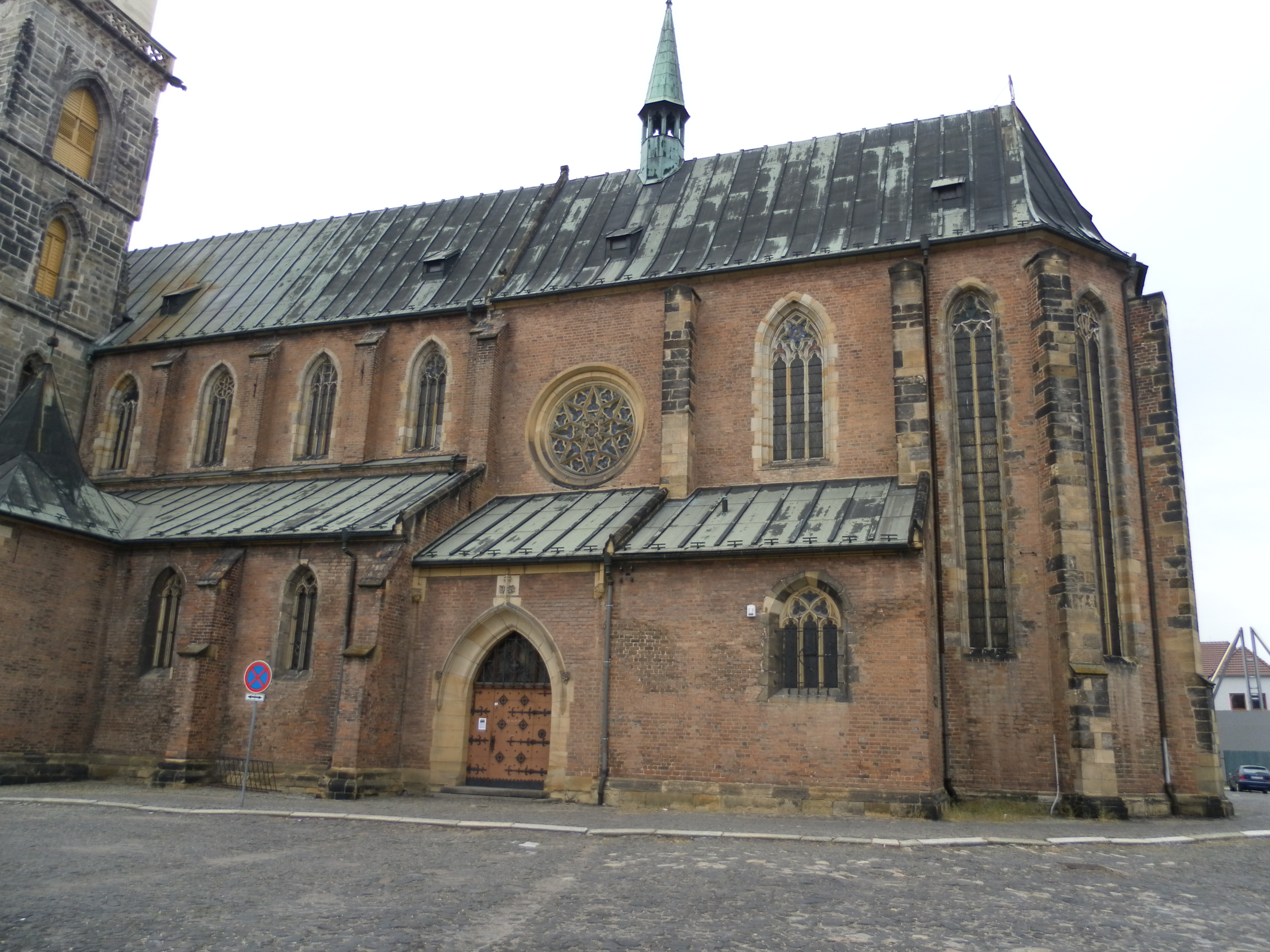
Presbytery from the south

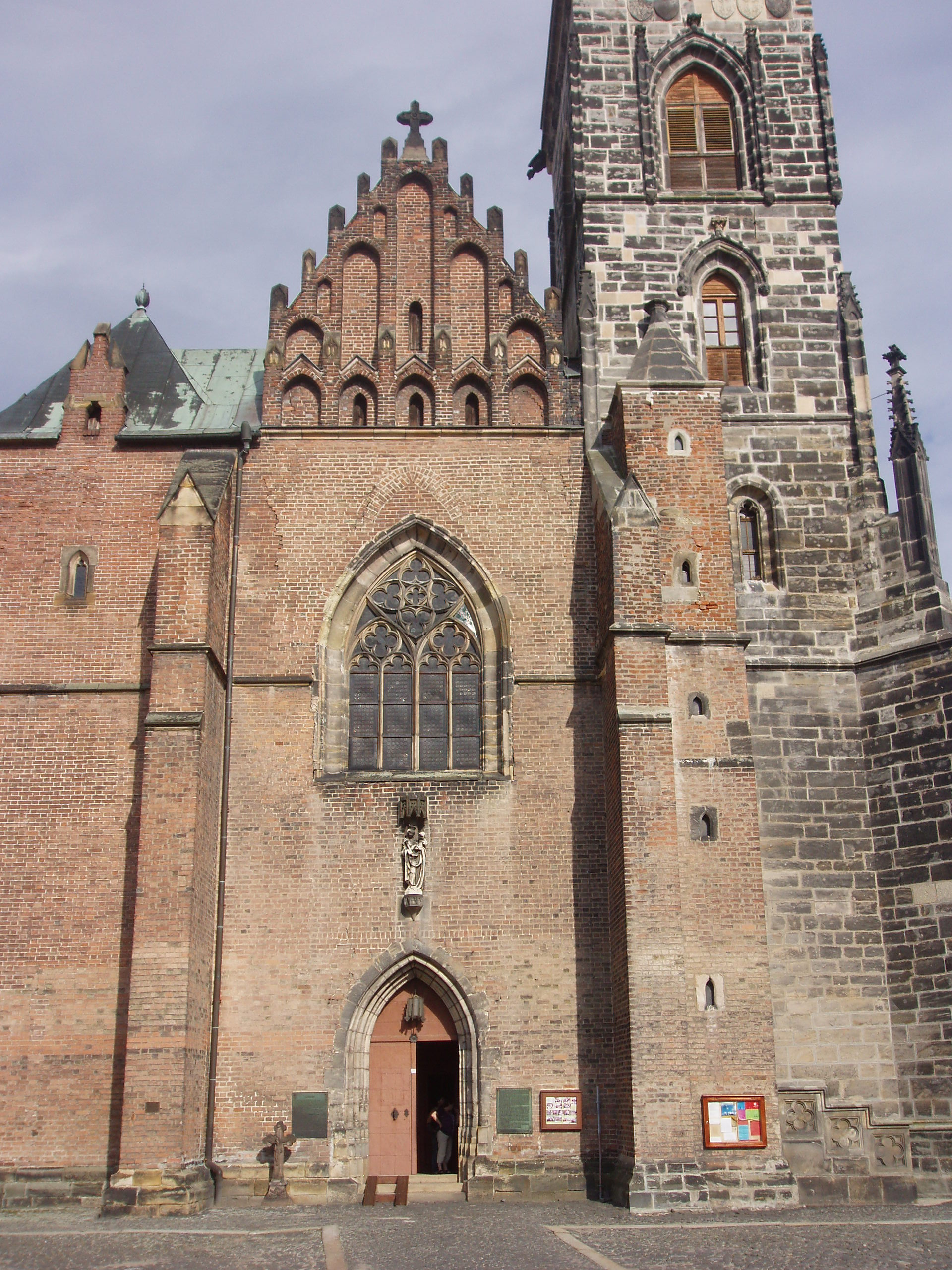
Western front face

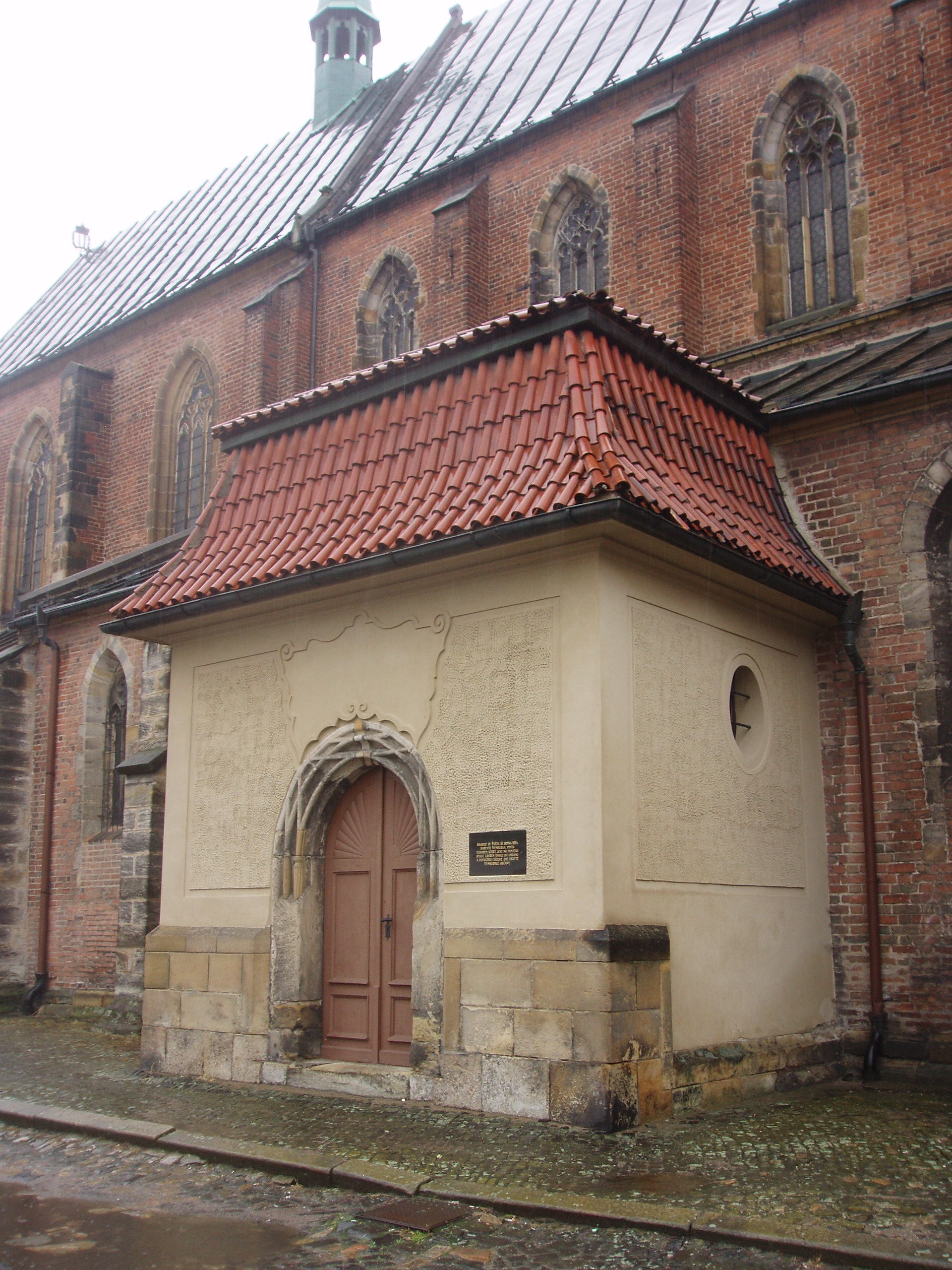
The northern porch of a side vessel

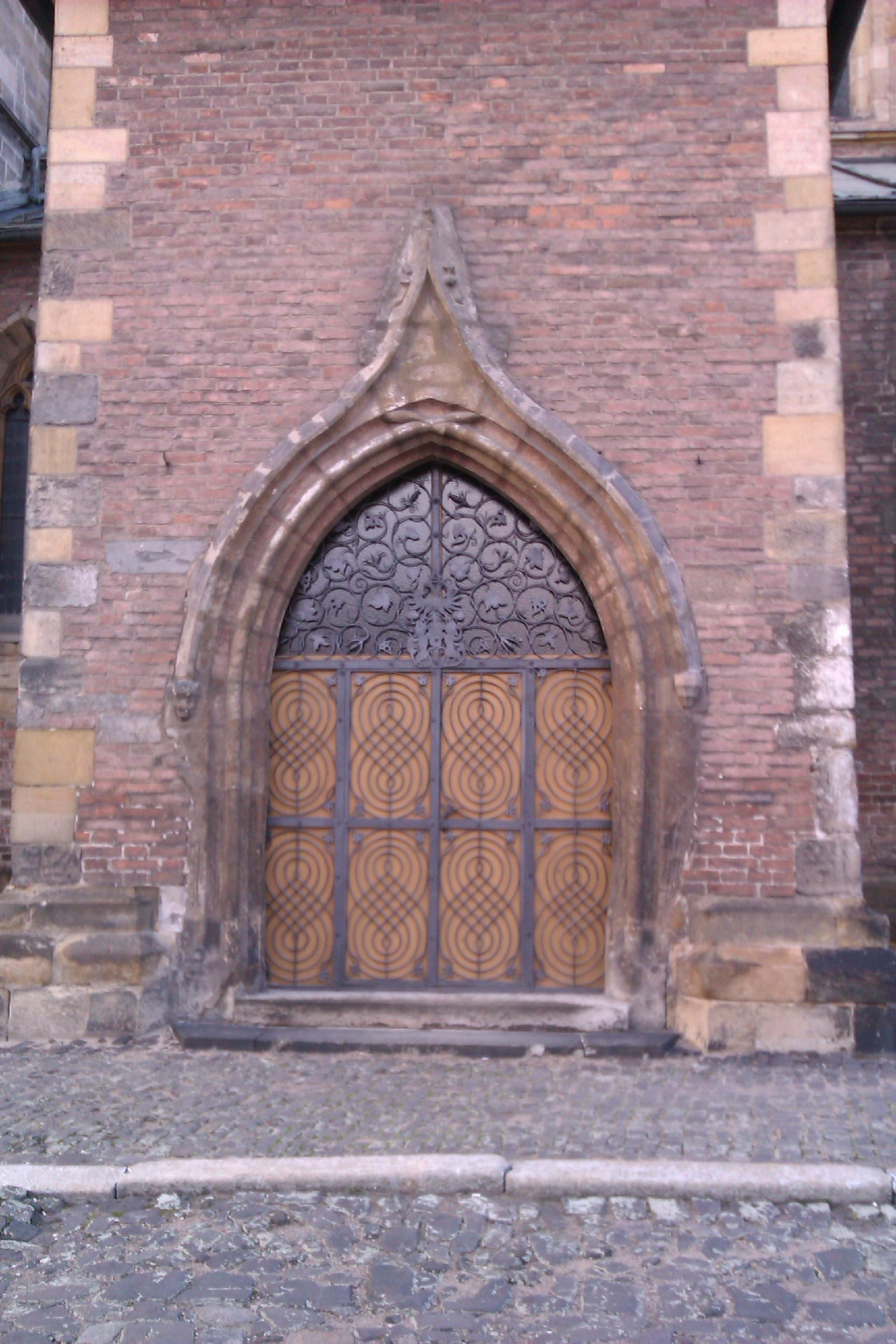
The late-Gothic portal of the southern nave

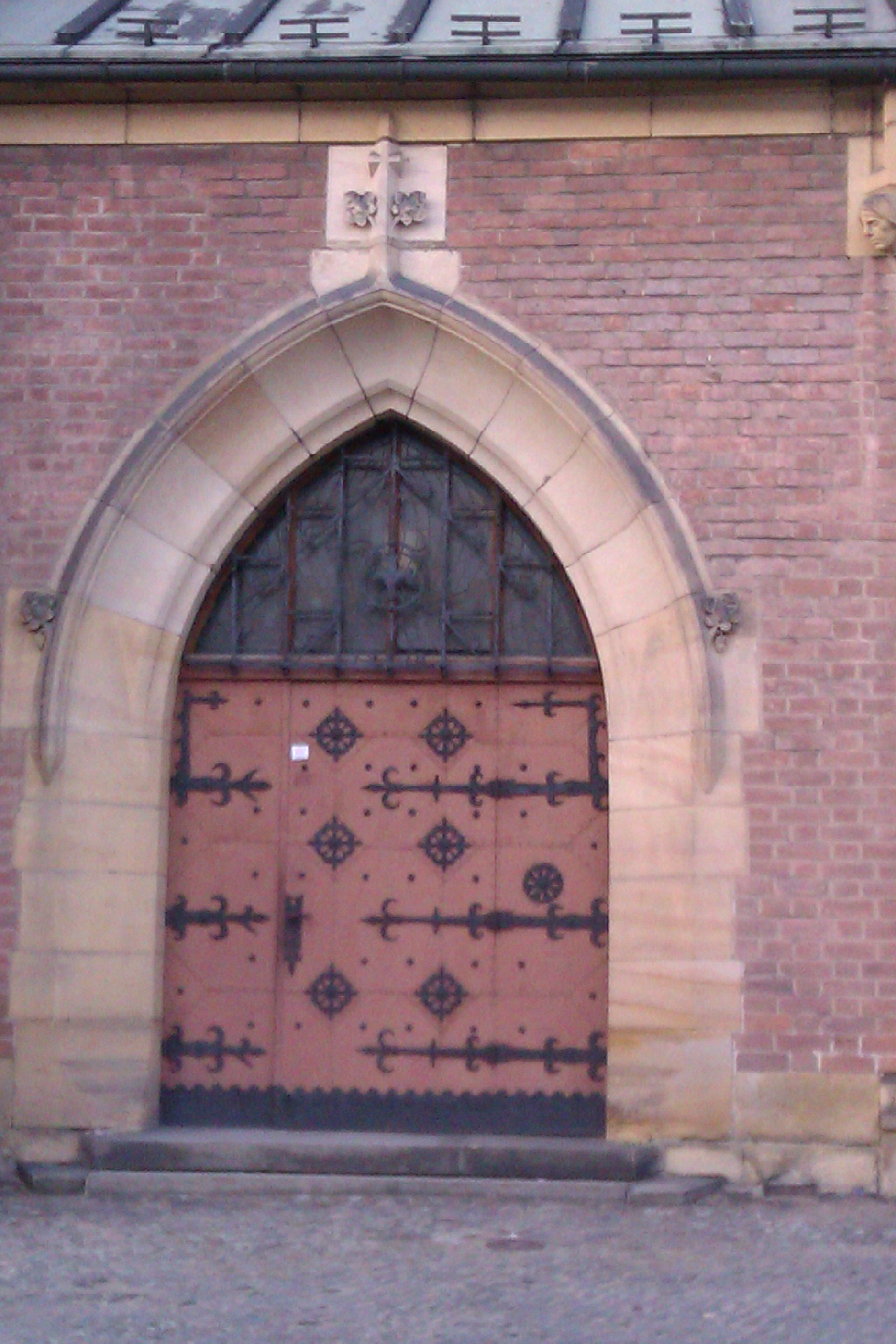
Simple late-Gothic portal to the south porch of the presbytery

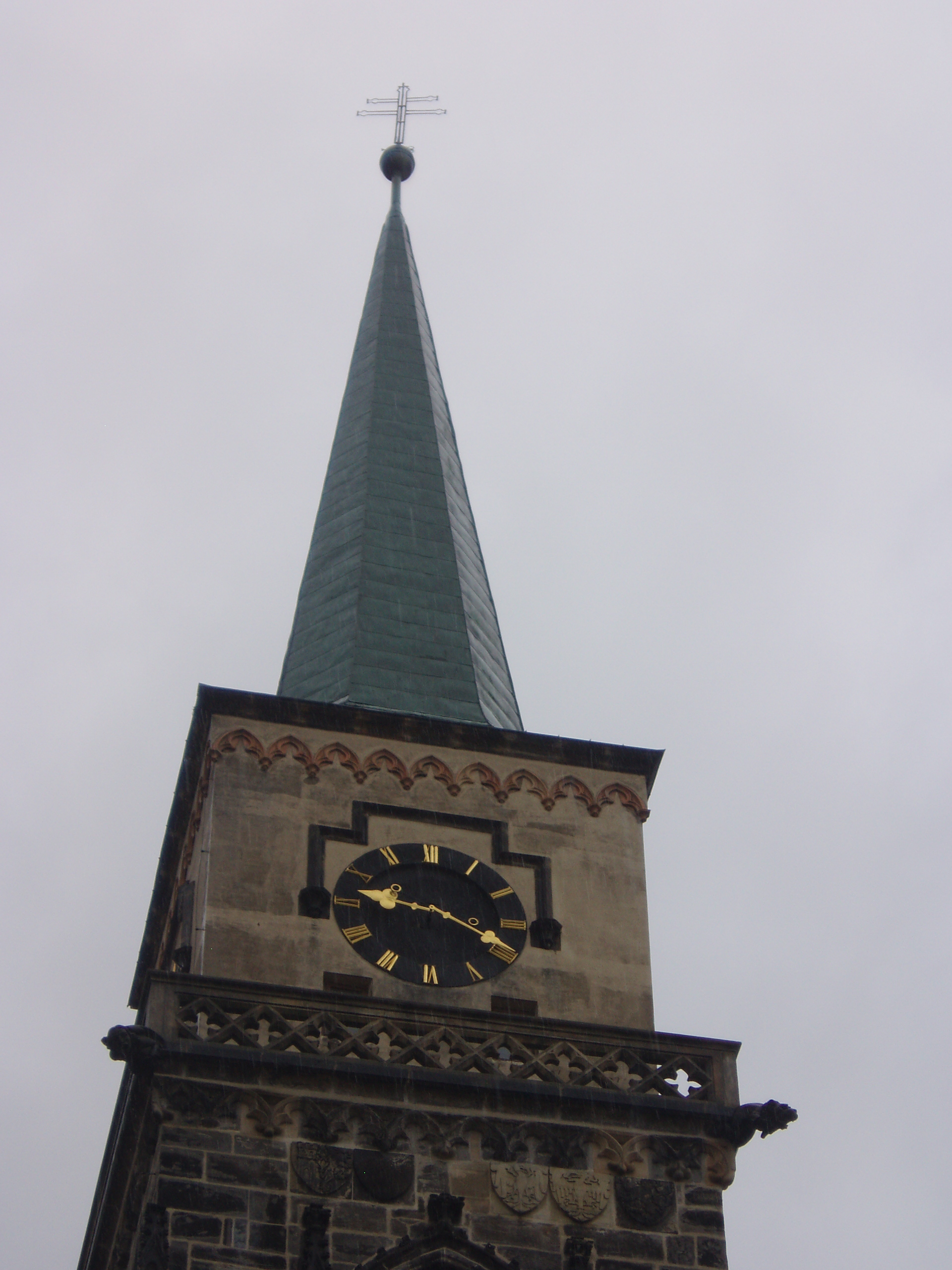
The tower of the church

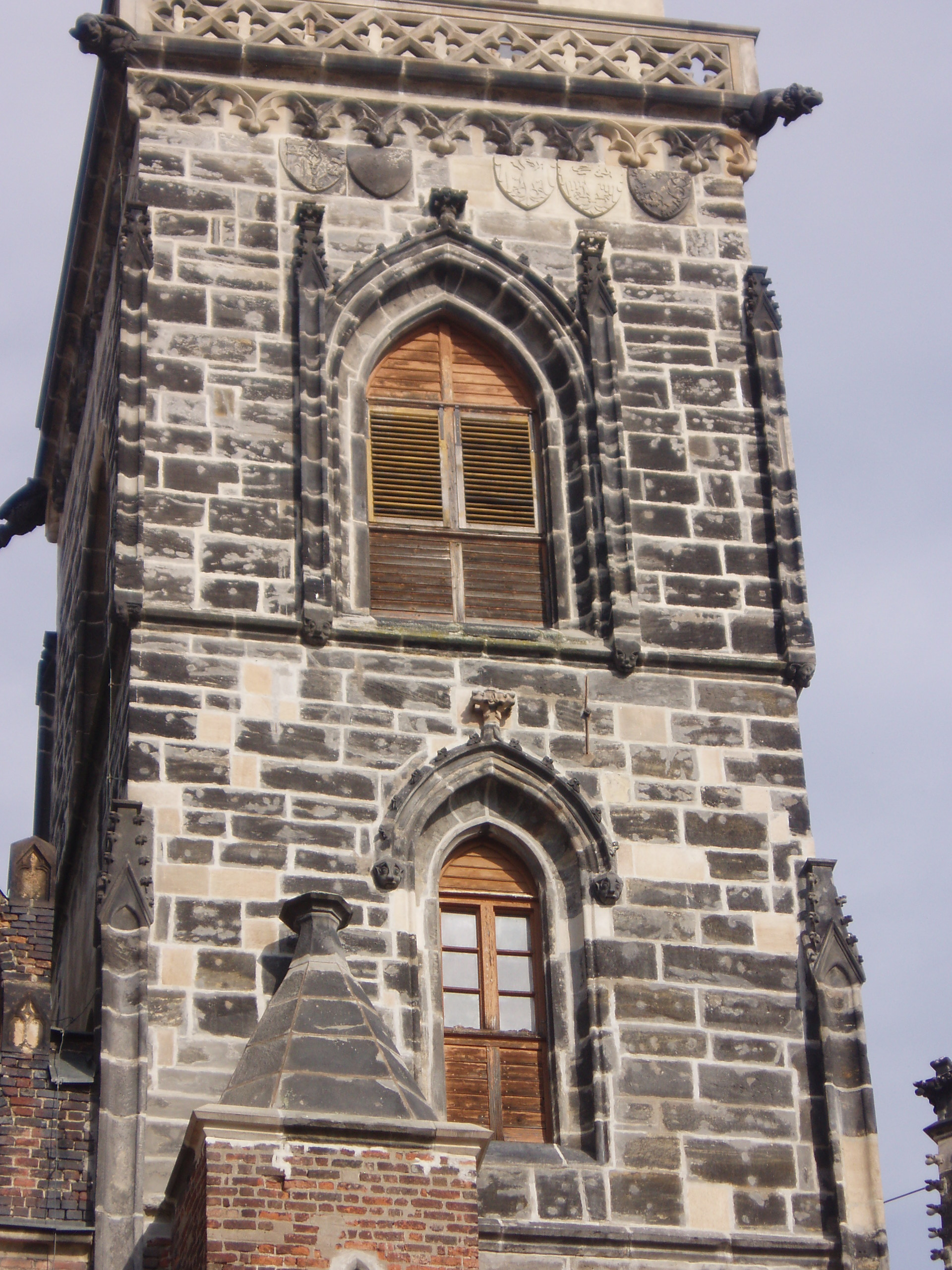
The tower with the balustrade and coats of arms

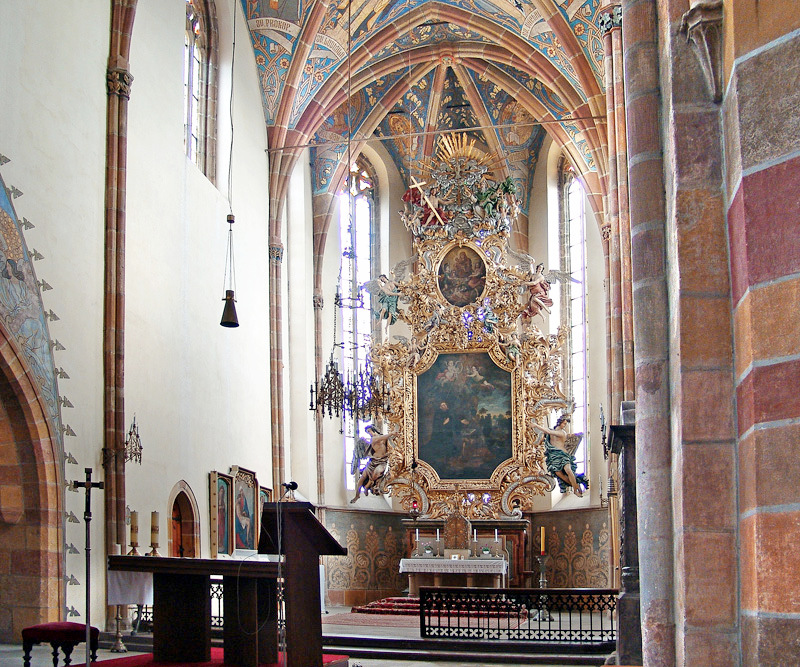
Altar

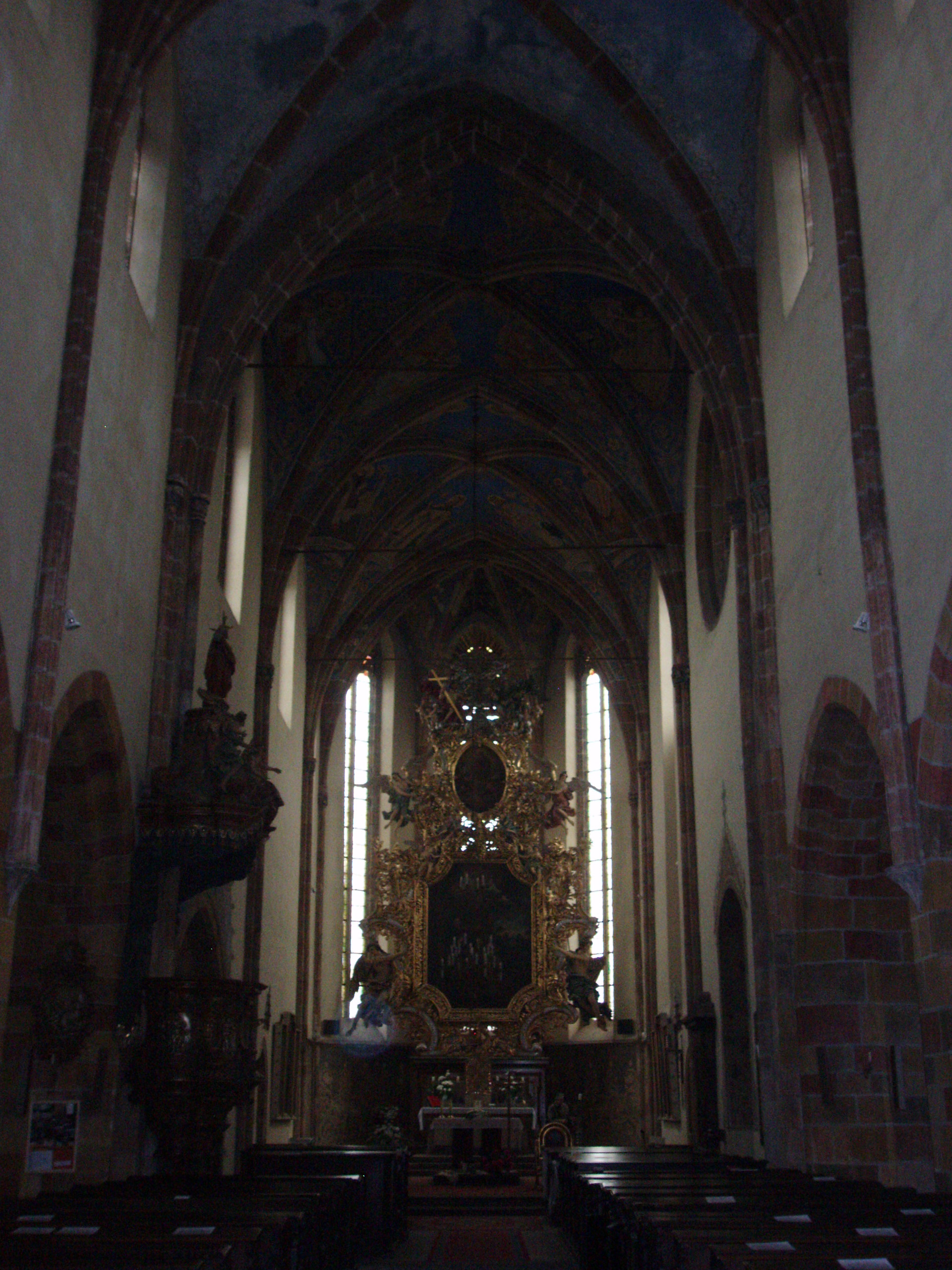
Interior of the church

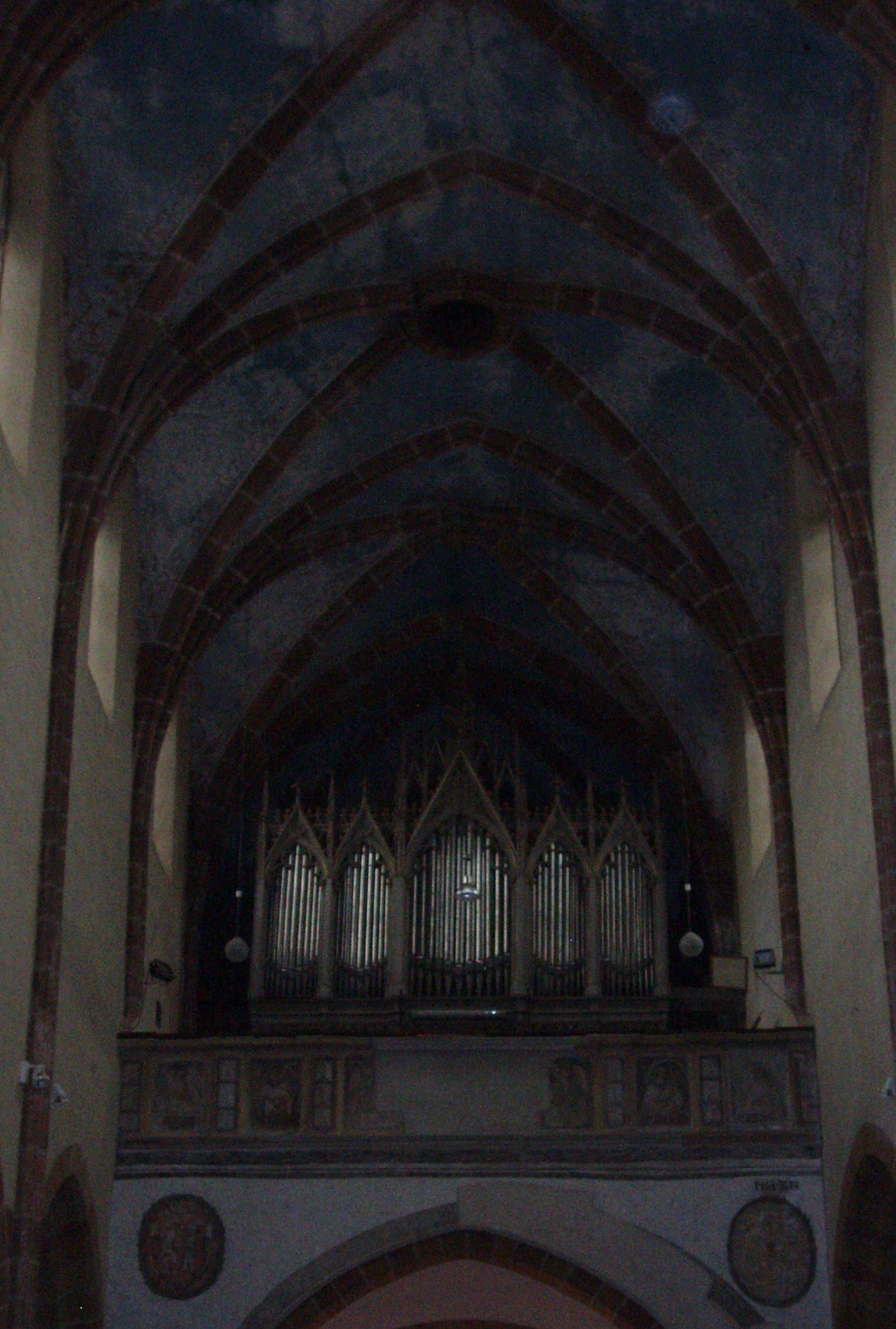
View to the organ

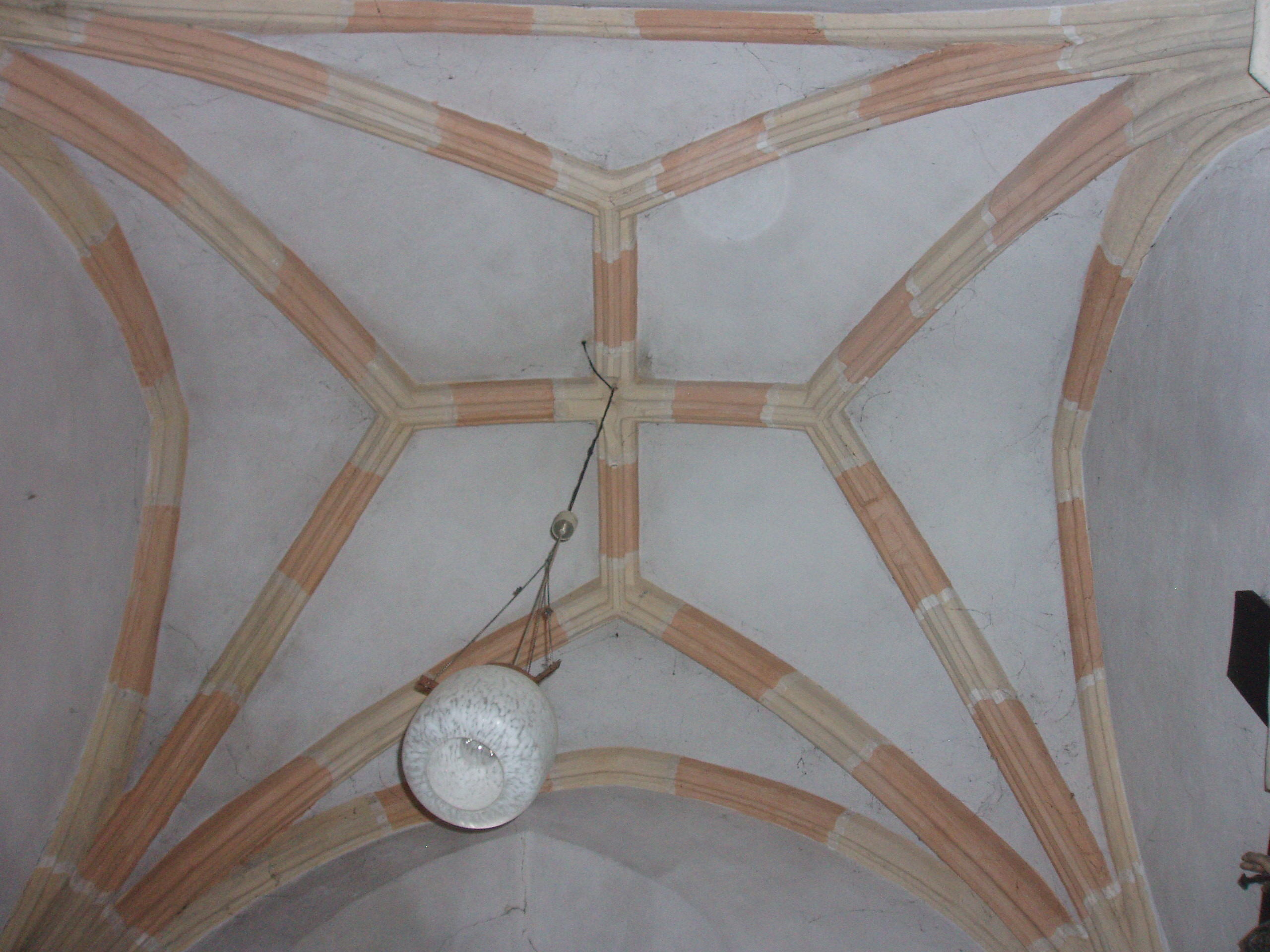
The star shaped vault under the southern tower

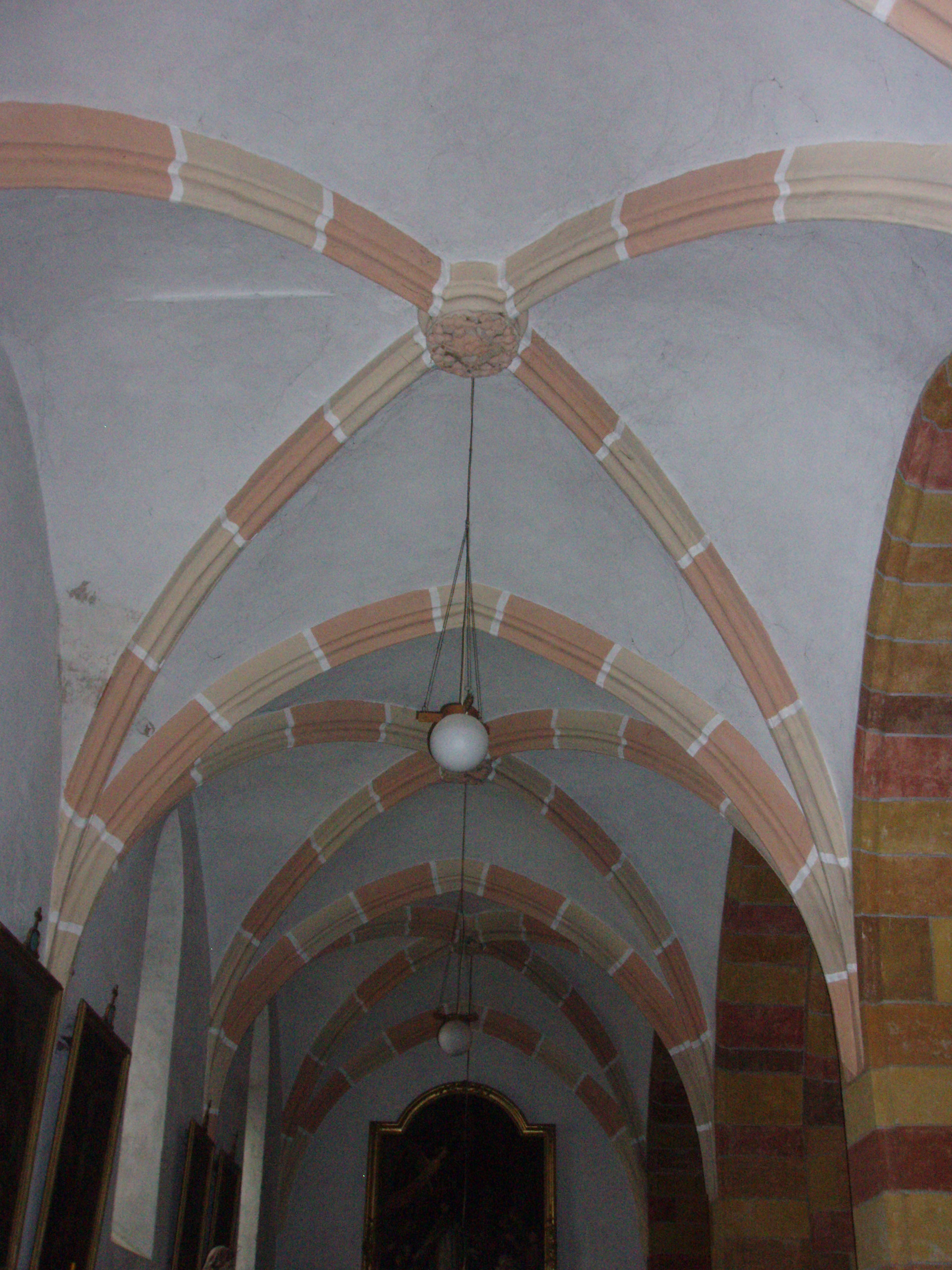
The vault of the side vessel

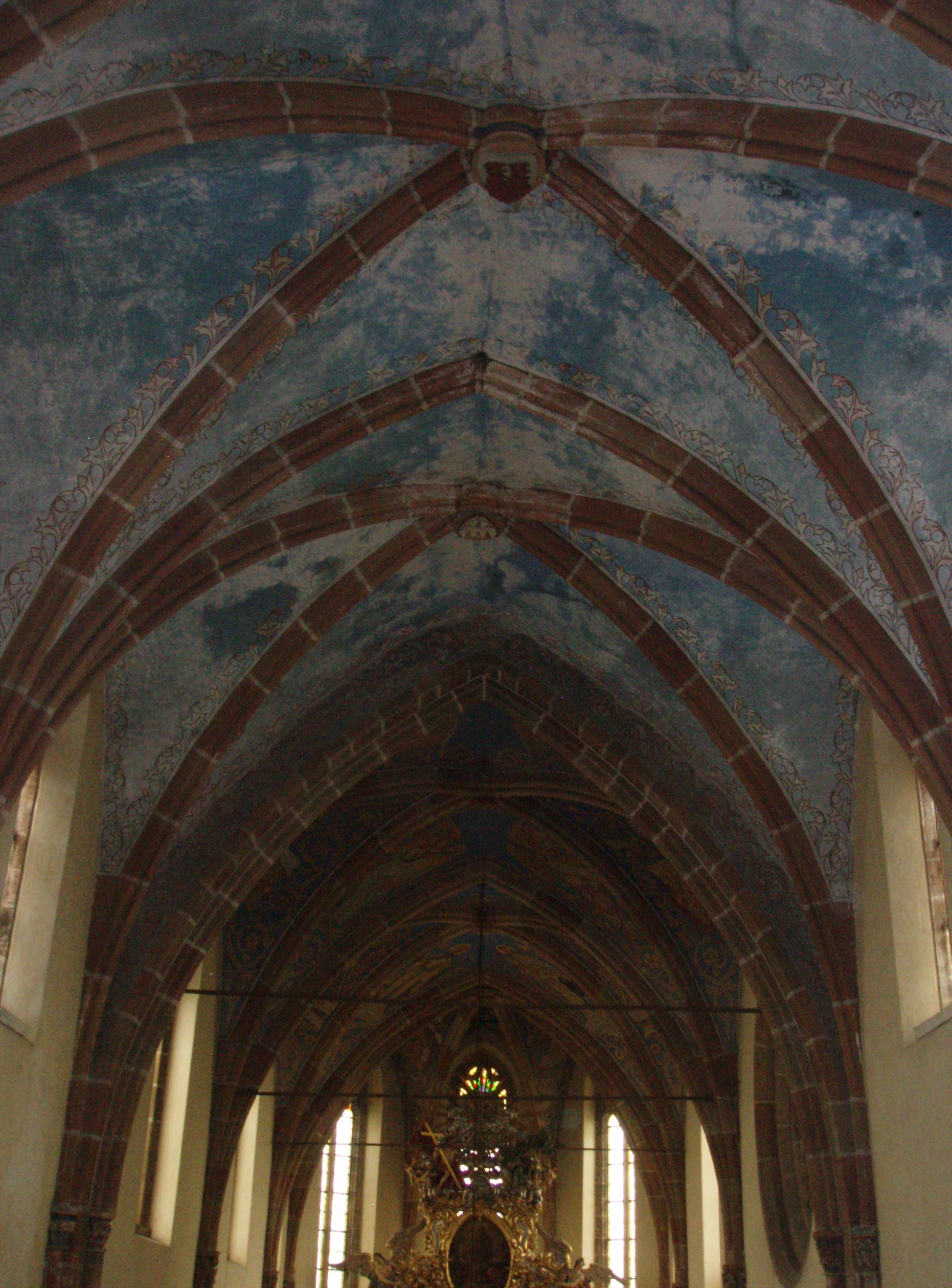
Ribbed vaults of the central nave

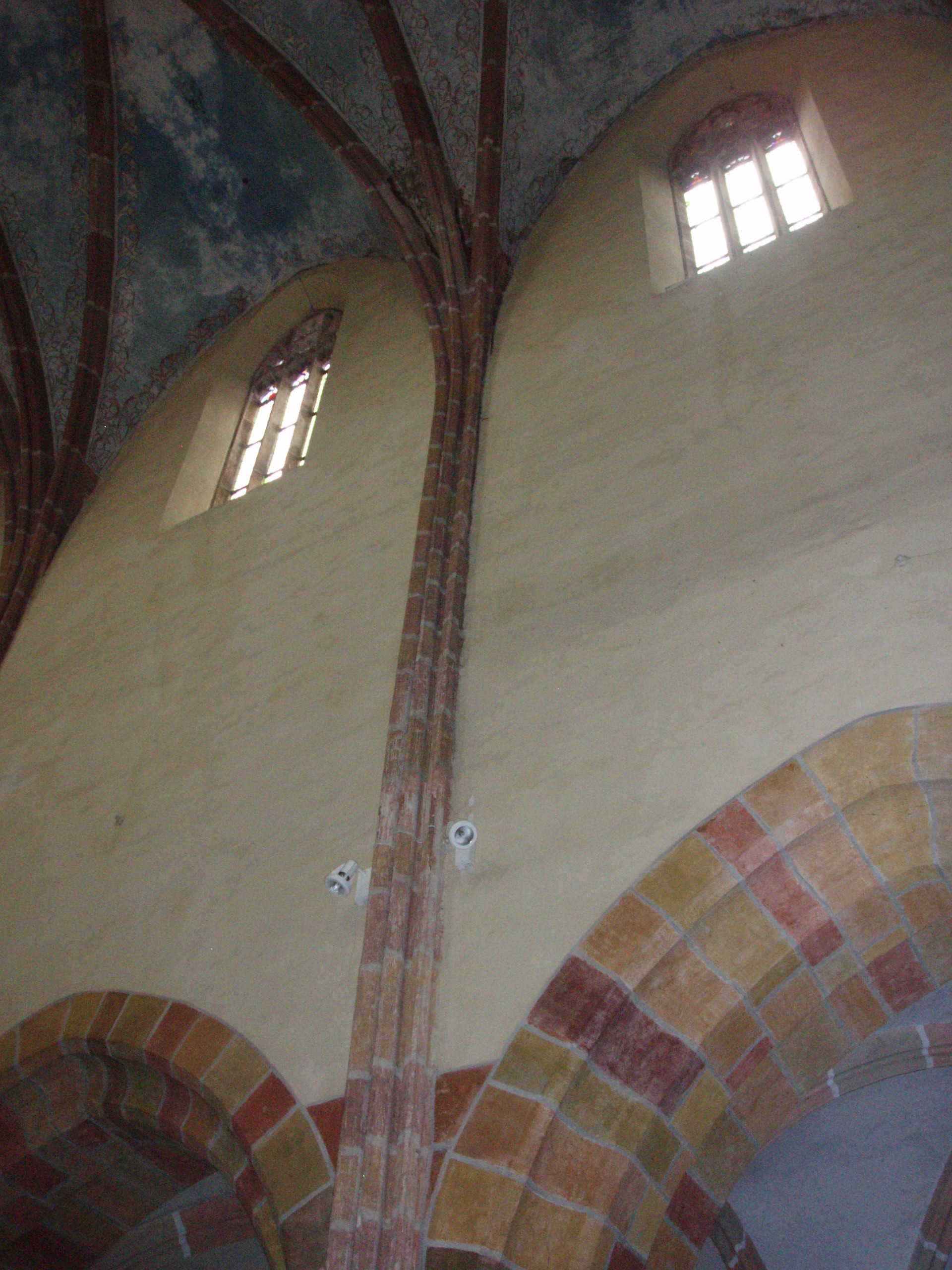
Shafts in the central nave

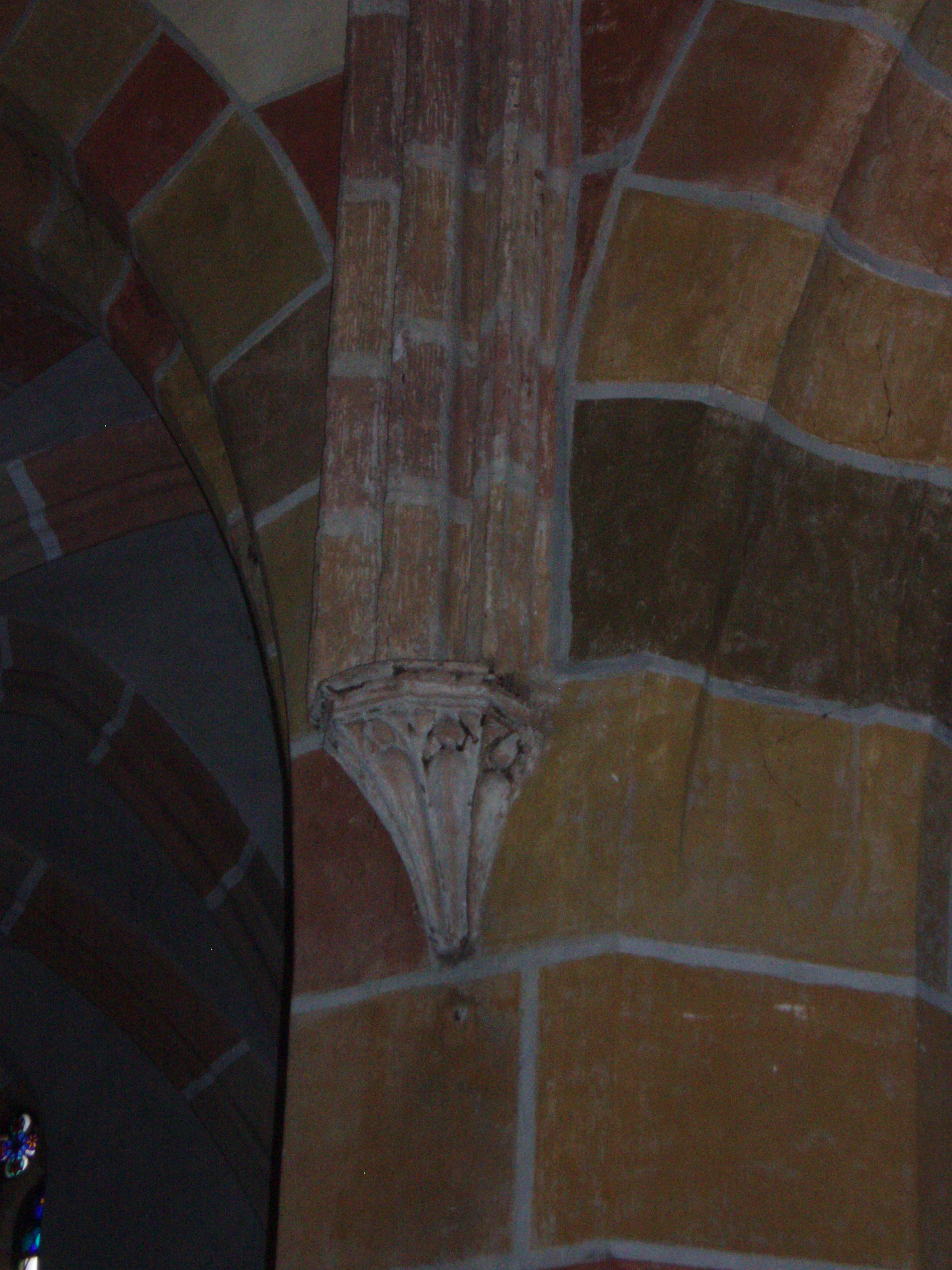
Corbel of the shaft

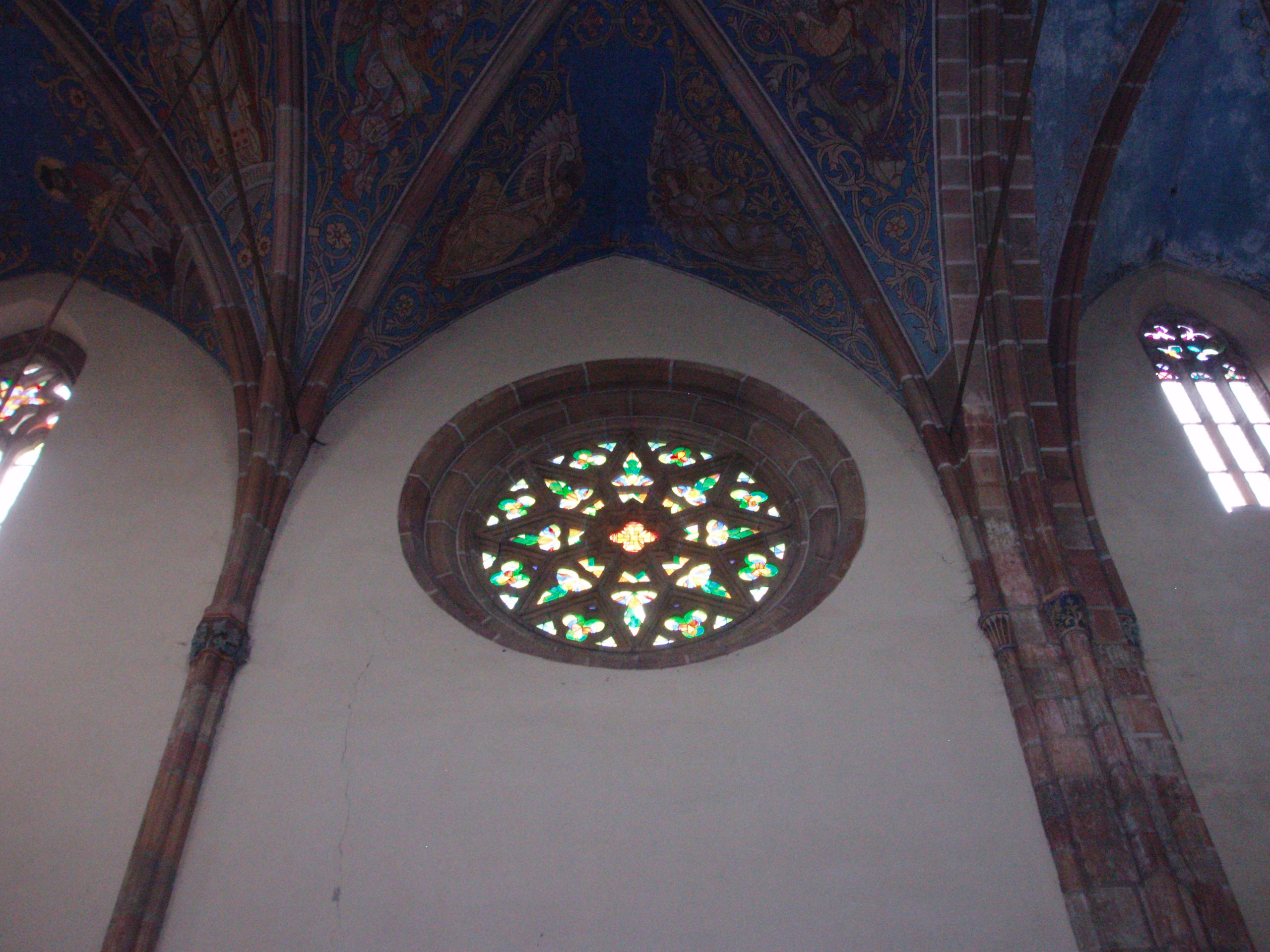
The Rosette

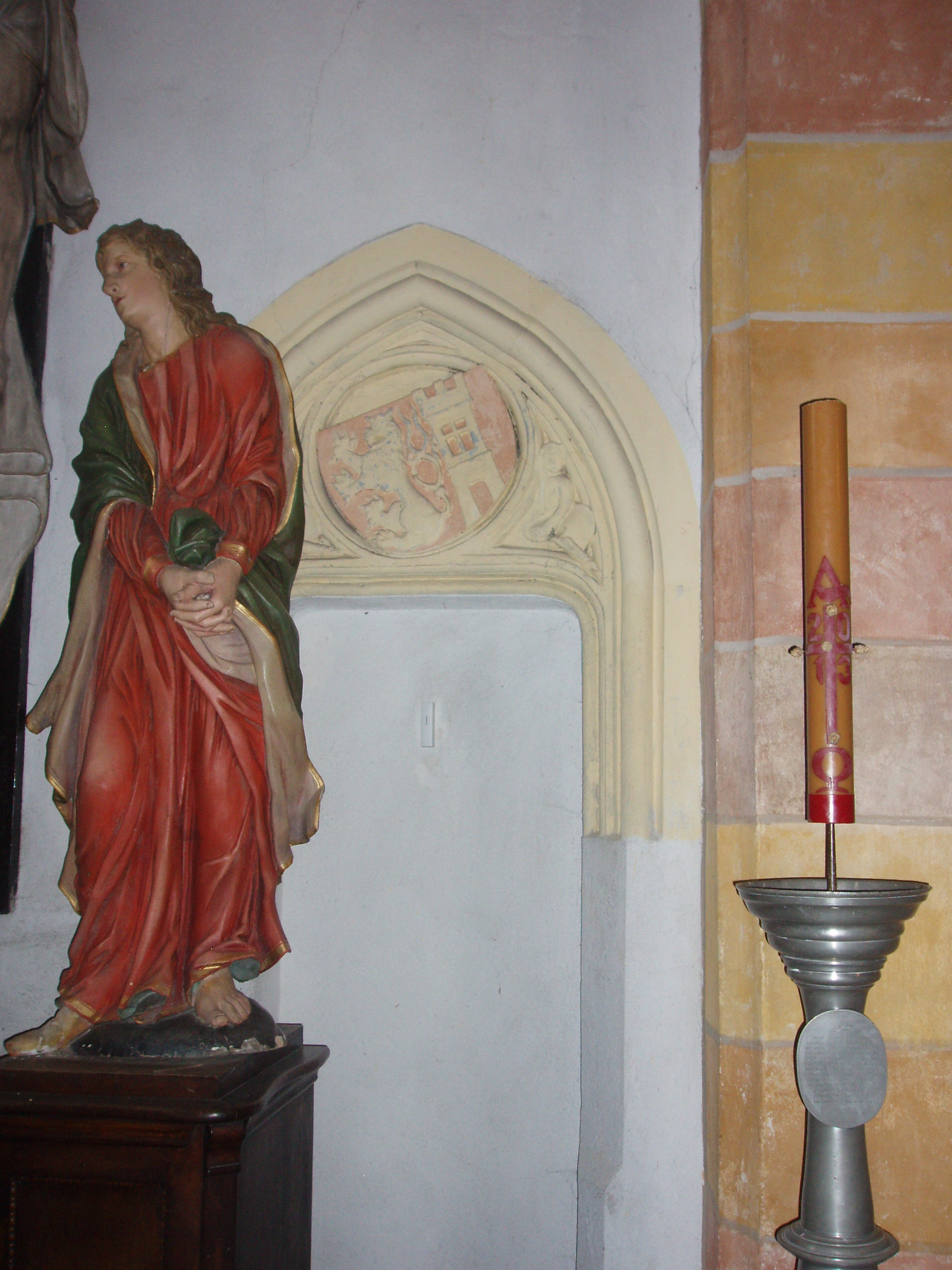
Cancelled portal with tympanum and Nymburk's coat of arms

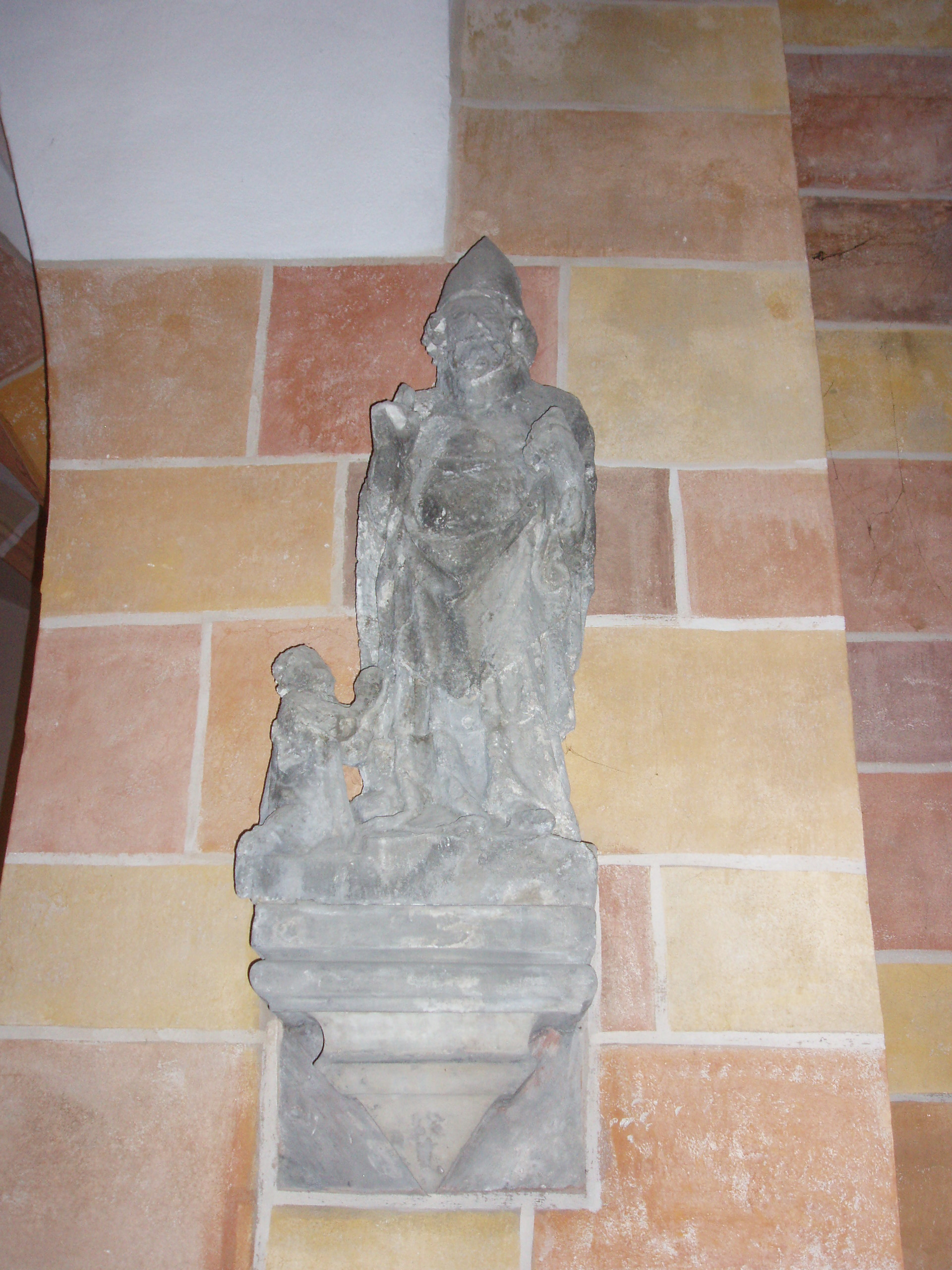
Sculpture of St. Nicholas

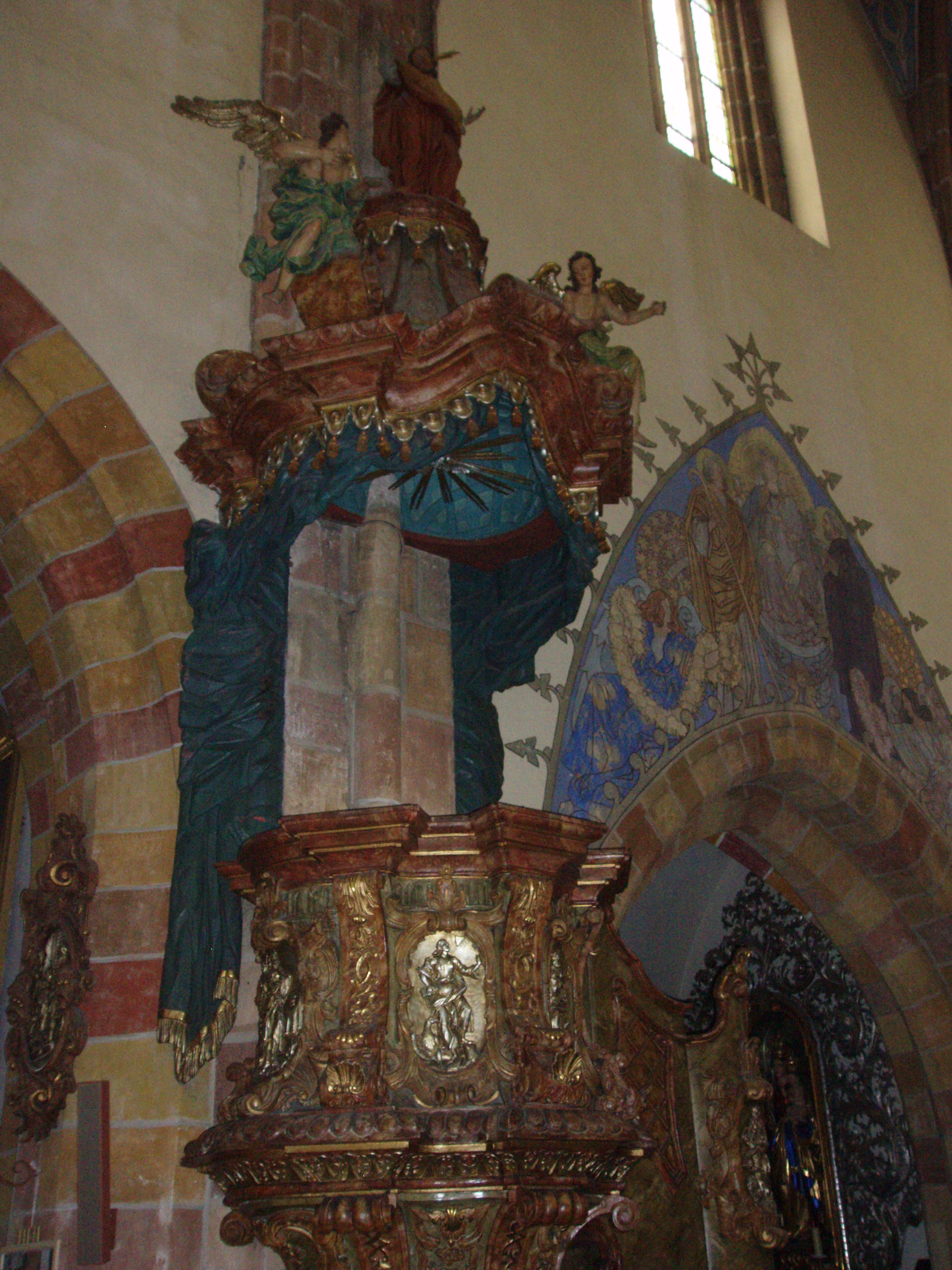
Baroque pulpit

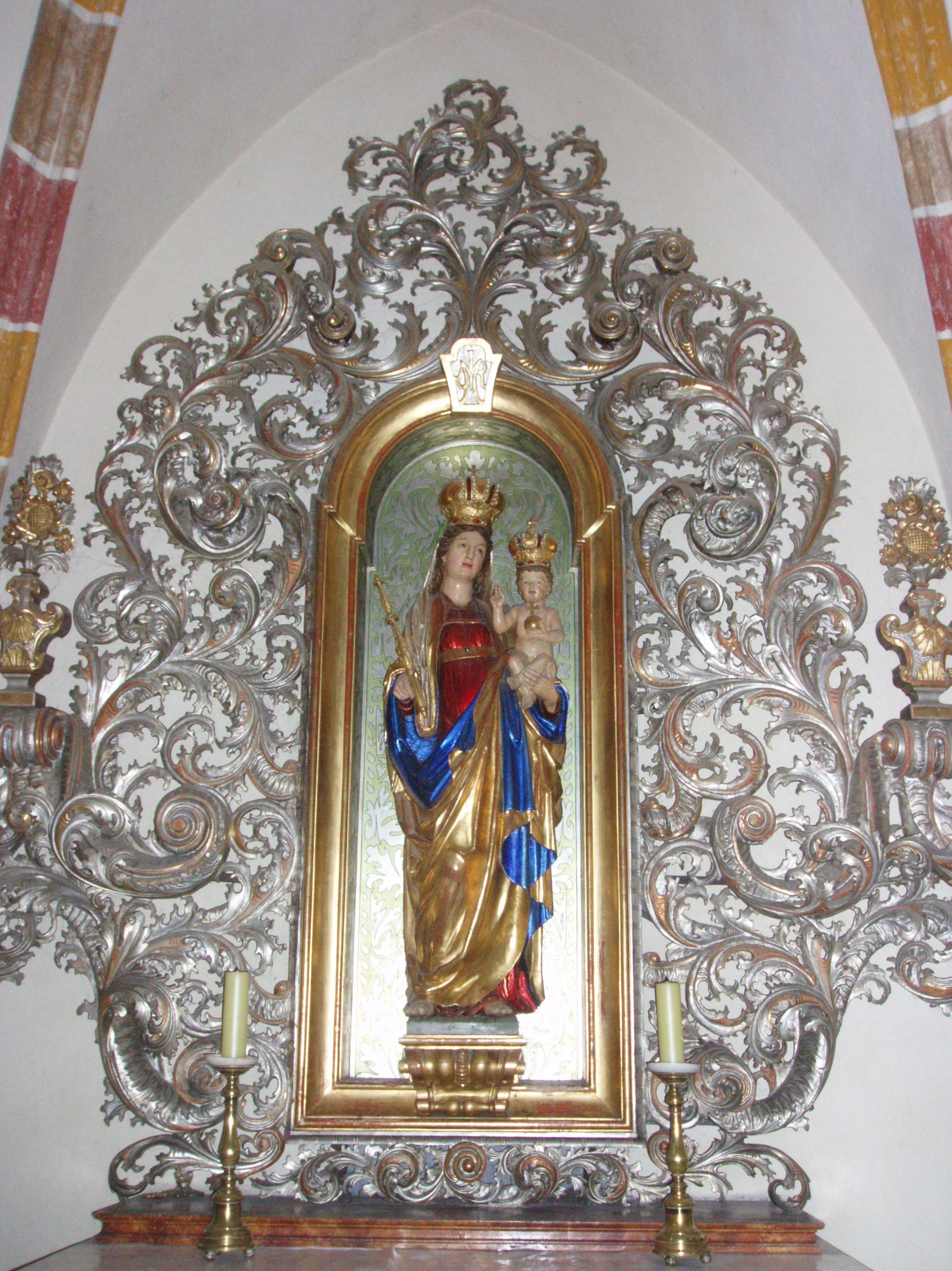
Altar of the Virgin Mary of Vienna

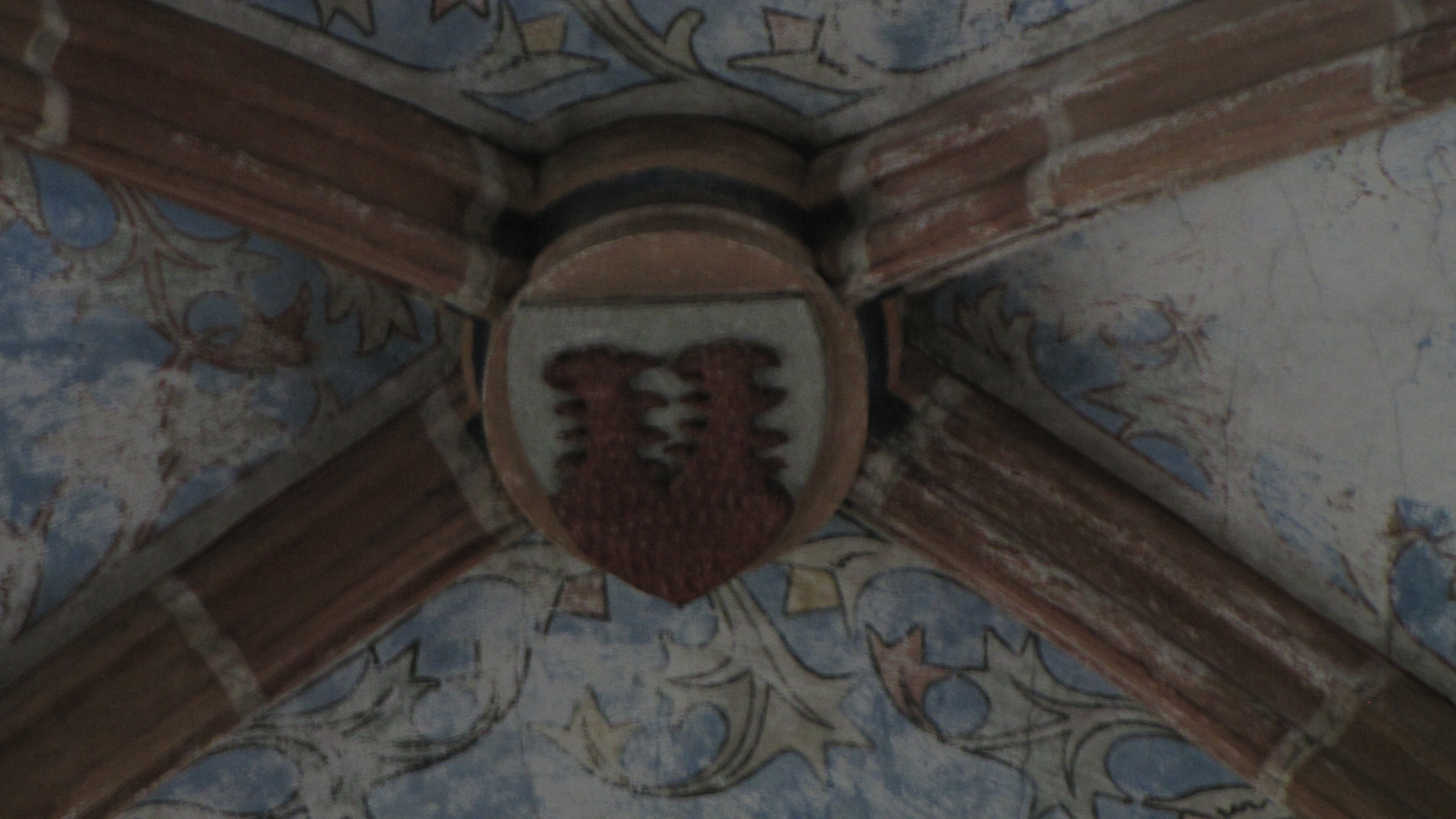
Keystone with a sign of Jan Očko from Vlašim

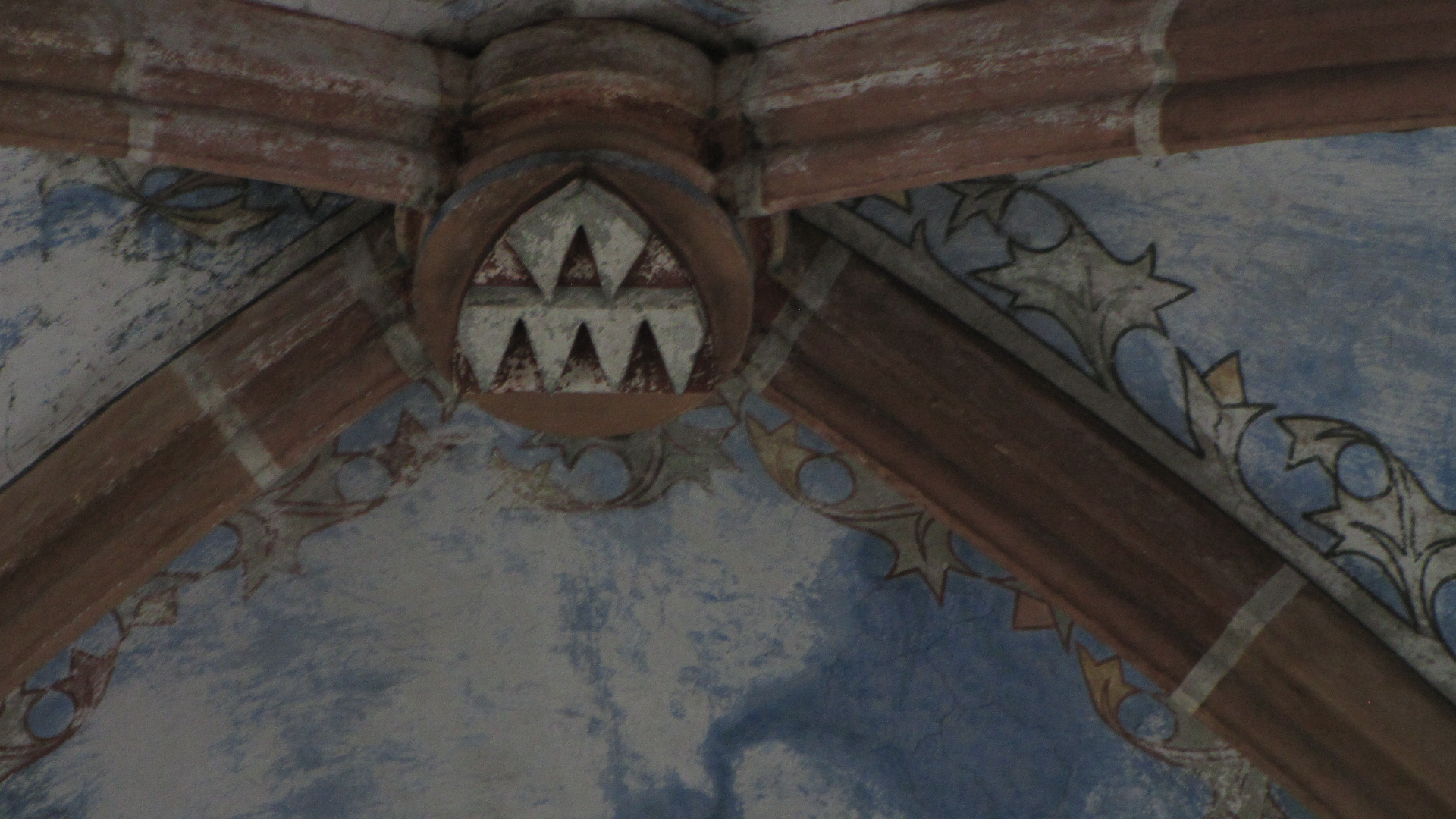
Keystone with a sign of archbishopric of Olomouc

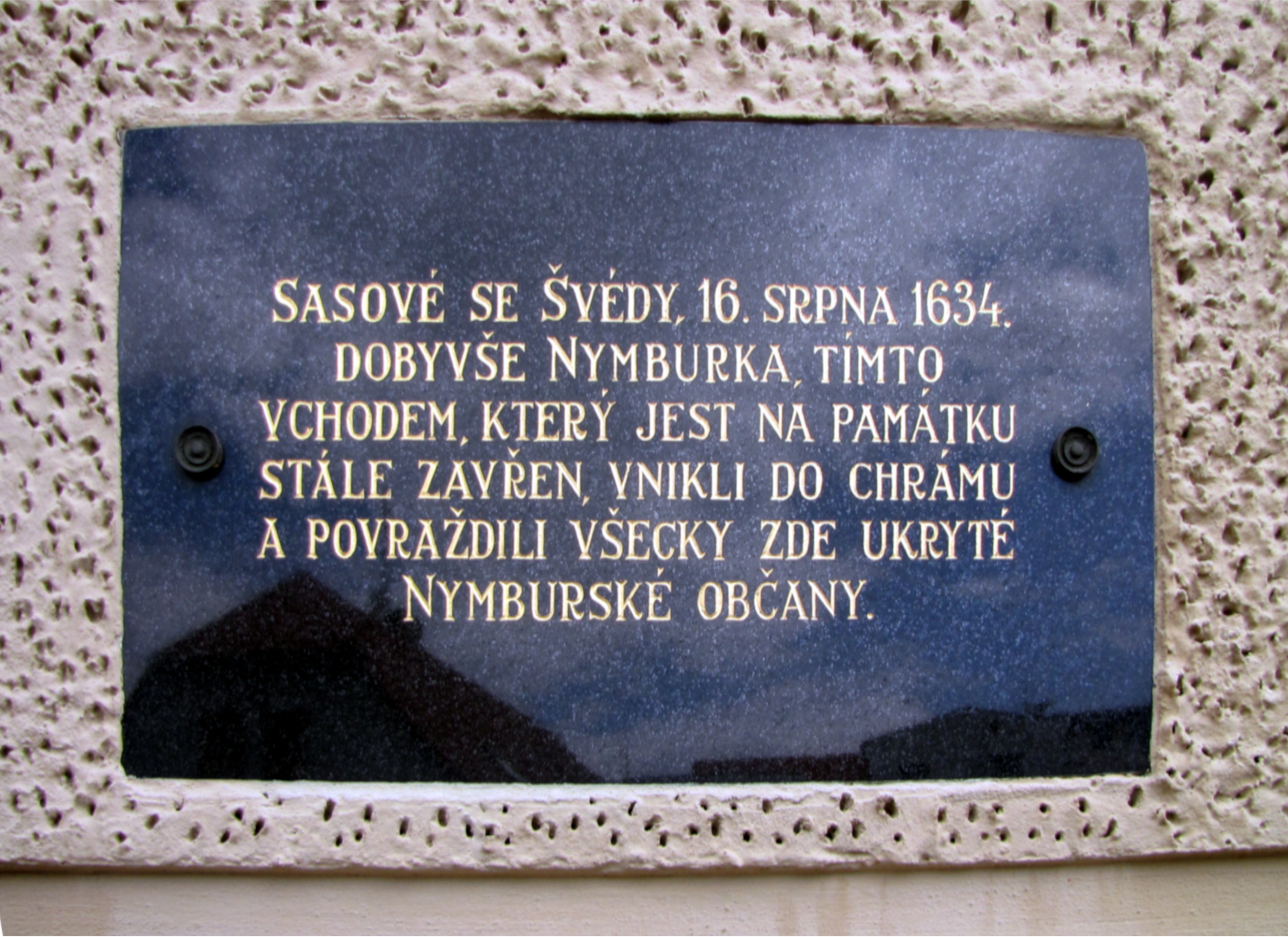
Memorial to the victims during Thirty Years' War
