= Artuš Scheiner =

Czech illustrator (1863–1938)

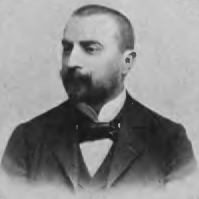
Artuš Scheiner in 1899

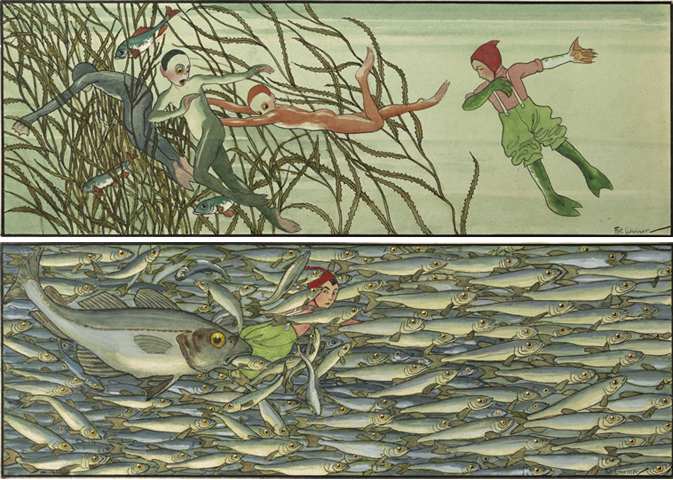
Artuš Scheiner for Kulihrášek v hlubinách mořských / Kulihrášek in the Depths of the Sea (1932)

Artuš Scheiner (28 October 1863 – 20 December 1938) was a Czech painter, decorative artist and illustrator. He was known best for his precise gouache drawing, mostly in secessional style. He produced many paintings, illustrations, advertisements, postcards and designs.

== Biography ==
Scheiner was born in Benešov on 28 October 1863. He was not classically trained in art. He began painting as a child and became passionate about art during high school. He originally worked as financial clerk at the Financial General in Prague.

Scheiner began his career with drawings in Lustige Blätter, a weekly German humour magazine published in Berlin, and other magazines in Germany, Austria and Hungary. From 1880, his drawings were published in humorous Czech periodical magazines such as Světozor (from 1897), Paleček, Švanda dudák, and Zlatá Praha. He gradually built a reputation as a talented artist-humorist with a focus on the situational humour of everyday life. In 1902, now freelance, he illustrated his first book, a children's fairy tale Růženka a Bobeš by Václav Říha. His black and white pen and ink line drawings in secessionist style gained him popularity and new contracts. He illustrated fairy-tale books from well-known authors such as Božena Němcová's The Disobedient Kids and other Czechoslovak Fairy Tales, Karel Jaromír Erben, Hans Christian Andersen and others. In 1928, in the Romance about the faithful friendship of Amis and Amil by Julius Zeyer, his work also included soft erotic drawings. These books were also published in expensive high-quality graphic versions to emphasise the drawings.

He illustrated the Kulihrášek series, a series of comic books for children written by Marta Voleská.

In 1930, he illustrated Podivuhodné příběhy barona Prášila by Adolf Wenig. In 1933, the original fairy-tale illustrations were exhibited in the Prague Central Library for the first time.

Scheiner died 20 December 1938 in Prague, aged 75.

== Other works ==
His work included children's books, classic novels, advertising postcards, posters and even theatrical curtains. In 1895 he designed a puppet theatre for the children of his brother Josef Scheiner, who served as mayor of Sokol Prague, handcarving the wooden puppets in a completely new secession style. In the 1920s, his style led to cooperation with a puppet troupe in Prague. His stage curtain designs were used for line production in 1932 by the J. R. Vilímek Publishing House as complete set for small home theatres that were fashionable in the period.

From 1911 to 1913 Scheiner's two oil paintings – Virgin Mary and child, Crucifixion on wood were on display at the Church of Saint John of Nepomuk in Štěchovice, Czech Republic.

== Libraries database ==
- National Library of the Czech Republic
- National Museum Library CR / both illustrated books and original illustrations

== Exhibitions and online collections ==
- 2001 – "Water babies", Princeton University, Cotsen Children's Library, Princeton, New Jersey, USA
- 2006/2007 – Artuš Scheiner a secesní pohádková ilustrace (Artuš Scheiner & secession fairy tale illustration), Galerie výtvarného umění (Fine Arts Gallery), Cheb, Czech Republic
- 2010/2011 – Staré pověsti české (Ancient Bohemian Legends), Národní muzeum ČR (National Museum), Prague, Czech Republic
- 2013 – Svět pohádek a příběhů (World of fairy tales and legends), Muzeum výtvarného umění (Fine Arts Gallery), Náchod, Czech Republic
- online – Albertina Gallery, Vienna, Austria
