= Pleskot =

Pleskot (Czech feminine: Pleskotová) is a surname. Notable people with the surname include:

- Jaromír Pleskot (1922–2009), Czech director and screenwriter
- Jiří Pleskot (1922–1997), Czech actor
- Josef Pleskot (born 1952), Czech architect
