= Orangery (disambiguation) =

An orangery is a greenhouse where orange trees were protected during the winter.

Orangery or Orangerie may also refer to:

- Orangery (Royal Garden of Prague Castle), Czech Republic
- Musée de l'Orangerie, in the Tuileries Gardens of Paris, France
- Versailles Orangerie, at the Palace of Versailles, near Paris, France
- Orangerie (Darmstadt), Darmstadt, Germany
- Orangerie (Kassel), Kassel, Germany
- Orangerie (Ansbach), Ansbach, Germany
- Orangery Palace, in Sanssouci Park, Potsdam, Germany
