= Nicolò Pacassi =

Italian-Austrian architect

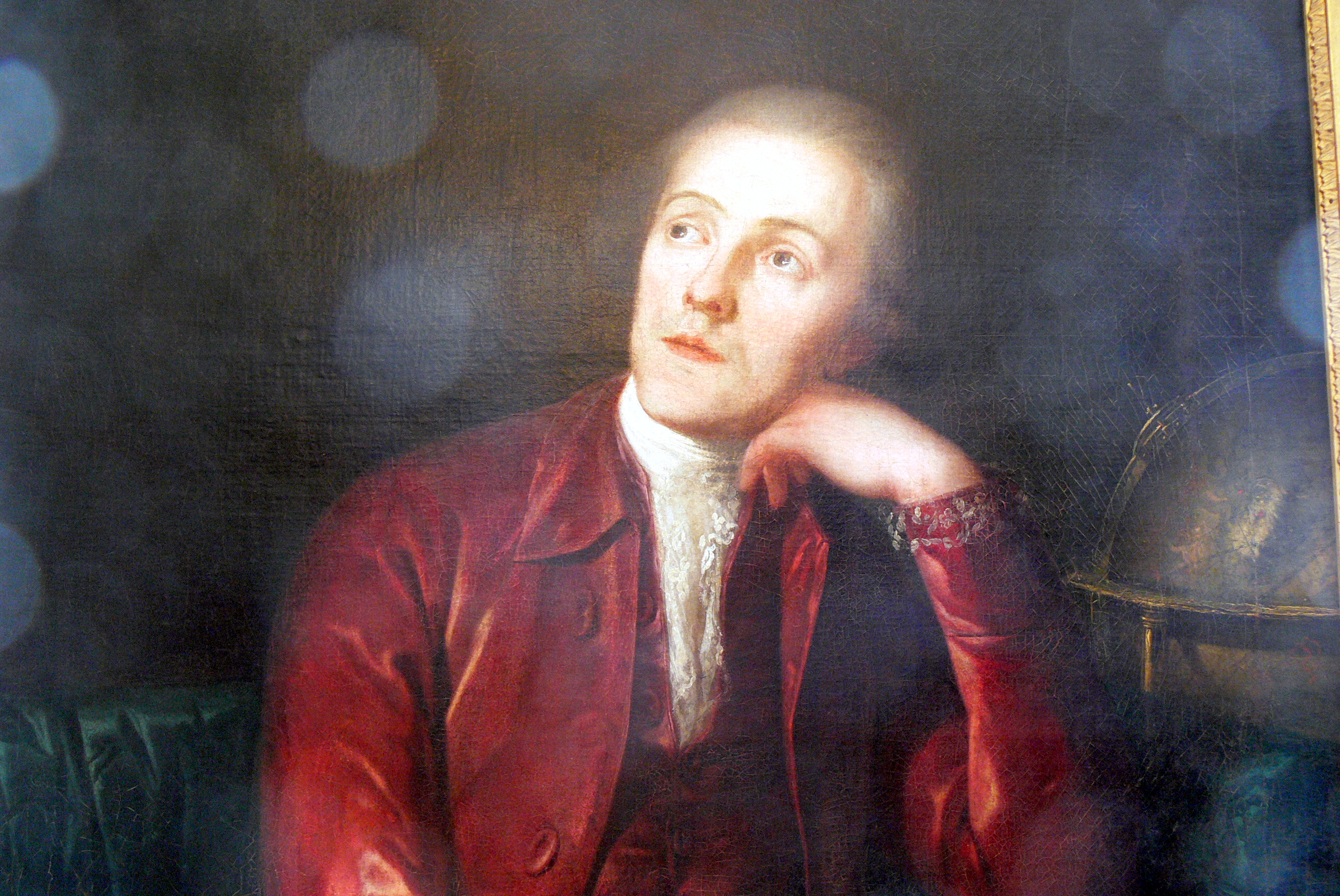
Nicolò Pacassi in Prague.

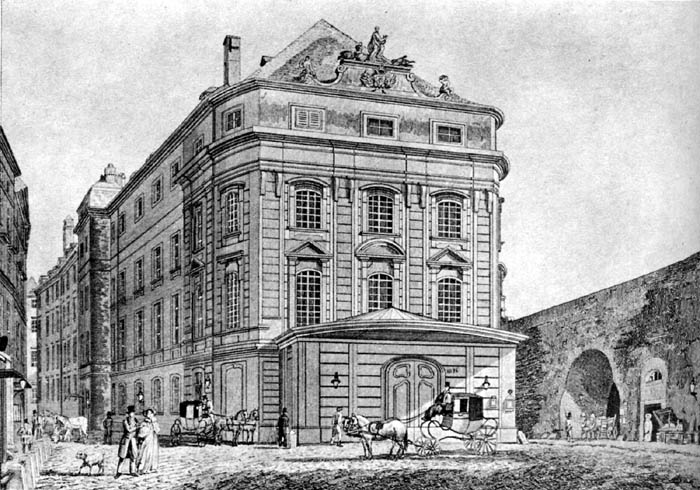
Pacassi's reconstructed Kärntnertortheater as it looked ca. 1830

Nicolò Pacassi (5 March 1716 – 11 November 1790), also known as Nikolaus Pacassi, was an Italian-Austrian architect. He was born in Wiener Neustadt in Lower Austria in a family of merchants from Gorizia. In 1753, he was appointed court architect to Maria Theresa of Austria. He was commissioned many works throughout the Austrian Empire, mainly in Vienna, Prague, Innsbruck, Buda and his native Gorizia and Gradisca. He died in Vienna.

== Works ==
- 1743 extension of Schloss Hetzendorf
- 1745–47 extension of Schönbrunn Palace including Schlosstheater Schönbrunn
- 1749–58 Buda Castle
- 1753–54 extension of Spanish Hall of Prague Castle
- 1753–75 Royal Palace of Prague Castle
- 1761–63 Rebuilt the Theater am Kärntnertor, Vienna (illustration)
- 1770 Reconstruction of Prague's cathedral St Vitus' tower
- 1766 Extension of Ballhausplatz
- Palazzo Attems Petzenstein in Gorizia
- 1784 Josephinum - designed as the Academy for Military Surgeons, sponsored by Emperor Joseph II
