= Spanish Hall =

Ceremonial hall of the New Royal Palace in Prague, Czech Republic

Coordinates: 50.0903°N 14.3985°E

- Building: Prague Castle
- Country: Czech Republic

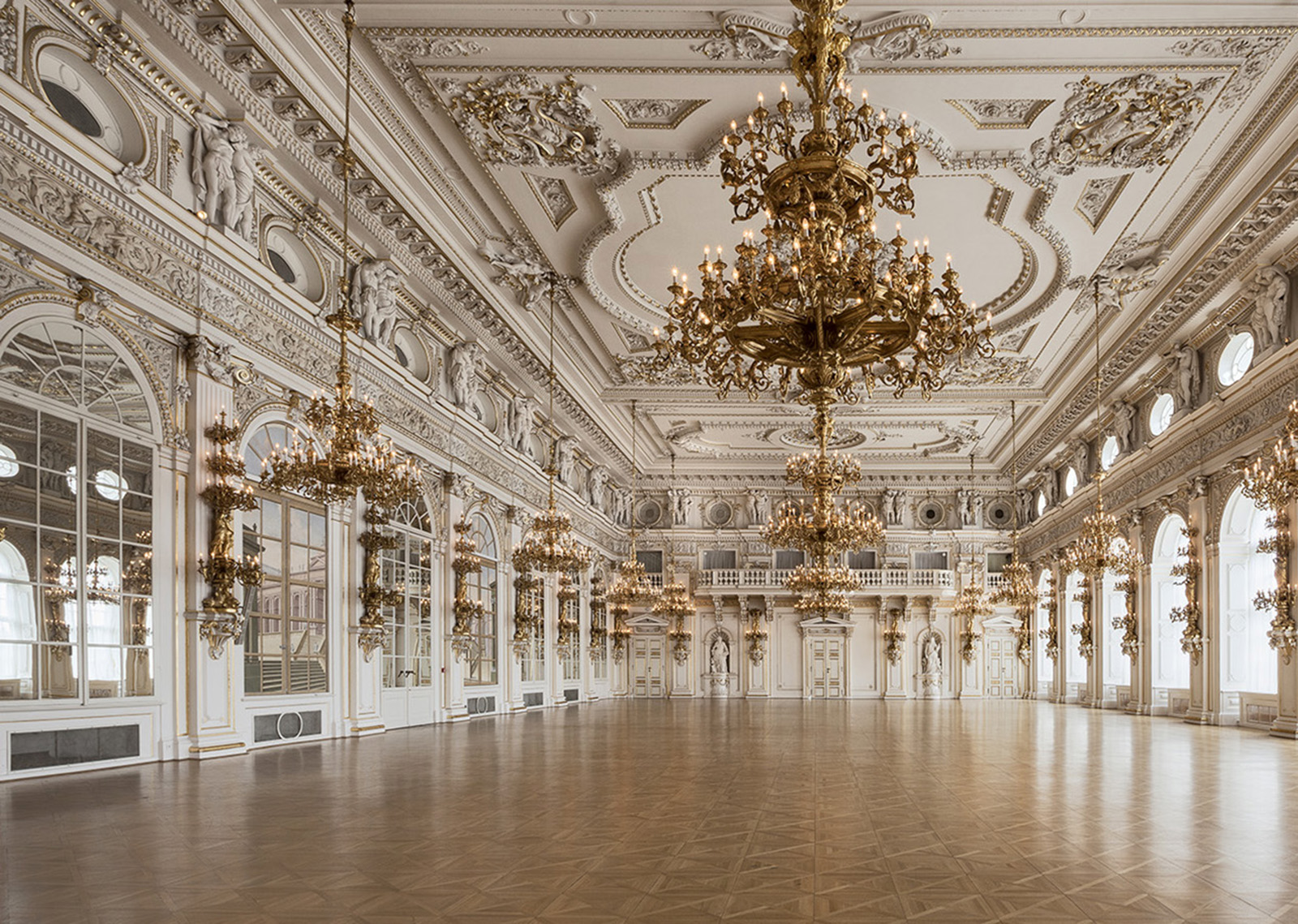
Spanish Hall

Spanish Hall (Czech: Španělský sál) is a ceremonial hall in the New Royal Palace of Prague Castle. As part of the State Rooms it is now used for the reception of official guests of the President of the Czech Republic. Many important political and social events take place in the hall.

== History ==
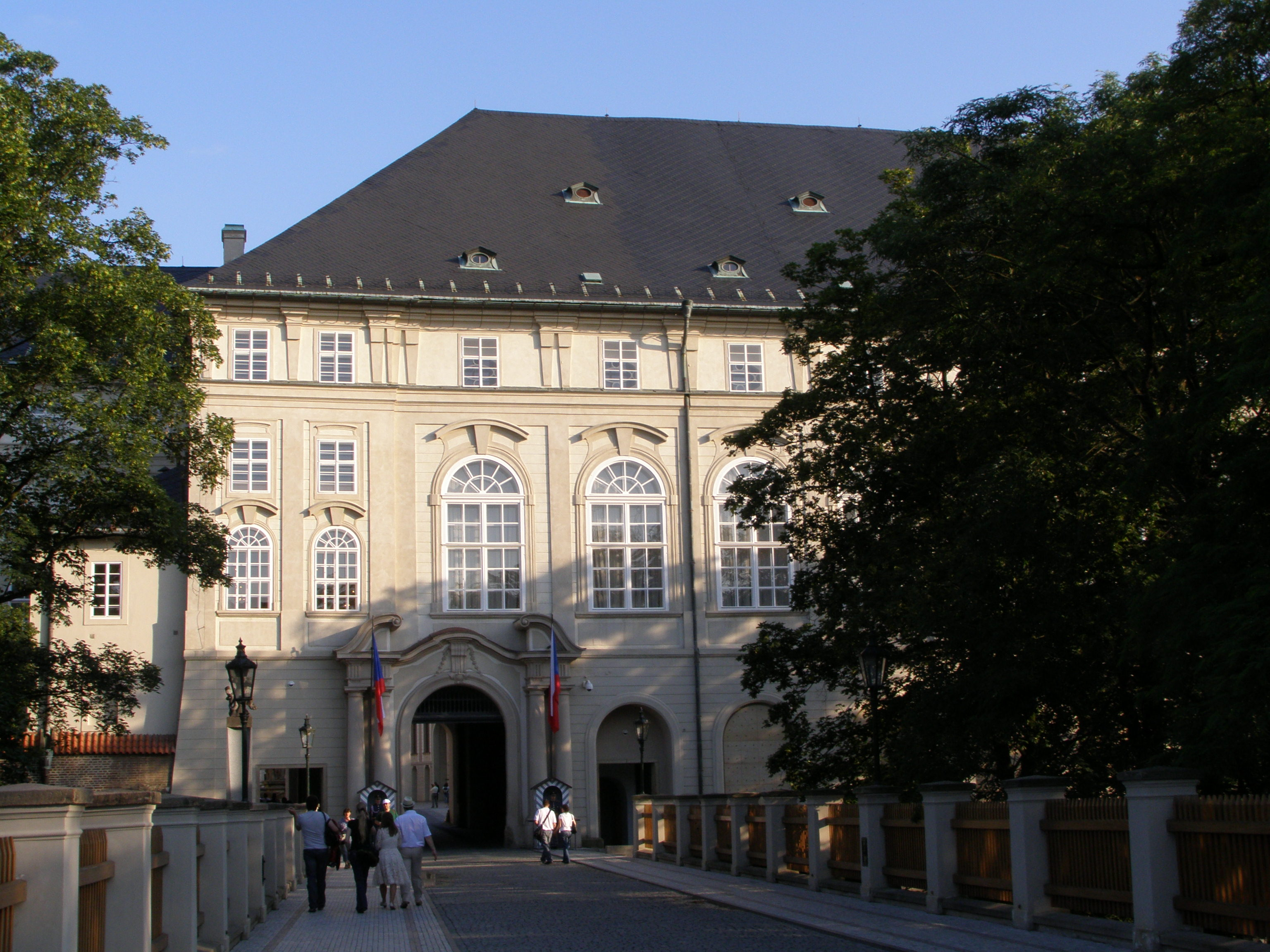
Windows of Spanish Hall from outside

Spanish Hall was originally intended for the display of statuary collected by Emperor Rudolph II. The over-lifesize terracotta and stucco statues by Adriaen de Vries were exhibited in the niches in the southern wall. Later the hall was used for ceremonial court occasions such as banquets and concerts. The hall was built in 1602–1606, perhaps by Italian architect Giovanni Maria Filippi. The walls were decorated with pilasters and Renaissance stucco reliefs, some of which have survived. A row of wooden columns in the centre of the hall supported a panelled coffer ceiling and underpinned the double span-roofs. In the early 18th century the original roofs were replaced by a new king-post roof during Kilián Ignác Dientzenhofer's alternations. The height of the hall was raised by 2.5 meters and a row of smaller windows was added. The hall was damaged during the Prussian bombardment of Prague Castle in 1757 and then was restored by Nicolò Pacassi who removed the central columns. In that time the niches in the southern wall were walled-up and the painter Norbert Kryštof Saeckel decorated them with illusive landscape views with ruins. In 1868 these paintings were covered with mirrors. In 1826 new toilets were installed between the Hall and neighbouring Rudolph Gallery. Both interiors were then rebuilt in 1865–1868 during the preparations for the Bohemian coronation of Emperor Francis Joseph I of Austria, which, however, never took place. The reconstruction was led by Viennese builder Ferdinand Kirschner to plans by architect Hans von Ferstel. The present relief decoration originated mostly in that time. Contrary to the Rudolphian freely modelled stucco it consists of plaster castings additionally fixed on the walls and the ceilings. The two shorter walls of the hall were designed and built in a wholly new way.

== Description ==
Spanish Hall measures 48 meters by 24 meters and 12 meters high. The two long walls have remained from the time of Rudolph II—with nine windows on the north side and the same number of niches of identical size on the south wall. The keystone above the central window bears the imperial monogram R with the Order of the Golden Fleece. The two shorter walls, with galleries, were built in 1860s and are decorated with sculptures of Art, Science, Trade and Industry by Auguste la Vigne. The gilded chandeliers and wall lights date from the late 19th century, and take over 2,000 electric light bulbs.
