= Royal Garden of Prague Castle =

Garden of Prague Castle, Czech Republic

- Královská zahrada
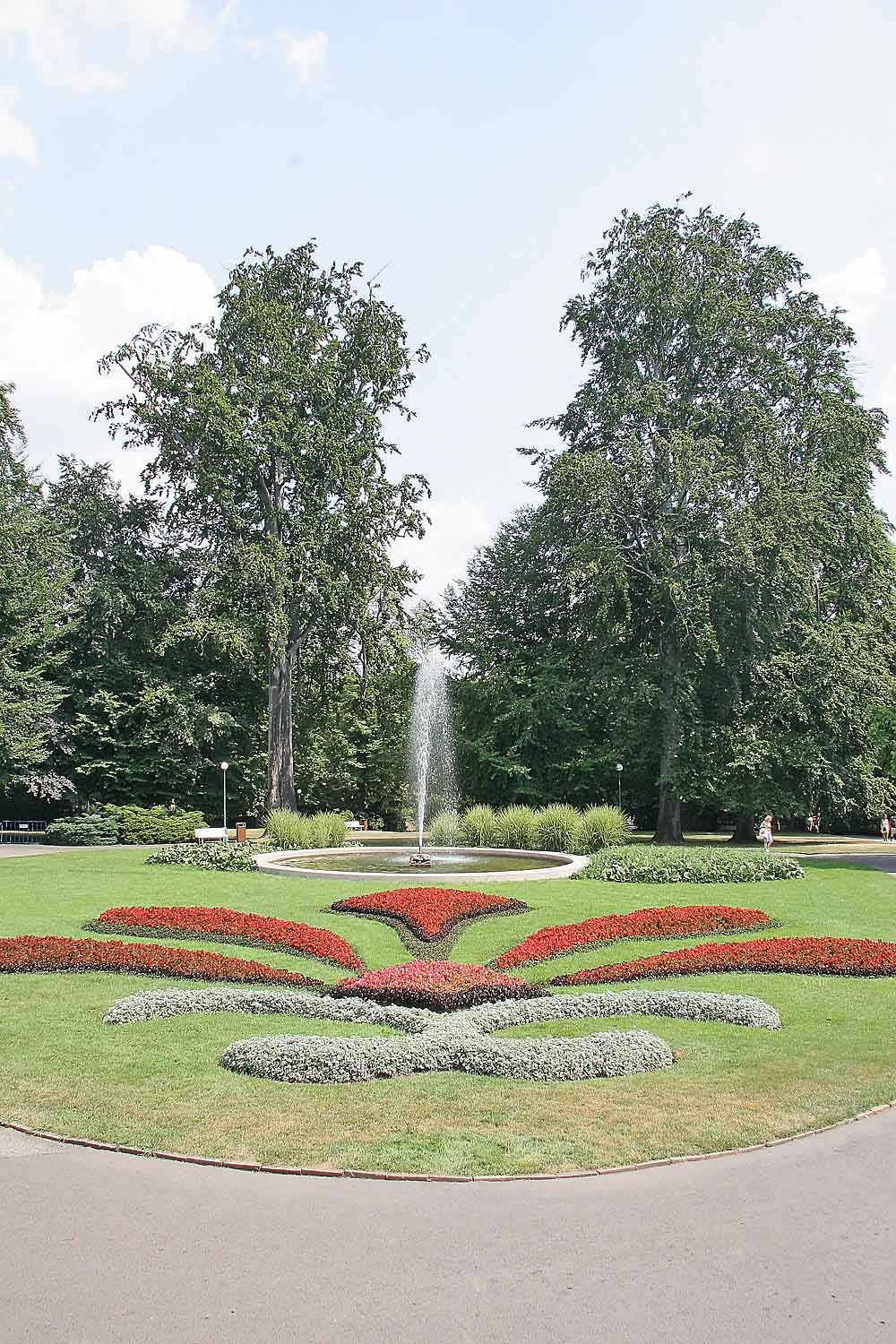
- View of the garden
- Interactive map of Royal Garden of Prague Castle
- Location: Prague, Czech Republic
- Coordinates: 50°5′35″N 14°24′7″E
- Designer: Bonifác Wohlmut; Paolo della Stella

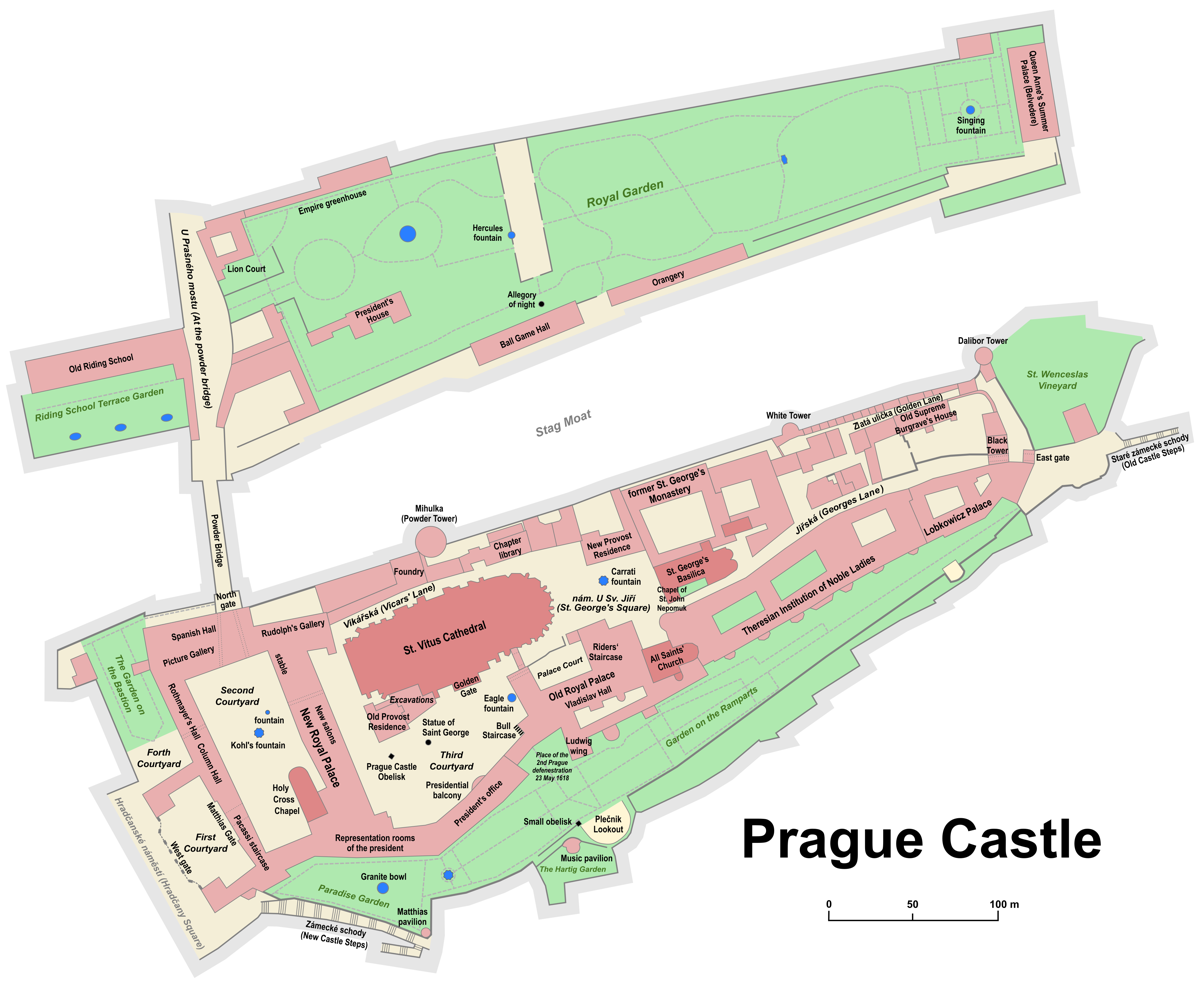
Map of Prague Castle

The Royal Garden (Czech: Královská zahrada) is an Italian Renaissance garden situated in Prague Castle, Czech Republic. The garden was created in 1534 based on designs by Emperor Ferdinand I of Habsburg. Its site was originally a vineyard that Emperor Ferdinand I purchased to create a garden for the royal court. The garden was founded simultaneously with the Queen Anne's Summer Palace, which was completed in 1560.

== Gallery ==
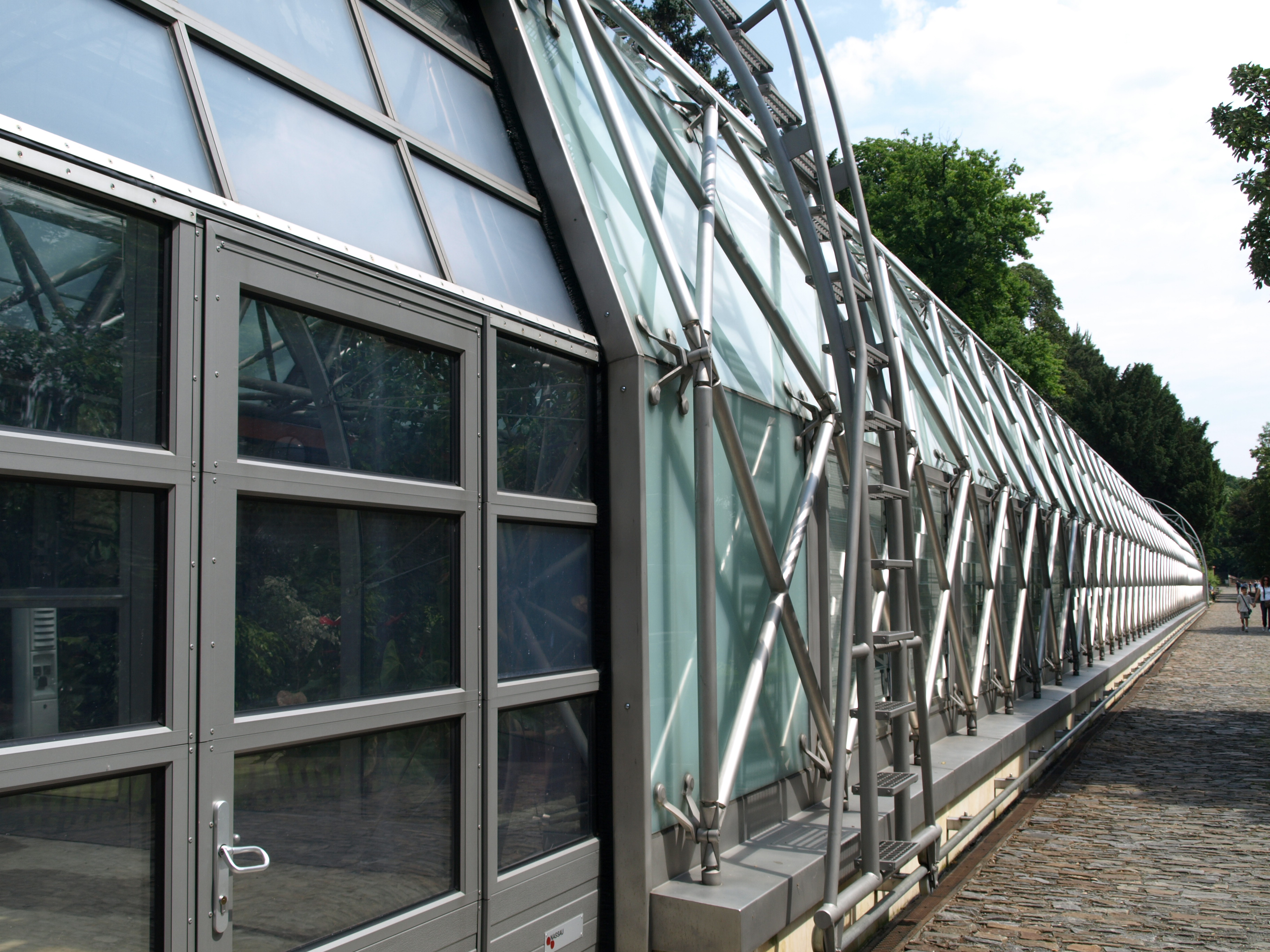
Orangery

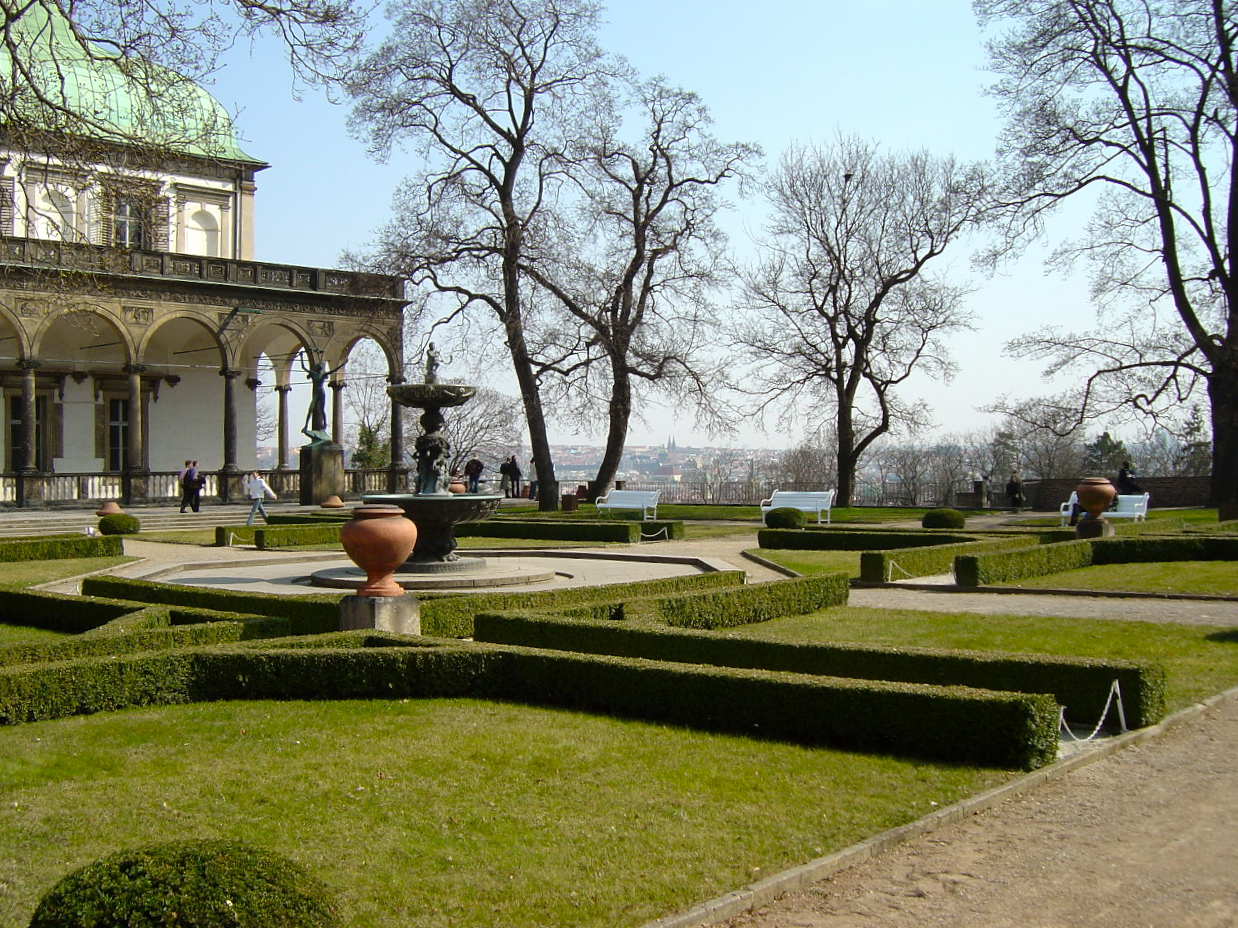
View

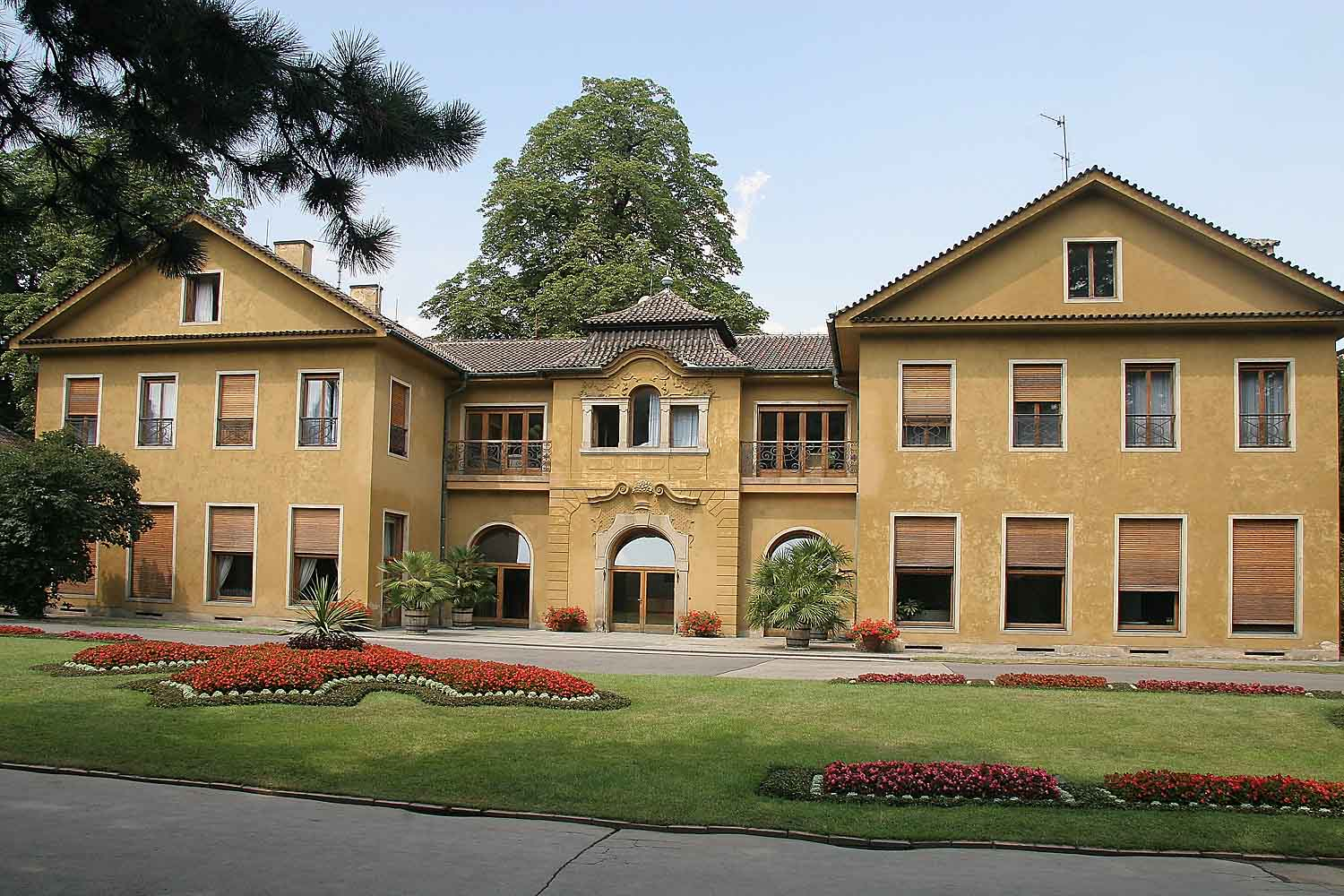
Villa of the president

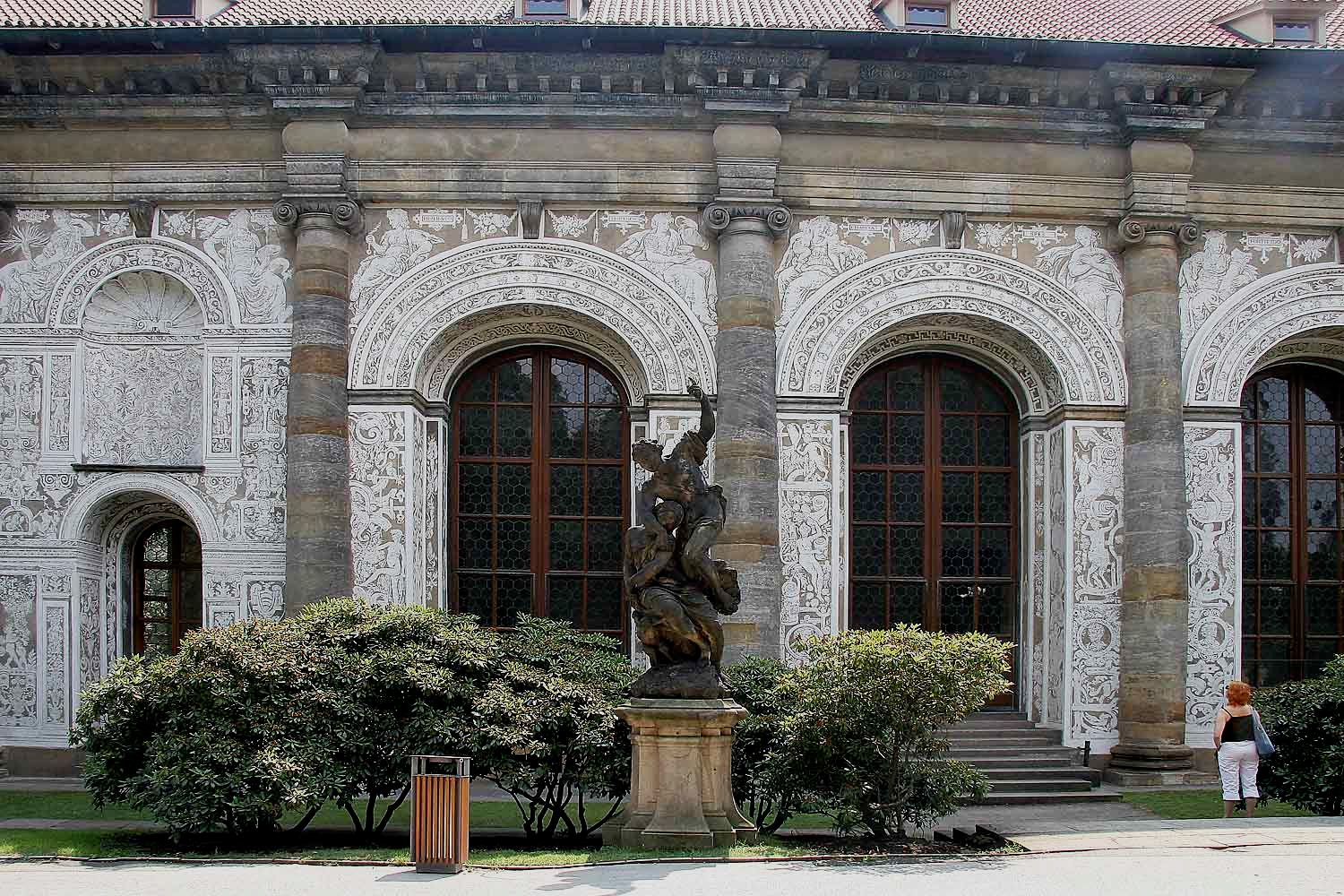
Real tennis room

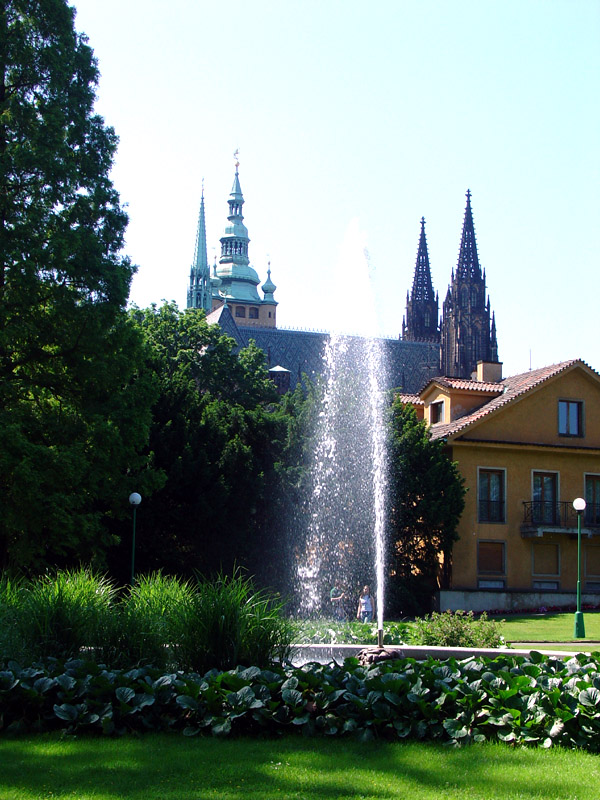
View of the fountain at St. Vitus Cathedral

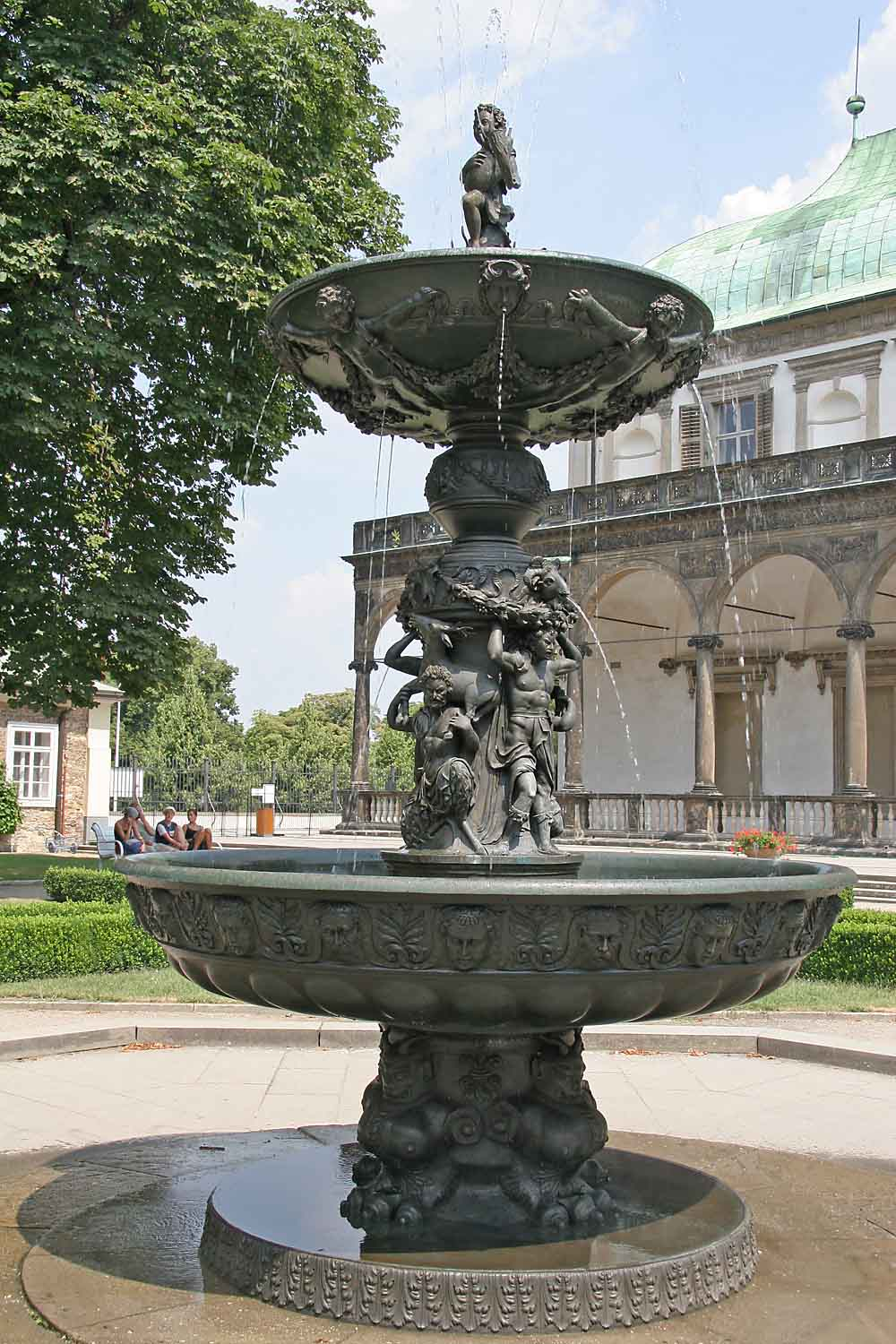
Singing fountain

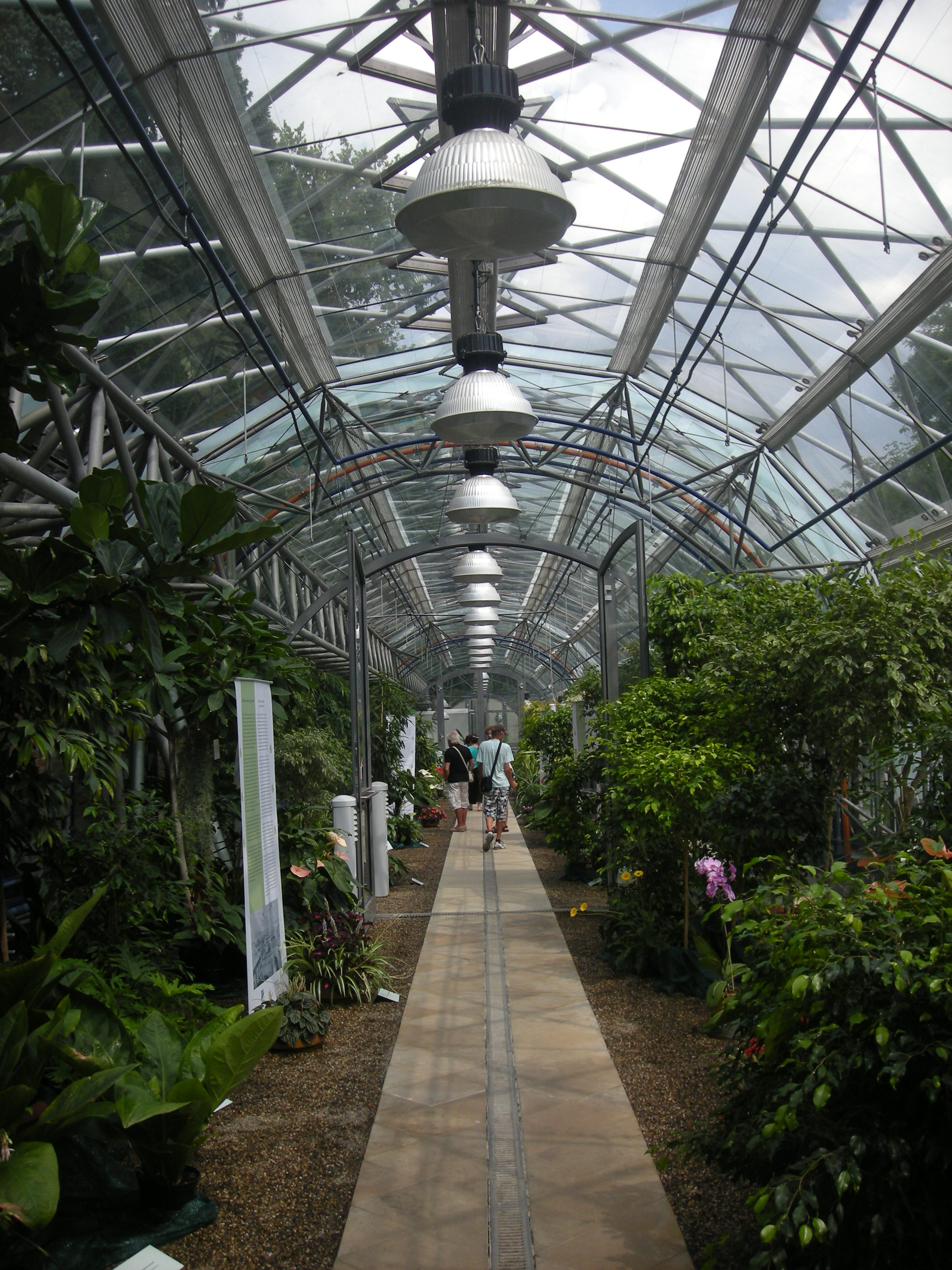
Inside the Orangery

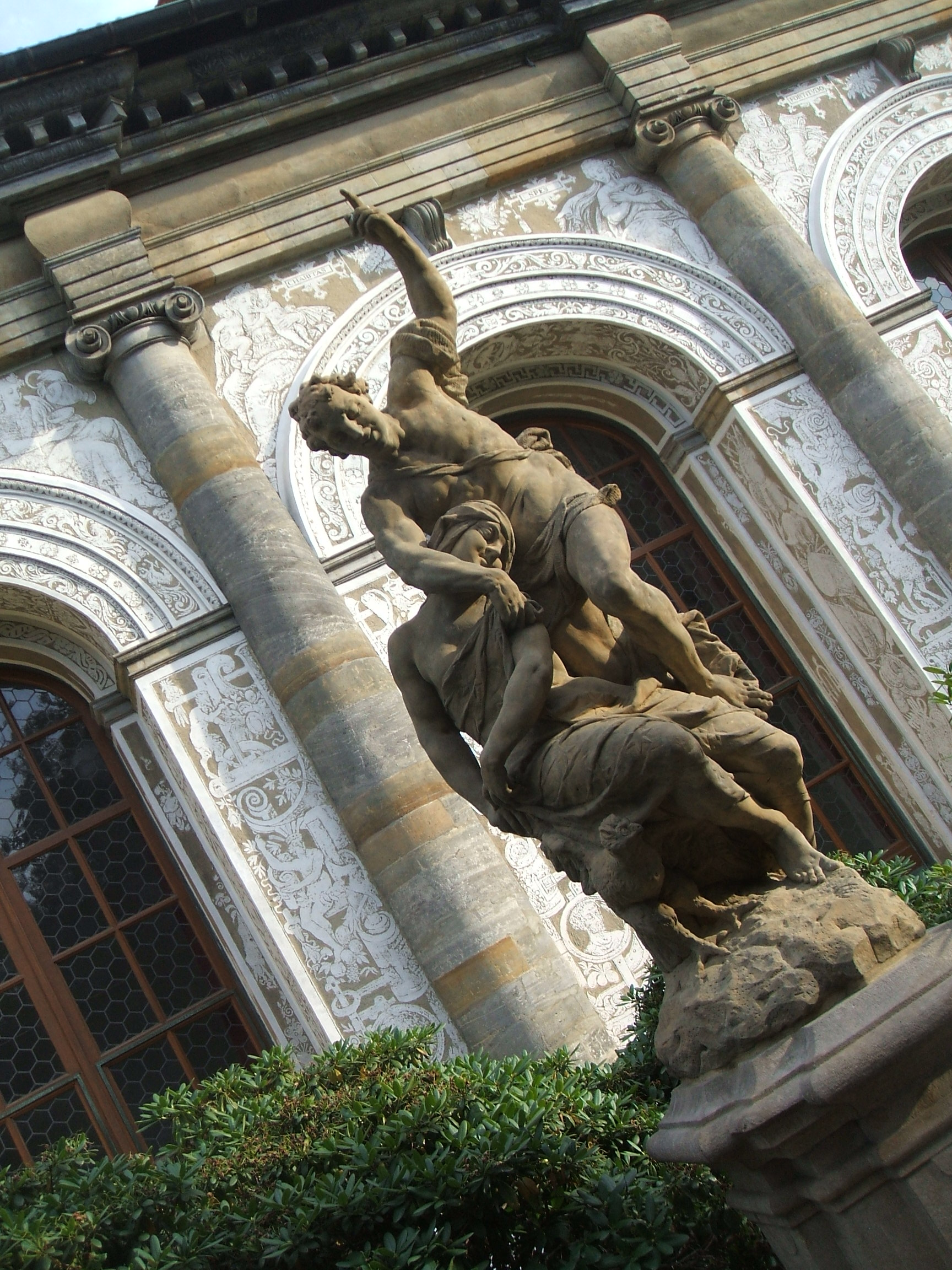
Allegory of night – Baroque sculpture by M.B. Braun
