= Orangery (Royal Garden of Prague Castle) =

Coordinates: 50°05′34″N 14°24′09″E

New orangery
- Nová oranžerie
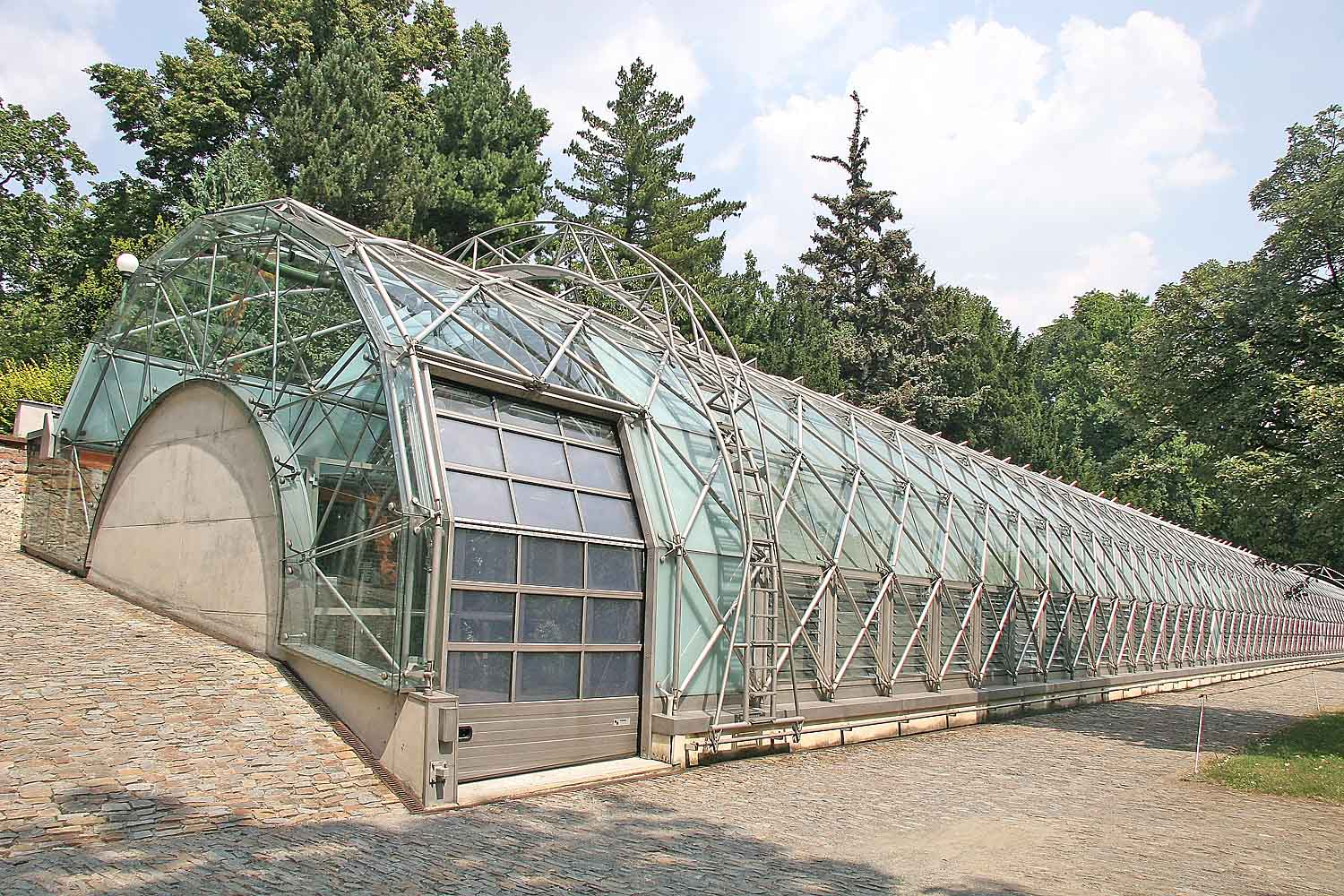
- Orangery in 2006
- Interactive map of the New orangery area

General information
- Architectural style: High-tech architecture
- Location: Royal Garden of Prague Castle, Prague, Czech Republic
- Construction started: 1999
- Opened: 2001
- Owner: Prague Castle

The Orangery (Czech: Oranžérie), more specifically the New Orangery, is a modern greenhouse in the Royal Garden of Prague Castle, Czechia. It was built between 1999 and 2001 on the site of the former renaissance orangery. It is located next to the Ball Game Hall, on the edge of the Deer Moat. It was designed by Czech architect Eva Jiřičná in high-tech architecture style for Olga Havlová, wife of former Czech president Václav Havel. It is used for growing tropical flowers and plants which are used in Prague Castle. The construction is 100 meters long.
