= Josef Pleskot =

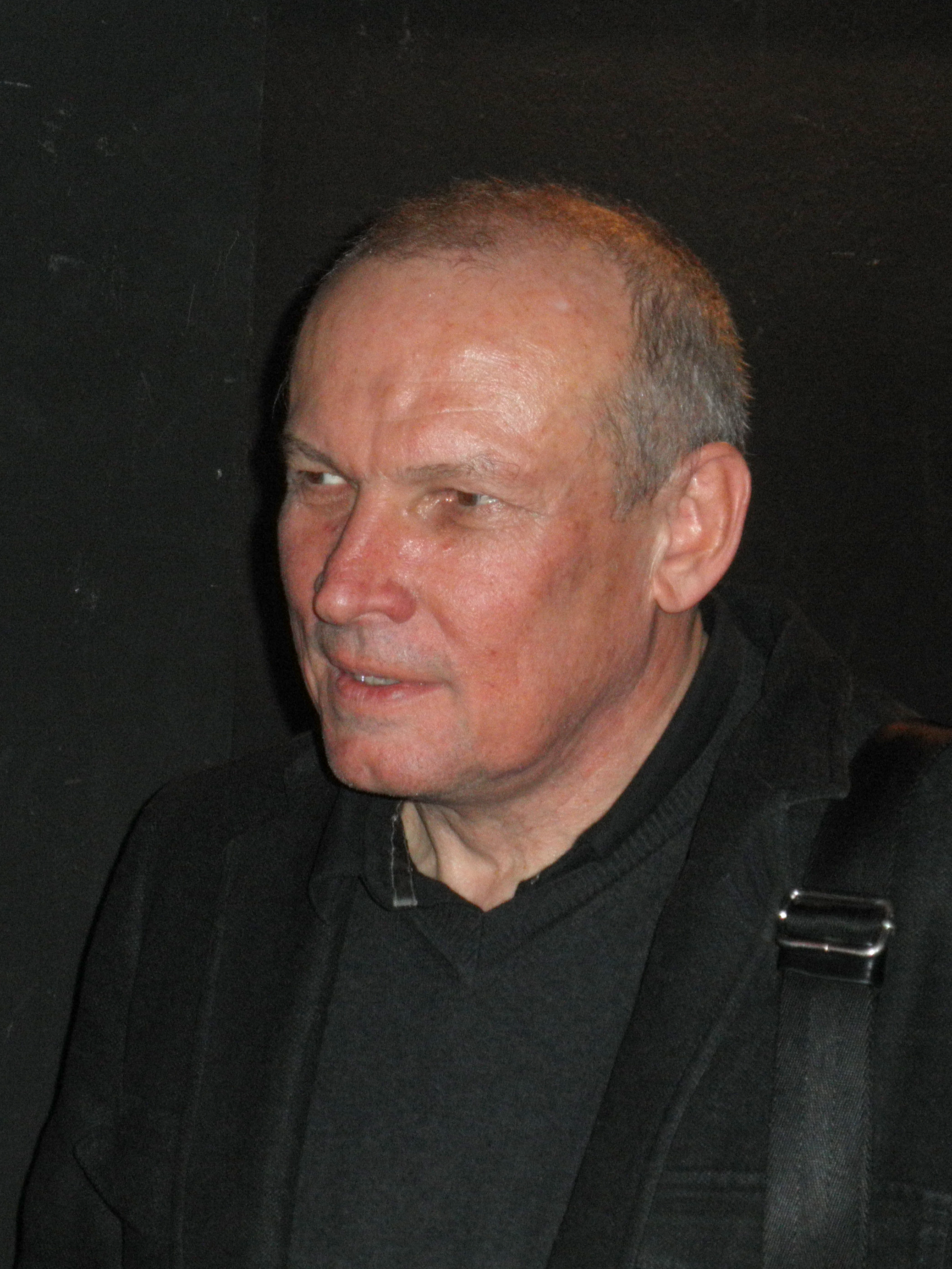
- Pleskot in 2012
- Born: 3 December 1952 (age 73); Písek
- Occupation: Architect
- Buildings: Headquarters of ČSOB, pedestrian tunnel in Deer Moat

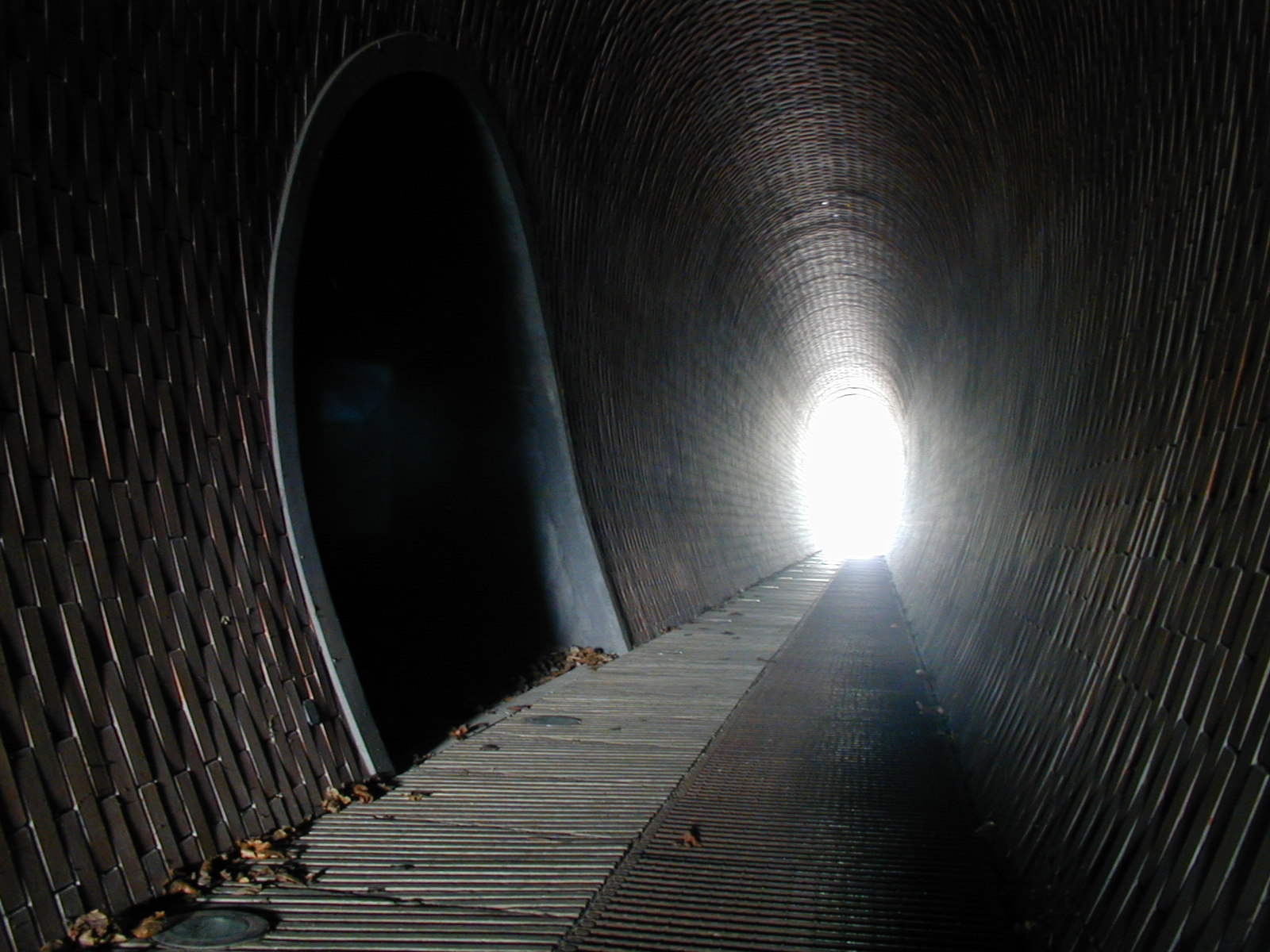
Pedestrian tunnel in the Deer Moat at the Prague Castle, designed by Josef Pleskot

Josef Pleskot (born 3 December 1952 in Písek) is a Czech architect. He is known mainly as the designer of the pedestrian tunnel in the Deer Moat at the Prague Castle, and administrative building of the ČSOB in Prague. In 2009, he was voted the most significant Czech architect of the 1989-2009 period.

== Biography and career ==
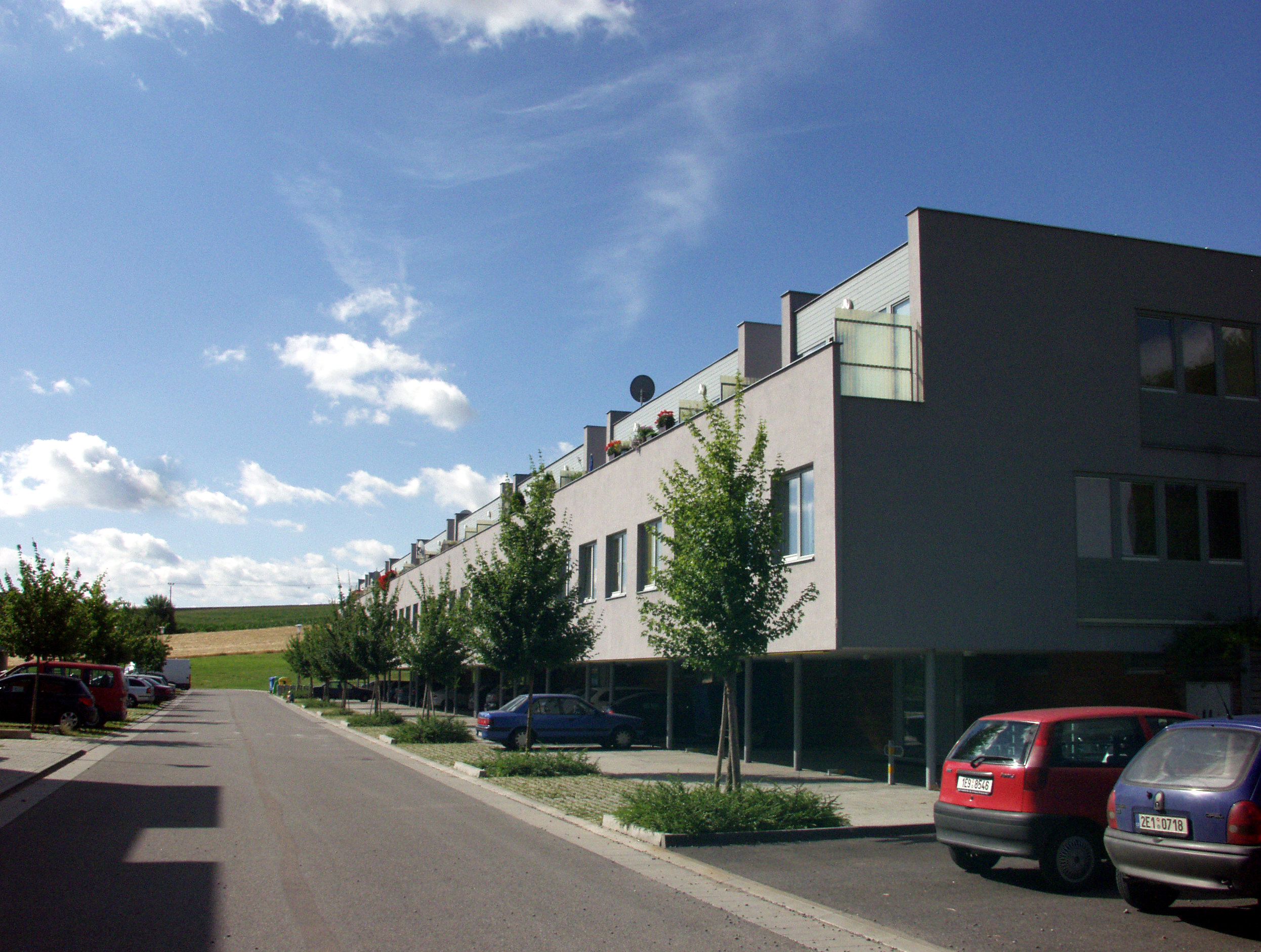
Flats in Litomyšl, block C10-C14.

From 1973 to 1979 he studied at the Faculty of Architecture of the Czech Technical University in Prague. Already as a student he attended several architectonic competitions, and in 1975 he won the first prize in the Young Architects Competition. Following his studies he worked as a teacher at the same school (Department of the Architectural Theory and Development). The 1980s he spent at the Krajský projektový ústav in Prague, in the atelier G-16. In 1991 he briefly came back to teach at the Czech Technical University. However, the same year he co-founded his own studio - the AP Atelier. The first success came in 1993, when the AP Atelier was awarded the honorable mention in the Grand Prix competition of the Czech Chamber of Architects. Pleskot won his first Grand Prix in 1995, for the reconstruction and completion of the town hall in Benešov. In 1997 he became a member of the Mánes Union of Fine Arts.

He works together with 12 colleagues in his team – the AP Atelier.

== Style ==
Pleskot focuses on architectural designs of various functions, he creates family houses (villas), big projects (his design of the ČSOB bank building was intended for more than 2500 employees), but he also deals with projects close to land art. His works encompass the wide spectrum of architecture.

In his designs, Pleskot was inspired by the Czech modern architecture. In 1980s he also studied the possibilities of the postmodern architecture and architectural neofunctionalism.

In 2009, the Czech magazine Reflex conducted a survey, in which 70 architects, theorists of architecture and art historians were asked to name the most significant personality of the Czech architecture in the period from 1989 (the fall of the communist régime) to 2009. Pleskot convincingly won.

== Awards ==
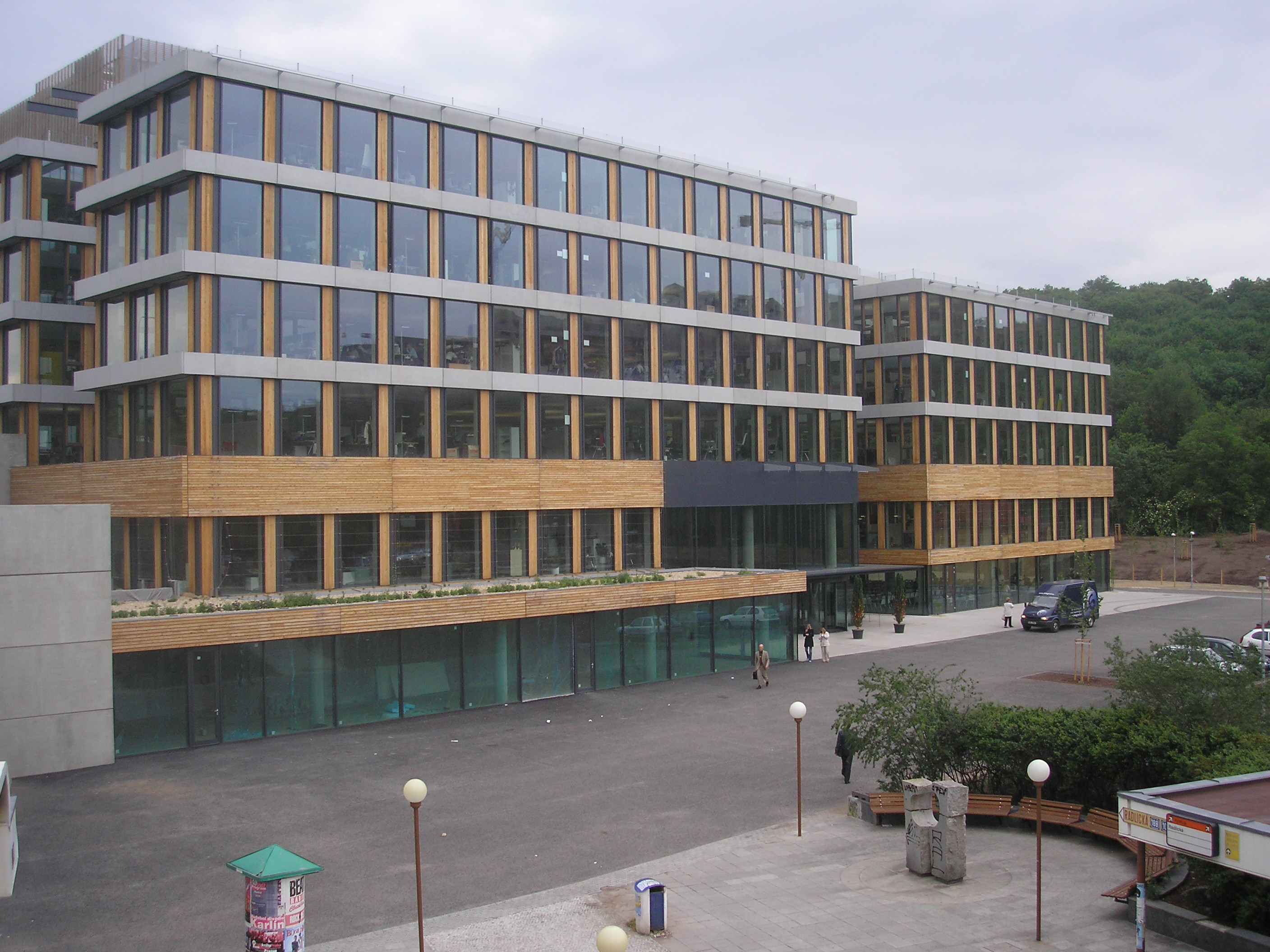
The administrative building of the ČSOB in Prague, Radlice

- 1993 Grand Prix - honorable mention (the factory Megafyt in Vrané nad Vltavou)
- 1995 Grand Prix - 1st prize (completion of the town hall in Benešov)
- 1995 Grand Prix - honorable mention (villa of the businessman Petr Kellner in Vrané nad Vltavou)
- 1995 Grand Prix - honorable mention (Lion Courtyard at the Prague castle)
- 2004 Brick Award (Award for the best Brick building in Europe, the pedestrian tunnel in the Deer Moat at the Prague Castle)
- 2004 Piranesi Award (Czech Consulate in Munich)
- 2008 Grand Prix - 1st prize (the headquarters of the ČSOB, Prague – Radlice)
- 2008 LEED - the gold certificate of the LEED Rating Systems (Leadership in Energy and Environmental Design), the headquarters of the ČSOB – the only building in Europe with that certificate (as of 2008)
