= Queen Anne's Summer Palace =

Coordinates: 50°05′37″N 14°24′19″E

- Letohrádek královny Anny
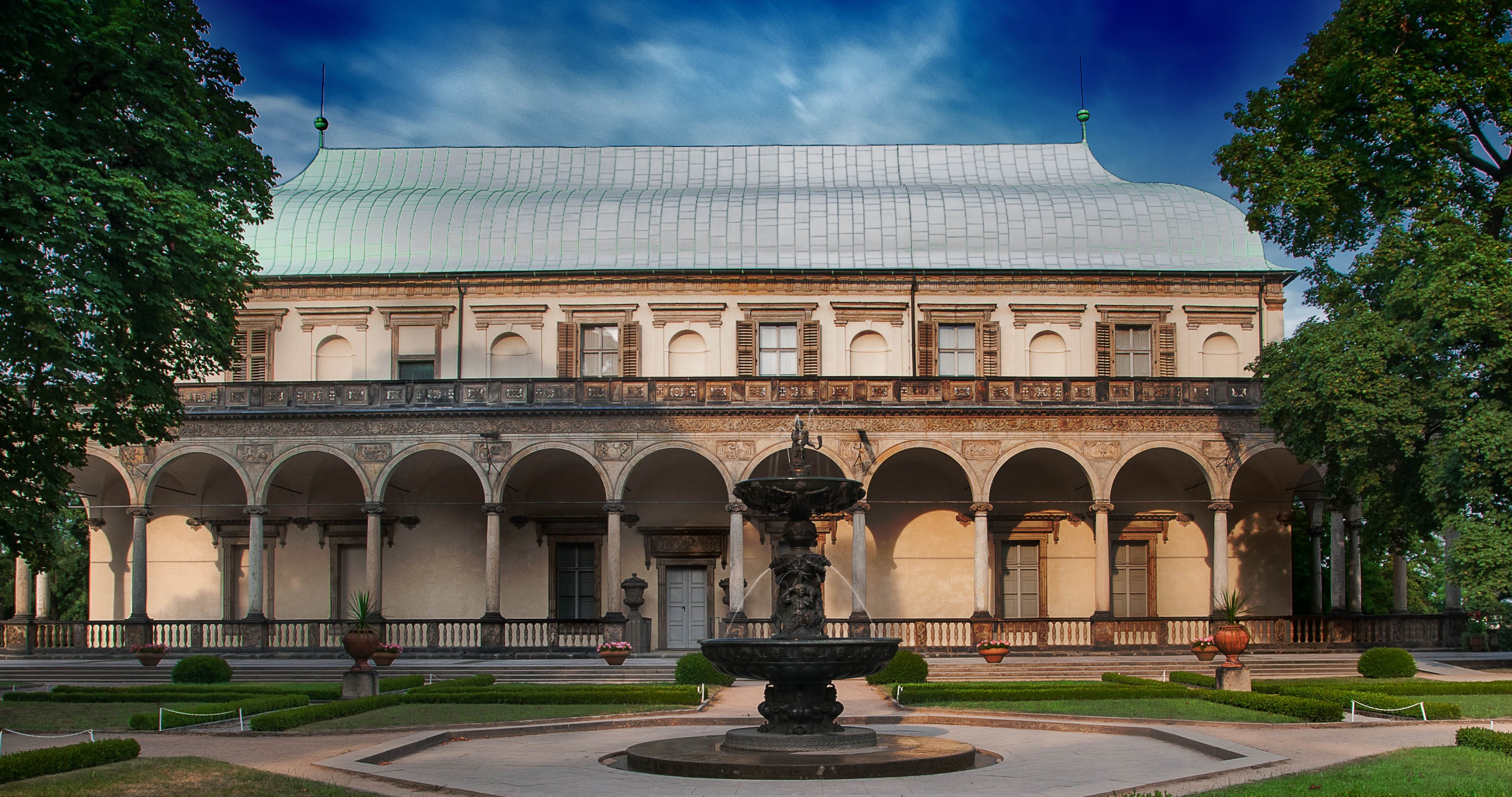
- Palace in 2015
- Interactive map of Queen Anne's Summer Palace

General information
- Type: Summer Palace
- Architectural style: Renaissance
- Location: Prague, Czech Republic
- Groundbreaking: 1538
- Opened: 1560

Design and construction
- Architect: Paolo della Stella

Queen Anne's Summer Palace (Czech: Letohrádek královny Anny), sometimes called Belvedere, is a Renaissance building located in the Royal Garden of Prague Castle in the Czech Republic. It is considered to be one of the purest Italian Renaissance architecture located outside of Italy.

== History ==
Ferdinand I commissioned the Summer Palace, built on the eastern edge of the Royal Garden between 1538 and 1560, for his wife Anne Jagiellonica. The garden was founded simultaneously with the palace. It was initially designed by Italian architect Paolo della Stella, and construction was started by Giovanni Spatio, but both men died before the building was completed, as did Jagiellonica.

Upon its completion, the palace was not regularly used until Rudolf II converted its first floor into an astronomical observatory, and used the palace to accommodate his guests. After Rudolf II's death, the palace was again unused for over thirty years. Afterwards, it served as a military base for Swedish soldiers in the Thirty Years War. For over 100 years, an artillery laboratory was based on the grounds until the governor Karl, Count Chotek of Chotkow and Wognin evicted the artillery.

After it was abandoned by the military, Bernhard Grueber and Pietro Nobile organised the renovation of the building, which included the addition of a picture gallery and a Classicist staircase. Other reconstruction of the building took place in 1860s. In the 1950s, the palace was restored by a Czech architect Pavel Janák and it served as an exhibition hall. It became a National Cultural Monument in 1962. Since then, the building has provided space for exhibitions of fine and applied arts.

== Description ==
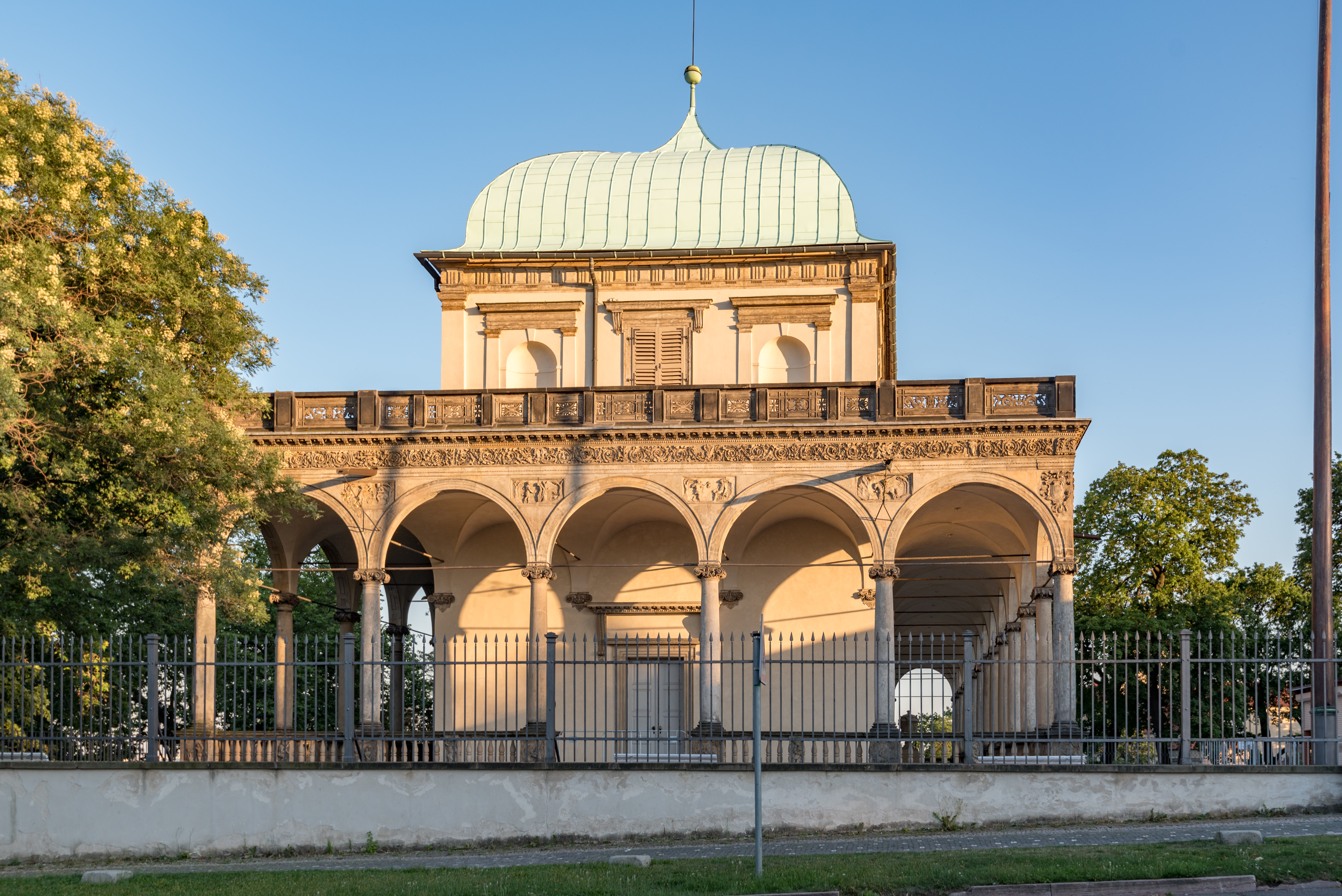
North frontage of the Summer Palace

The lower part of the palace includes the ground floor with an arcade gallery around the whole building. On the upper floor are residential areas, a dance hall, and a gallery. Above the arcade gallery, there is first floor with a copper roof, which was not part of della Stella's original design, but added by Bonifác Wohlmut. There is also a singing fountain from 1654 located in front of the Summer Palace.
