= Deer Moat =

Natural ravine near Prague Castle, Czechia

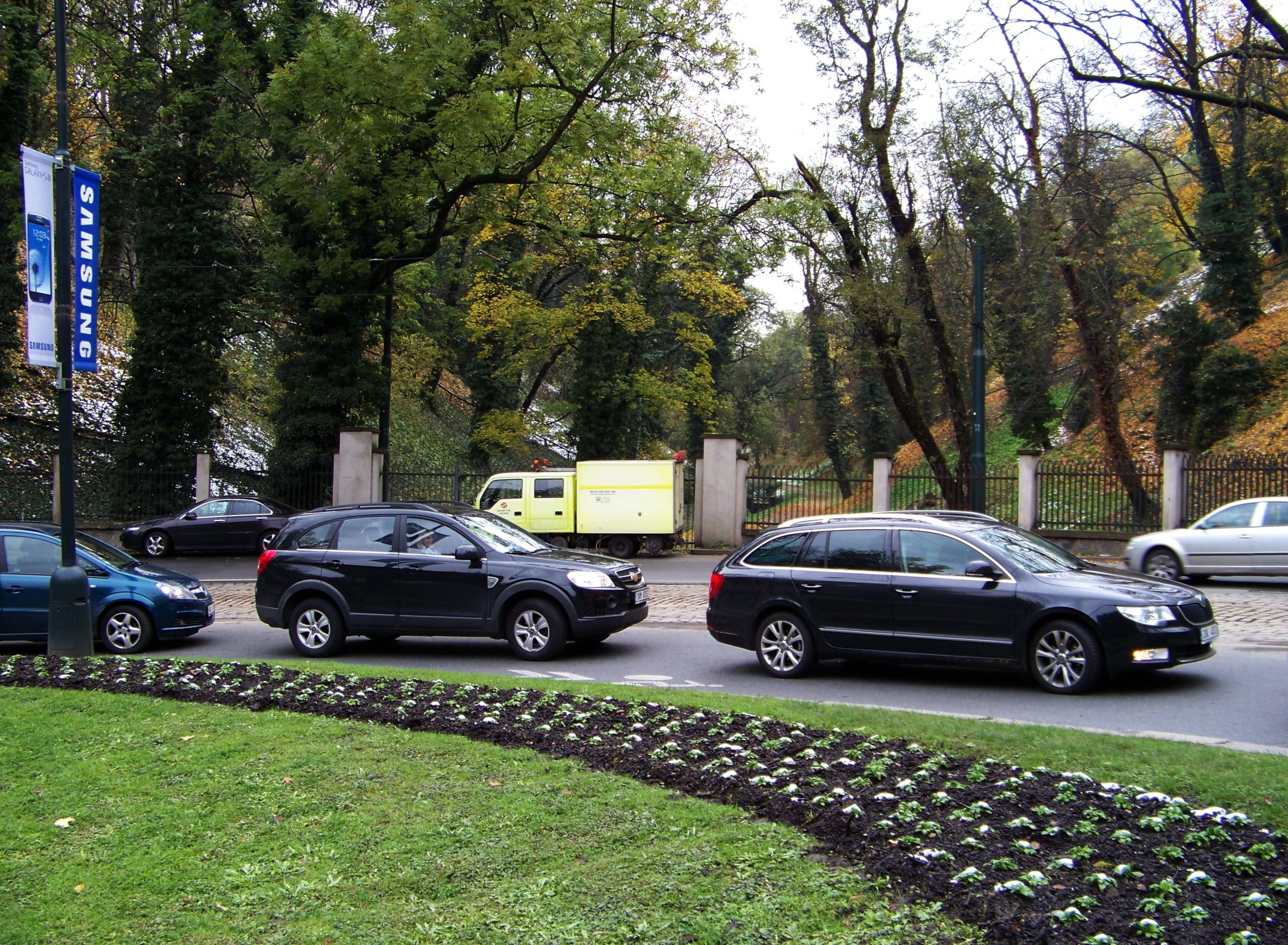
Bottom part of Deer Moat viewed from Chotkova street

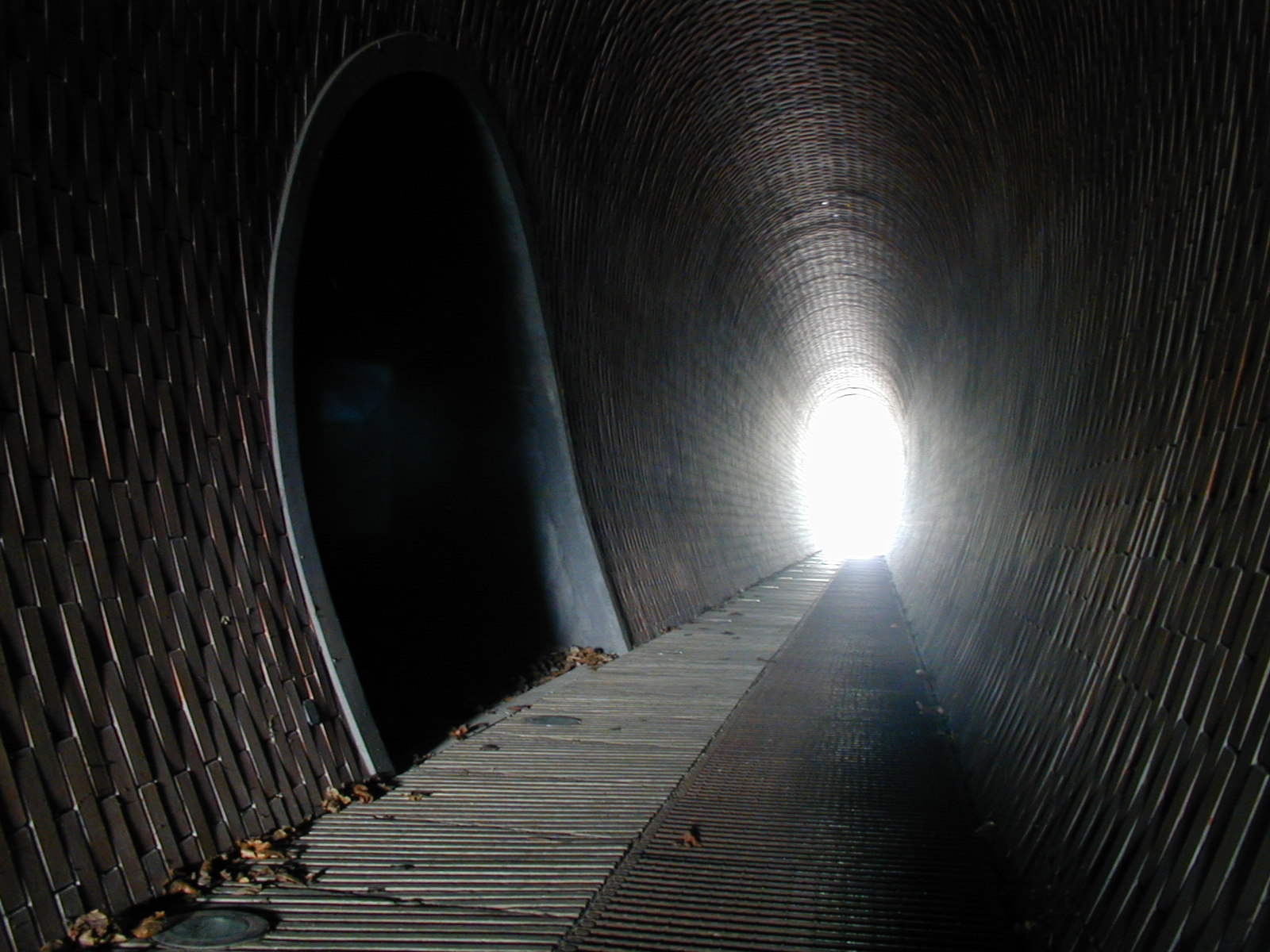
Tunnel connecting both parts of Deer Moat under Prašný Bridge

The Deer Moat or Stag Moat (Czech: Jelení příkop) is a natural ravine dividing the promontory of Prague Castle and its north foreground. The 1 kilometre (0.62 mi) long ravine extends along Brusnice stream from U Brusnice to Chotkova street. It is divided in two parts by Prašný Bridge. It got its name because it served as a breeding ground for deer between the 17th and 18th centuries. Since 2002, the two parts are connected by a tunnel for pedestrians designed by a Czech architect Josef Pleskot. In the spring of 2021 the upper part of the Deer Moat was reopened to public after a reconstruction that took place in the previous years, the lower part was reopened in December 2022.
