= Prague Castle =

Historic building in the Czech Republic

- Pražský hrad
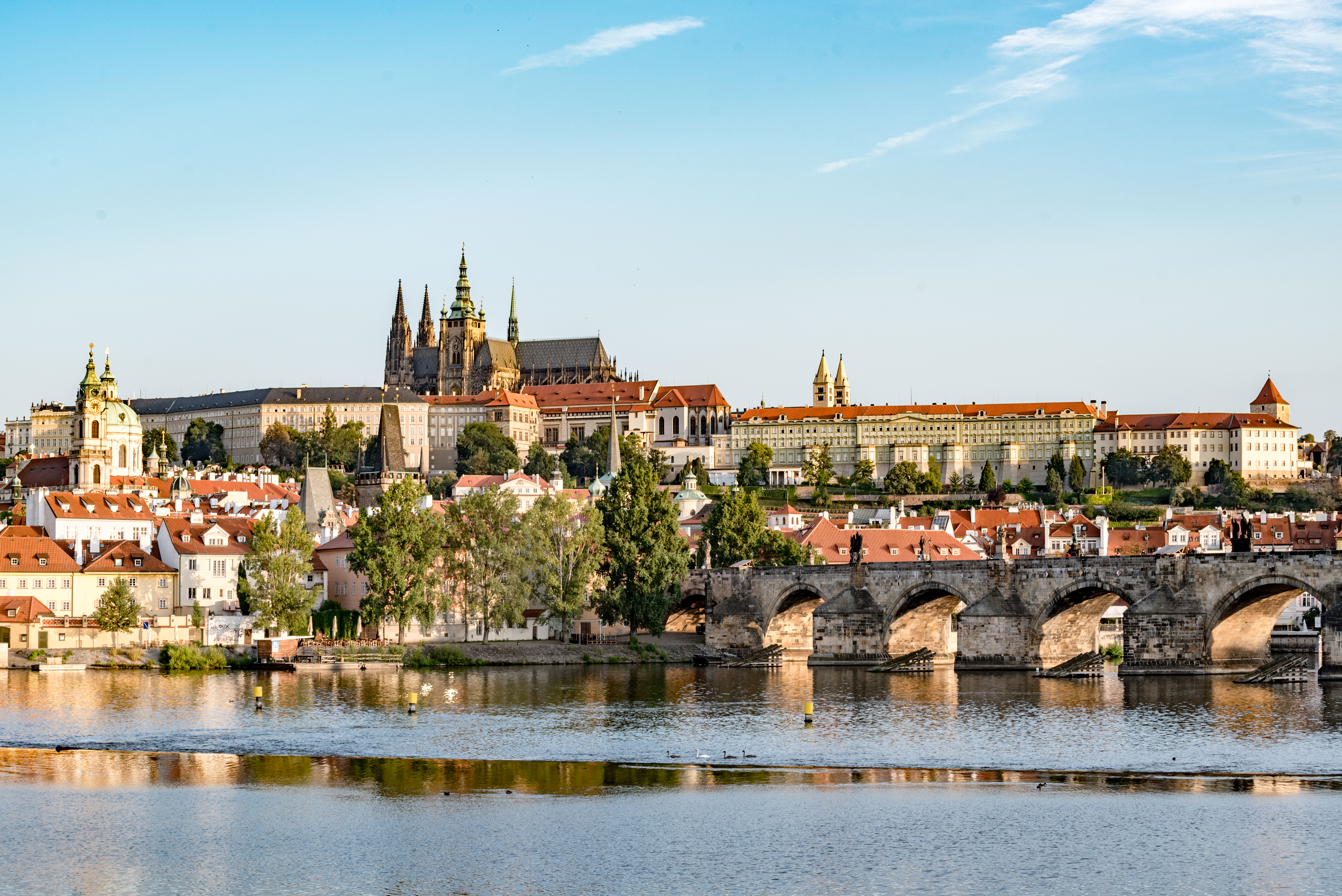
- Prague Castle

General information
- Architectural style: Baroque, Mannerism
- Location: Prague 1, Prague, Czech Republic
- Coordinates: 50°05′N 14°24′E
- Current tenants: Petr Pavel (2023–present)
- Construction started: 870

Design and construction
- Architects: Matthias of Arras, Peter Parler

Website
- www.hrad.cz

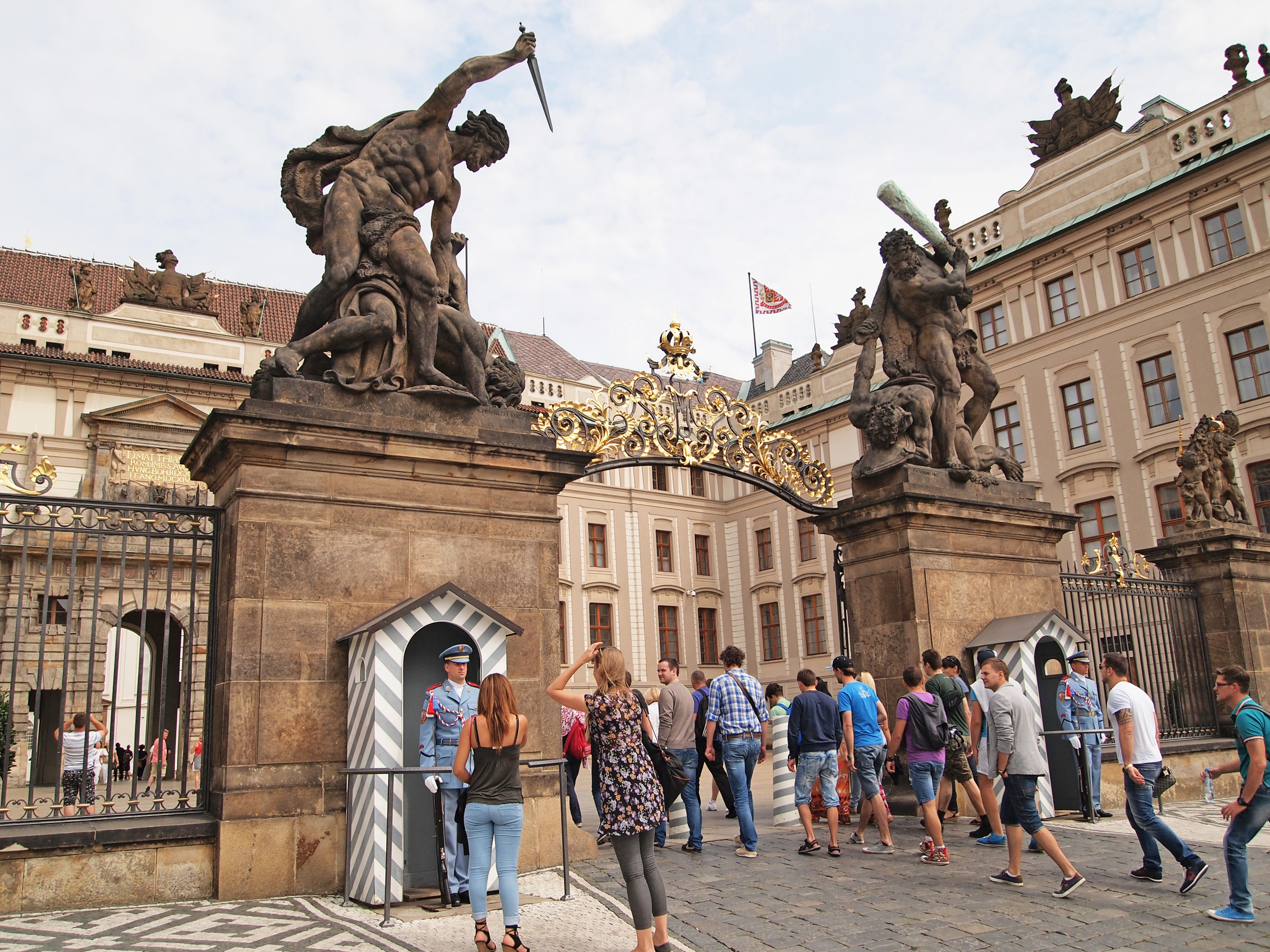
Sentries of the Prague Castle Guard at the entrance to the New Royal Palace

Prague Castle (Czech: Pražský hrad; [ˈpraʃskiː ˈɦrat]) is a castle complex in Prague, Czech Republic serving as the official residence and workplace of the president of the Czech Republic. Built in the 9th century, the castle has long served as the seat of power for kings of Bohemia, Holy Roman emperors, and presidents of Czechoslovakia. As such, the term "Prague Castle" or simply "Hrad" ("the Castle") are often used as metonymy for the president and his staff and advisors. The Bohemian Crown Jewels are kept within a hidden room inside it.

According to the Guinness Book of Records, Prague Castle is the largest ancient castle in the world, occupying an area of almost 70,000 square metres (750,000 square feet), at about 570 metres (1,870 feet) in length and an average of about 130 metres (430 feet) wide. The castle is the most visited tourist attraction in the Czech Republic. In 2024, the castle attracted 2.59 million visitors.

== History ==
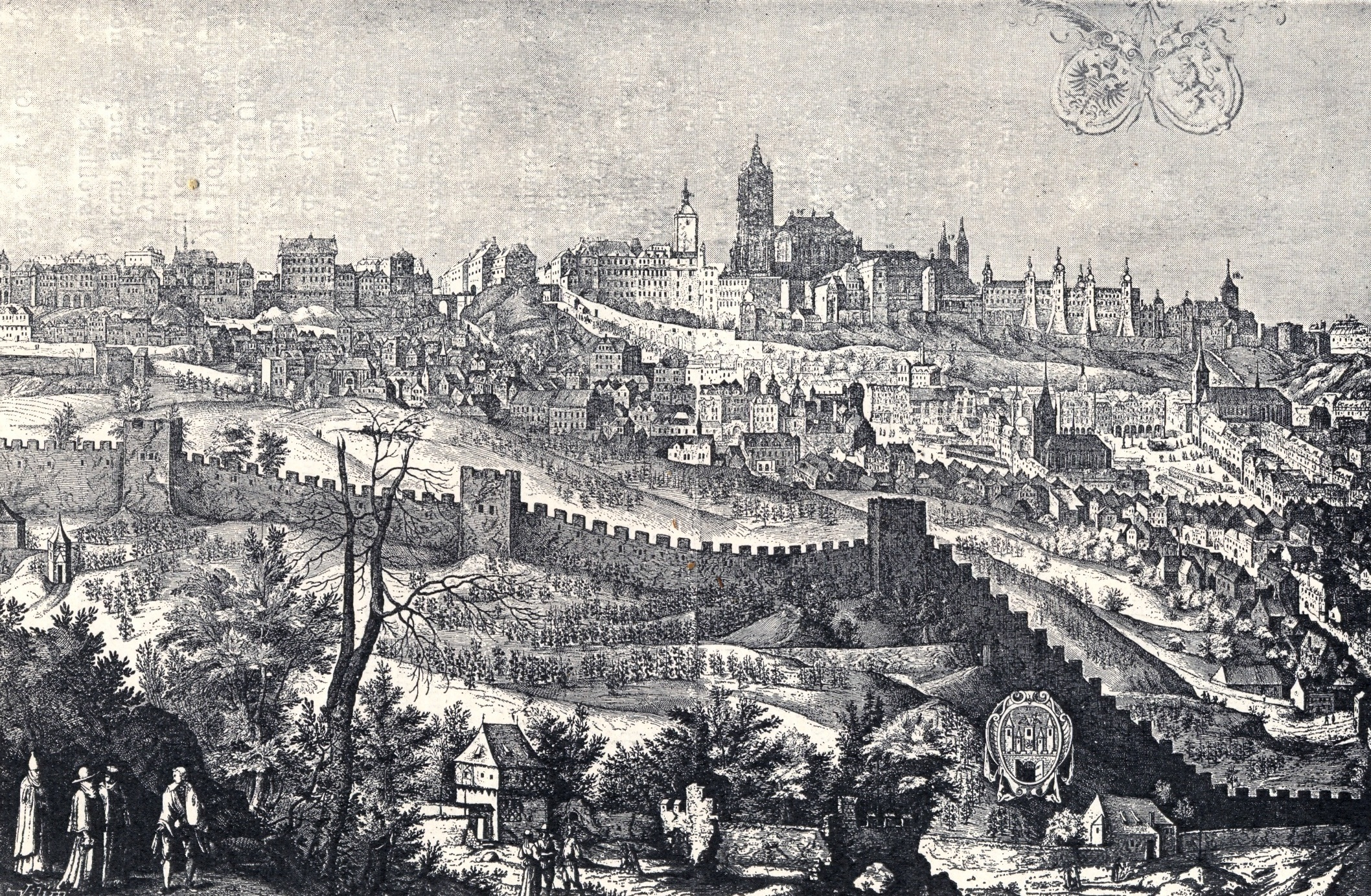
Prague Castle in 1607

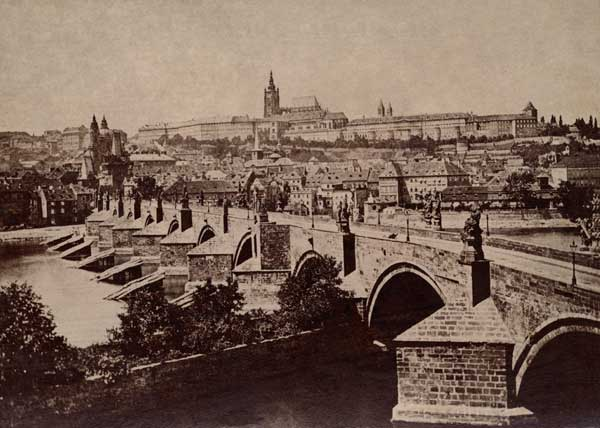
Prague Castle in 1870

=== Přemyslid fort ===
The history of the castle began in 870 when its first walled building, the Church of the Virgin Mary, was built. The Basilica of Saint George and the Basilica of St. Vitus were founded under the reign of Vratislaus I, Duke of Bohemia and his son Wenceslaus I in the first half of the 10th century.

The first convent in Bohemia was founded in the castle, next to the church of St. George. A Romanesque palace was erected here during the 12th century.

Several 13th-century Venetian coins found there were studied by the numismatist Zdenka Nemeškalová-Jiroudková.

=== Medieval castle ===
King Ottokar II of Bohemia improved fortifications and rebuilt the royal palace for the purposes of representation and housing. In the 14th century, under the reign of Charles IV the royal palace was rebuilt in Gothic style and the castle fortifications were strengthened. In place of the rotunda and basilica of St. Vitus, building began of a vast Gothic church, that were completed almost six centuries later.

During the Hussite Wars and the following decades, the castle was not inhabited. In 1485, King Vladislaus II Jagiellon began to rebuild the castle. The massive Vladislav Hall (built by Benedikt Rejt) was added to the Royal Palace. New defence towers were also built on the north side of the castle.

A large fire in 1541 destroyed large parts of the castle. Under the Habsburgs, some new buildings in Renaissance style were added. Ferdinand I built the Belvedere as a summer palace for his wife Anne. Rudolph II used Prague Castle as his main residence. He founded the northern wing of the palace, with the Spanish Hall, where his precious art collections were exhibited.

The Third Defenestration of Prague in 1618 took place at the castle which kick-started the Bohemian Revolt. During the subsequent wars, the castle was damaged and dilapidated. Many works from the collection of Rudolph II were looted by Swedes in 1648 during the Battle of Prague (1648) which was the final act of the Thirty Years' War.

The last major rebuilding of the castle was carried out by Empress Maria Theresa in the second half of the 18th century. Following the abdication of Ferdinand I, in 1848, and the succession of his nephew, Franz Joseph, to the throne, the former emperor, Ferdinand I, made Prague Castle his home.

=== Presidential residence ===
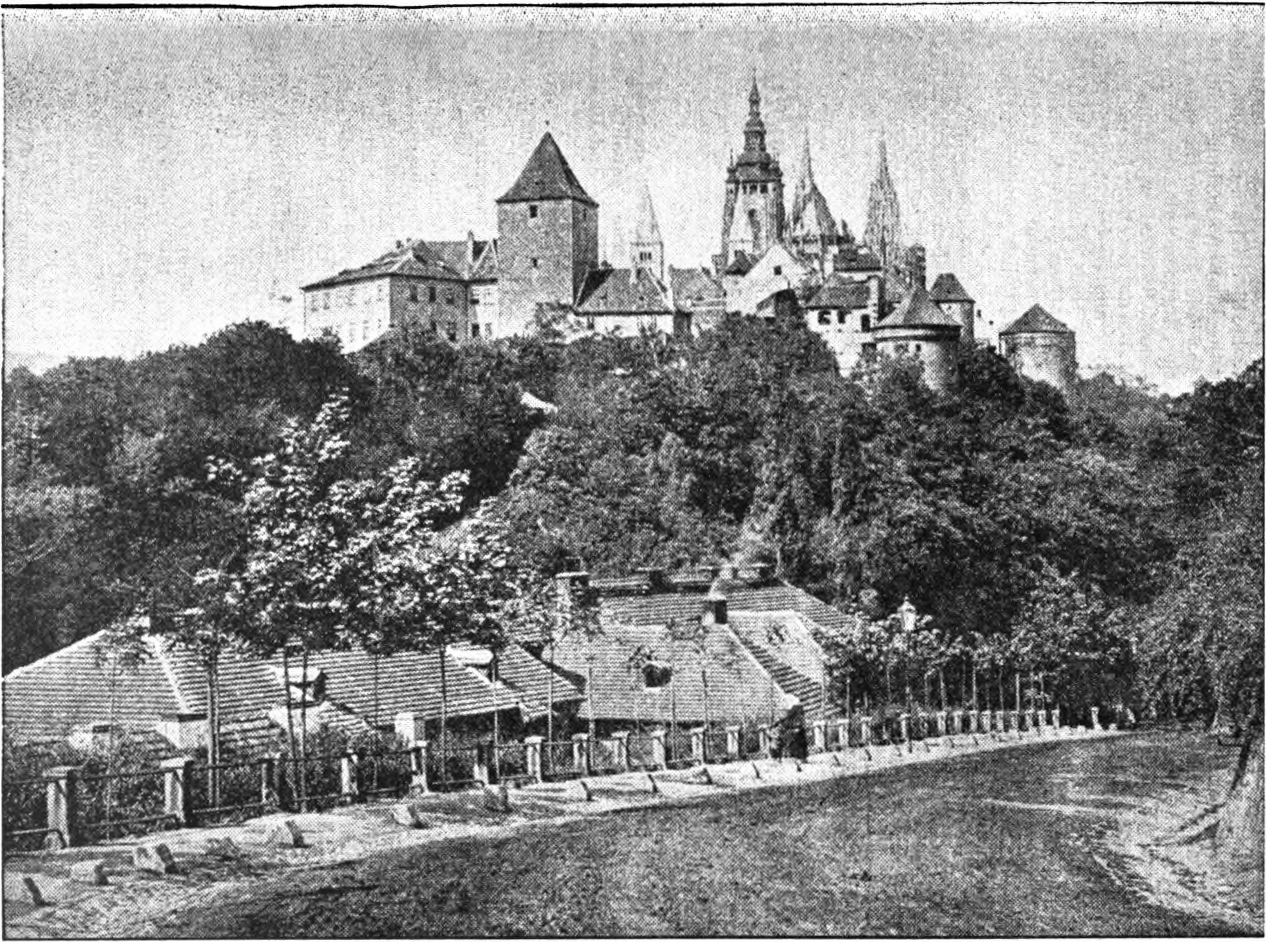
Prague castle and the settlement beneath in 1918

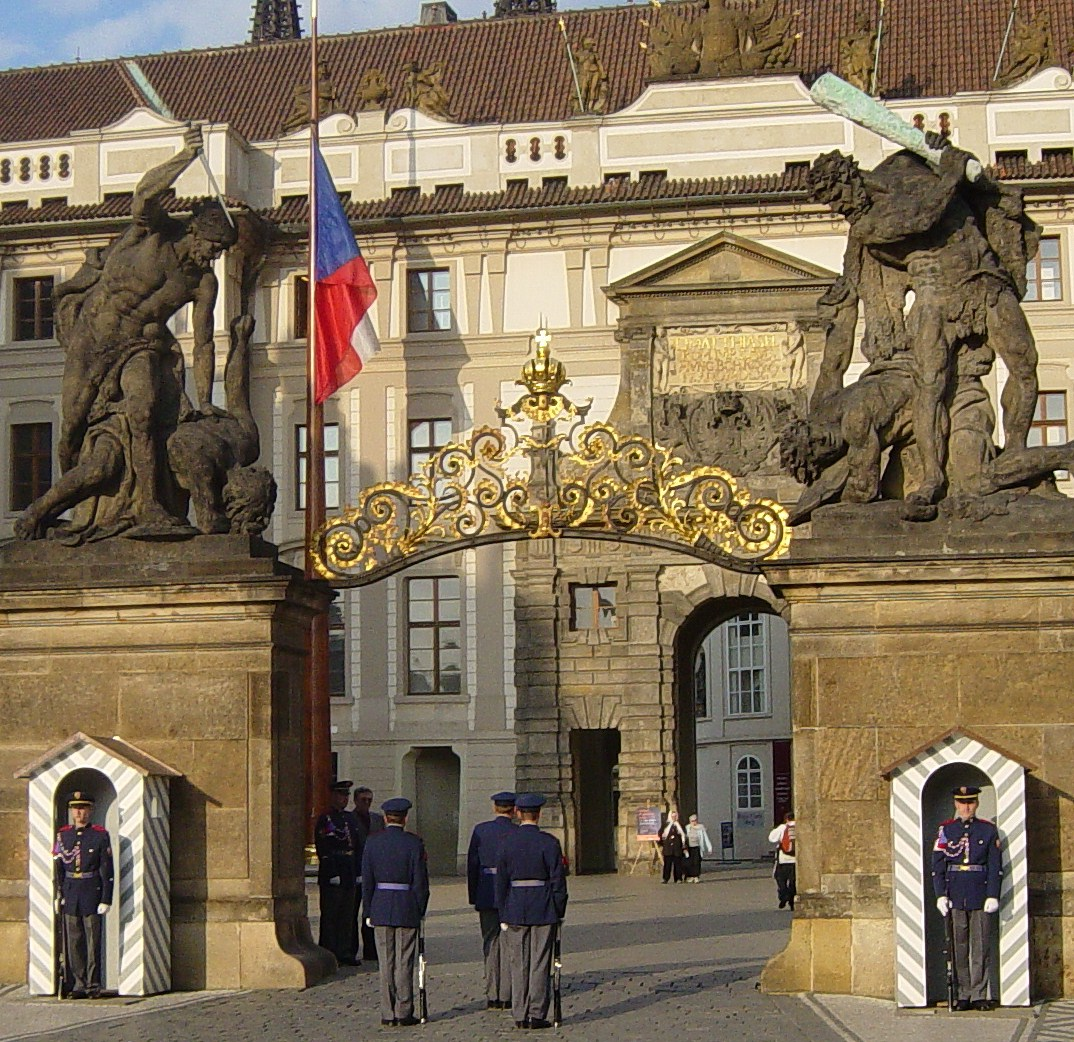
Changing of the Guards

In 1918, the castle became the seat of the president of the new Czechoslovak Republic, Tomáš Masaryk. The New Royal Palace and the gardens were renovated by Slovenian architect Jože Plečnik. In this period the St. Vitus Cathedral was finished on 28 September 1929. Renovations continued in 1936 under Plečnik's successor Pavel Janák.

==== Nazi German occupation ====
On 15 March 1939, shortly after Nazi Germany forced Czech President Emil Hácha (who suffered a heart attack during the negotiations) to hand his nation over to the Germans, Adolf Hitler spent a night in the Prague Castle, "proudly surveying his new possession."

During the Nazi occupation of Czechoslovakia in World War II, Prague Castle became the headquarters of Reinhard Heydrich, the Reich Protector of Bohemia and Moravia. According to a popular rumor, he is said to have placed the Bohemian crown on his head; old legends say a usurper who places the crown on his head is doomed to die within a year. Less than a year after assuming power, on 27 May 1942, Heydrich was ambushed during Operation Anthropoid, by British-trained Slovak and Czech resistance soldiers while on his way to the Castle, and died of his wounds, which became infected, a week later. Klaus, his firstborn son, died the next year in a traffic accident, also in line with the legend.

==== Communist and post-communist era ====
After the liberation of Czechoslovakia and the coup in 1948, the Castle housed the offices of the communist Czechoslovak government. After Czechoslovakia split in 1993 into the Czech Republic and Slovakia, the castle became the seat of the Head of State of the new Czech Republic. Similar to what Masaryk did with Plečnik, president Václav Havel commissioned Bořek Šípek to be the architect of post-communist improvements for Prague Castle, in particular of the facelift of the castle's gallery of paintings.

== Architectural styles of Prague Castle ==
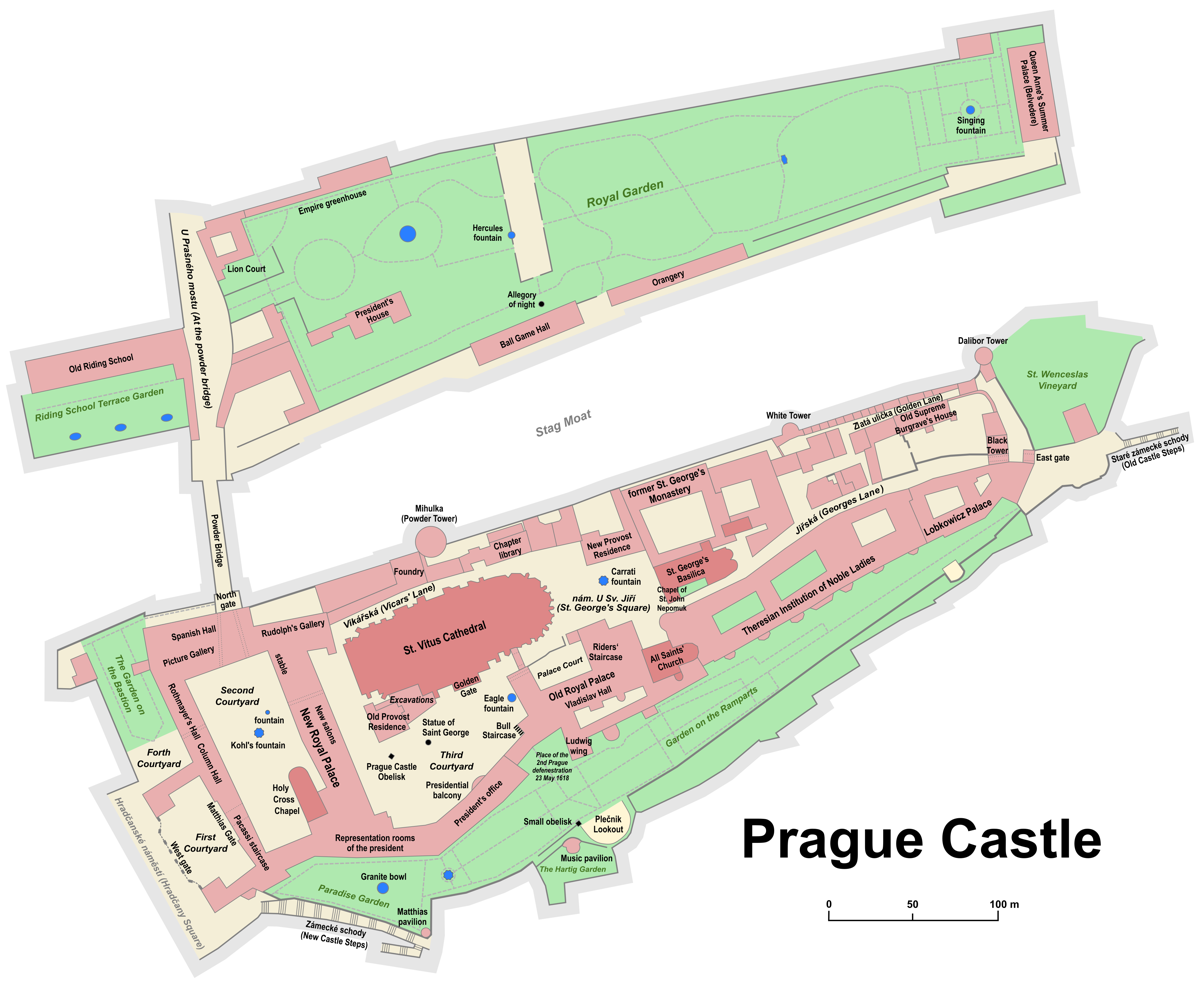
Map of Prague Castle

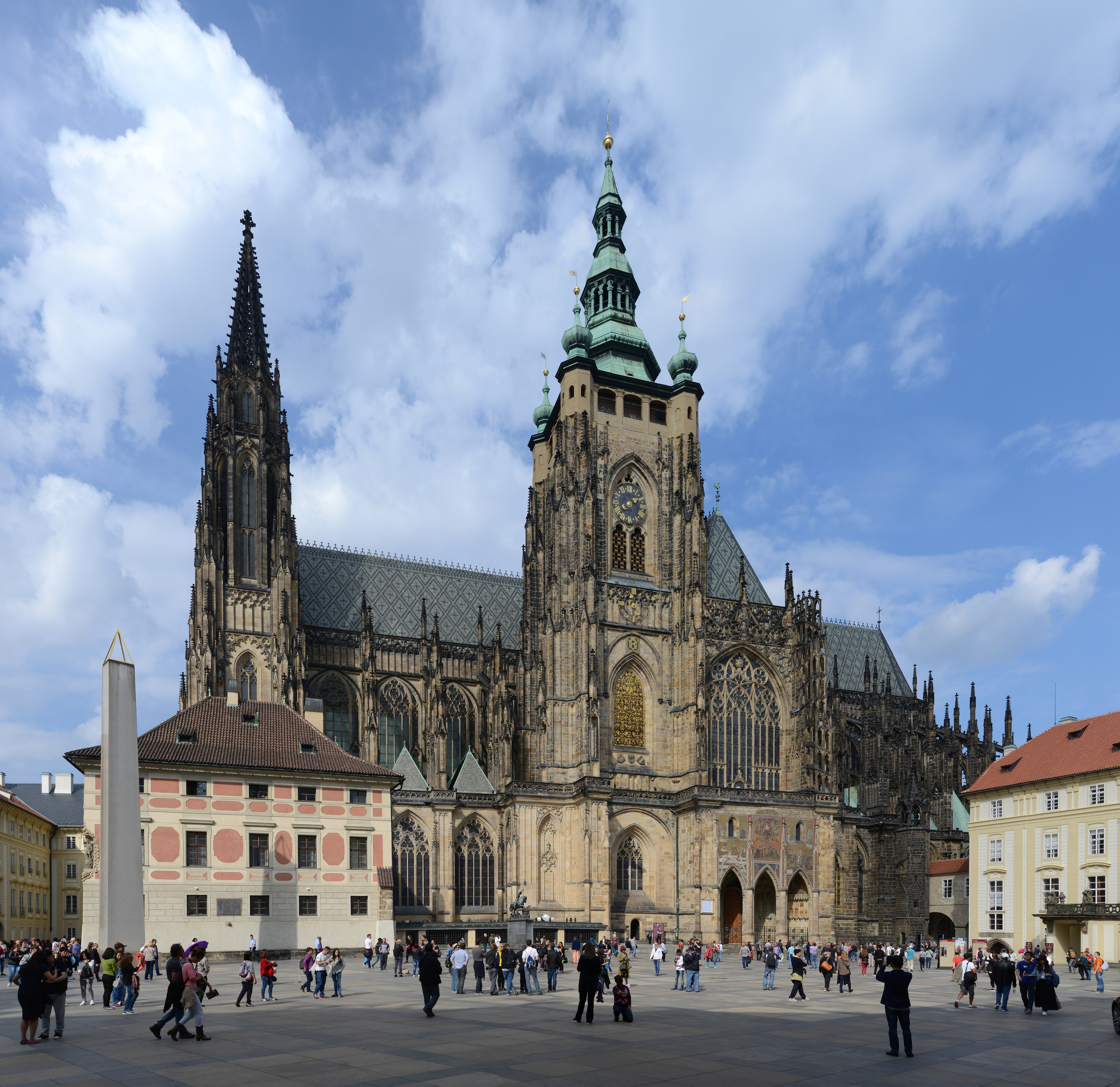
Saint Vitus Cathedral

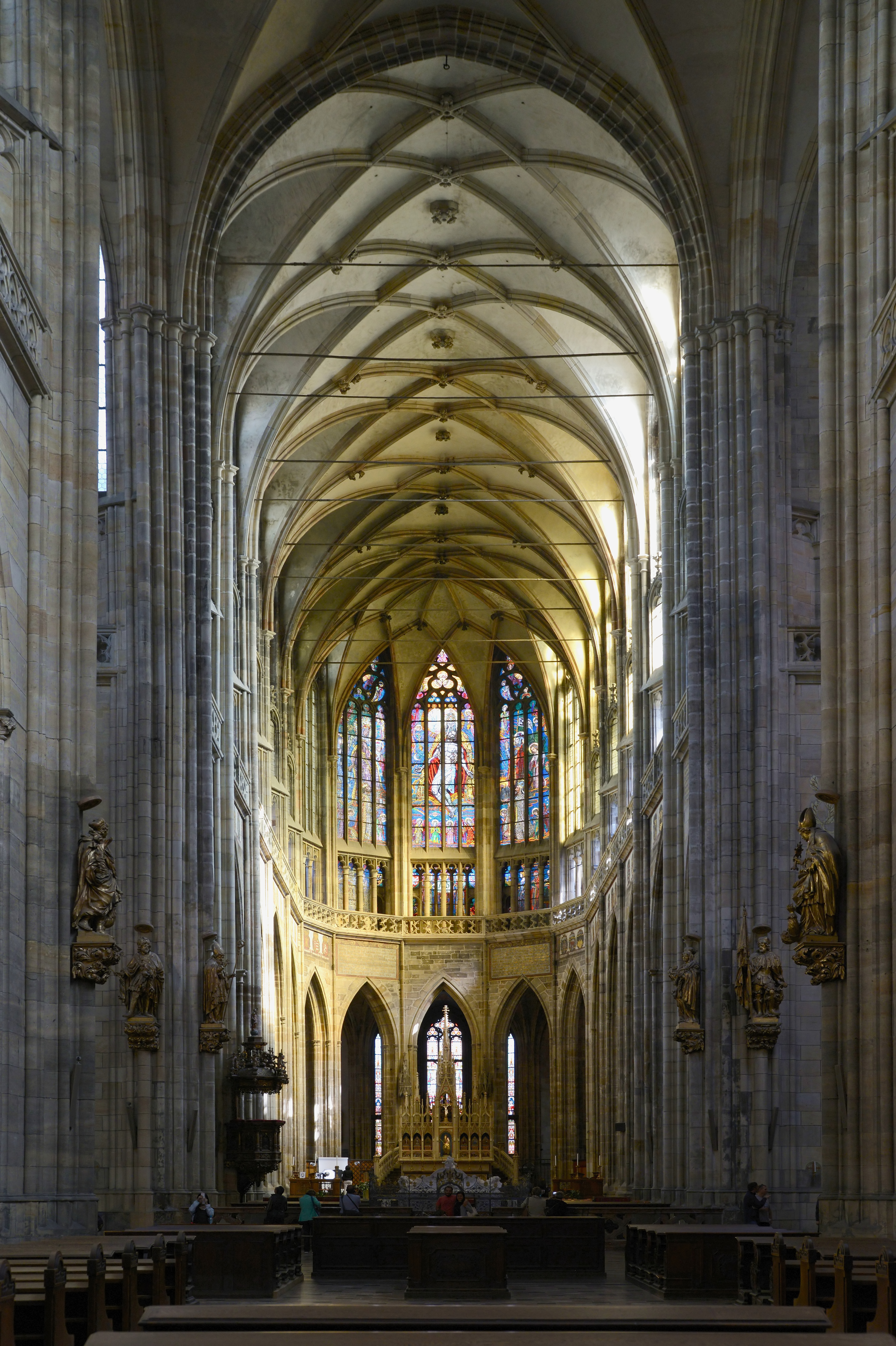
Main nave of the cathedral

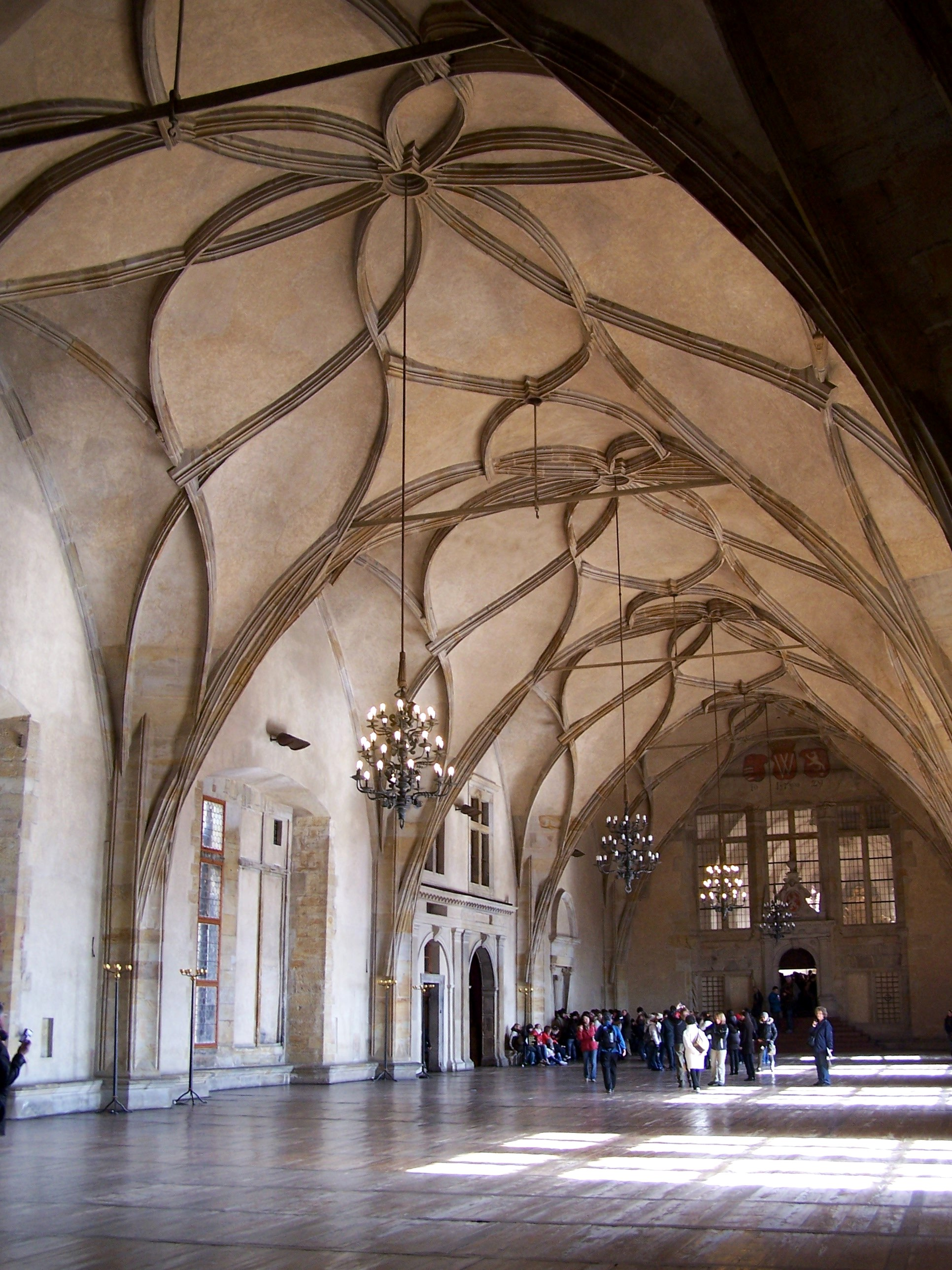
Vladislav Hall

Prague Castle's architecture is a unique blend of styles from different periods, reflecting its long and complex history. The castle buildings represent many of the architectural styles of the last millennium. Prague Castle includes Gothic St. Vitus Cathedral, Romanesque Basilica of St. George, a monastery and several palaces, gardens and defense towers. Most of the castle areas are open to tourists. The castle houses several museums, including the National Gallery collection of Bohemian baroque and mannerist art, exhibition dedicated to Czech history, Toy Museum and the picture gallery of Prague Castle, based on the collection of Rudolph II. The Summer Shakespeare Festival regularly takes place in the courtyard of Burgrave Palace.

The neighborhood around Prague Castle is called Hradčany.

=== Churches ===
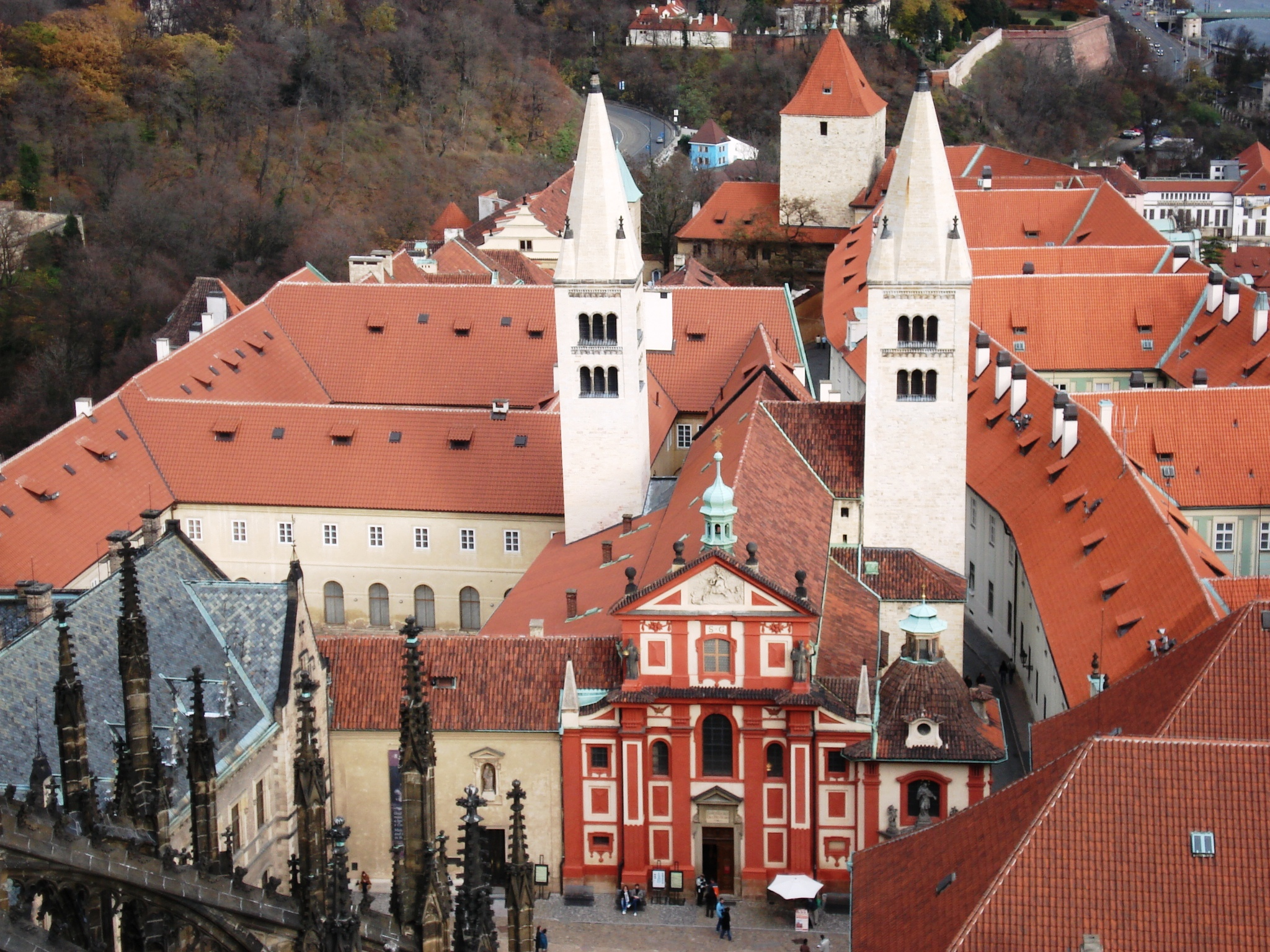
Basilica of St George

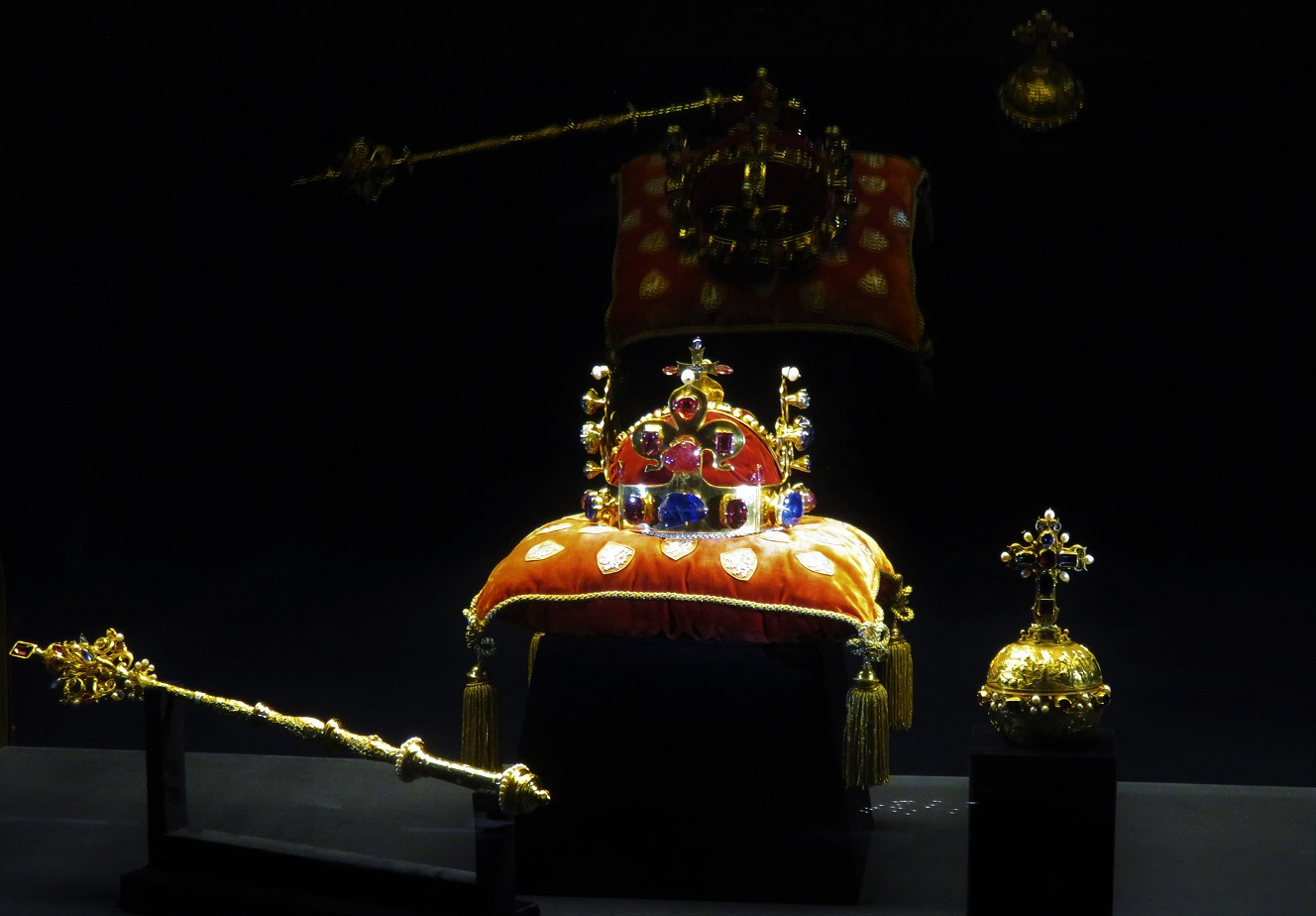
The Czech Crown Jewels are the fourth oldest in Europe, shown here, including a globus cruciger on the right

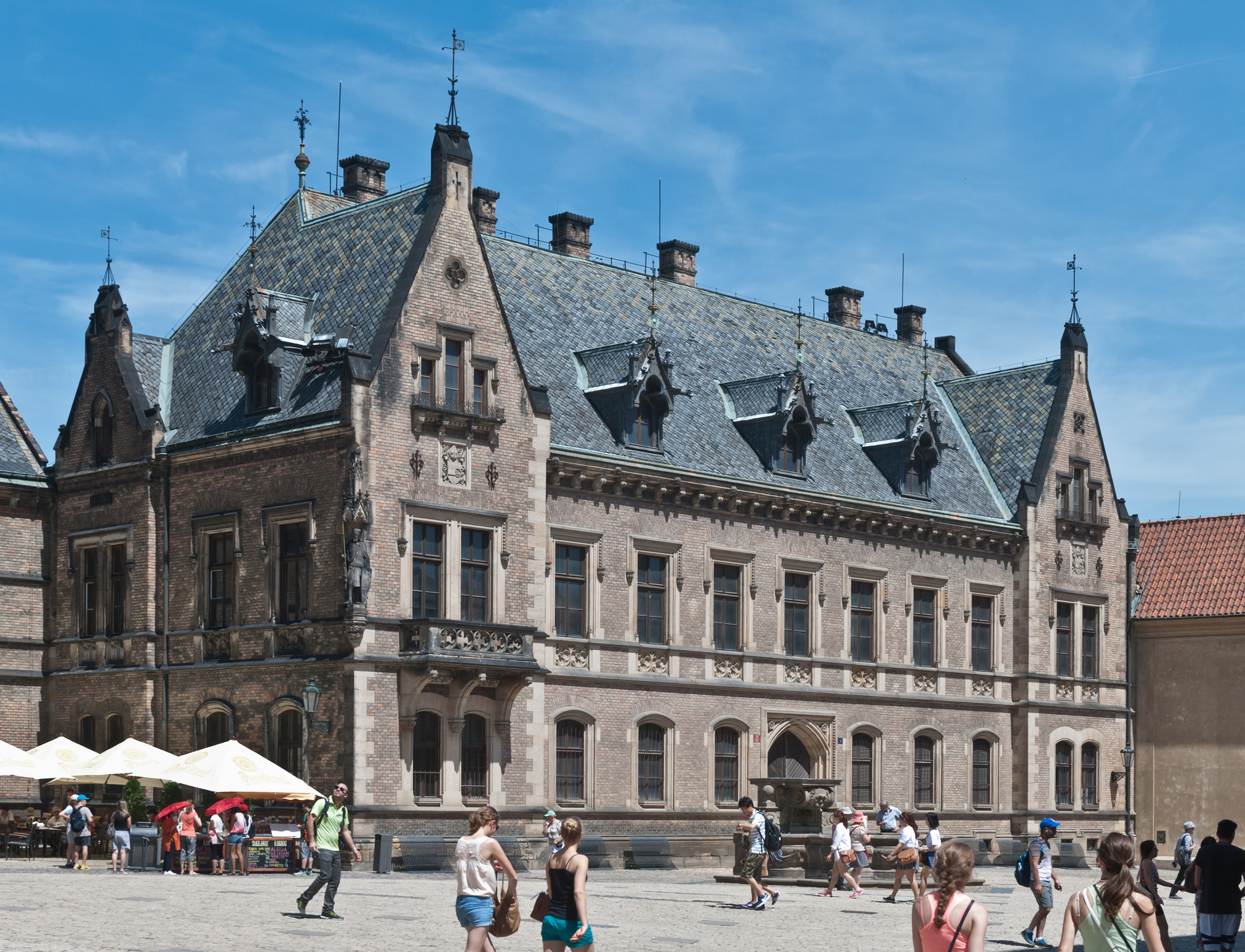
New Provost Residence

- Katedrála svatého Víta, Václava a Vojtěcha (St. Vitus Cathedral)
- Bazilika svatého Jiří (St. George's Basilica, Prague) and Klášter svatého Jiří (St. George's Convent, Prague), it is the oldest surviving church building within Prague Castle.
- Chrám Všech svatých (All Saints Church)
- Kaple svatého Kříže (Holy Cross Chapel)

=== Palaces ===
- Starý královský palác (Old Royal Palace)
- Letohrádek královny Anny (Queen Anne's Summer Palace, better known as the Belvedere)
- Lobkovický palác (Lobkowicz Palace, not to be confused with the German embassy in Malá Strana)
- Nový královský palác (New Royal Palace (Prague))

=== Halls ===
- Sloupová síň (Column Hall)
- Španělský sál (Spanish Hall)
- Rudolfova galerie (Rudolph's Gallery)
- Rothmayerův sál (Rothmayer's Hall)
- Vladislavský sál (Vladislav Hall)

=== Towers ===
- Bílá věž (White Tower (Prague Castle))
- Černá věž (Black Tower (Prague Castle))
- Daliborka (Dalibor Tower)
- Prašná věž or Mihulka (Mihulka)

=== Other buildings ===
- Zlatá ulička (Golden Lane)
- Staré purkrabství (Old Supreme Burgrave's House )
- Míčovna (Ball Game Hall)
- Jízdárna Pražského hradu (Riding School)
- Staré proboštství (Old Provost Residence )
- Nové proboštství (New Provost Residence)
- Obrazárna Pražského hradu (Picture Gallery of the Prague Castle)
- Konírna Pražského hradu (stable)
- Prašný most (Powder Bridge)

=== Gardens ===
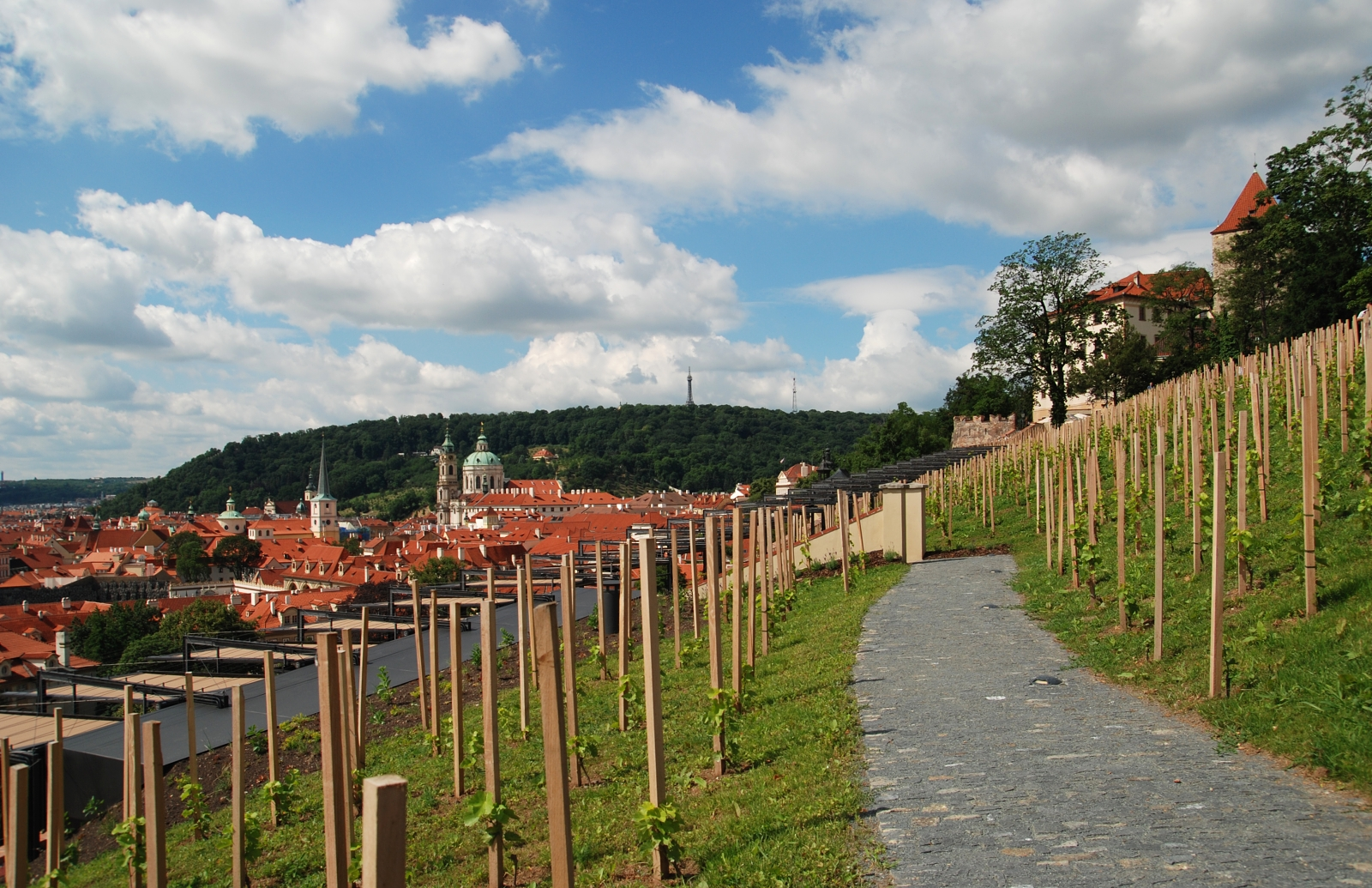
Svatováclavská vinice (St. Wenceslas' Vineyard) on east

- Královská zahrada (Royal Garden of Prague Castle)
  - Oranžérie (Orangery)
- Zahrada na terase Jízdárny (Riding School Terrace Garden)
- Zahrada Na Baště (The Garden on the Bastion)
- Jižní zahrady (South Gardens)
  - Rajská zahrada (Paradise Garden)
  - Zahrada Na Valech (Garden on the Ramparts)
  - Hartigovská zahrada (The Hartig Garden)
- Jelení příkop (Deer Moat)
- Svatováclavská vinice (St. Wenceslas vineyard)
- Produkční zahrady Pražského hradu (Horticultural Gardens)

== Structures ==
- Kohlova kašna (Kohl's Fountain)
- Matyášova brána (Matthias Gate)
- Prague Castle Obelisk
- Socha svatého Jiří (Statue of Saint George)

== See also ==
- Christiansborg Palace
- 16th-century Western domes
- Prague Castle skeleton
