= Sword of Saint Wenceslas =

Ceremonial sword

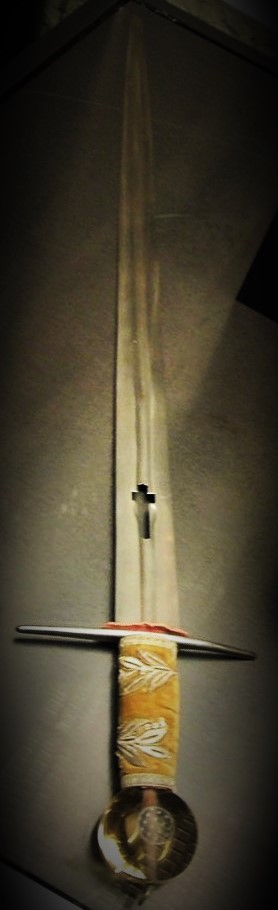
The Sword

The Sword of Saint Wenceslas (Czech: Meč svatého Václava) or the Coronation Sword of Bohemia (Korunovační meč Čech) is a ceremonial sword used in the Kingdom of Bohemia during coronation ceremonies in Prague. The blade of the Sword dates back to the 10th century, to the times of St. Wenceslaus. Together with the Coronation Cross it is sometimes considered to be a part of the Bohemian crown jewels. Unlike the proper crown jewels, the sword and the cross are permanently displayed as part of the Treasury of St. Vitus Cathedral in the Holy Cross Chapel at the Prague Castle.

== History ==
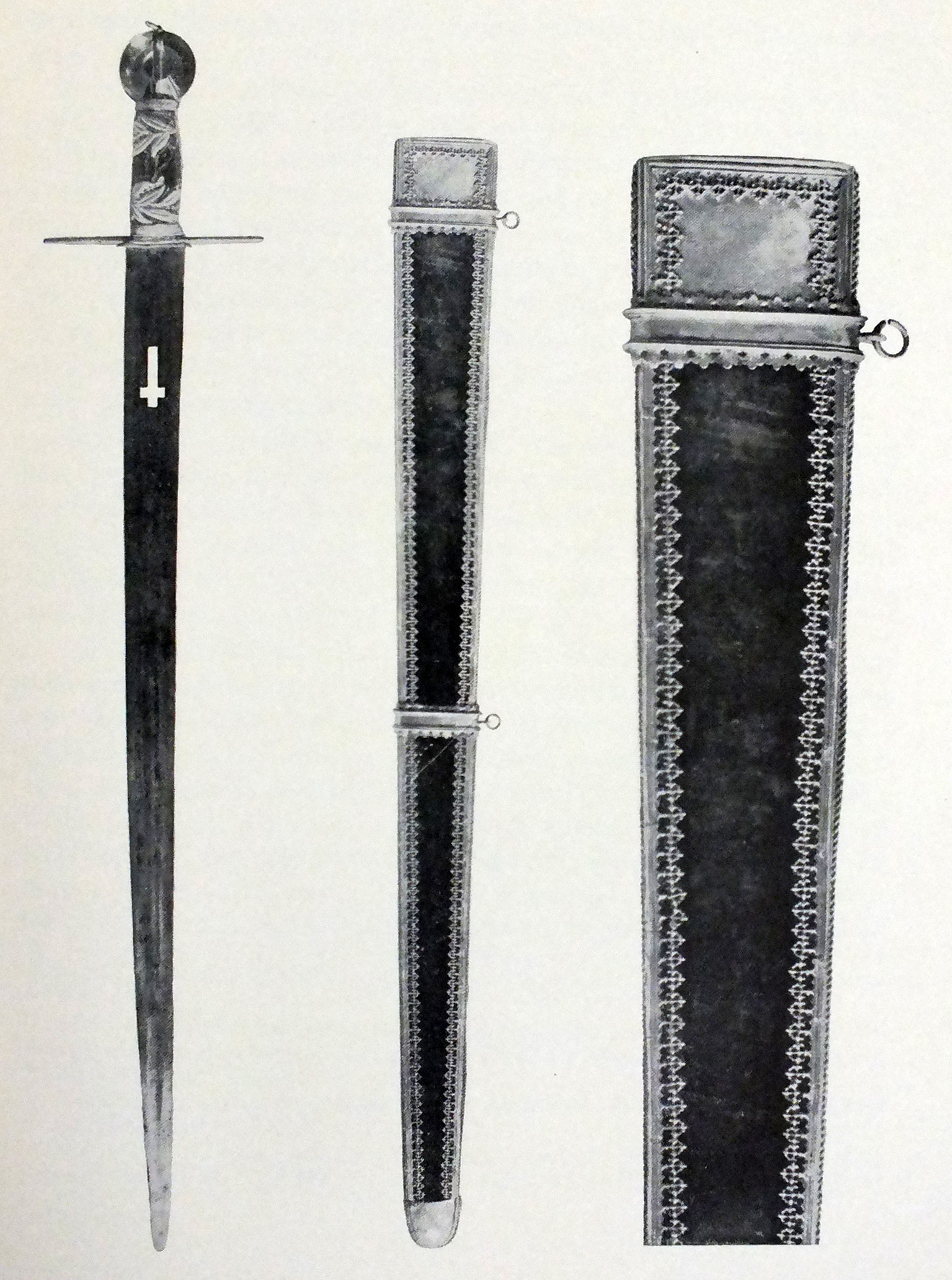
St. Wenceslas Sword

Until the 19th century it was believed that the sword was an authentic weapon used by Duke Wenceslas in the 10th century. Later, the sword was considered to be Gothic, made in the 14th century probably by Charles IV who made the new ceremonial crown, which was also dedicated to the main Czech patron saint, St. Wenceslaus. However, a recent detailed technological examination of the sword confirmed that the sword blade was made in the early Middle Ages (probably in the 10th century) and the sword thus really could have belonged to St. Wenceslas. The cross on the blade was probably made later in the Middle Ages and the guard and pommel were added perhaps in the 13th century. In the treasure of St. Vitus Cathedral there are preserved also a helmet and mail shirt, which most likely are Wenceslas' original armor as well.

The sword was first mentioned in 1333 in the articles of inventory of the Treasury of the St. Vitus Cathedral. It is not clear when the sword was first used during coronations but in the Coronation Ordo written by Charles IV (maybe in 1347), the sword already had its ceremonial role. The sword was carried by the supreme marshal of the Bohemian Kingdom in front of the king alongside the other crown jewels in the ceremonial procession to the main altar of Prague Cathedral. Before the king was crowned, he was given the blessed sword for a while and after the coronation itself, the sword was used for the purpose of granting knighthoods at the end of the coronation Mass.

== Description ==
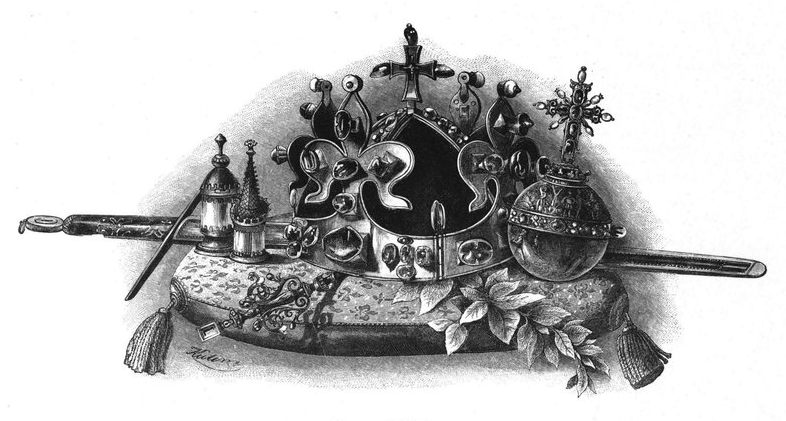
The Coronation Sword as part of the Czech Crown Jewels

The iron blade length is 76 cm (30 in), at the widest point is 45 mm (1.8 in) and has a ripped hole in a cross shape (45 mm × 20 mm (1.77 in × 0.79 in)). The wooden handle is covered with yellow-brown fabric and velvet embroidered with the ornament of laurel twigs with thick silver thread.
