= Nemiya Helmet =

11th-century conical helmet from present-day Ukraine

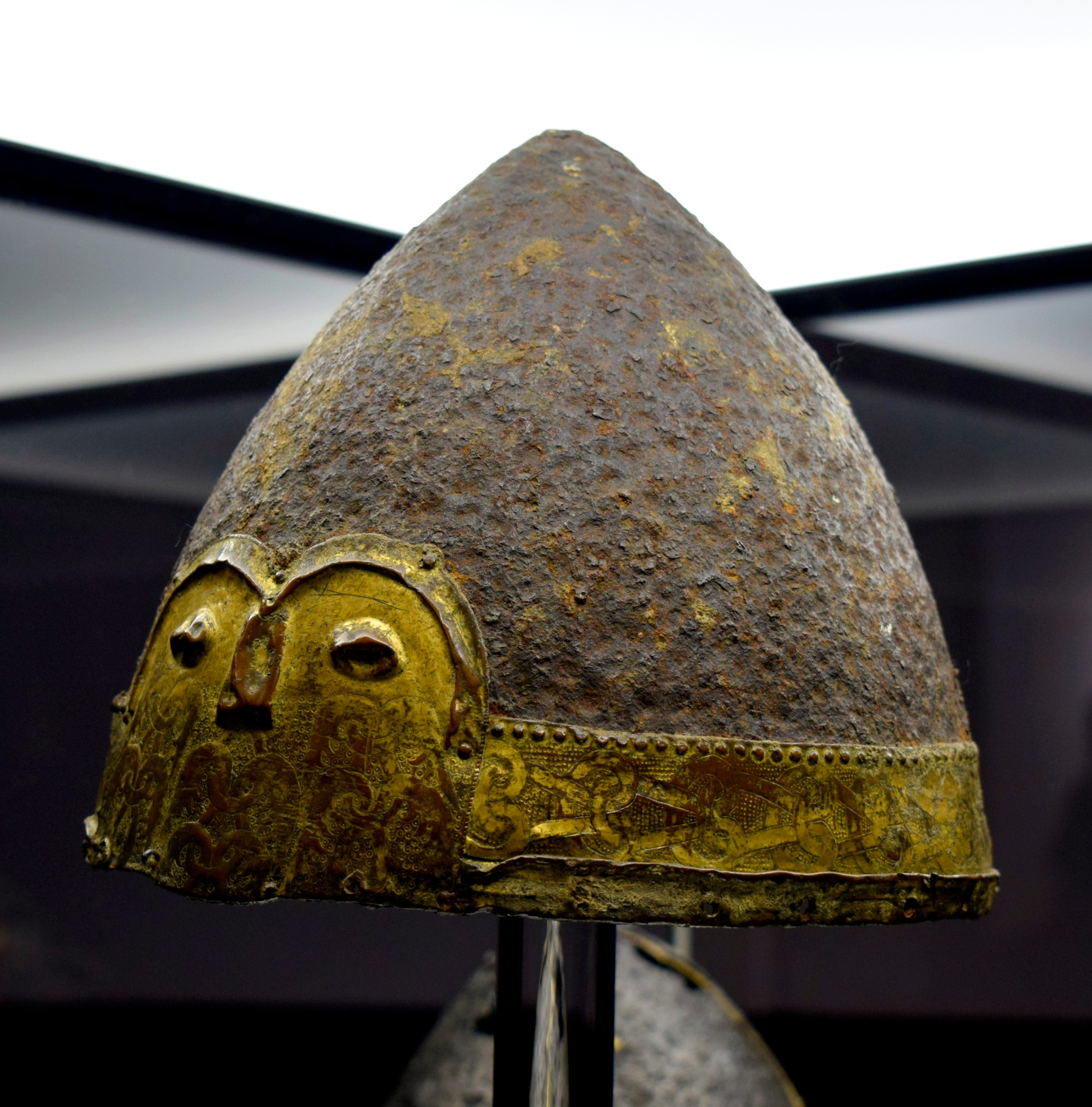
- The Nemiya Helmet
- Type: one-piece conical combat helmet
- Material: iron, copper, gold
- Height: 22.5 cm (8.9 in)
- Width: 23 cm (9.1 in)
- Symbols: human face, Hercules knot
- Created: c. 11th century
- Discovered: 1892; Nemiia, Ukraine
- Present location: Déri Museum, Debrecen
- Culture: unknown

The Nemiya Helmet is a conical helmet from the 11th century that was discovered near the Dniester river on the territory of present-day Ukraine. It is an outstanding example of medieval metalworking, and a testimony of the importance of the Dniester trade route in Southeastern Europe.

== History ==
The helmet was found in 1892 in Nemiya village near the confluence of the Dniester and the Nemiya river during railway construction works. At the time the area belonged to the Podolia Governorate of the Russian Empire. The find entered the collection of the museum in Kamenets-Podolskiy. Apparently lost during the First World War, it was only known from one black and white photograph at the time of its first scientific publication by Soviet archaeologist Anatoly Kirpichnikov in 1962. He dated the artefact tentatively to the 11th-century, and claimed that its conical shape was typical of European helmets of the time, and its decoration was similar to Slavic ornamental art although unique in its pattern.

The helmet was re-discovered in the collection of the Déri Museum in Debrecen, Hungary, and published by István Erdélyi in 1968. The helmet was first shown to the public at the Long Night of Museums on 21 June 2014 when a new scientific research project was launched. In 2022-2023 it was the centrepiece of a temporary exhibition in the Déri Museum about the historical connections between the Vikings and the Carpathian Basin during the early Middle Ages.

Erdélyi accepted Kirpichnikov's tentative dating but claimed that the cultural affiliation of the helmet was impossible to ascertain. He interpreted both the interlaced knots and the human mask motifs as symbols of protection, used widely by craftsmen in the early Middle Ages. Erdélyi regarded the artefact as a fine example of the cross-cultural relations between Normans and the Rus' people, or between the Rus' and nomadic steppe peoples.

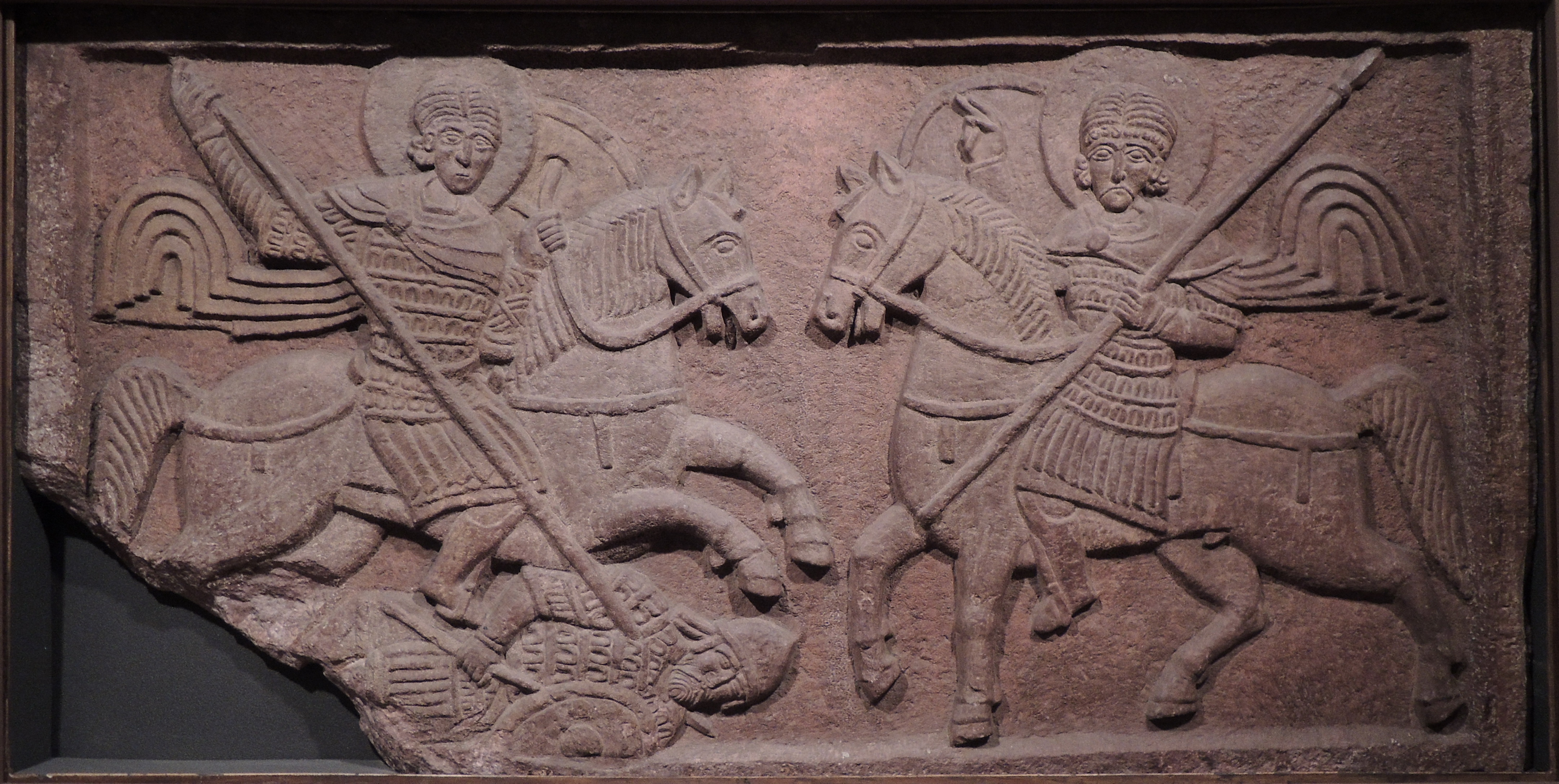
11th-century stone slab from Kyiv depicting warrior saints, their fallen enemy wears a conical helmet

After its existence became more widely known, a scholarly debate has emerged about its origin and background. Kirpichnikov said that having made with extreme artistry, it represented a new phase in the development of conical helmets. He also emphasized the pan-European character of the type, and suggested that the Nemiya Helmet was most plausibly of Central European origin. David Nicolle argued that its typically European form meant that a Byzantine or even Hungarian origin was likely although he supposed that it was found in a Pecheneg site and received a later Pecheneg/Turkish decoration. Michael Gorelik considered it a 10th-century work combining two different styles of ornamentation: Hungarian (on the front) and Scandinavian (on the border). Raffaele D'Amato proposed that the helmet itself was a Byzantine work of the highest quality, decorated by a Varangian craftsman on the plate with typical Scandinavian ornamentation and a stylised mask on the front, the latter having parallels on the helmet of Yasenovo. Mykoła Kozak proposed that, "given the lack of finds of helmets of this type from the territory of Ukraine, as well as from the former Rus' lands in general, Western analogies should be considered", like the helmets shown on the Bayeux Tapestry (conventionally called Norman type helmets).

In the 11th century Nemiya belonged to the wider geographic area of the Kievan Rus', and was located on the important Dniester trade route, part of the Amber Road between the Baltic and the Black Sea. Decorated helmets were rare and expensive objects, owned by members of the military elite. Conical helmets were depicted on artworks from the Kievan Rus'. An important example is a stone slab from St. Michael's Golden-Domed Monastery in Kyiv, possibly depicting the military saints Demetrios and Nestor killing a gladiator, dated to around 1062 (today in the State Tretyakov Gallery, Moscow). Erdélyi called attention to a bone tablet found in Plisnesk in 1940 with a relief showing a warrior in full armour and a conical helmet on his head (dated to the 11th-12th centuries, now in the Lviv Historical Museum).

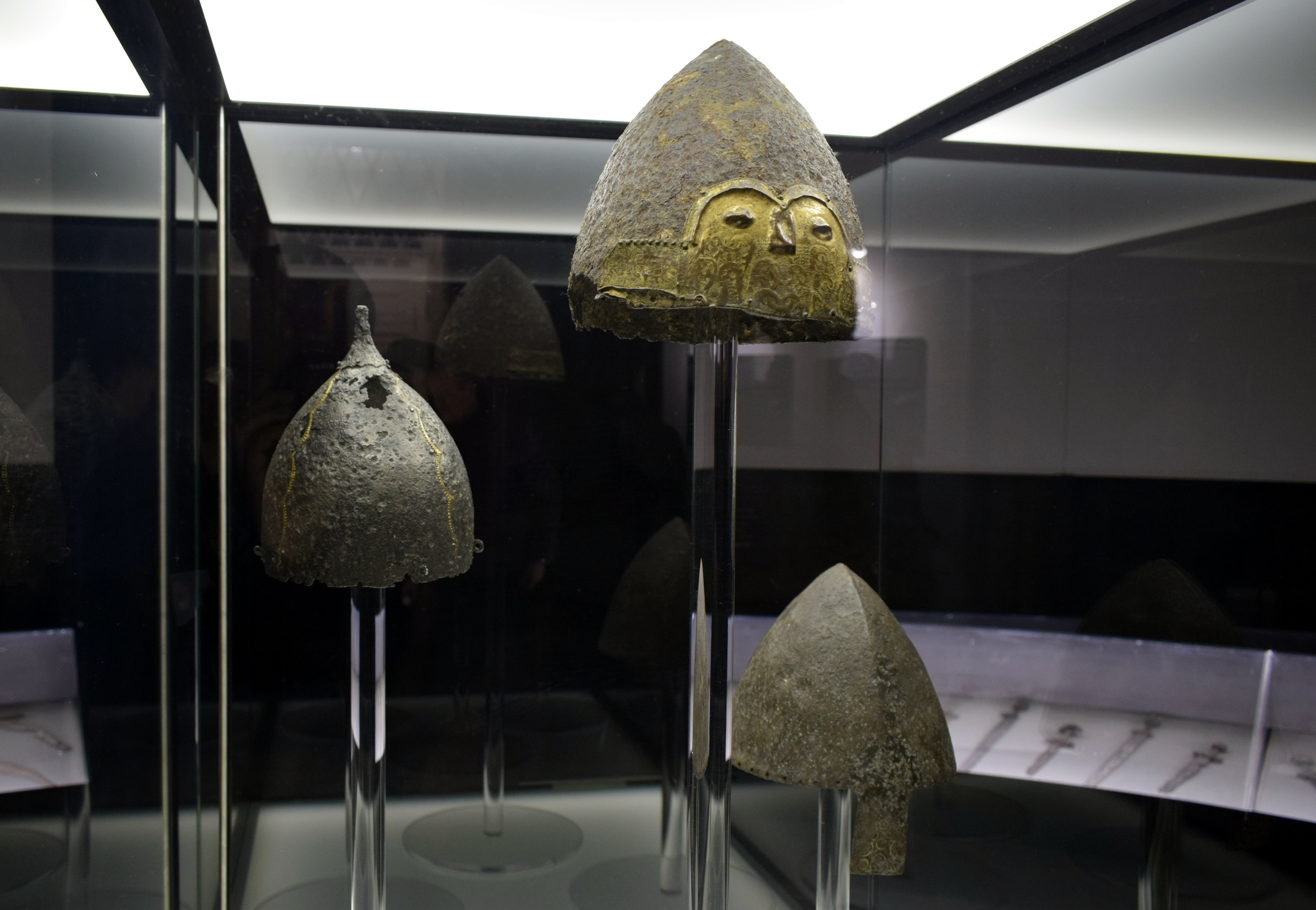
The Nemiya Helmet on the exhibition of the Déri Museum in 2022 with a 10th-century iron helmet from Pécs, Hungary and an 11th-century iron helmet, probably from the Novgorod area

The Nemiya Helmet has few parallels among the surviving military artefacts of early medieval Eastern and Southeastern Europe. The number of helmets found from that era remains very limited. The famous Helmet of St. Wenceslas, a 10th-century single-piece conical helmet in the Treasury of St. Vitus Cathedral, is similar in shape and has a decorated browband with intertwined loops which are also present on the decorated band of the Nemiya Helmet. The most probable source of this ornamentation is Scandinavia although other regions of Eastern Europe can be potential candidates. At the time of its first publication by Erdélyi the closest analogies known to him were the 11th-century, unadorned helmet from Olomouc (in the Kunsthistorisches Museum, Vienna) and another one in the Wilczkow Collection. Simple conical helmets were also found on the territory of present-day Poland, most importantly the one-piece iron helmet discovered in Lake Lednica in 1959. D'Amato called attention to a one-pieced conical helmet from Verkhne Ychenkov found in a Pecheneg barrow in Russia and the helmet of Babychi from a Nomad grave in Ukraine, both later pieces with a different style of ornamentation. The 2022 exhibition of the Déri Museum presented the Nemiya Helmet together with two similar conical pieces: a 10th-century, four-plated iron helmet from Hungary (collections of the Janus Pannonius Museum, Pécs), and an 11th-century one-piece iron helmet, probably from the Novgorod area (in private collection).

The most closely related object to the Nemiya Helmet was discovered in Romania during the construction works of the Pașcani hydropower project on the Siret river in 2010. This helmet is comparable structurally and geographically; it also contains a similar stylized human mask and ornamentation along the lower edge but it was made of several riveted parts (the lost artefact was recovered in 2021).

== Description ==
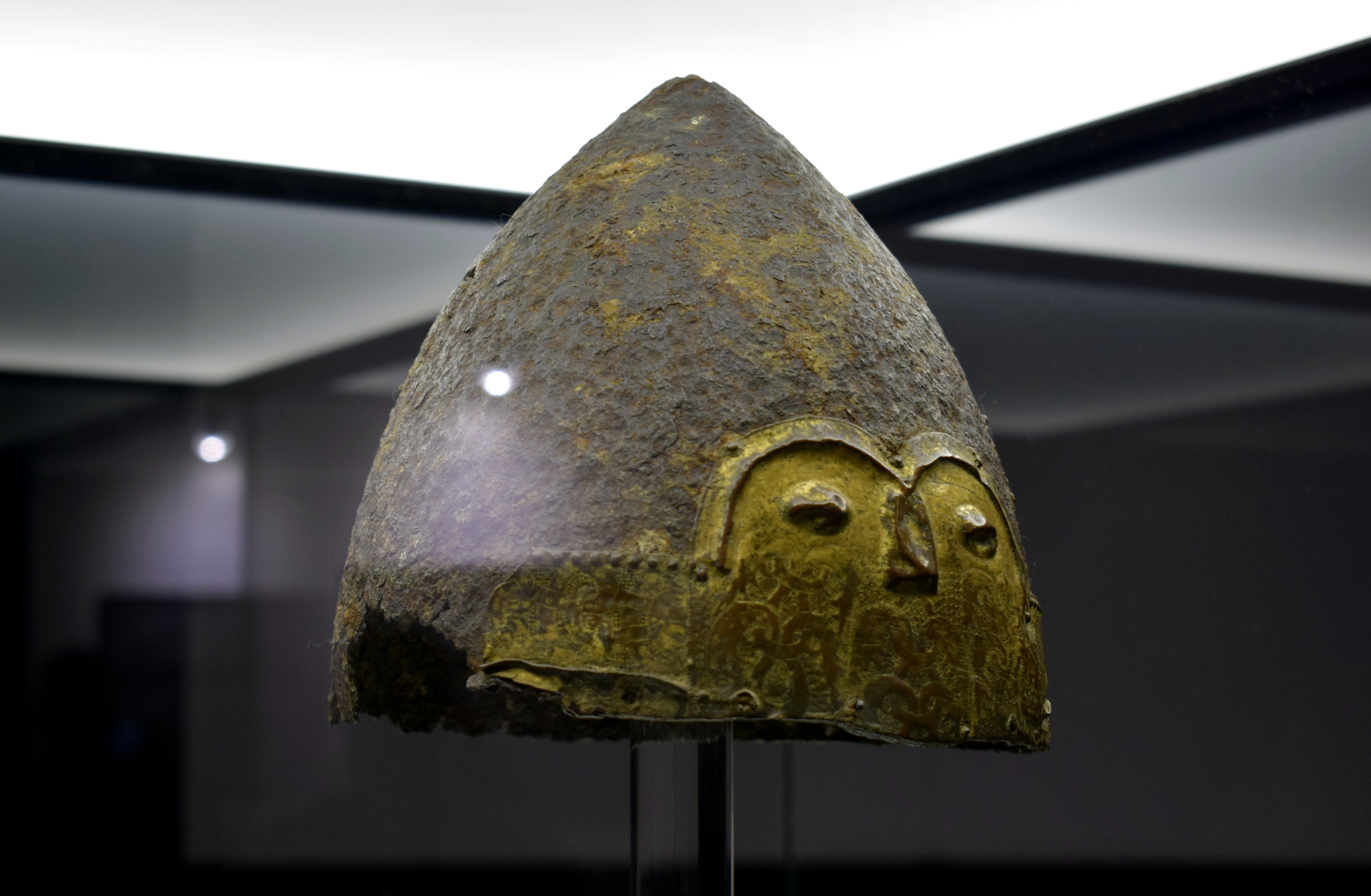
The side of the helmet is damaged

The egg-shaped conical helmet was forged from a single piece of iron. A 3.30 centimetres (1.30 in) wide strip of gilded copper plate is riveted around its brow. The browplate is highly decorated with an engraved design, composed of one variation of the Hercules knot on a dotted background; the front plate has a similar ornament combining knotted vegetal patterns and a human mask. The front plate has a stamped background forming a tapestry of small circles. The nose protection is missing. As appears from the holes throughout the brim, there was mail attached to protect the warrior's neck. A small protruding ring is still visible on the lower part of the forehead plate; similar rings probably served for the attachment of the corselet, and contributed to securing the browplate as Ω-shaped rivets.

The helmet is preserved in good condition but the decorative strip is largely missing on the right side where the lower part has been damaged.

== Bibliography ==
- Kozak, Mykoła (1 June 2021). "Шолом як елемент захисного спорядження професійного воїна у Галицькій та Волинській землях у Х-ХІІ ст.: проблема «латинських шоломів»" [The Helmet as an Element of Protective Equipment of a Professional Warrior in the Halych and Volyn' Lands in the 10th–12th Centuries: the Problem of 'Latin Helmets']. Tabularium Historiae (in Ukrainian). 9: 71–85. doi:10.34767/TH.2021.09.03. ISSN 2543-8433.
