= Coronation Cross of Bohemia =

Relic of the Crown of Bohemia

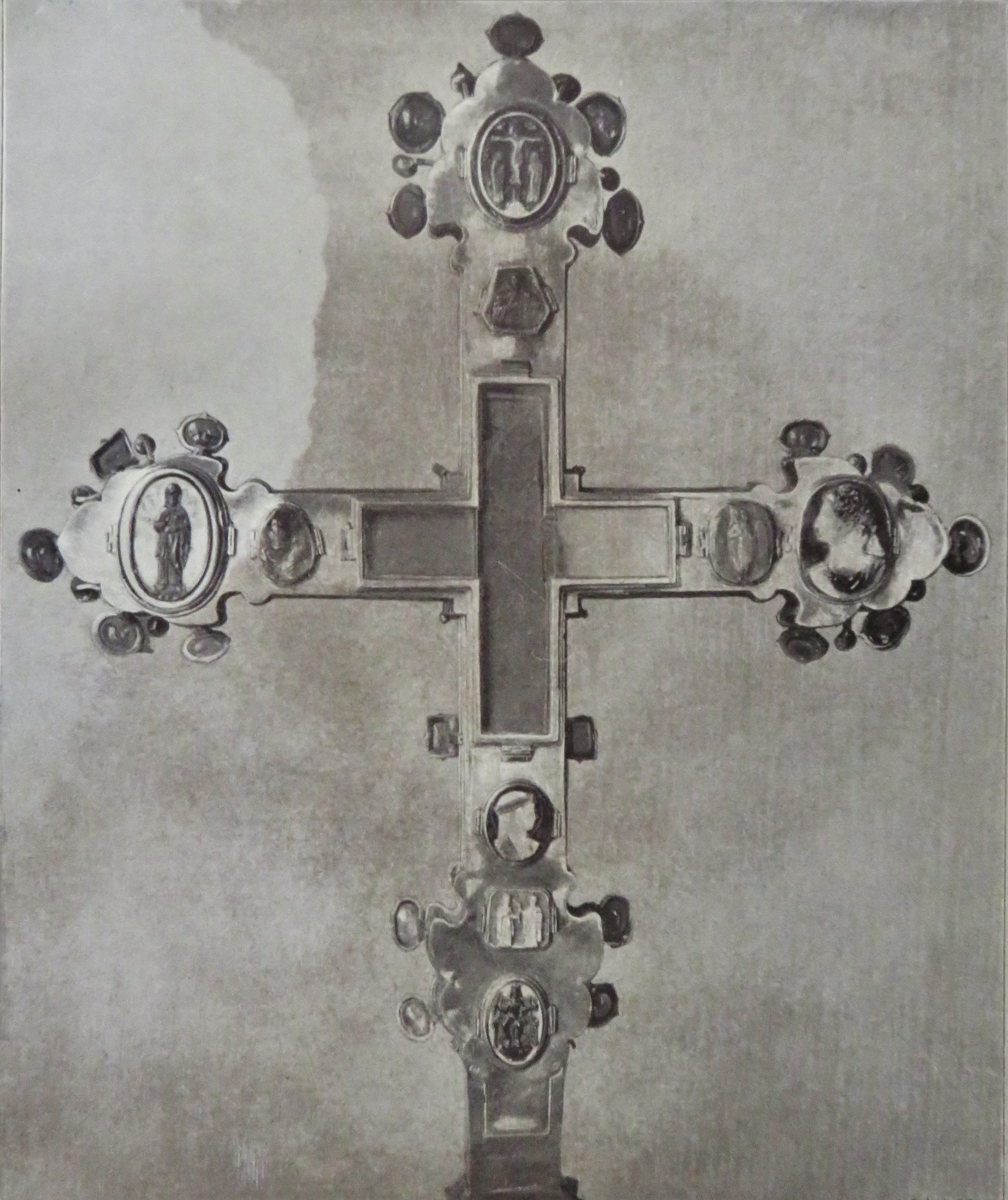
Back side of the Coronation Cross (picture taken in 1903)

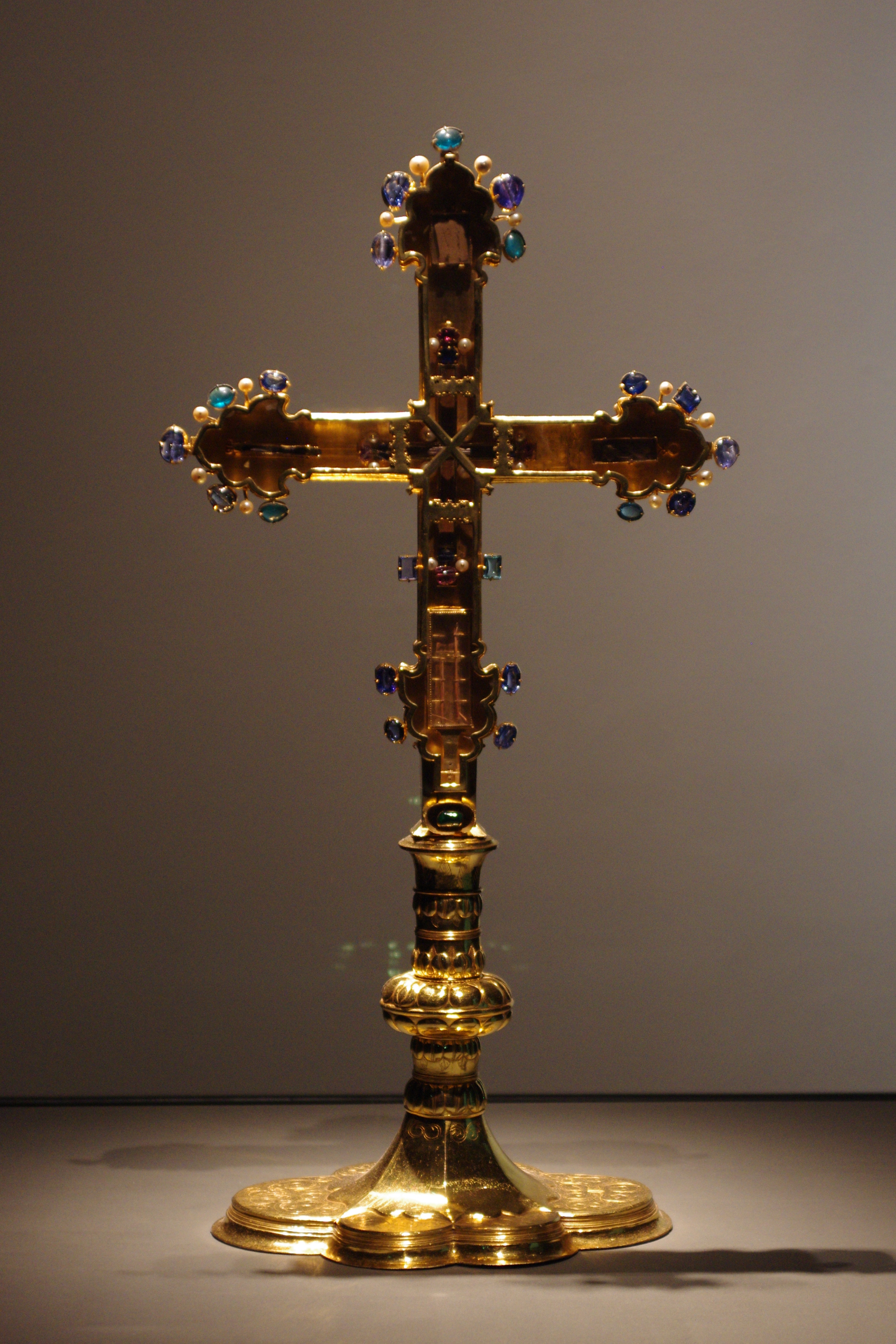
A cross from front side.

The Coronation Cross of Bohemia (Czech: Korunovační kříž Čech) or the Gold Reliquary Cross (Zlatý kříž relikviáře) is the most precious object of the Treasury of St. Vitus Cathedral in Prague. It is usually exhibited together with the Bohemian crown jewels and is sometimes considered to be part of them. It is a gold reliquary in shape of a cross, which was created to contain the most valuable relics of the Kingdom of Bohemia. The cross was made by order of Charles IV, probably around 1354. The Reliquary Cross was not originally part of the St. Vitus Treasury, but belonged to the Treasury of Karlštejn Castle. Since 1645 it has been permanently in Prague and became part of the St. Vitus Treasury. The cross was used during the coronations of Bohemian kings in St. Vitus Cathedral, although it was not originally made for this purpose.

== Description ==
The cross was made of gold plates by court goldsmiths. The entire front is covered with a rock crystal plate that allows one to see the relics of the Crucifixion of Christ: wood from the Holy Cross, thorns, a part of the sponge, rope, and a nail. The sides of the cross are lined with sapphires that are set in such a way so that light could penetrate them, thus creating a halo. The back of the cross is adorned with engraved gem cameos with beautiful reliefs that date from antiquity to the 12th century and cover small compartments for other precious relics. In the middle of the back of the cross, there is a small rock crystal window with another part of the wood from Christ's cross.
