= Bohemian crown jewels =

Jewelry on the crown of Saint Wenceslas

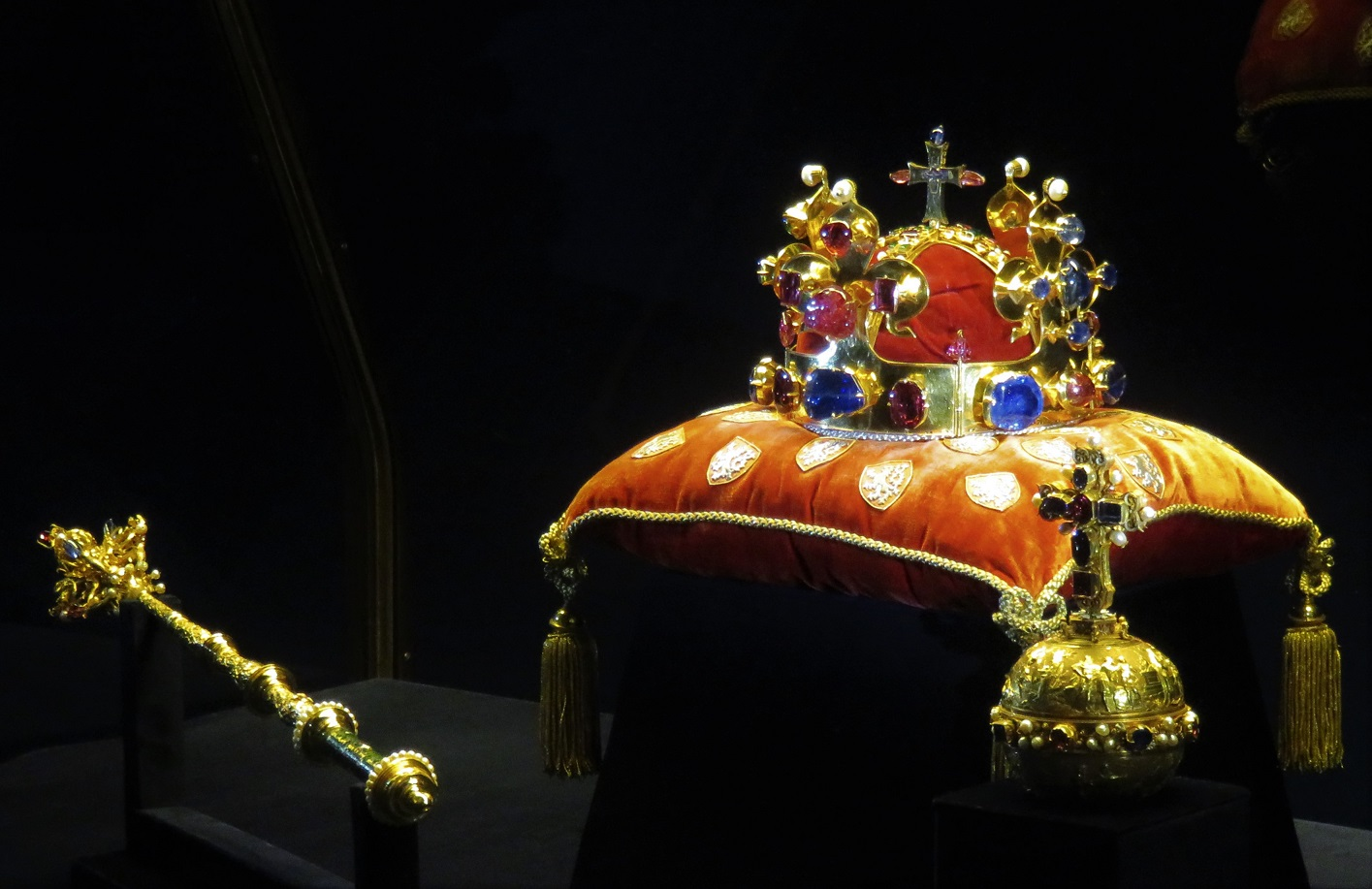
Crown jewels of Bohemia

The Bohemian crown jewels, also called the Czech crown jewels (Czech: české korunovační klenoty), include the Crown of Saint Wenceslas (Svatováclavská koruna), the royal orb and sceptre, the coronation vestments of the Kings of Bohemia, the gold reliquary cross, and St. Wenceslas' sword. They were originally held in Prague and Karlštejn Castle, designed in the 14th century by Matthias of Arras. Since 1791 they have been stored in St. Vitus Cathedral at Prague Castle. Reproductions of the jewels are permanently exhibited in the historical exposition at the former royal palace in the castle. The crown was made for the coronation of Charles IV in 1347, making it the fourth oldest in Europe.

== Description ==
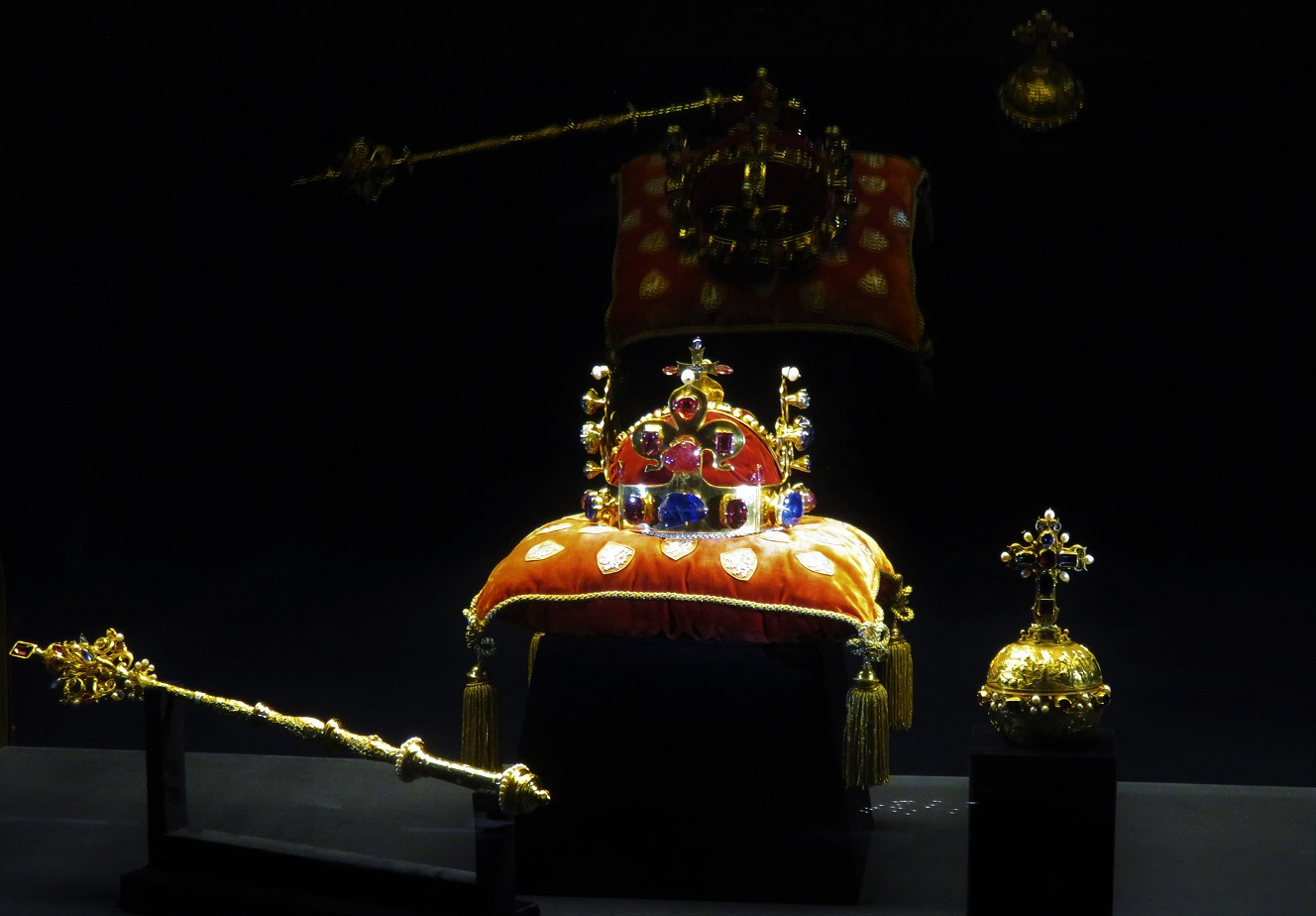
Bohemian crown jewels

The crown has an unusual design, with vertical fleurs-de-lis standing at the front, back and sides. Made from 22-carat gold and a set of precious 19 sapphires, 30 emeralds, 44 spinels, 20 pearls, 1 ruby, 1 rubellite and 1 aquamarine, it weighs 2475 g. At the top of the crown is the cross, which reportedly stores a thorn from Christ's crown of thorns. Unlike in most later crowns, the cross does not stand on a monde.

The Royal sceptre is made from 18-carat gold, 4 sapphires, 5 spinels and 62 pearls with an extra large spinel mounted on top of the sceptre; it weighs 1013 g. The Royal orb is also made from 18-carat gold, 8 sapphires, 6 spinels and 31 pearls. It weighs 780 g and is decorated with wrought relief scenes from the Old Testament and the Book of Genesis. The Coronation robe was used from 1653 until 1836. It is made from precious silky red material called "zlatohlav" and is lined with ermine (fur of the stoat). The robe is stored separately from jewelry in a specially air conditioned repository.

For the coronation ceremonies, St. Wenceslas' sword, a typical Gothic weapon, was used. The first mention of the sword reported in historical records is in 1333, but the blade dates back to the 10th century, while the hilt is from the 13th century and textiles are probably from the time of Charles IV. The iron blade length is 76 cm, at the widest point is 45 mm and has a ripped hole in a cross shape (45 × 20 mm). The wooden handle is covered with yellow-brown fabric and velvet embroidered with the ornament of laurel twigs with thick silver thread. After coronation ceremonies, the sword was used for the purpose of granting knighthoods.

The oldest leather case for the crown was made for Charles IV in 1347. On top are inscribed four symbols: the Imperial eagle, Bohemian lion, the coat of arms of Arnošt of Pardubice and emblem of the Archbishopric of Prague.

The door to crown jewels chamber, and likewise the iron safe, is hardly accessible and has seven locks. There are seven holders of the keys: the President of the Czech Republic, the Speaker of the Chamber of Deputies, the President of the Senate, the Prime Minister, the Mayor of Prague, the Archbishop of Prague, and the Dean of the Metropolitan Chapter of St. Vitus Cathedral in Prague, who must all convene to facilitate opening the impenetrable door and coffer.

== History ==
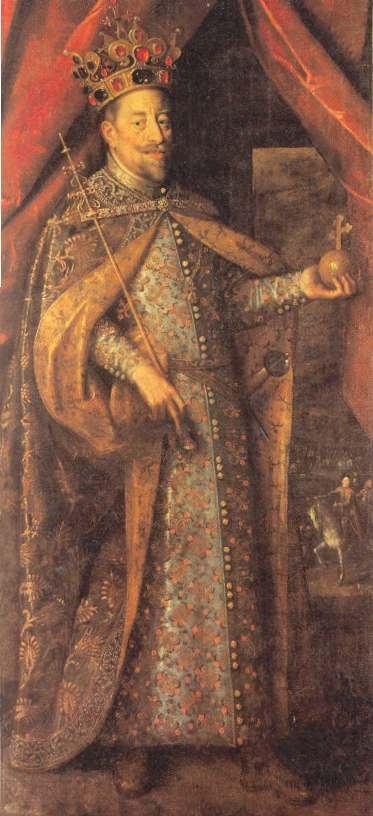
Matthias, Holy Roman Emperor, wearing the original crown jewels

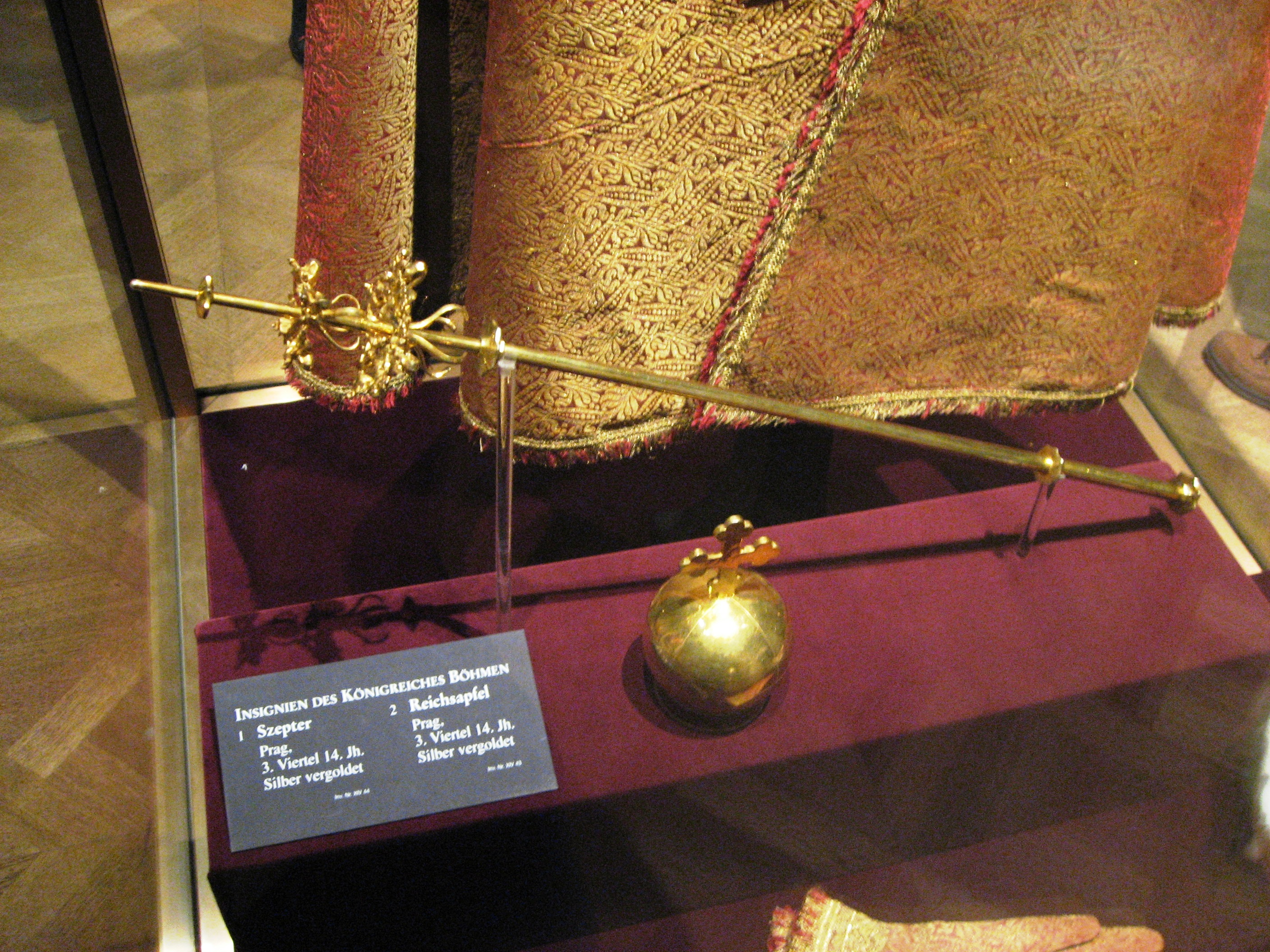
The original sceptre and orb from 14th century in Vienna

The crown is named and dedicated after the Duke St. Wenceslaus of the Přemyslids dynasty of Bohemia. The jewels should be permanently stored in the chapel of St. Wenceslaus in St. Vitus. They were only lent to Kings, and only on the day of the coronation, and should be returned in the evening that day. After 1918 and the establishment of the Czechoslovak Republic the Coronation Jewels ceased to serve their original function, but remained important as symbols of national independence and statehood.

In the past, the Jewels were kept in different places, but have been always brought to royal coronations in Prague. Wenceslaus IV (1378–1419) probably moved them to Karlštejn Castle. They were then repeatedly moved for safety reasons: in the 17th century, they were returned to Prague Castle, during the Thirty Years' War (1631) they were sent to a parish church in České Budějovice, and then they were secretly taken to the Imperial Treasury, Vienna (1637). While the Jewels were stored in Vienna, the original gold orb and sceptre from the 14th century were replaced with current ones. The new orb and sceptre probably originated with an order by Ferdinand I in 1533. Possible reasons for this replacement might be that the originals were simply too austere and lacked any precious stones. Deemed unrepresentative of the prestige of the Kingdom of Bohemia, it made sense to replace them with an orb and sceptre in an ornate, jeweled style that resembled the crown.

The Jewels were brought back to Prague on the occasion of the coronation of Bohemian king Leopold II in 1791. At that time, the current tradition of seven keys was established, though the holders of the keys in the course of time were changed according to political and administrative structures. The jewels were kept in Vienna due to the threat from the Prussian Army, but were later returned to Prague, arriving in the city on 28 August 1867.

According to the ancient tradition and regulations laid down by Charles IV in the 14th century, the Jewels are exhibited only to mark special occasions. Exhibitions can take place only at the Prague Castle. In the 20th century there were nine such moments in history. The President of the Republic has the exclusive right to decide on the display of the crown jewels.

An ancient Czech legend says that any usurper who places the crown on his head is doomed to die within a year. This legend is supported by a rumor that Reinhard Heydrich, the Nazi governor of the puppet state Protectorate of Bohemia and Moravia secretly wore them, and was assassinated less than a year later by the Czech resistance.

== Gallery ==
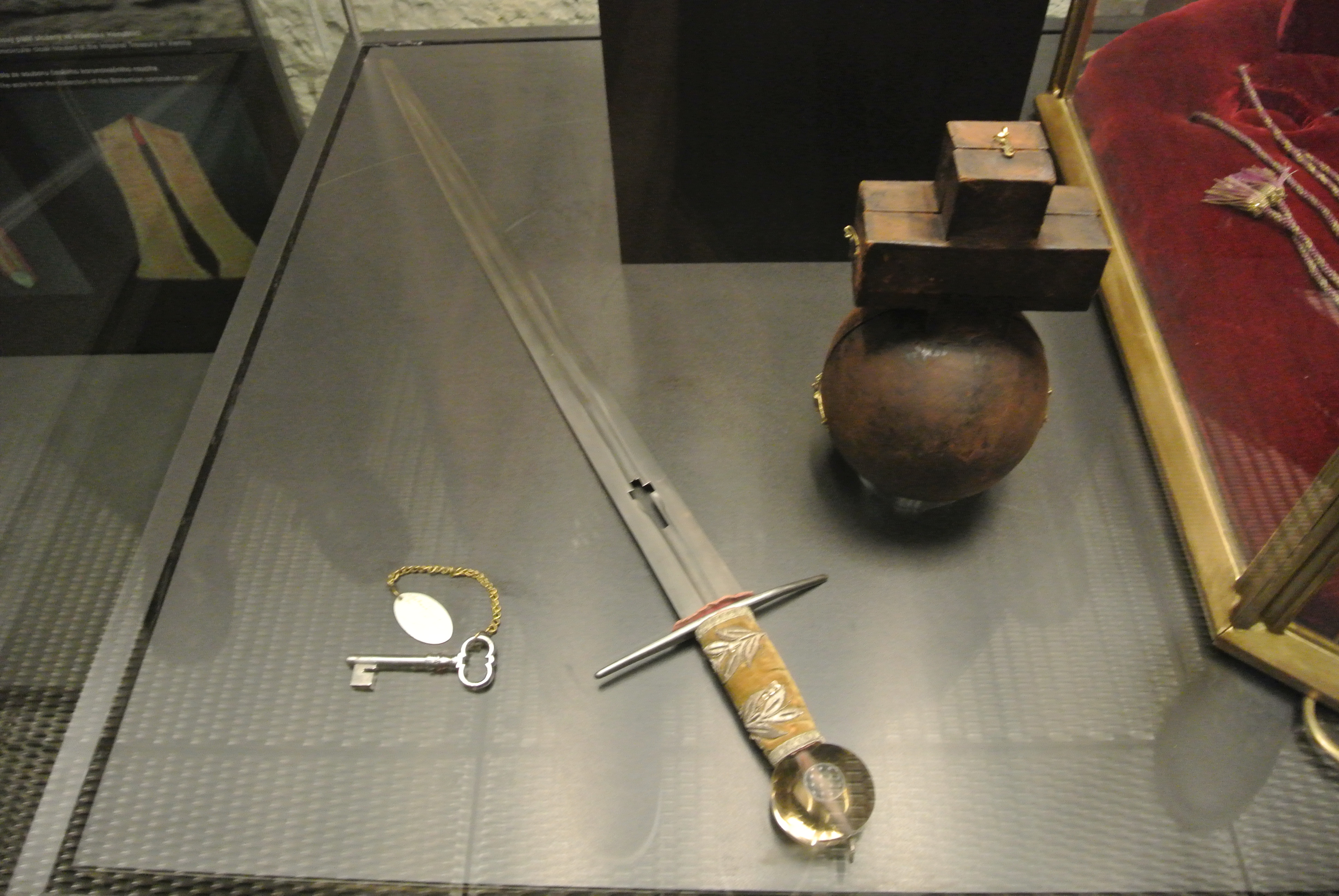
St. Wenceslas's Sword and one of the keys to jewel chamber

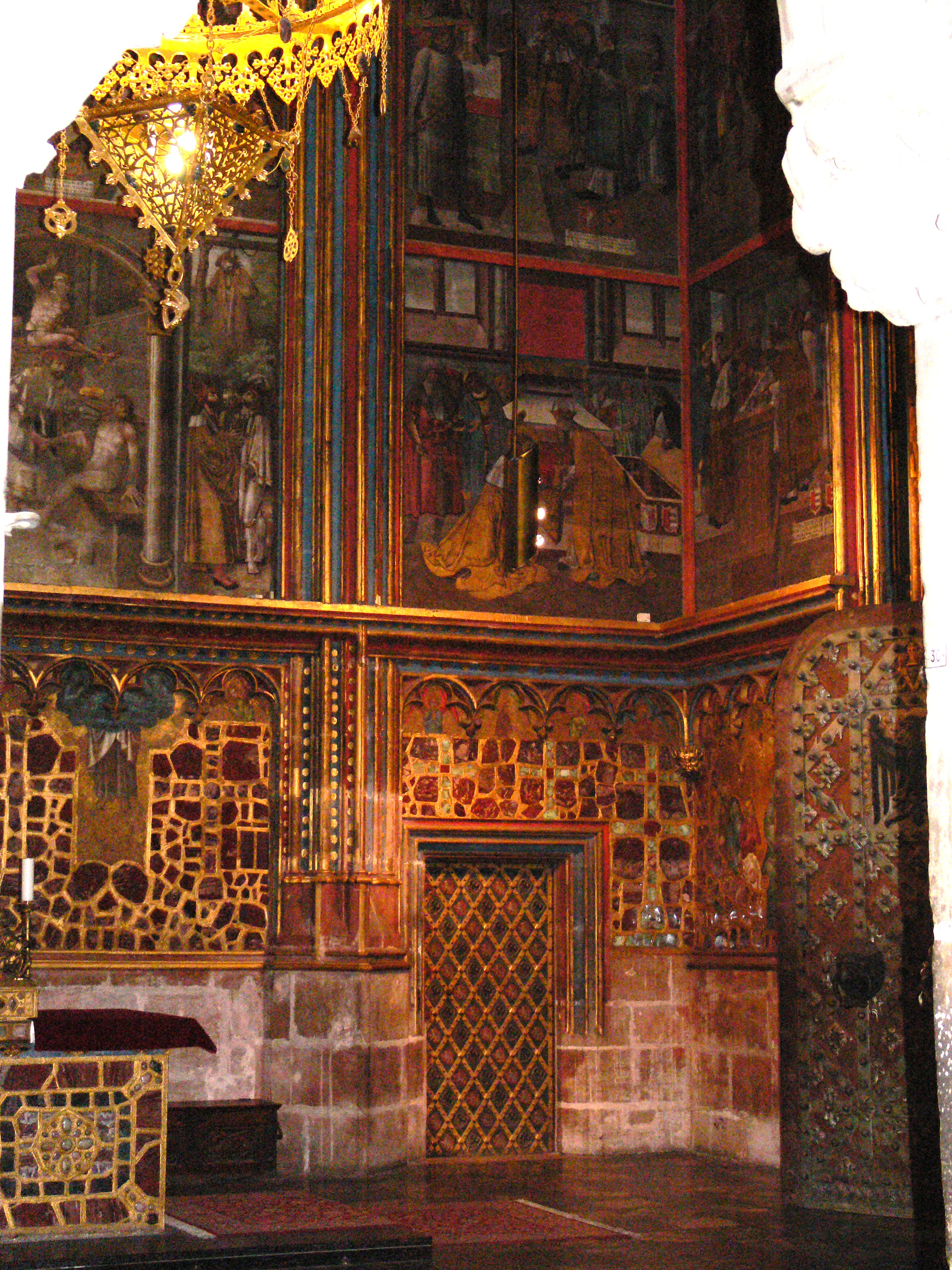
The door in the St. Vitus Cathedral

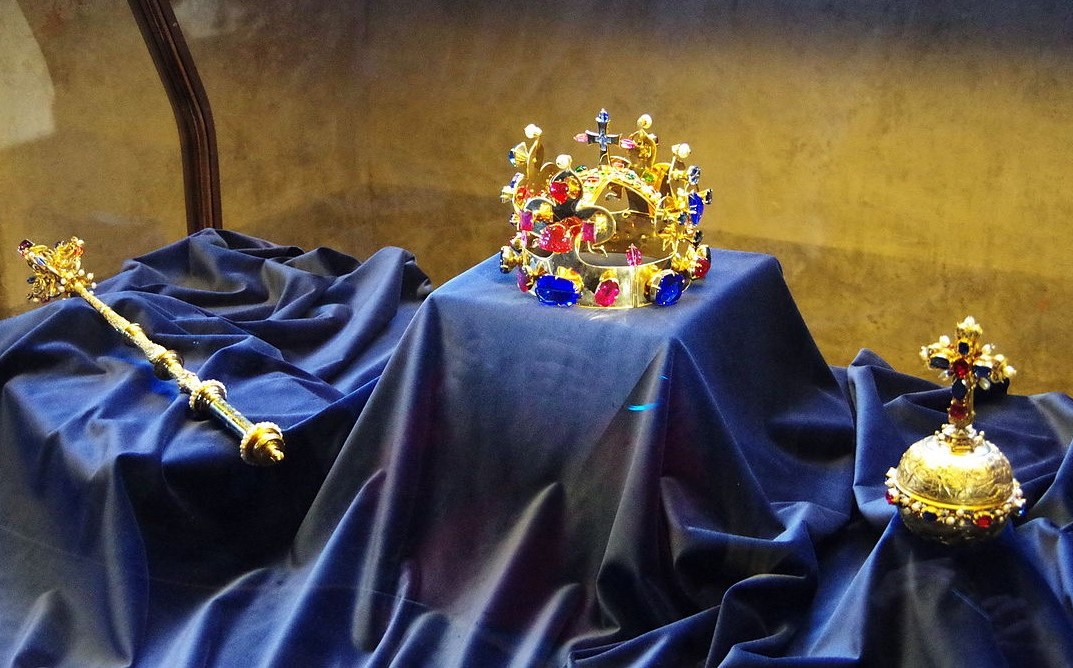
Reproductions of the Bohemian crown jewels

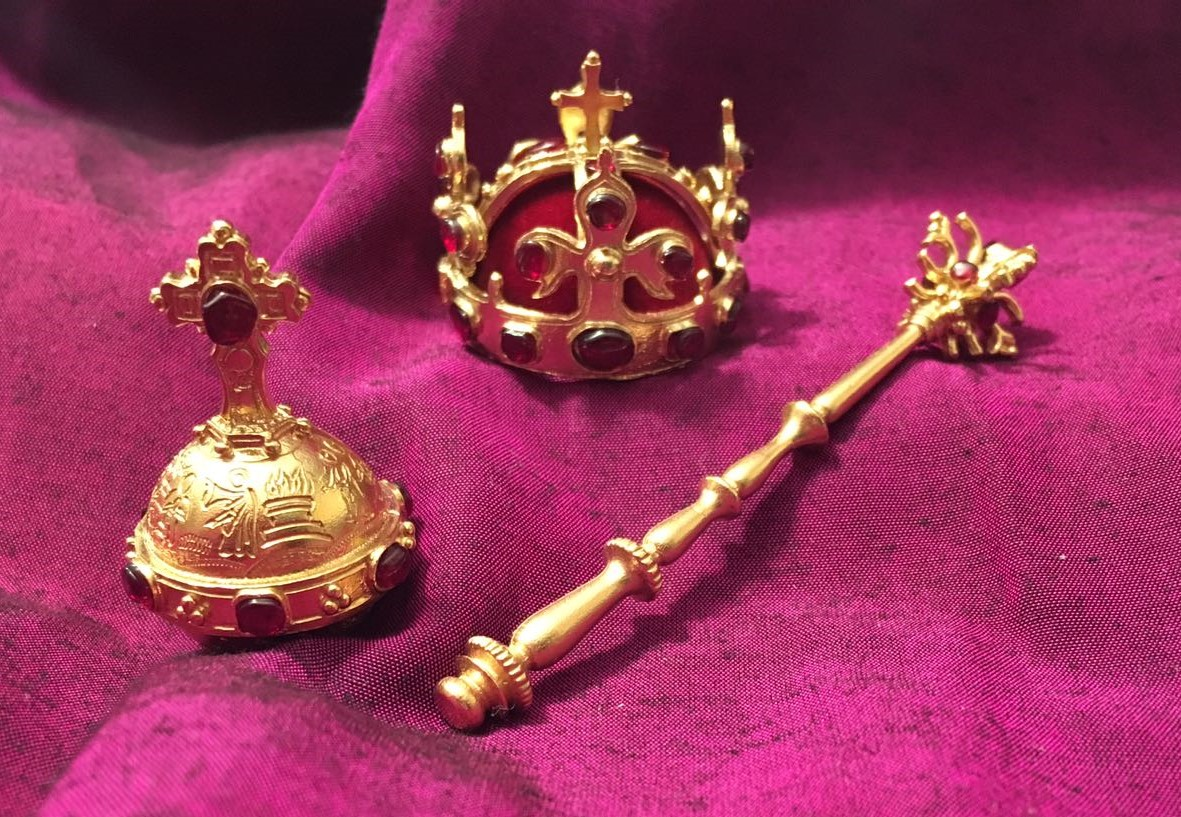
Little reproductions of the Bohemian crown jewels

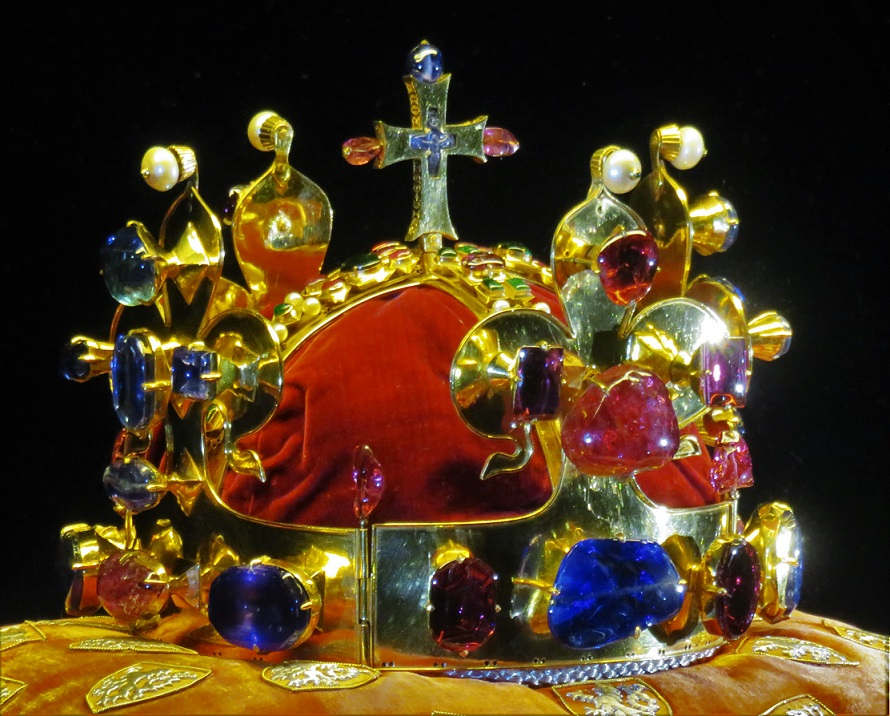
Crown of St. Wenceslas

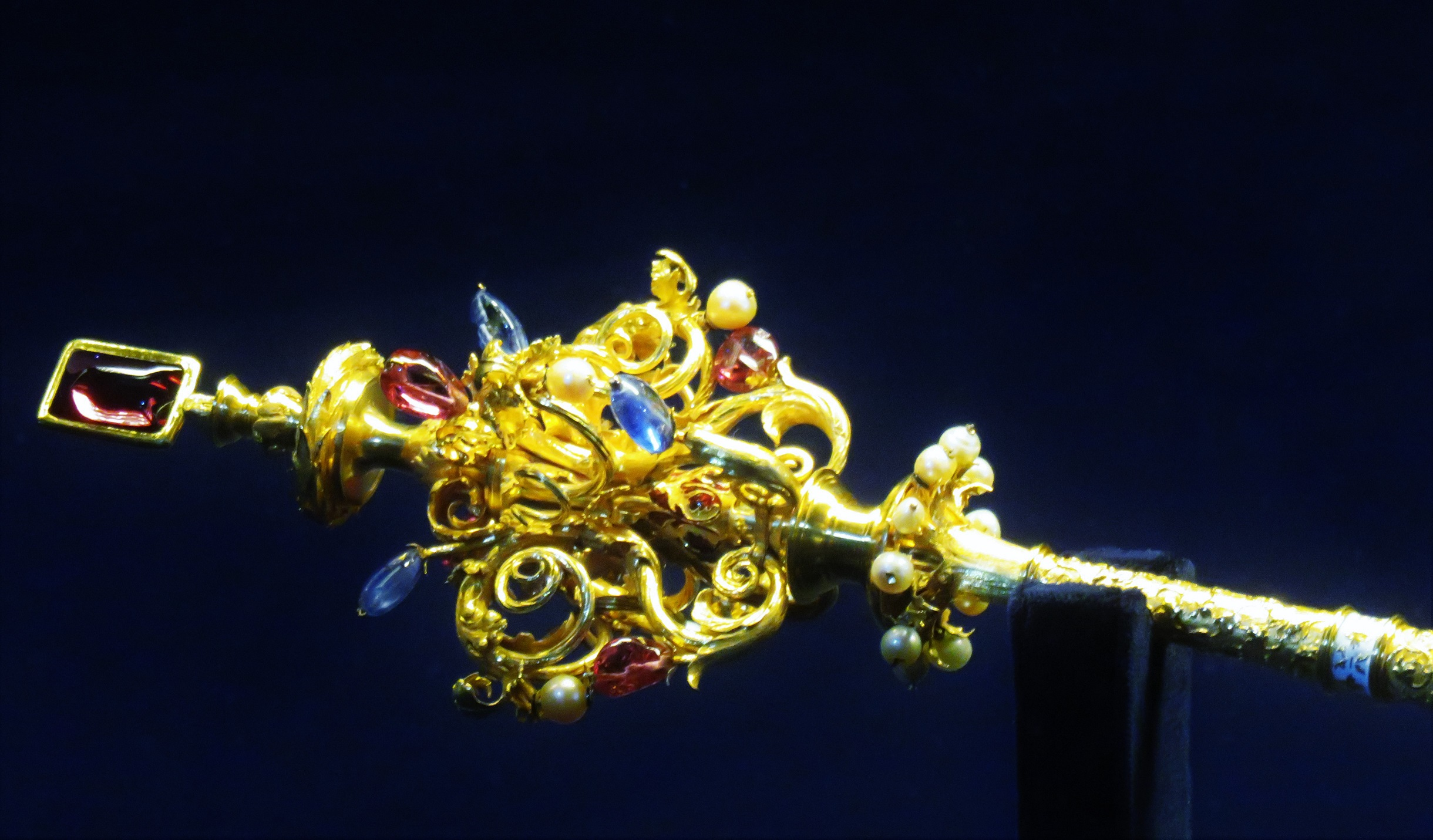
Royal sceptre of Bohemia

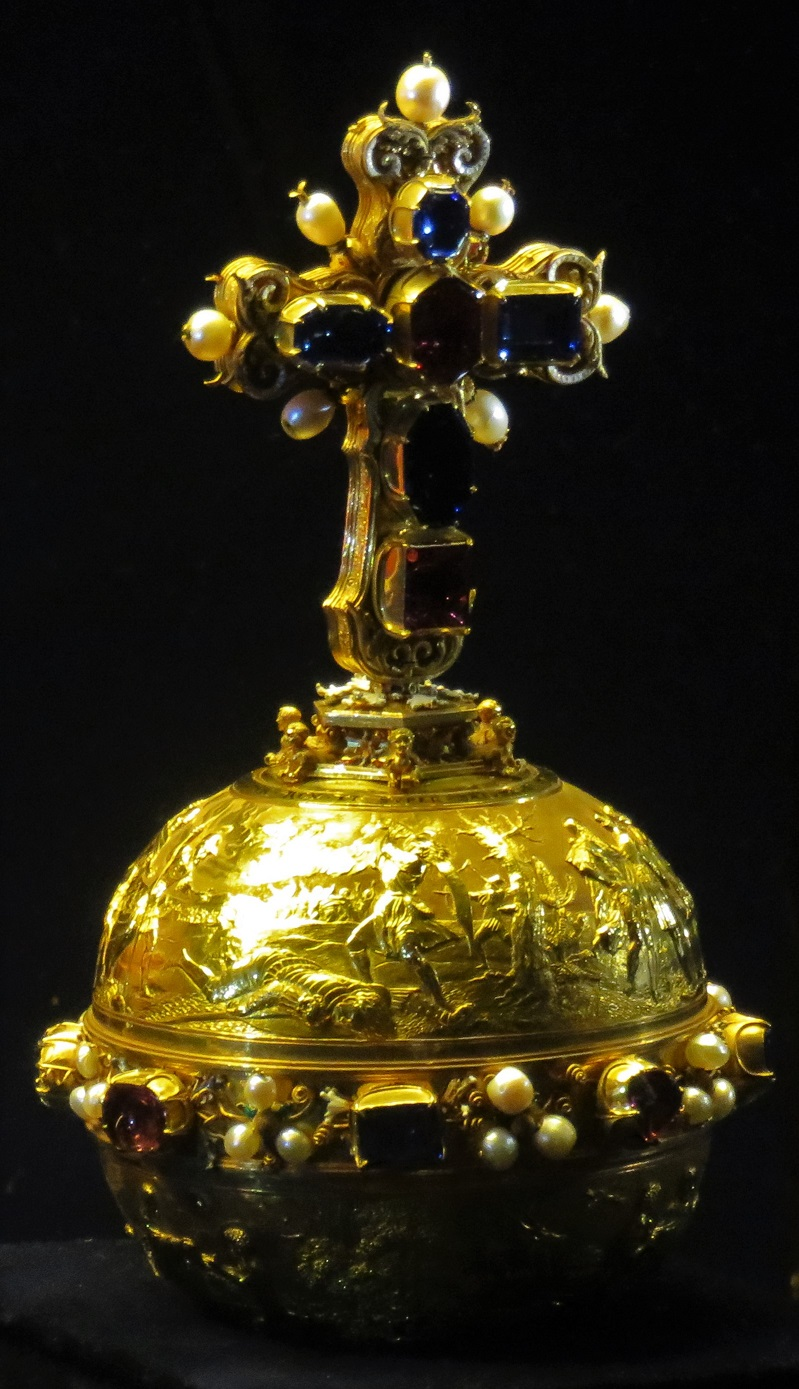
Royal orb of Bohemia

== Exhibitions ==
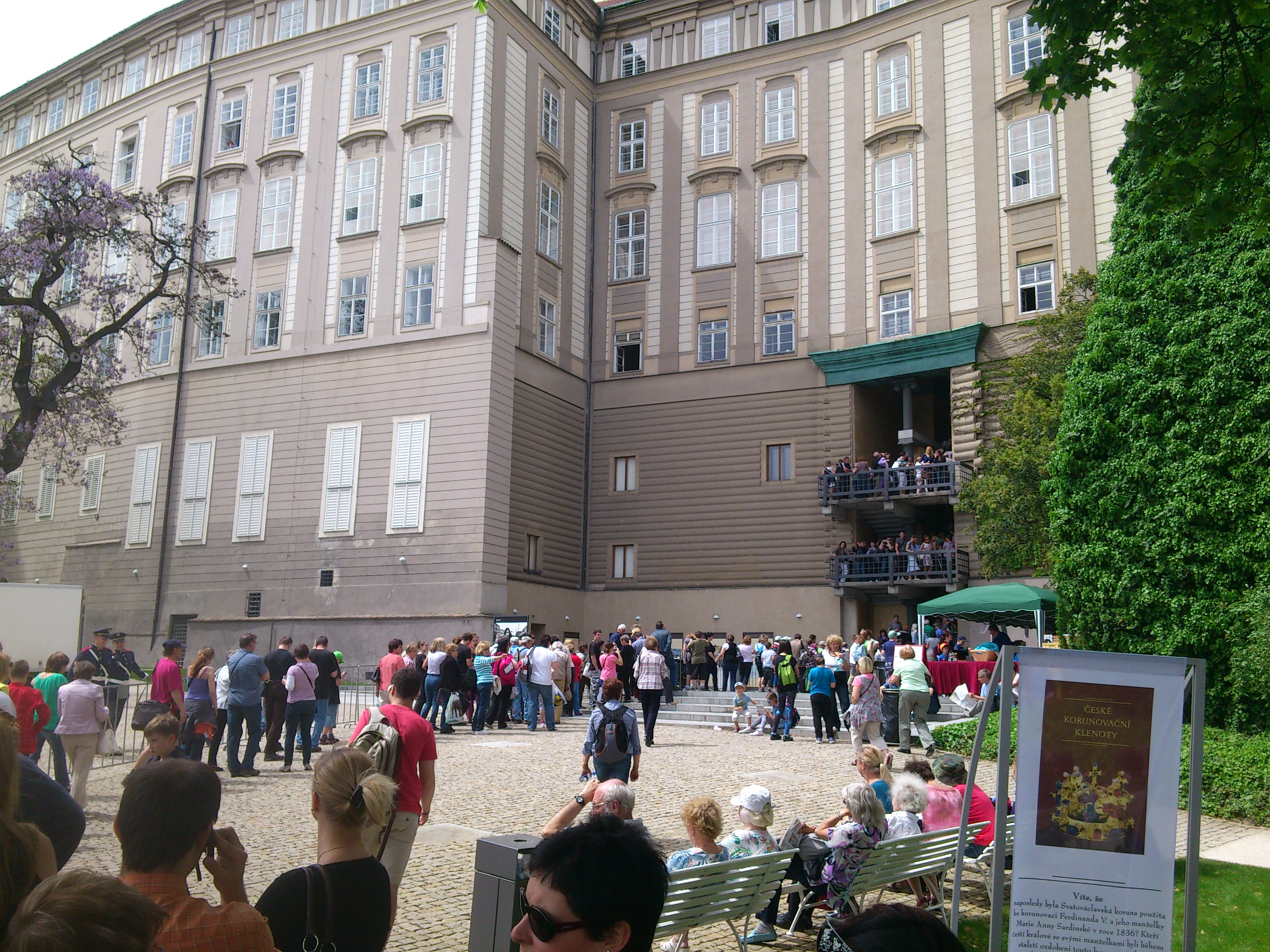
Crown jewels are exhibited only on special occasions. A queue for jewels at castle in 2013.

Date	Place	Occasion
22 September – 6 October 1929	St. Vitus Cathedral	1000 years since the death of St. Wenceslas
25–30 October 1945	St. Vitus Cathedral	Liberation of Czechoslovakia
1–6 July 1955	St. Vitus Cathedral	1st nationwide spartakiad
23 May – 30 August 1958	Old Royal Palace (Vladislav Hall)	1st national exhibition of archival documents
26 October – 3 November 1968	Plečnikova hall	50th anniversary of Czechoslovakia
2–25 May 1975	Basilica of St. George	30th anniversary of the liberation
26 June – 4 December 1978	Old Royal Palace (Charles Hall)	600 years since the death of Charles IV; Exhibition Time of Charles IV in the history of Czech nation
29 January – 7 February 1993	Old Royal Palace (Charles Hall)	Formation of the Czech Republic
24 October – 1 November 1998	Old Royal Palace (Charles Hall)	80th anniversary of Czechoslovakia; Election of president Václav Havel
3–13 August 2003	Old Royal Palace (Charles Hall)	85th anniversary of Czechoslovakia; 10th anniversary of the Czech Republic; Election of president Václav Klaus
19–29 April 2008	Old Royal Palace (Vladislav Hall)	90th anniversary of Czechoslovakia; Election of president Václav Klaus
10–19 May 2013	Old Royal Palace (Vladislav Hall)	Direct election of president Miloš Zeman
15–29 May 2016	Old Royal Palace (Vladislav Hall)	700th anniversary of Charles IV's birth

== List of crowned Bohemian kings and queens ==
If not mentioned coronation was held in Prague.

King	Coronation date
Vratislaus II. (1061–1092, king from 1085): Świętosława of Poland	20 April 1085, Mainz; 15 June 1086 15 June 1086
Vladislaus II. (1140–1172, king from 1158): Judith of Thuringia (?)	11 January 1158, Regensburg; 8 September 1158, Milan 1158 (?)
Ottokar I. (1192–1193, 1197–1230, king from 1198)	8 September 1198, Boppard; 24 August 1203, Merseburg
Wenceslaus I. (1230–1253): Kunigunde of Hohenstaufen	6 February 1228 6 February 1228
Ottokar II. (1253–1278): Kunigunda of Slavonia	25 December 1261 25 December 1261
Wenceslaus II. (1283–1305): Judith of Habsburg; Elisabeth Richeza	2 June 1297 2 June 1297; 26 May 1303
John the Blind (1310–1346): Elizabeth of Bohemia; Beatrice of Bourbon	7 February 1311 7 February 1311; 18 May 1337

Kings and queens crowned with the Crown of Saint Wenceslas (and other crown jewels):

King	Coronation date
Charles IV. (1346–1378): Blanche of Valois; Anne of the Palatinate; Anna of Schweidnitz; Elizabeth of Pomerania	2 September 1347 2 September 1347; 1 September 1349; 28 July 1353; 18 June 1363
Wenceslaus IV. (1378–1419): Joanna of Bavaria; Sophia of Bavaria	15 June 1363 17 November 1370; 13 March 1400
Sigismund (1419–1421, 1436–1437): Barbara of Cilli	28 July 1420 11 February 1437
Albert (1438–1439)	29 June 1438
Ladislaus the Posthumous (1453–1457)	28 October 1453
George of Poděbrady (1458–1471)	2 April 1458
Vladislaus II. (1471–1516)	22 August 1471
Louis II. (1516–1526): Mary of Hungary	11 March 1509 1 June 1522
Ferdinand I. (1526–1564): Anne of Bohemia and Hungary	24 February 1527 24 February 1527
Maximilian II. (1564–1576): Maria of Austria	20 November 1562 20 November 1562
Rudolf II. (1576–1611)	25 September 1575
Matthias II. (1576–1619): Anna of Tyrol	11 May 1611 10 January 1616
Frederick (1619–1620): Elizabeth of Bohemia	4 November 1619 4 November 1619
Ferdinand II. (1619–1637): Eleonora Gonzaga	29 June 1617 21 November 1627
Ferdinand III. (1637–1657): Eleonora Gonzaga	24 November 1627 11 November 1656
Ferdinand IV.	5 August 1646
Leopold I. (1657–1705)	14 November 1656
Charles VI. (1711–1740): Elisabeth Christine of Brunswick-Wolfenbüttel	5 September 1723 8 September 1723
Maria Theresa (1740–1780)	12 May 1743
Leopold II. (1790–1792): Maria Luisa of Spain	6 September 1791 12 September 1791
Francis I. (1792–1835): Maria Theresa of Naples and Sicily	9 August 1792 11 August 1792
Ferdinand V. (1835–1848): Maria Anna of Savoy	12 September 1836 12 September 1836

== See also ==
- Crown jewels
