= Treasury of St. Vitus Cathedral =

Church treasury in Prague, Czechia

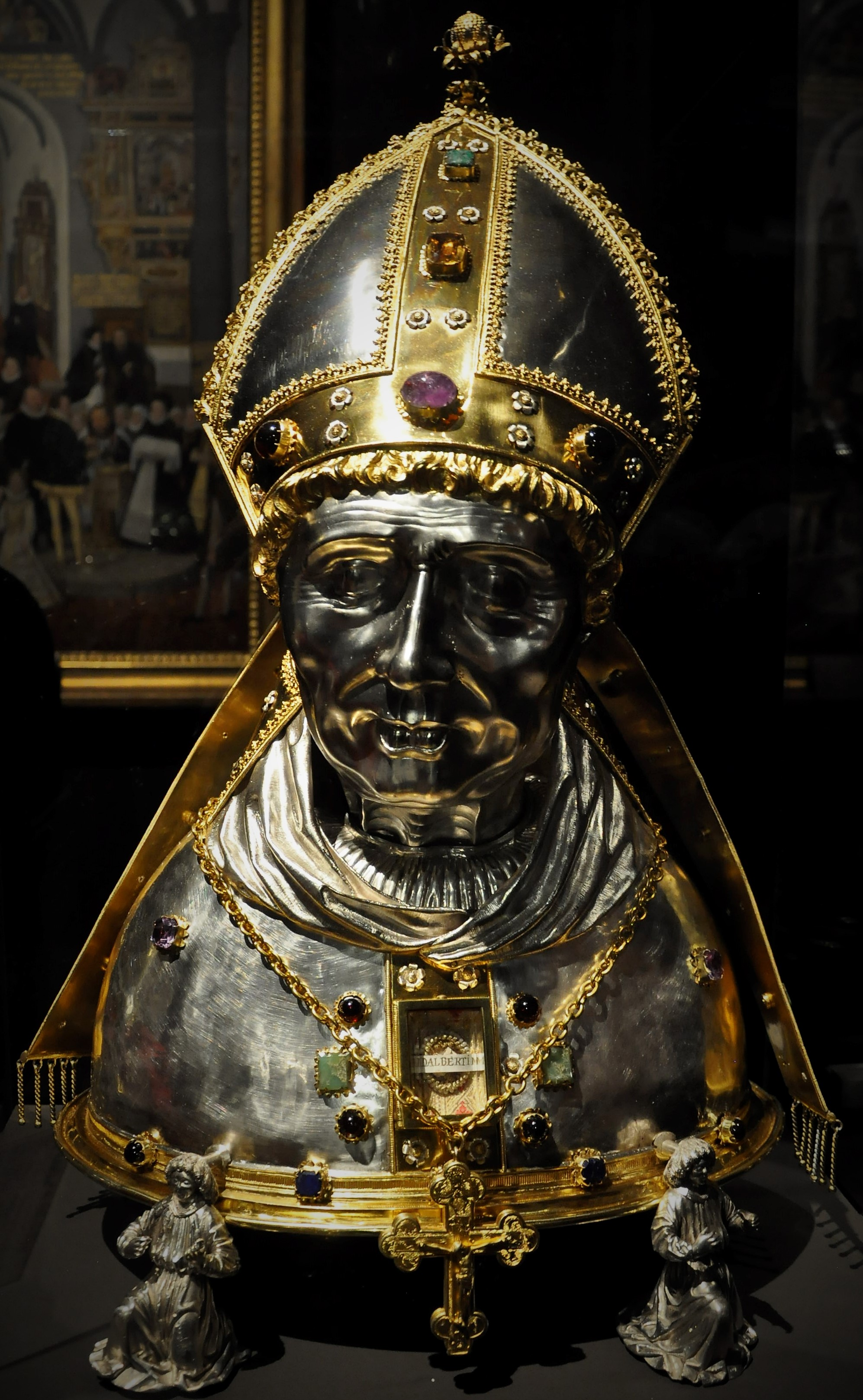
Reliquary bust of St. Adalbert of Prague, c. 1500

The Treasury of St. Vitus Cathedral (Czech: Svatovítský poklad) is a collection of ecclesiastical treasures of the Prague Cathedral and is in the property of Prague Cathedral Chapter. It is the largest church treasury in the Czech Republic and one of the most extensive in Europe. The Treasure contains more than 400 items, 139 from them have been displayed since 2012 in a new exhibition in the Chapel of the Holy Rood in Prague Castle.

The Treasury includes many holy relics and reliquaries. Famous are the Sword of Saint Wenceslas or Coronation Cross of Bohemia. One of the oldest items in the Treasury is a relic of the arm of Saint Vitus, acquired by Czech Duke Wenceslas (Saint) in 929 from German king Henry the Fowler. Duke Wenceslas built a new church to preserve this relic in honor of Saint Vitus – today St. Vitus Cathedral. The Cathedral and its treasury was richly donated by many rulers, e. g. by Emperor Charles IV or King Vladislaus II.

== The Artifacts ==
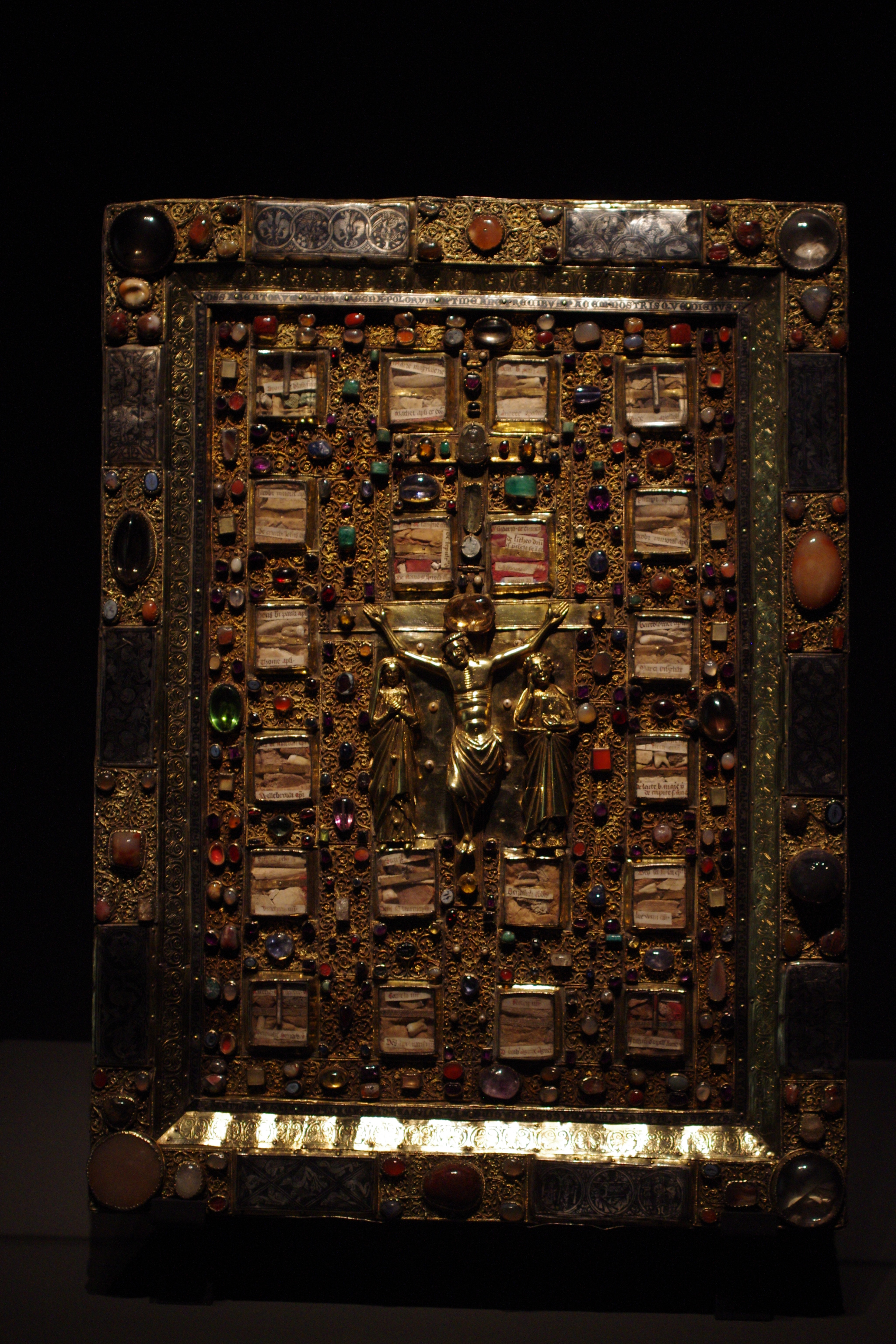
Nostic Plentary / Trier table

- Sword of Saint Wenceslas
- Helmet of St. Wenceslas
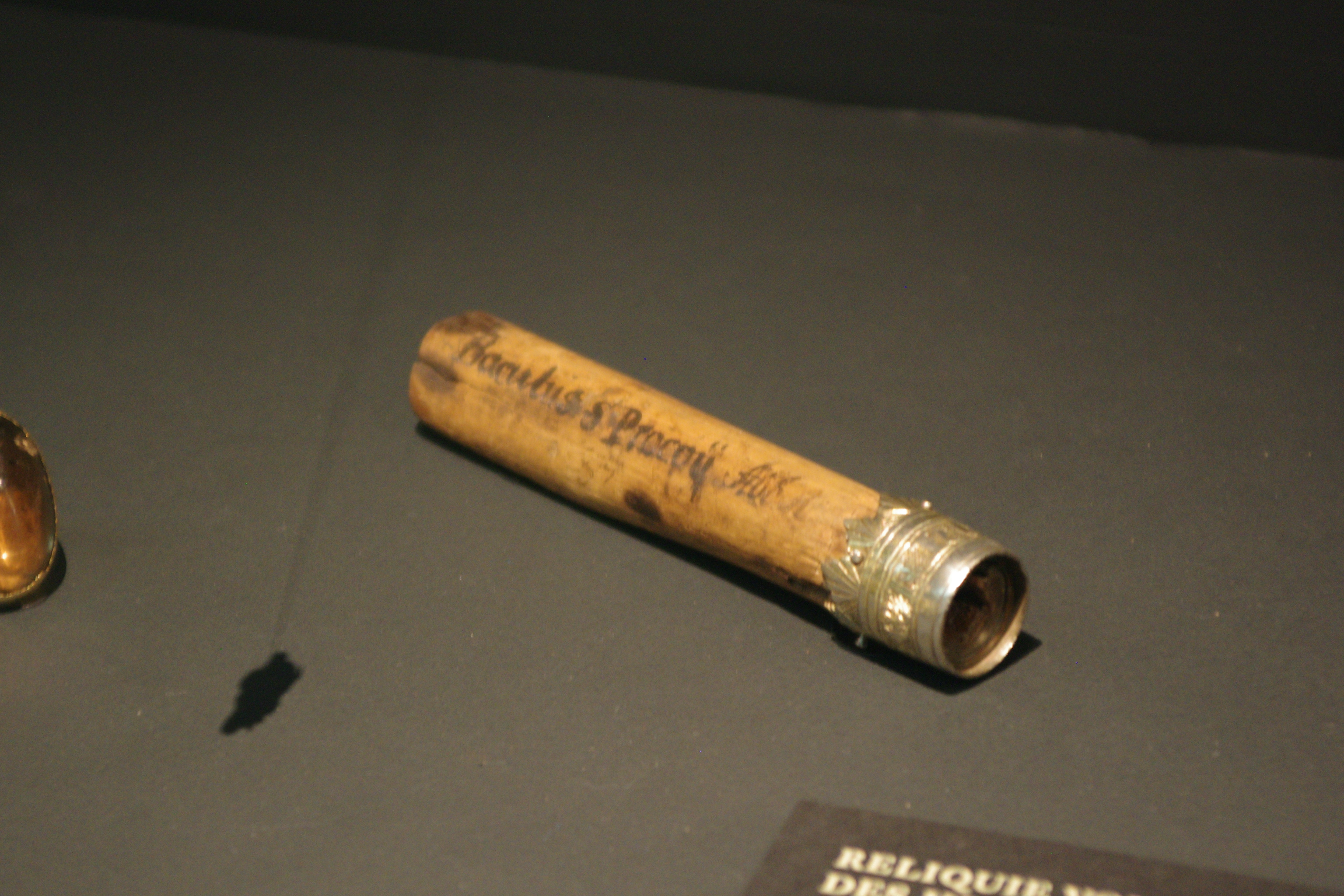
  Staff of St. Procopius
- The so-called Comb of St. Adalbert (carving in ivory)
- Two rings of St. Adalbert
- Skull of St. Wenceslas (used for the cult, not on display)
- Skull of Saint Ludmila (used for the cult)
- Reliquary with a fragment of the staff of Moses
- Nostic Plenary, or Trier Tablet
- Reliquary with the finger of Saint Nicholas
- Silver reliquary bust of Saint Ludmila
- Czech Coronation Jewels (Saint Wenceslas Crown, Renaissance Scepter and Renaissance Apple)
- The golden so-called Coronation Cross of Charles IV. with precious stones, gems, and relics of many saints
- Crystal altar cross in gold mounting
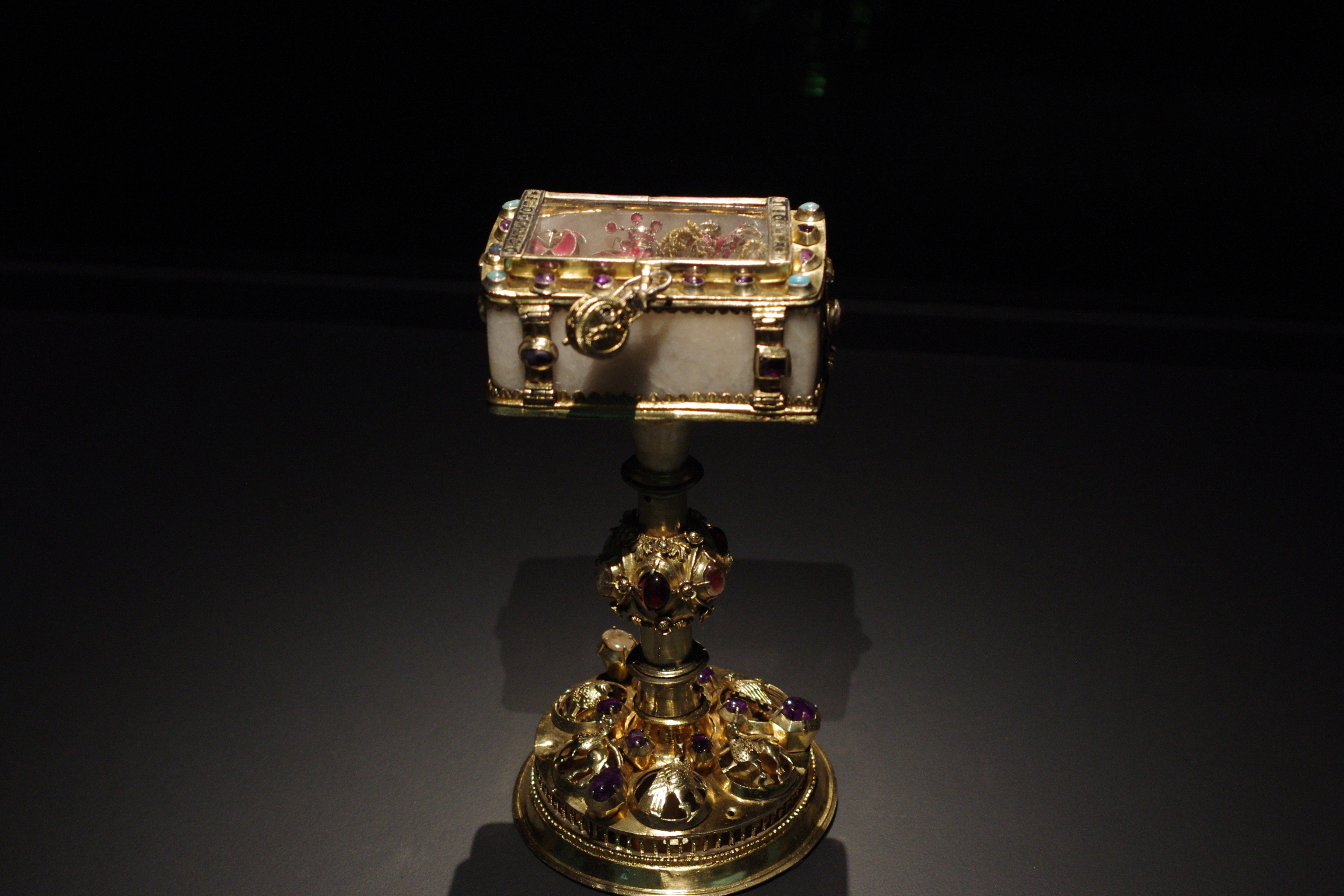
  St. Nicolas Finger reliquary
- The Last Supper Tablecloth Crystal Teapot (displayed empty)
- Crystal bowl with veil of the Virgin Mary in gold mounting
- Tower reliquary of St. Catherine
- Tower reliquary with Parler's mark in label
- The reliquary arm of St. George
- Onyx chalice in gold = mounting, with the coat of arms of Emperor Charles IV.
- Veraikon of St. Vitus
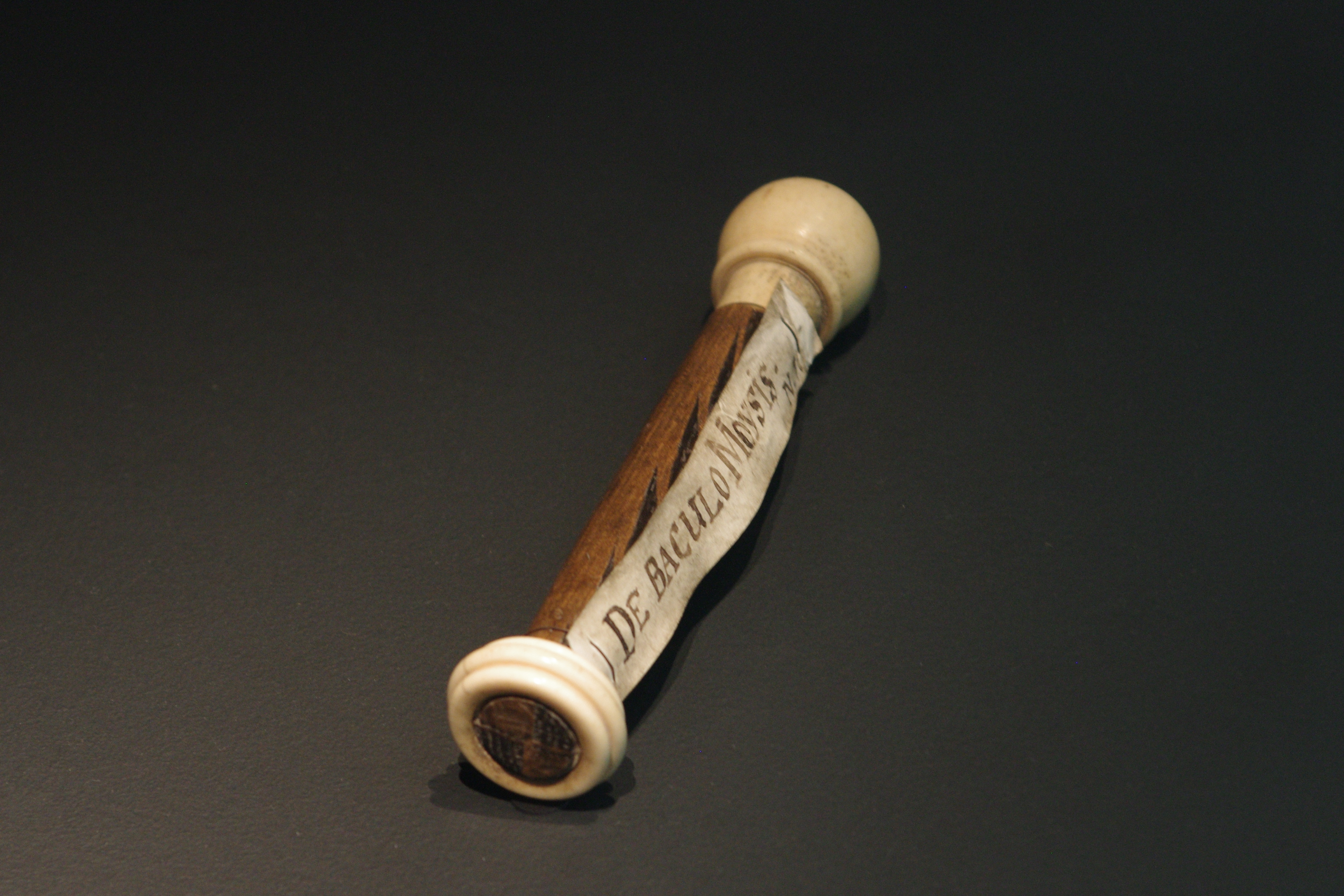
  So called "Staff of Moses"
- The so-called The veraikon in a gold frame is a copy of the Byzantine mandylion
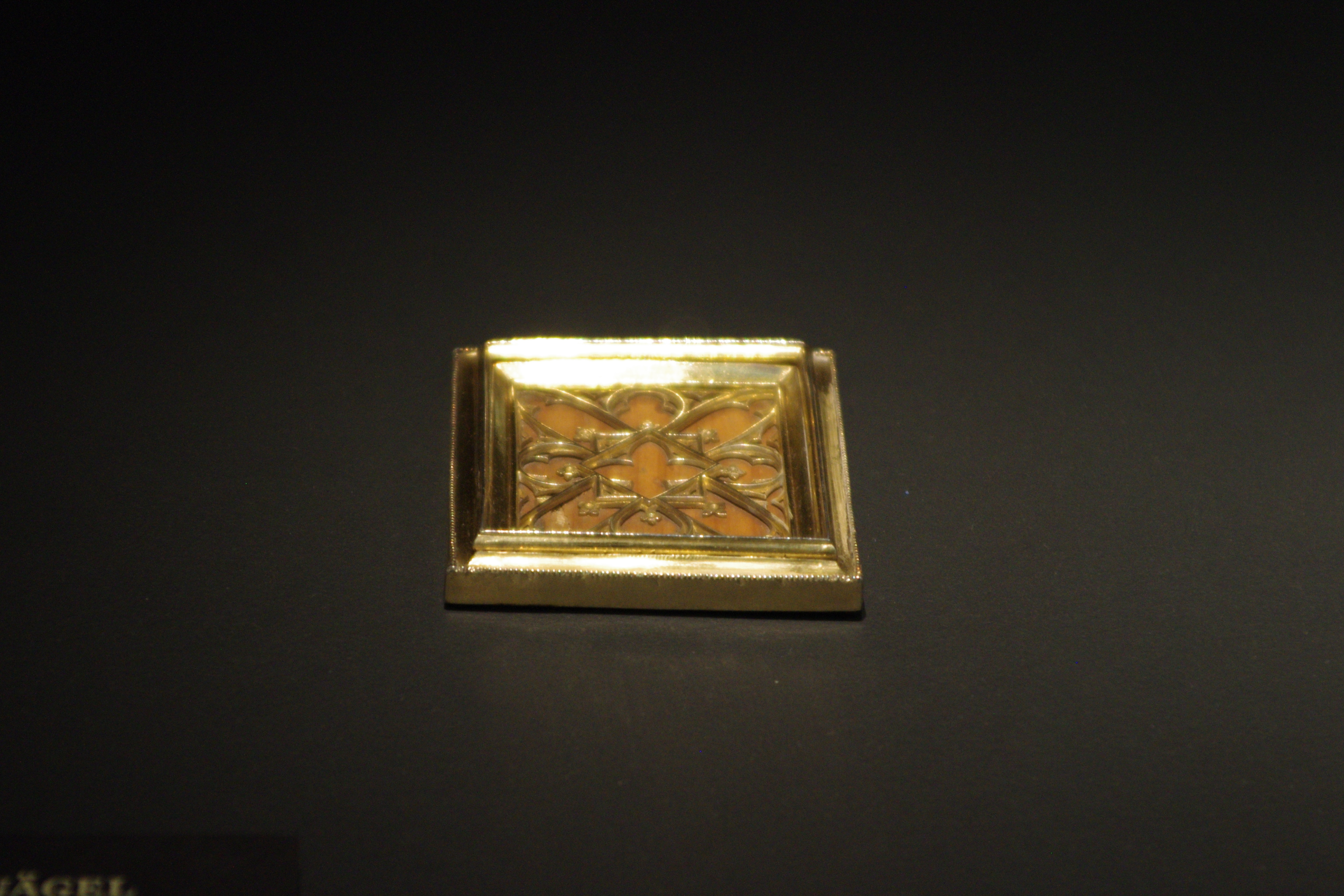
  Piece of table from the Last Supper
- Panel painting of Madonna Aracoeli
- Ivory casket for the remains of Saint Sigismund
- St. Wenceslas cape with stole
- Miter of Saint Adalbert
- Skull of Saint Luke the Evangelist (not on display)
- Arm with reliquary of Saint Barbara in palm
- Arms of Saint Ludmila in a Gothic reliquary
- Kolovrat Plenary from 1465
- Bust of Saint Adalbert
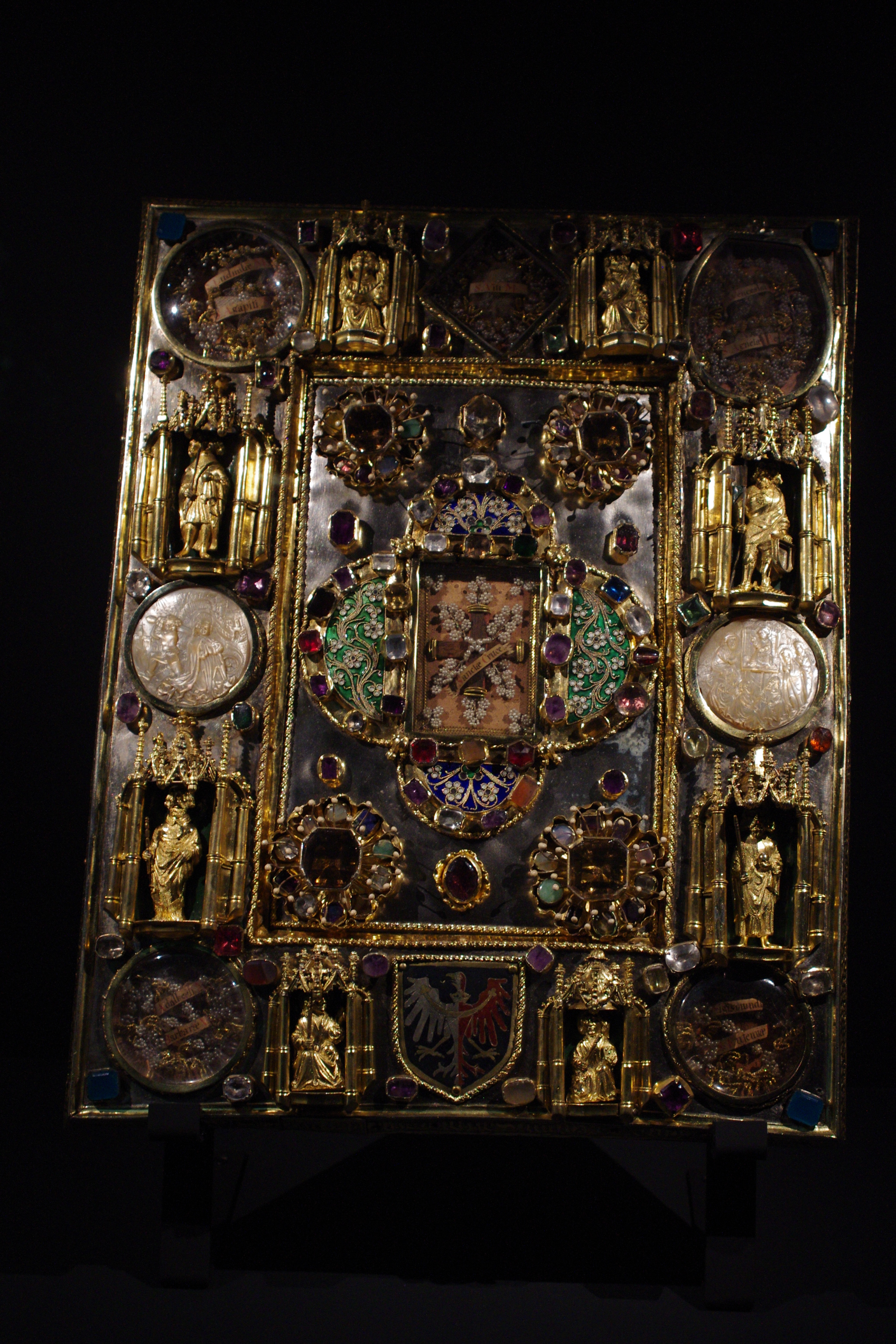
- Kolowraty plentary
  Bust of St. Wenceslas
- Bust of Saint Vitus
- Bust of Saint Anne the Third
- Arms of Saint Wenceslas in a late Gothic reliquary
- Renaissance monstrance of gems, jaspers and crystal,
- A set of gold Rudolphine jewelry
- Reliquary chest from the tomb of St. Wenceslas
- Reliquary for the tongue of St. John of Nepomuk (not on display)
- Mitra preciosa of Cardinal Arnošt Harrach
- Solar monstrance of Jan Ignác Dlouhoveský
- Sun monstrance diamond
- Silver Christening set of kettle and sink of Prague Archbishop Jan Josef Breuner
- Ferdinand Khünburg's archbishop's scepter with an enamelled Saint Vitus in a medallion
- Capitular gold monstrance
- Reliquary with crossed branches of St. Stephen
- A set of silver shields with relief scenes from the legend of St. John of Nepomuk
- A golden set of chalices with a tray and with the Lobkovic clan emblems
- Monstrance of the French King Charles X.
- Harrach monstrance made of crystal glass
- Gold Rose of Empress Maria Anna Habsburg
- and many more...

== Gallery ==
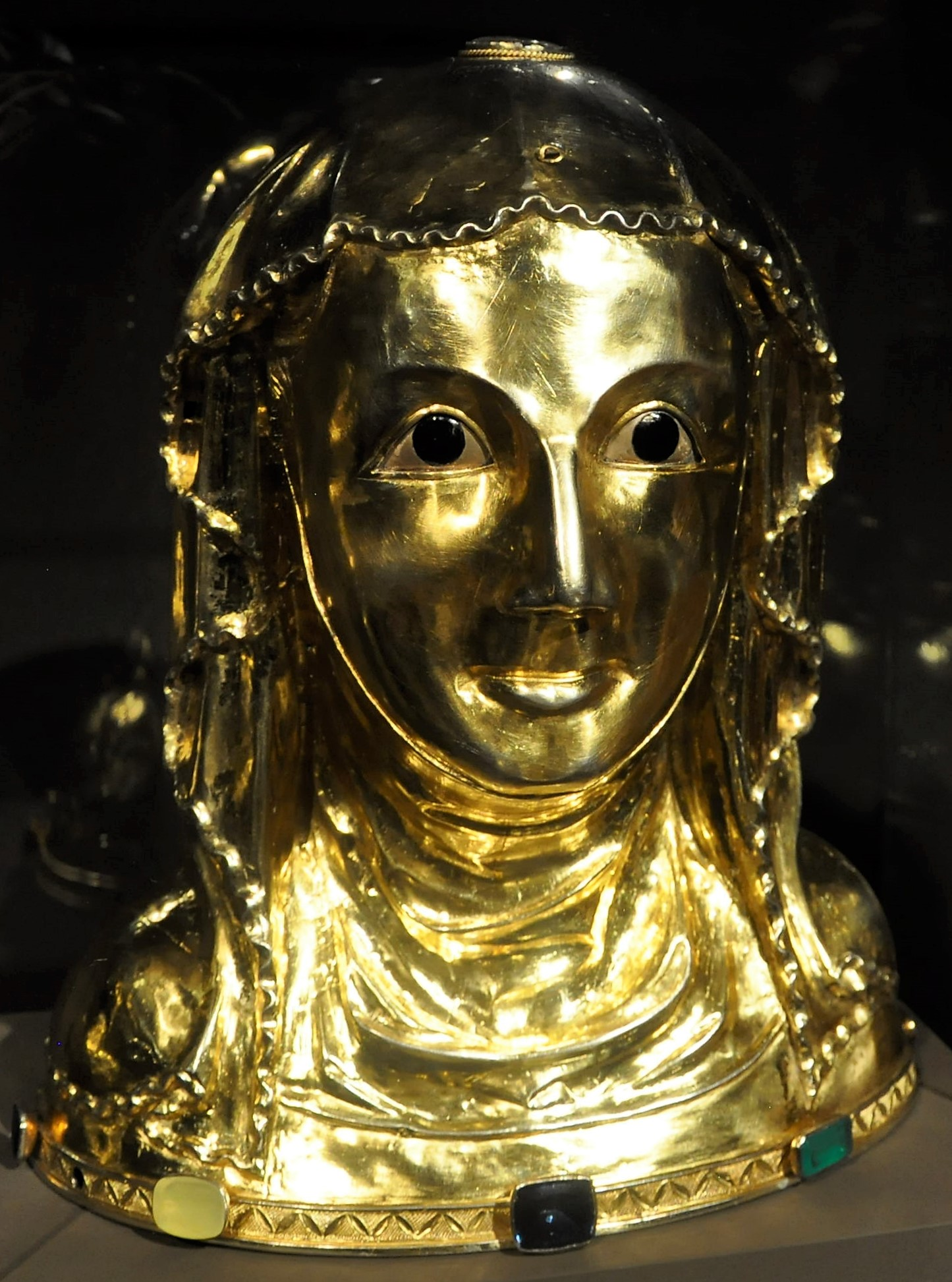
Bust Reliquary of St. Ludmila, 14th century

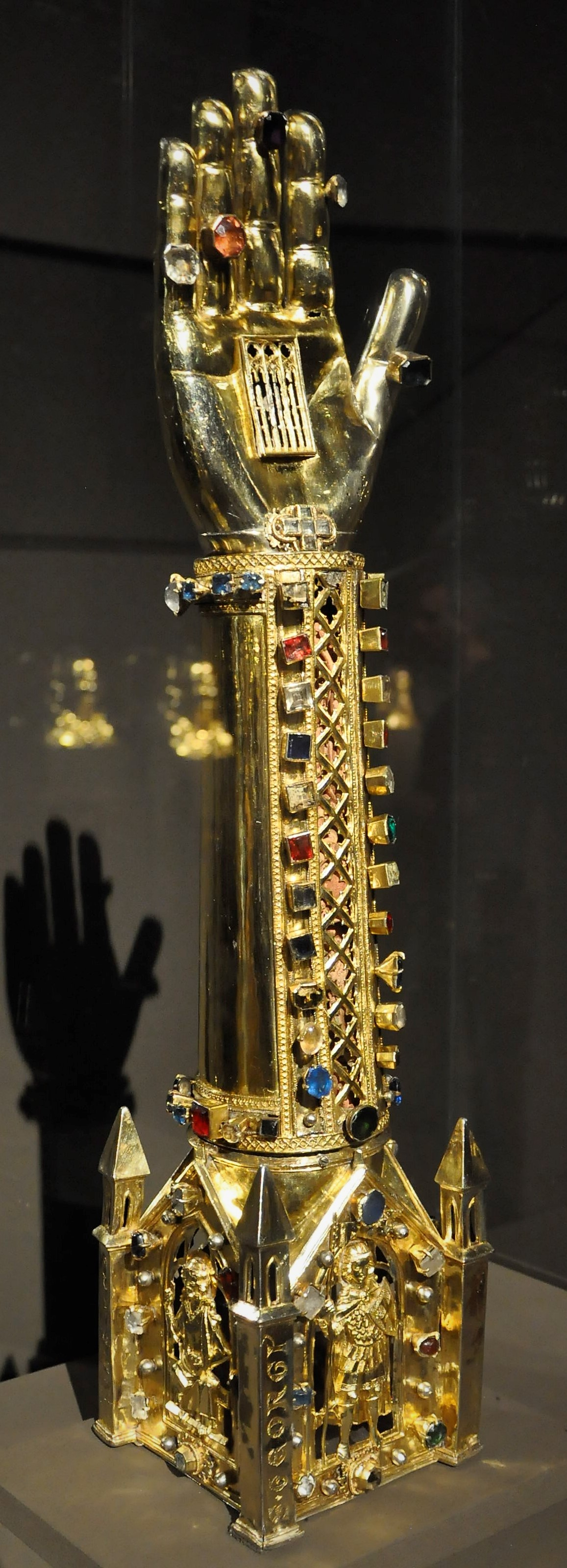
Arm Reliquary of St. George, late 13th century

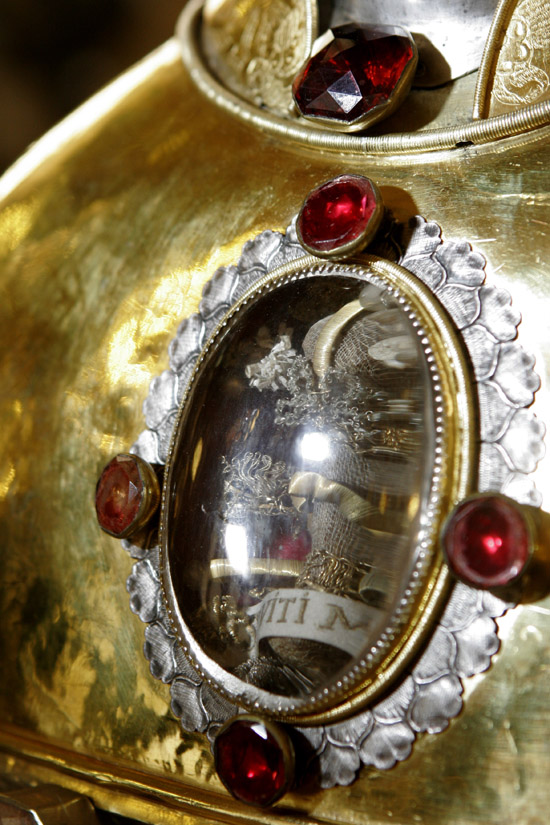
Detail of St. Vitus Reliquary, late 15th century

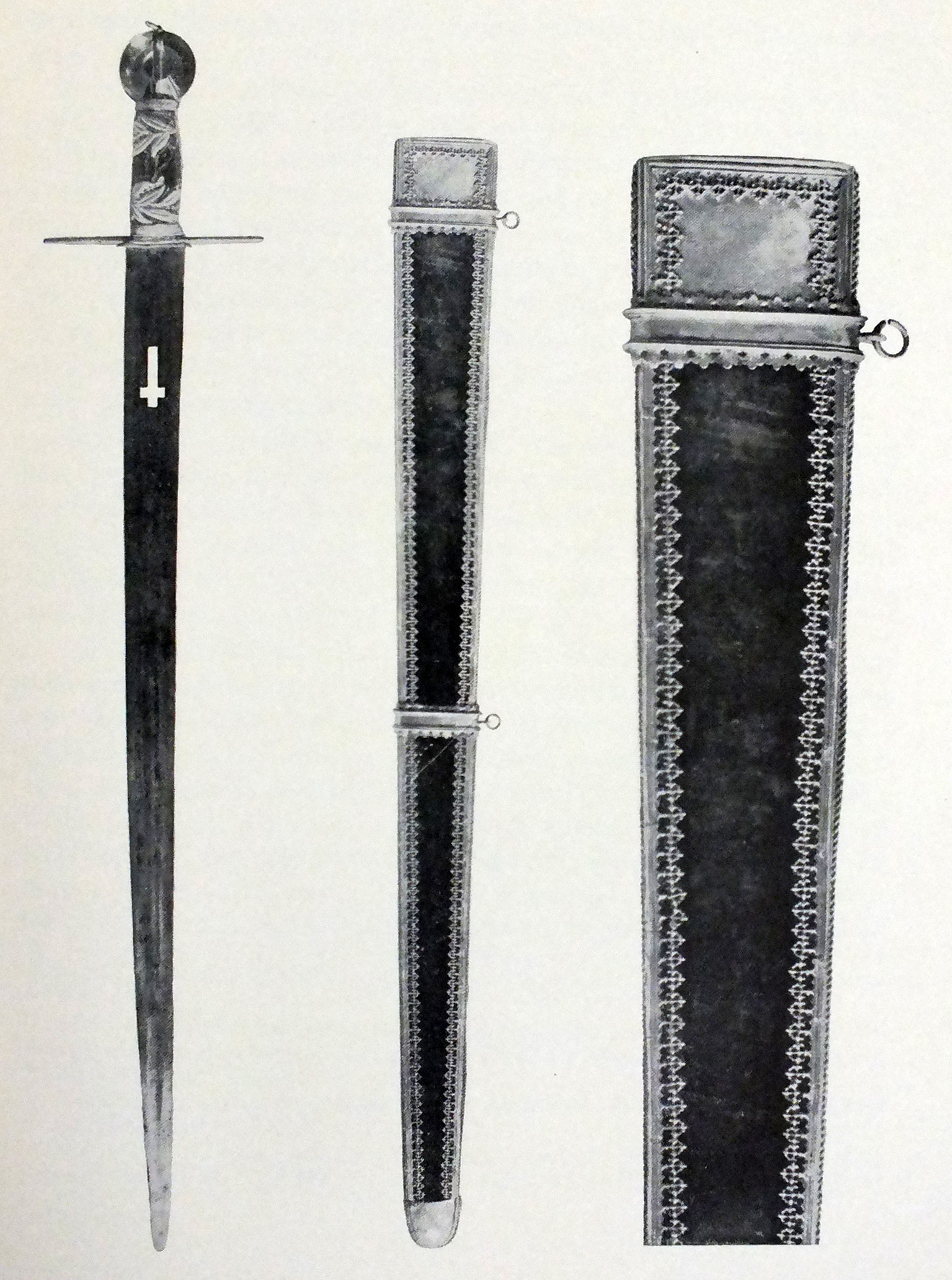
Sword of Saint Wenceslas, 10th century

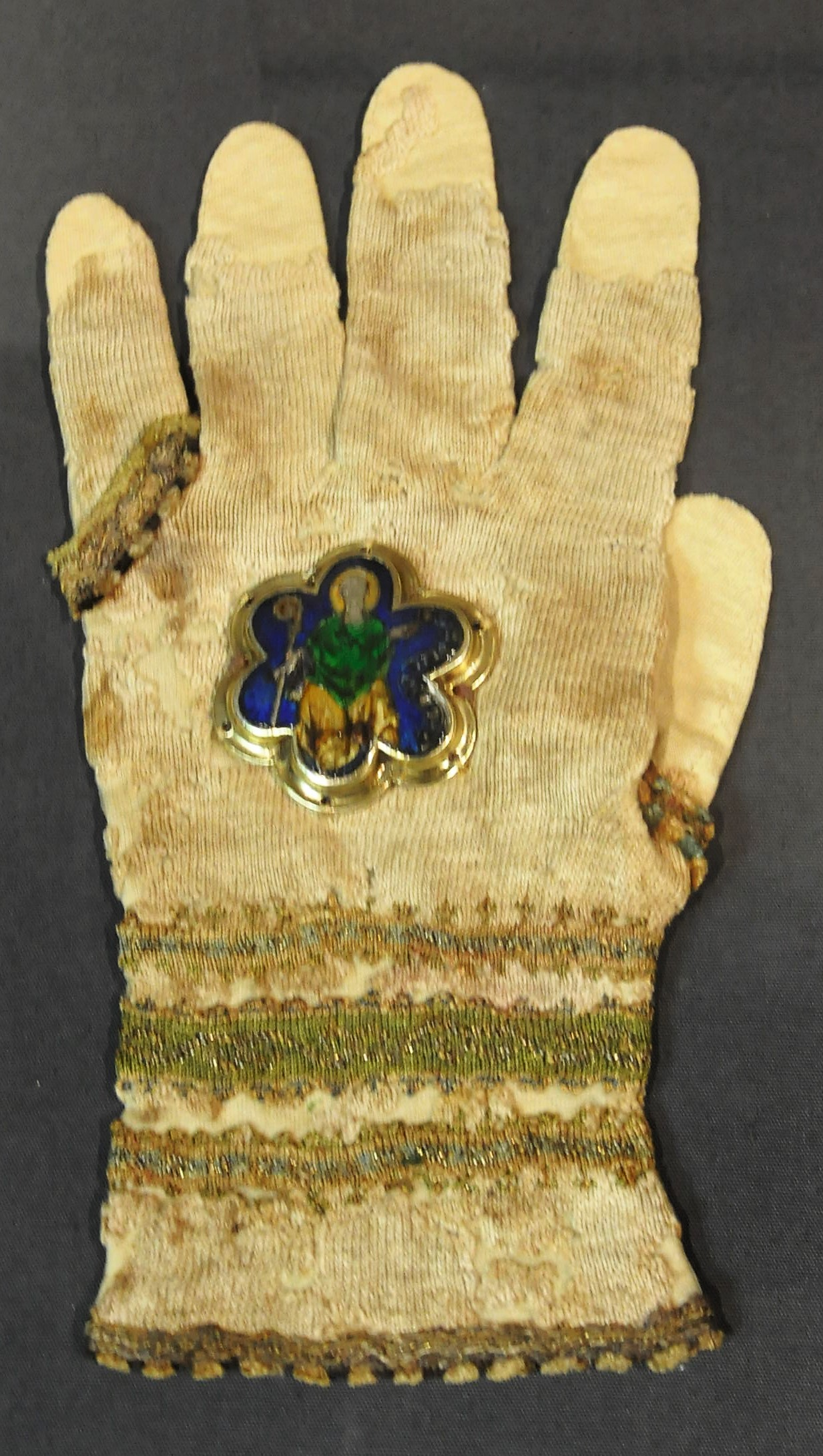
Glove of St. Adalbert, 12th–14th century

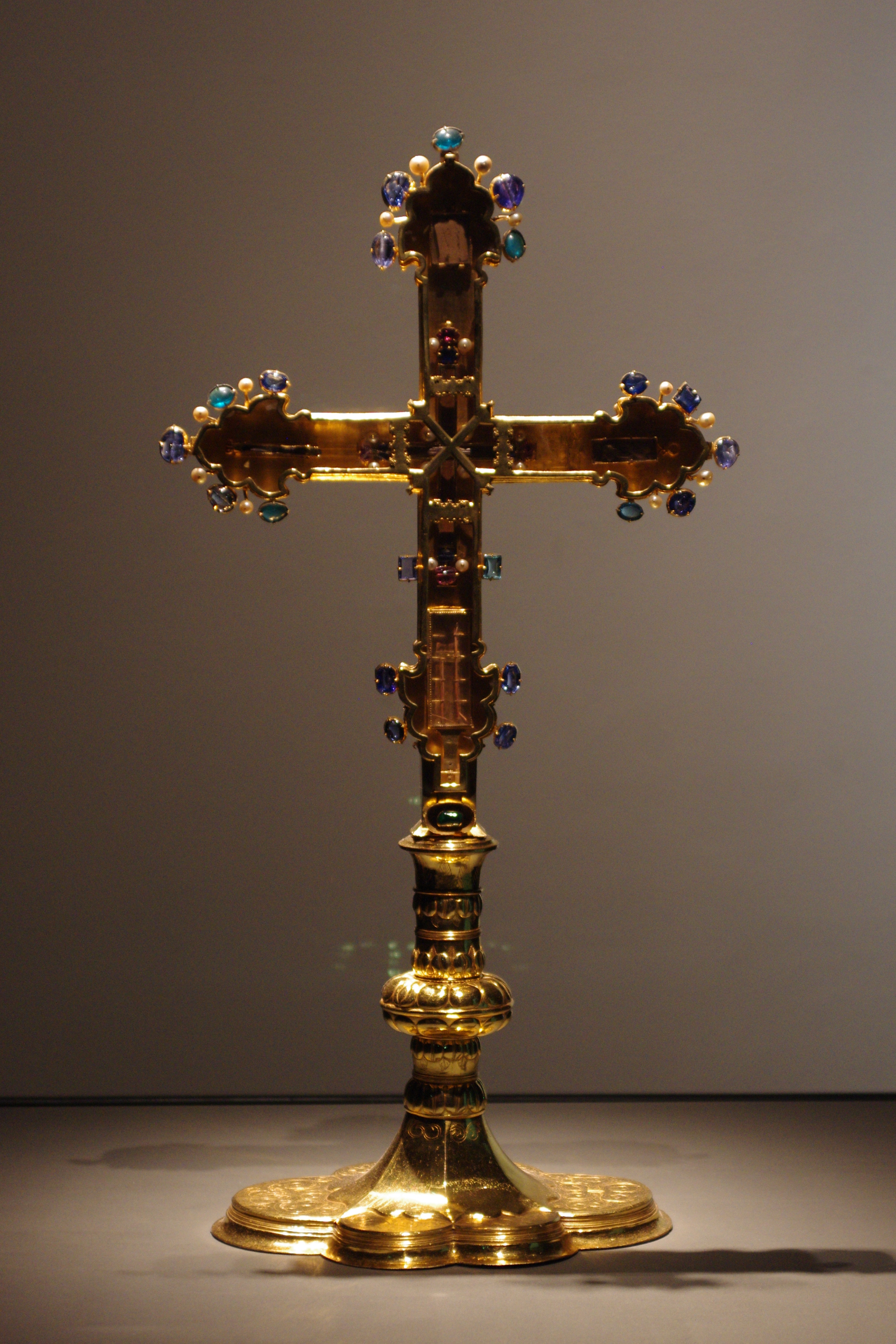
Coronation Cross of Bohemia, 14th Century

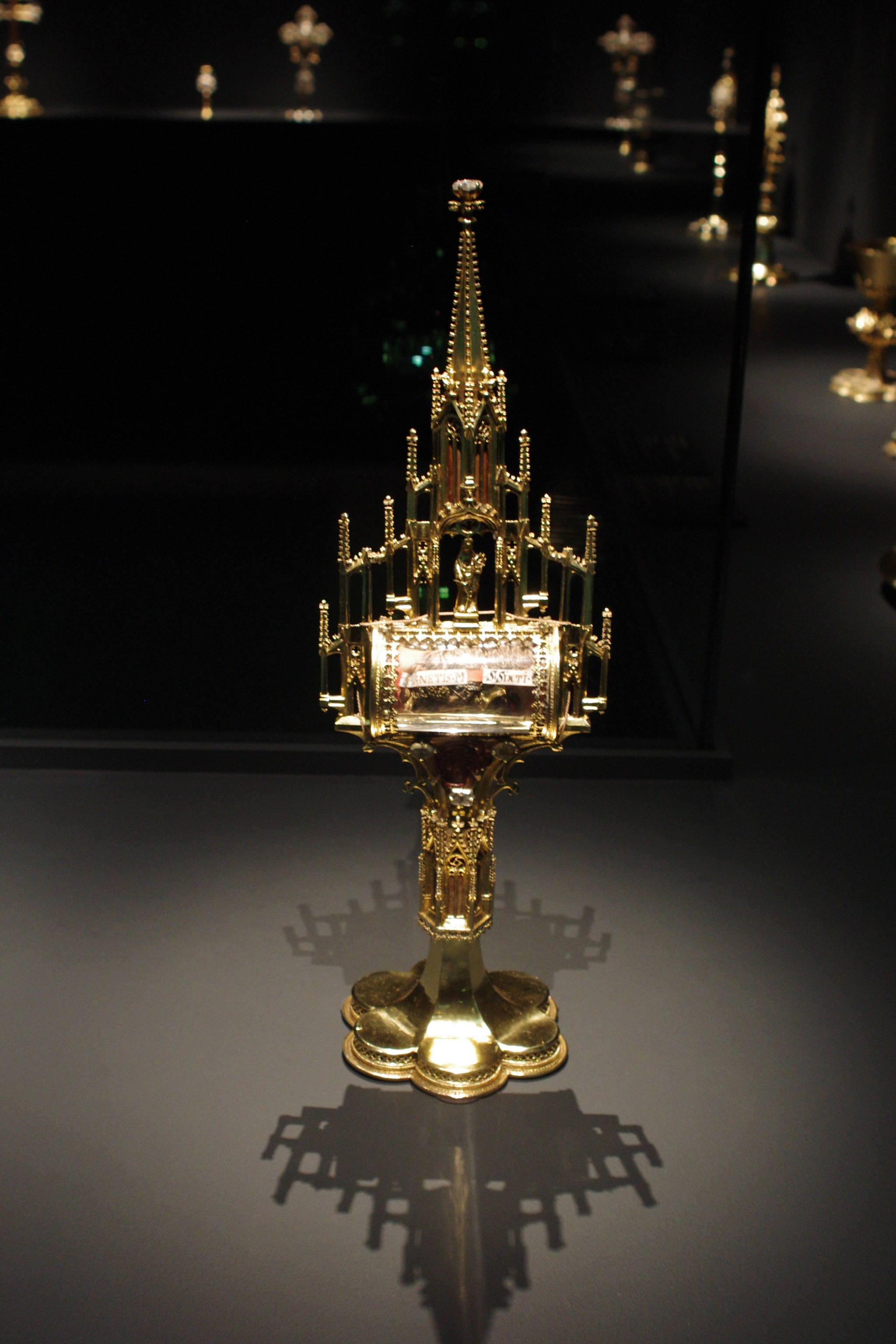
St. Catherine Reliquary, 14th Century

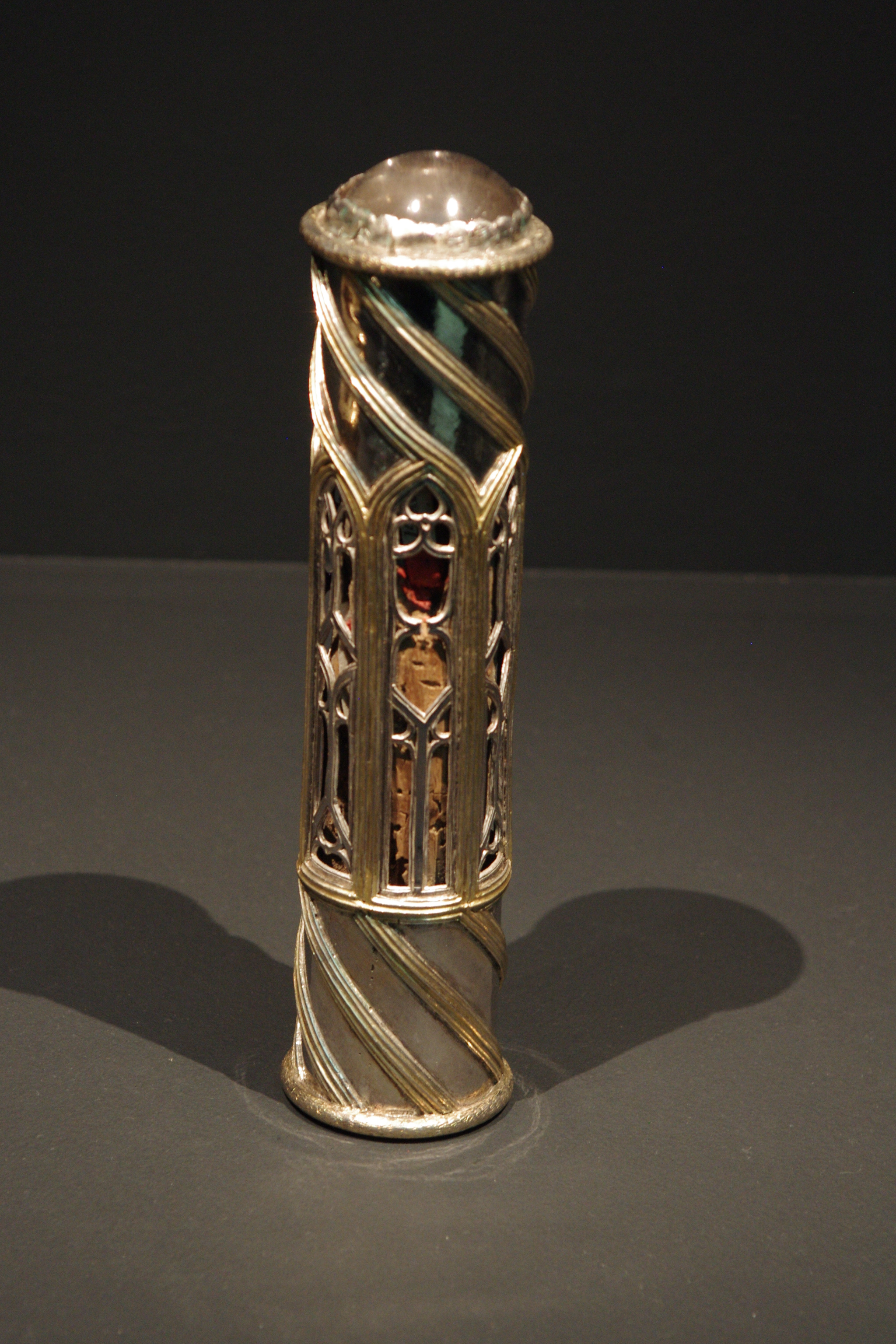
Staff of St. Peter, 14th Century

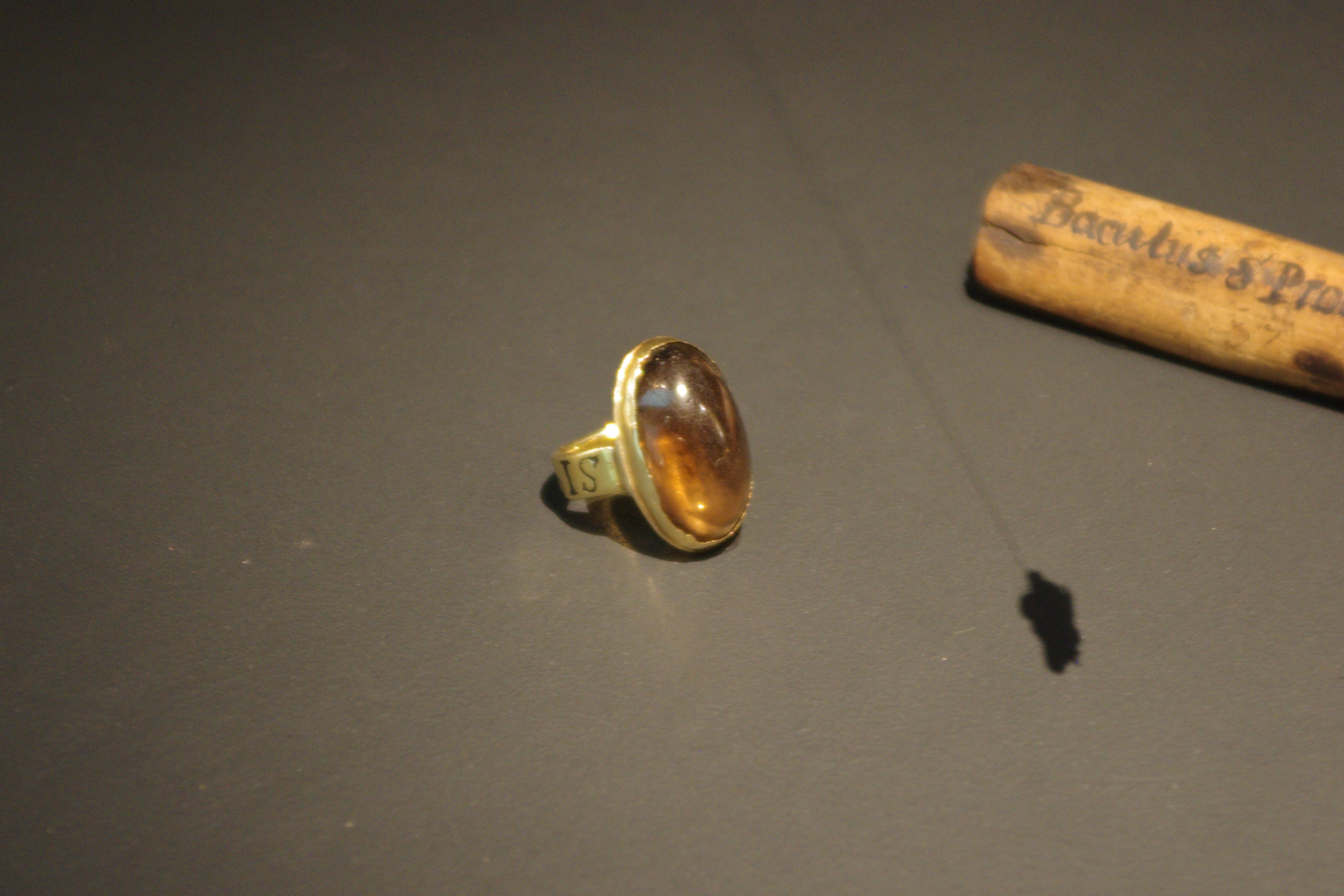
Ring of St. Adalbert

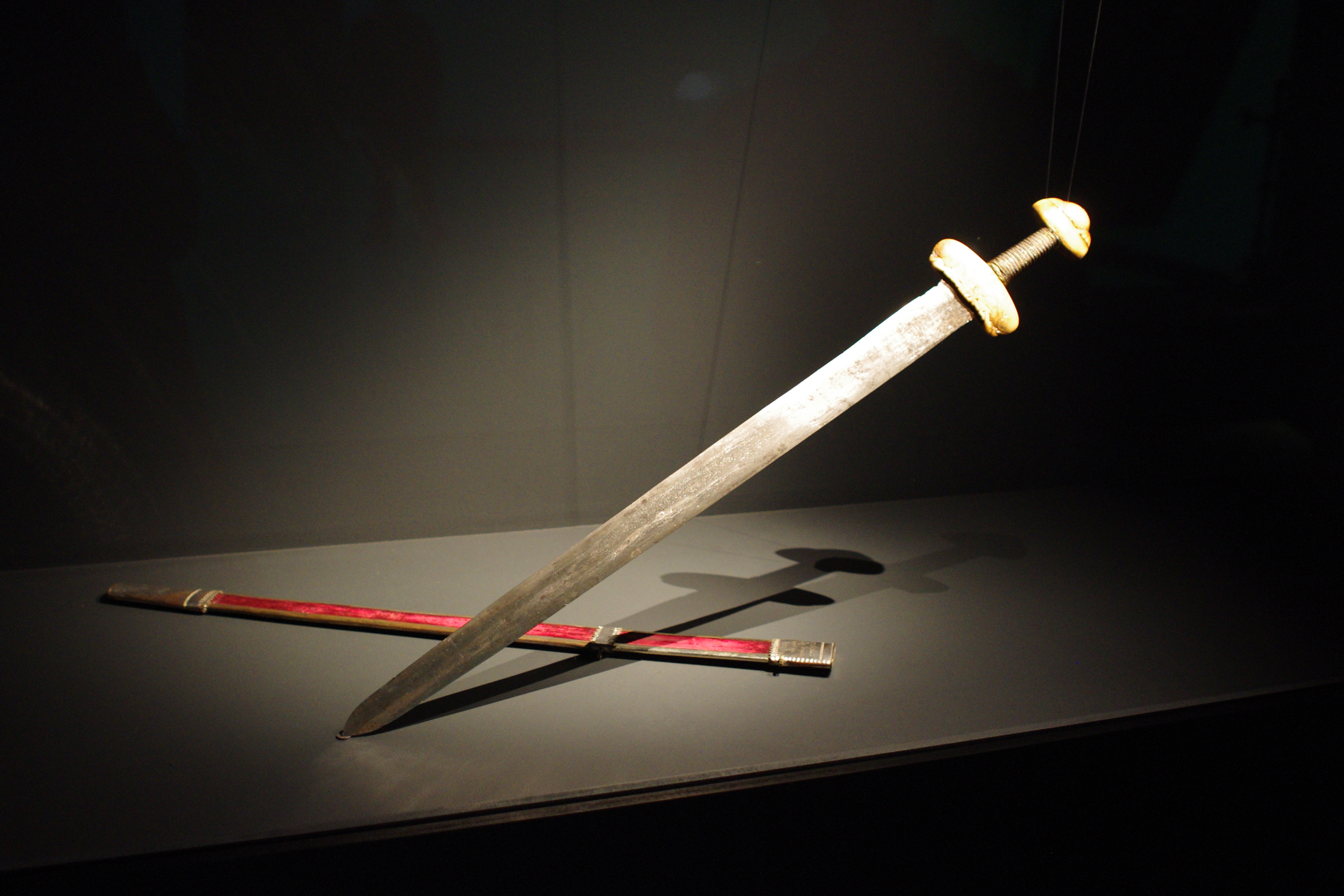
Sword of St. Stephen of Hungary
