= Radějovice (Prague-East District) =

- Municipality
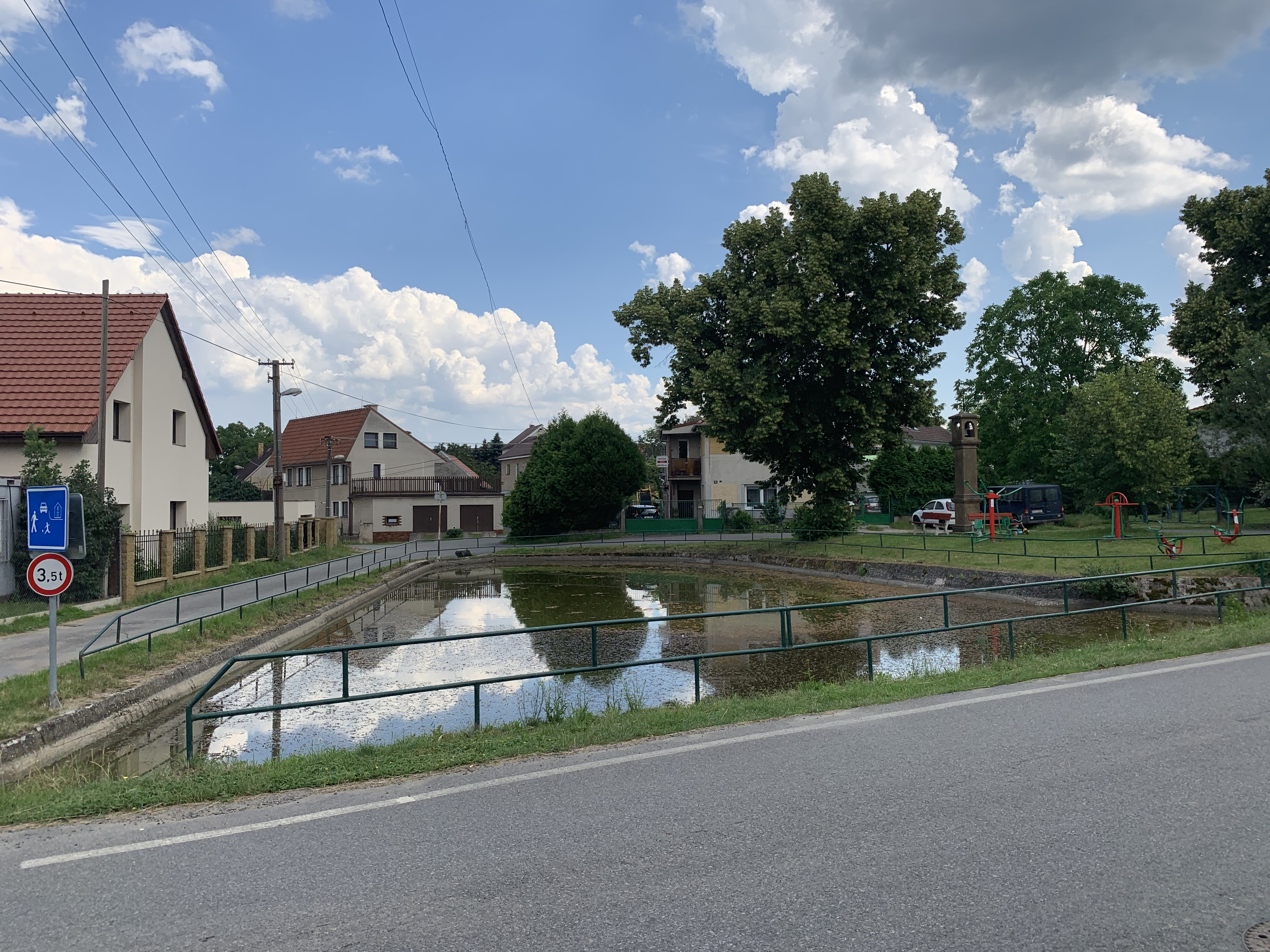
- Centre of Radějovice

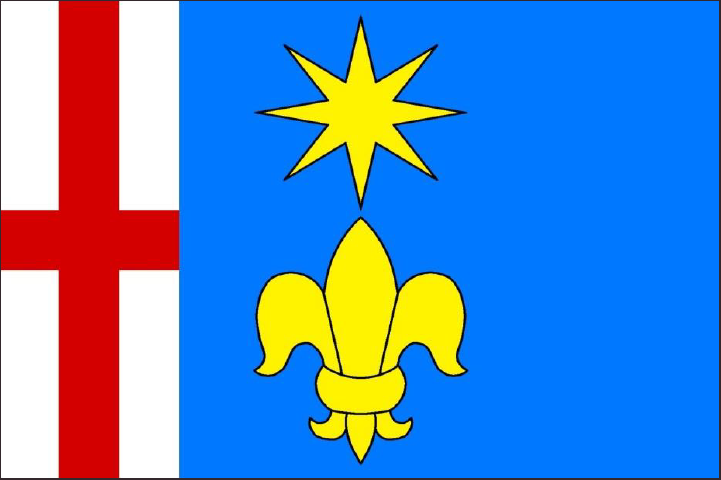
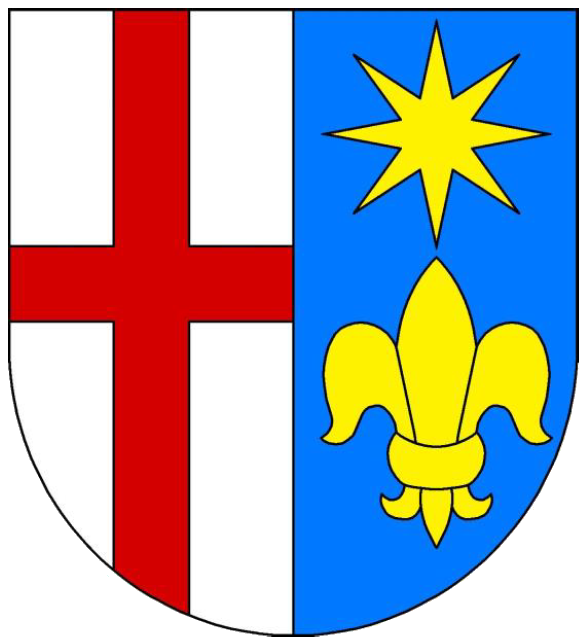
- Flag Coat of arms

- Location in the Czech Republic
- Coordinates: 49°56′50″N 14°33′53″E
- Country: Czech Republic
- Region: Central Bohemian
- District: Prague-East
- First mentioned: 1227

Area
  - Total: 5.09 km^{2} (1.97 sq mi)
- Elevation: 412 m (1,352 ft)

Population (2026-01-01)
  - Total: 540
  - Density: 110/km^{2} (270/sq mi)
- Time zone: UTC+1 (CET)
  - Summer (DST): UTC+2 (CEST)
- Postal code: 251 68
- Website: www.radejoviceobec.cz

Radějovice is a municipality and village in Prague-East District in the Central Bohemian Region of the Czech Republic. It has about 500 inhabitants.

== Administrative division ==
Radějovice consists of two municipal parts (in brackets population according to the 2021 census):

- Radějovice (366)
- Olešky (207)

== Etymology ==
The name is derived from the personal name Raděj, meaning "the village of Raděj's people".

== Geography ==
Radějovice is located about 10 kilometres (6 mi) southeast of Prague. It lies in the Benešov Uplands. The highest point is at 456 m (1,496 ft) above sea level.

== History ==
The first written mention of Radějovice is from 1227. In 1228, the village was documented as the possession of the Benedictine St. George's Convent at Prague Castle. Then the village was divided into several parts, owned by different nobles. This state lasted for several centuries until the establishment of a sovereign municipality in 1848.

== Demographics ==
Historical population

Year	Pop.	±%
1869	361	—
1880	360	−0.3%
1890	378	+5.0%
1900	362	−4.2%
1910	356	−1.7%

Year	Pop.	±%
1921	325	−8.7%
1930	299	−8.0%
1950	241	−19.4%
1961	233	−3.3%
1970	202	−13.3%

Year	Pop.	±%
1980	176	−12.9%
1991	134	−23.9%
2001	188	+40.3%
2011	332	+76.6%
2021	573	+72.6%

Source: Censuses

== Transport ==
There are no railways or major roads passing through the municipality.

== Sights ==
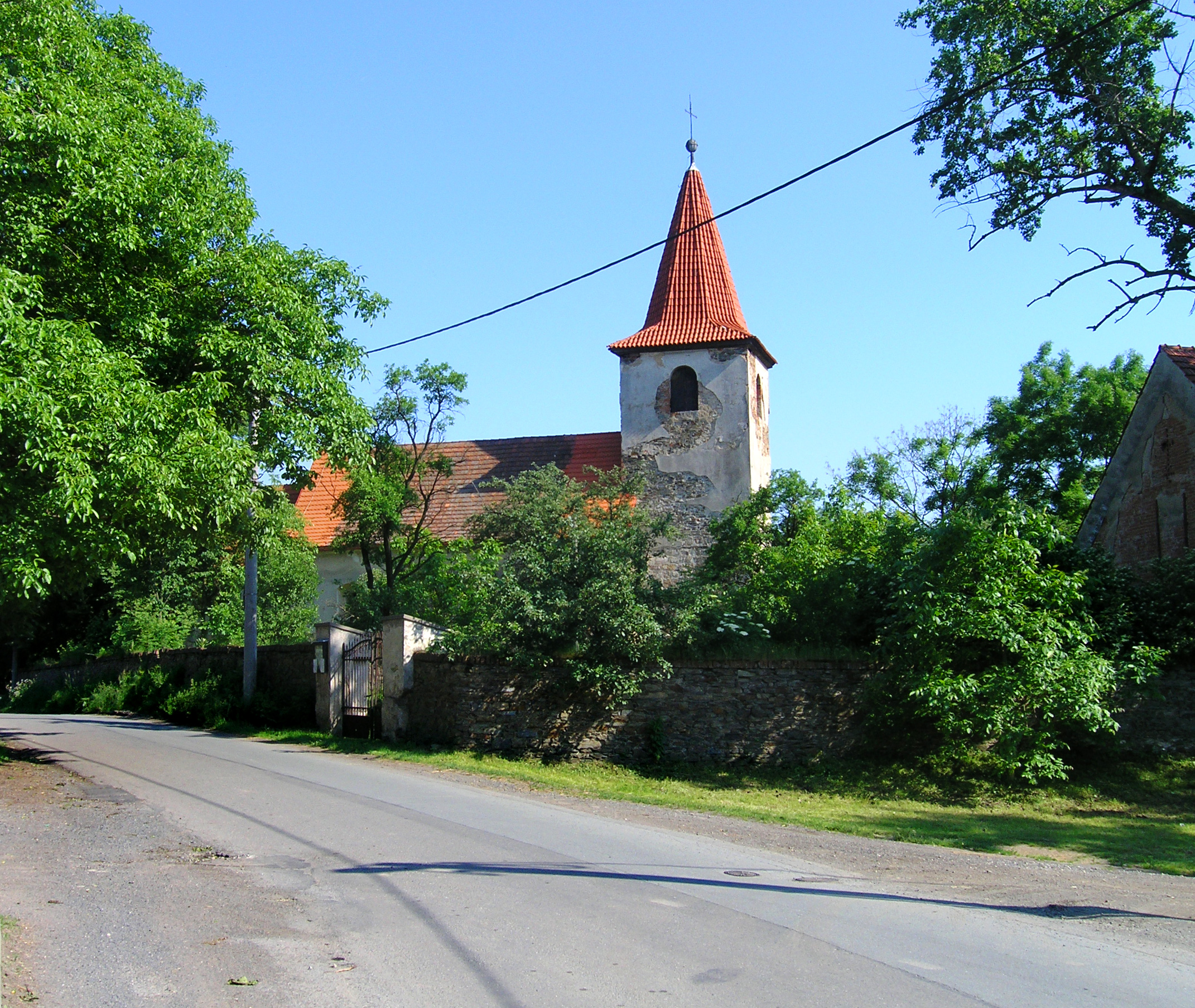
Church of the Nativity of the Virgin Mary

The main landmark is the Church of the Nativity of the Virgin Mary, located in Olešky. It was built in the Romanesque style in the first half of the 13th century. Later it was rebuilt in the Gothic and Baroque styles.
