= Matthias of Arras =

French architect (c.1290–1352)

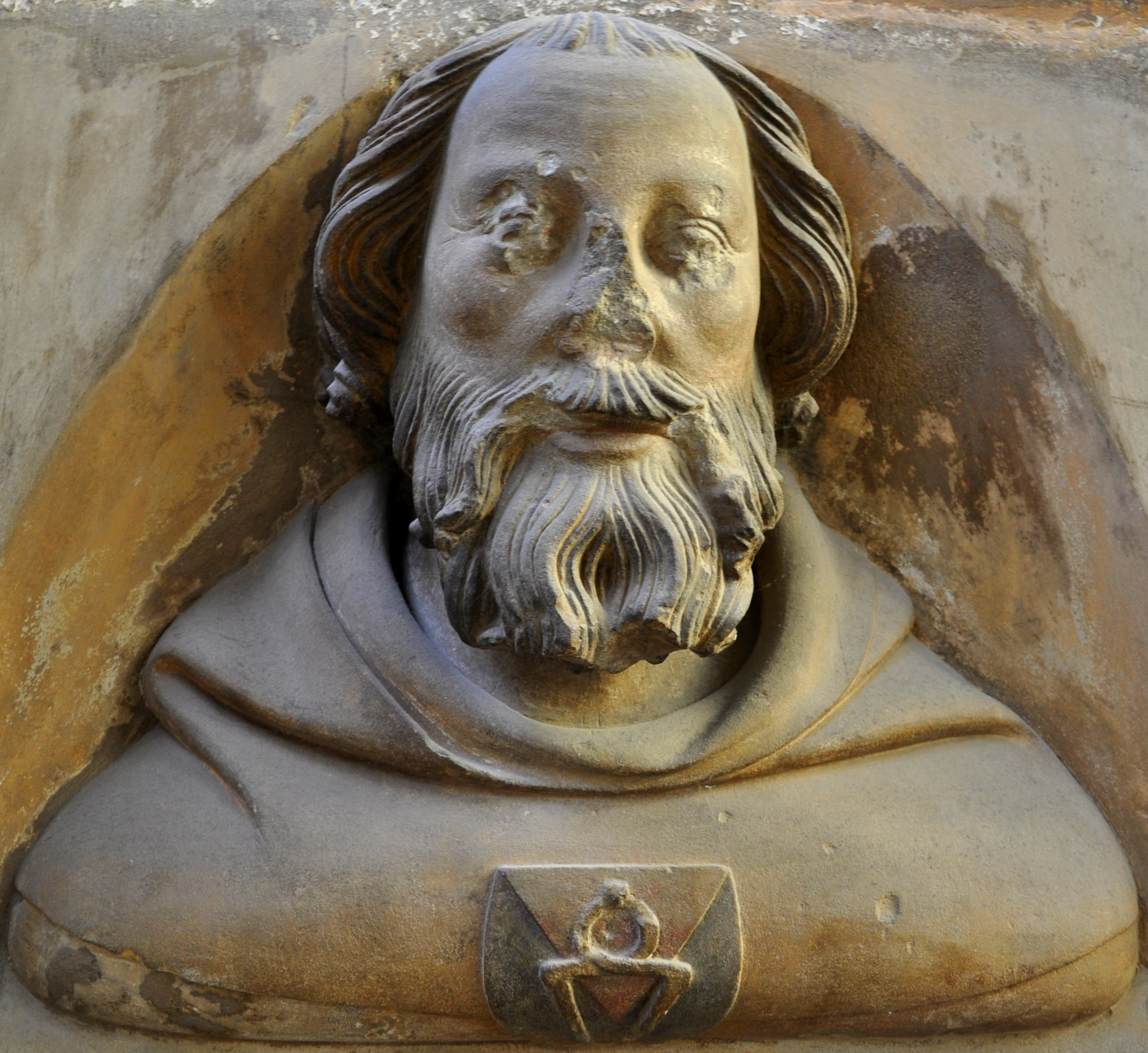
- Bust of Matthias in the St. Vitus Cathedral by Peter Parler.
- Born: c. 1290; Arras, Kingdom of France (present-day France)
- Died: 1352; Prague, Kingdom of Bohemia (present-day Czech Republic)
- Known for: Architecture
- Notable work: St. Vitus Cathedral in Prague
- Movement: Gothic

Matthias of Arras (c.1290–1352), sometimes spelled as Matthew of Arras (Czech: Matyáš z Arrasu, German: Matthias von Arras, French: Mathieu d'Arras) was a French architect, famed for his work on St. Vitus Cathedral in Prague.

Matthias was born in Arras, but little else is known about his early life. In 1344, he was summoned to Prague from the papal court of Avignon by Charles IV to lead works on the newly founded Saint Vitus Cathedral. He is also widely recognized as the architect of Karlstein Castle, although this fact is not fully authenticated. His involvement in the design of the New Town of Prague is also not completely certain.

When Matthias died at Prague in 1352, Saint Vitus Cathedral was not yet completed. The role of its master mason and Charles' head architect fell to then twenty-three years old Peter Parler.

== St. Vitus Cathedral ==
Matthias of Arras planned the construction of the cathedral for two years. He designed it in the style of the South French Gothic cathedrals of Rodez and Narbonne. Charles IV appointed Matthias master of the building works and the cathedral builder. Matyáš thus established his building works in Hradčany. The cathedral's construction began in 1344 after he arrived in Prague with the royal entourage of Charles IV.

On 21 November 1344, John of Luxembourg laid the foundation stone of St. Vitus Cathedral in connection with the elevation of the Prague bishopric to an archbishopric. Two of the king's sons, Charles IV and John Henry, were present, as was the Archbishop of Prague, Arnost of Pardubice.

Matthias of Arras began construction with the eastern chancel to celebrate mass. He built eight chapels with identical floor plans in the horseshoe-shaped choir and the end of the choir with arcades up to the triforium. The whole is sober and simple. In the south, he began the construction of the Chapel of the Holy Cross, which was initially located separately outside the part of the cathedral being built.

Matthias of Arras worked on the cathedral for eight years. He died in 1352 at the age of sixty-two. He is buried in St. Vitus Cathedral, where he also has a sandstone tombstone.

Charles IV searched for a successor for the unfinished cathedral and succeeded only after four years. The young Peter Parléř, only twenty-three years old, was born in Swabian Gmünd and came from a distinguished family of builders. He took over the management of the building in 1356.

== Other buildings ==
Charles IV also consulted with Matthias of Arras over the plans for the New Town of Prague and the Týn Cathedral. The plans were well thought out, as Charles IV took the capital of the Holy Roman Empire and Jerusalem as a model. Straight streets, squares, churches, walls and gates were designed, which still form the basis of the city of Prague.

Charles IV was concerned with Christian mysticism and symbolism in building the city. The five churches forming a regular cross can be seen from above, oriented towards the old royal residence at Vyšehrad. These five churches forming the cross were to bring great blessings to the city. They are the Church of the Virgin Mary and the Emmaus Monastery (founded in 1347), the Church of the Assumption of the Virgin Mary and St. Charles the Great with the Monastery at Charles (1350), the Church of St. Catherine (1355), the Church of the Annunciation of the Virgin Mary on the Lawn (1360) and the Church of St. Apollinaris (1362).

== Literature ==
- Mencl Václav: Czech Architecture of the Luxemburg Period, Artia, Prague, 1955
- České umění gotické, Prague, 1970
- V. Mencl: Poklasická gotika jižní Francie a Švábska a její vztah ke gotice české. In Umění 19, 1971, page 217.
- A. Merhautová: Katedrála sv. Víta v Praze, Prague, 1994
- Y. Gallet: "Autoportrait et représentation de soi au Moyen Âge : le cas de Matthieu d’Arras à la cathédrale de Prague", In: Le Moyen Âge, t. 122-1 : Autoportrait et représentation de l’individu, 2016, p. 41-65.
- Y. Gallet: "L’escalier d’Ulrich von Ensingen à la cathédrale de Strasbourg et ses rapports avec l’œuvre de Matthieu d’Arras à la cathédrale de Prague", In: J. Chlíbec and Z. Opačić (eds.), Setkávání. Studie o středověkém umění věnované Kláře Benešovské, Prague, Artefactum / Ústav dějin umění, 2015, p. 97-109.
- Y. Gallet: "Matthieu d’Arras et l’Alsace. Les relations architecturales entre les cathédrales de Strasbourg et Prague avant Peter Parler", In: Bulletin de la cathédrale de Strasbourg, XXX, 2012, p. 19-40.

== See also ==
- Czech Gothic architecture
