= St. George's Basilica, Prague =

Basilica church in Prague

Basilica of St George
- Bazilika sv. Jiří
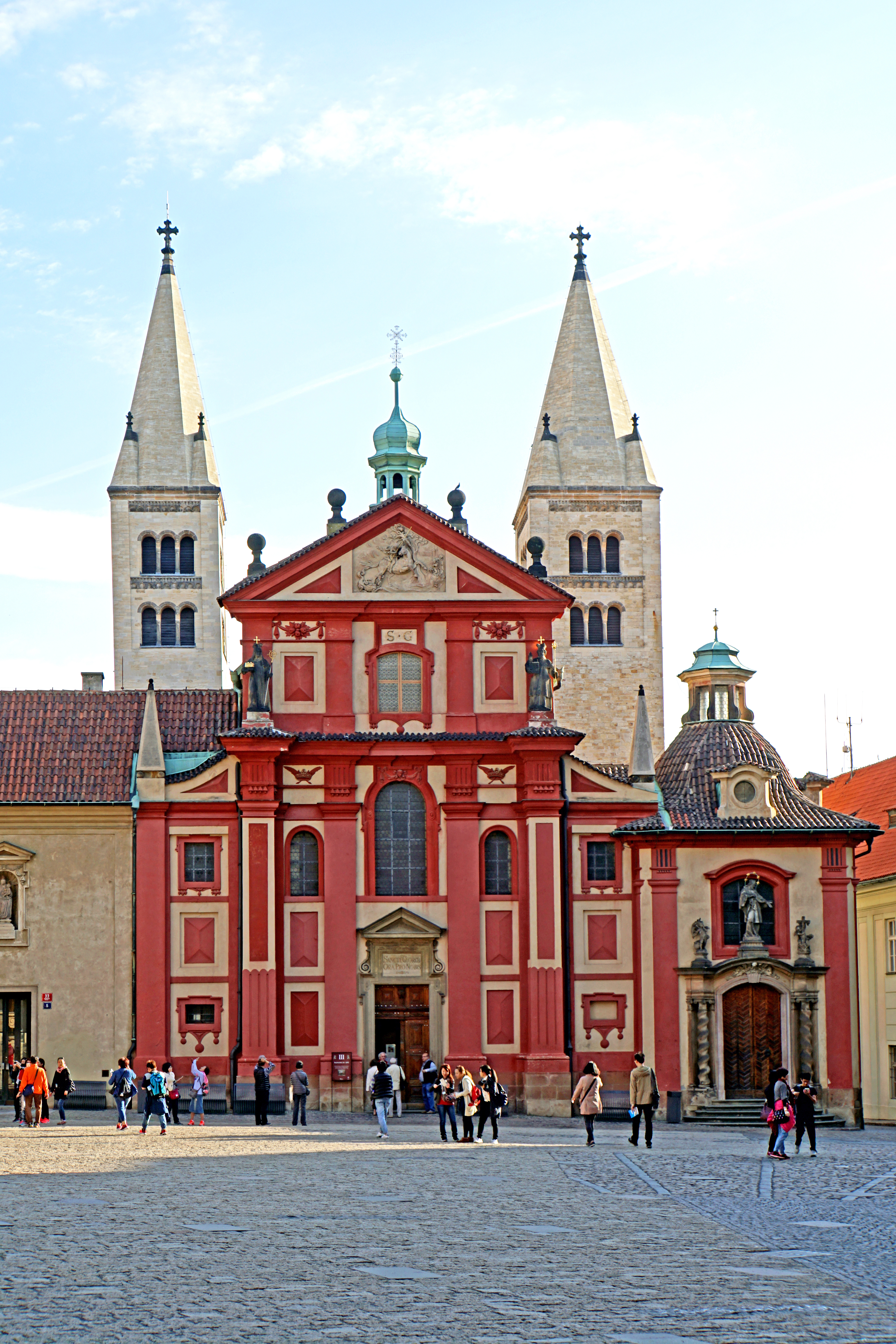
- Basilica of St George with its two towers in the background

- Location in Czech Republic
- 50°05′28″N 14°24′09″E
- Location: Prague
- Country: Czech Republic
- Denomination: Roman Catholic

History
- Founded: 920
- Founder: Vratislaus I of Bohemia
- Dedication: Saint George

Architecture
- Style: Romanesque

St. George's Basilica (Czech: Bazilika sv. Jiří) is the oldest surviving church building within Prague Castle, Prague, Czech Republic. The basilica was founded by Vratislaus I of Bohemia in 920. It is dedicated to Saint George. Primarily Romanesque in style, it is part of the collection of buildings that comprise the castle, the political capital of the nation, and the spiritual center of the Czech state. It is the burial place of several highly notable Czech nobles, dukes, and saints, such as St. Ludmila.

== Background ==
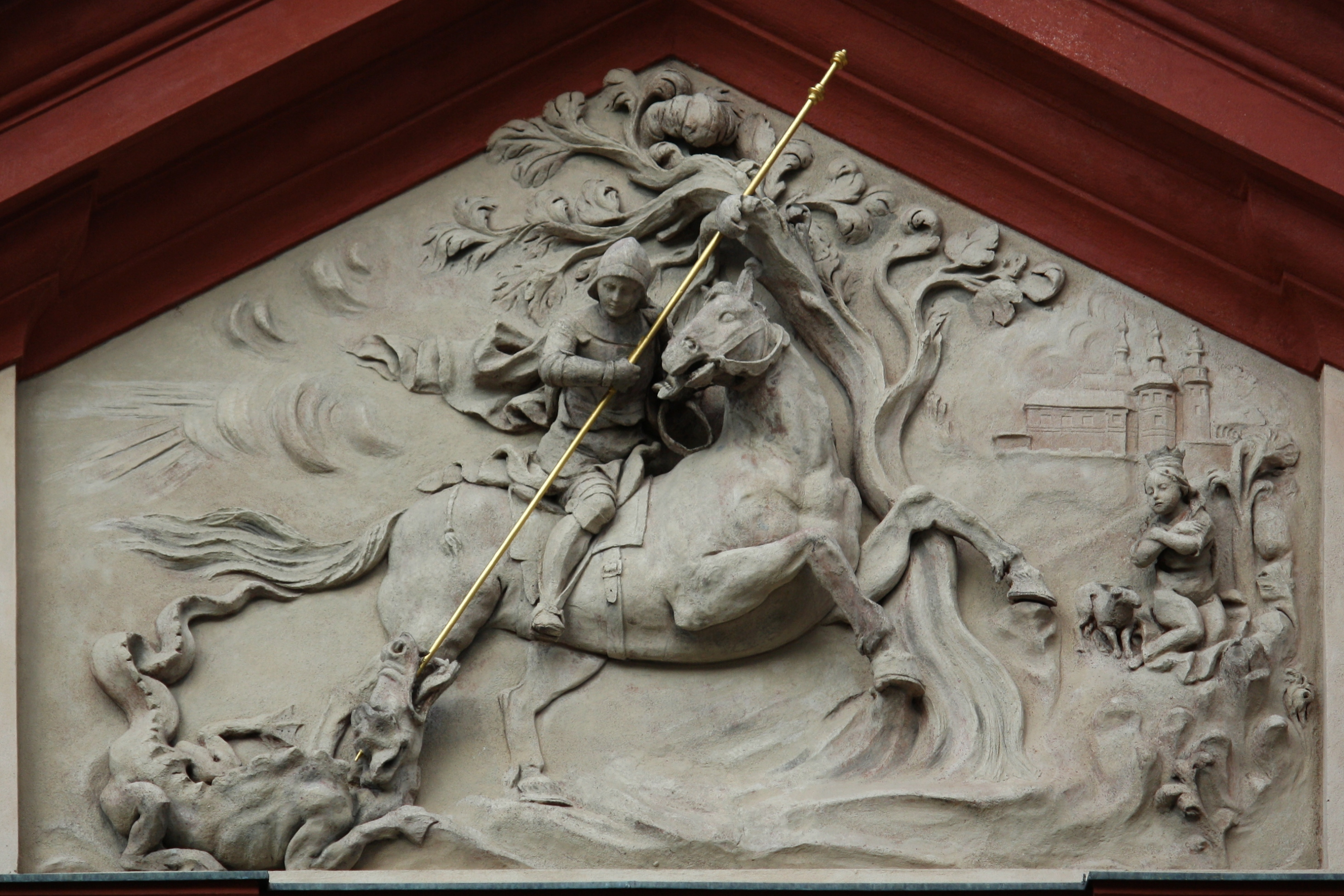
Relief on the west façade: St. George slays the dragon.

Consecrated in 921, the basilica is one of the oldest churches in Prague built in the Romanesque style. The construction of the church was begun by Vratislaus I. At the time of Vratislaus' death in 921, the church had been completed but not consecrated. Wenceslaus I completed the project, and upon her death he buried his grandmother, Ludmila of Bohemia there.

The basilica was prominent at the beginning of the spread of Christianity in Bohemia. Its collegiate church was at the center of the territory until the foundation of the Archdiocese of Prague in 973. In 976, the first building of the Benedictine St. George's Convent was erected on the north side of the basilica, and the basilica served as a convent church. The original three-nave building was completed with a choir, a tribune for the nuns of the convent and a crypt.

Founded in 973 by Mlada, the St. George's Convent, Prague sits next to the basilica. The abbess of this community had the right to crown the Bohemian queen consort.

In 1142, Conrad III entered Bohemia to reinstate his brother-in-law Vladislaus II as duke. Conrad laid siege to the Prague Castle. During the siege, the church and convent suffered heavy damage caused by a fire. The damage was repaired between 1145 and 1151 and two towers were added to the church on that occasion. The northern, smaller tower is nicknamed "Eve", while the southern, larger, tower is nicknamed "Adam". The Baroque façade dates from the late 17th century.

In the years 1364–1378 the abbess Elisabetta completed the renovation of the chapel of Santa Ludmilla in the Gothic style, while the chapel's altar was consecrated in 1371 by Archbishop Jan Očko of Vlašim. During the 15th century, the monastery was devastated during the Hussite Wars and rebuilt after the return of the Benedictines under Sigismund of Luxembourg. At the beginning of the 16th century, a new southern portal was built. During the fire of 1541, the basilica burned down again and was rebuilt again. Between 1608 and 1612, the Abbess Sophia of Helfenburg had a large choir for the nuns built in the western part of the central nave. In the late 17th century the Baroque façade was built, probably under the direction of Francesco Caratti. Between 1717 and 1722, the chapel of St. John of Nepomuk was erected by František Maxmilián Kaňka. A bas-relief on the south portal of the building represents Saint George and the Dragon.

In the 1780s, the condition of the buildings had deteriorated when Joseph II disbanded the monastic orders, and the monastery and basilica were repurposed and used by the army.

With the exception of some elements of the façade, and interior of the church, the basilica has maintained the Romanesque style from the restoration after the fire in Prague Castle in 1142. A bas-relief on the outside of the building represents Saint George and the dragon.

== Interior ==
Unlike the baroque and rococo churches of Prague, the interior of the basilica is simple and austere limestone block. The church is a three-aisled basilica with two towers located on the eastern end of the church, at the end of the two side aisles. It begins with a square presbytery, and ends in an apse. There is a three-nave crypt under the chancel.

The mausoleum holds the tombs of the members of Přemyslid dynasty and the relics of many saints.

Burials

- Ludmila of Bohemia, grandmother of Wenceslaus I and patron of the Kingdom of Bohemia
- Vratislaus I, Duke of Bohemia
- Agnes of Bohemia
- Jaromír, Duke of Bohemia
- Oldřich, Duke of Bohemia
- Boleslaus II, Duke of Bohemia
- Kunigunde of Bohemia

== Current usage ==
Holy mass is celebrated every Saturday at 5PM.

The basilica is part of the Prague castle complex of buildings. The castle was the political capital of the nation and the basilica was part of its spiritual center.

In 1962, the building was declared a national cultural monument and converted into a concert hall. Between 1969 and 1975, it was converted into an exhibition space. The building now houses the 19th century Bohemian Art Collection of National Gallery Prague. It also serves as a concert hall.

== Gallery ==
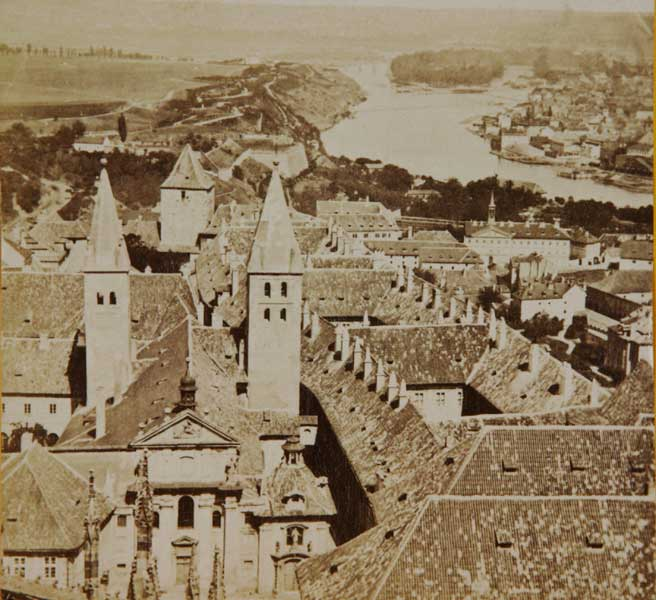
View from the Prague Cathedral in 1867

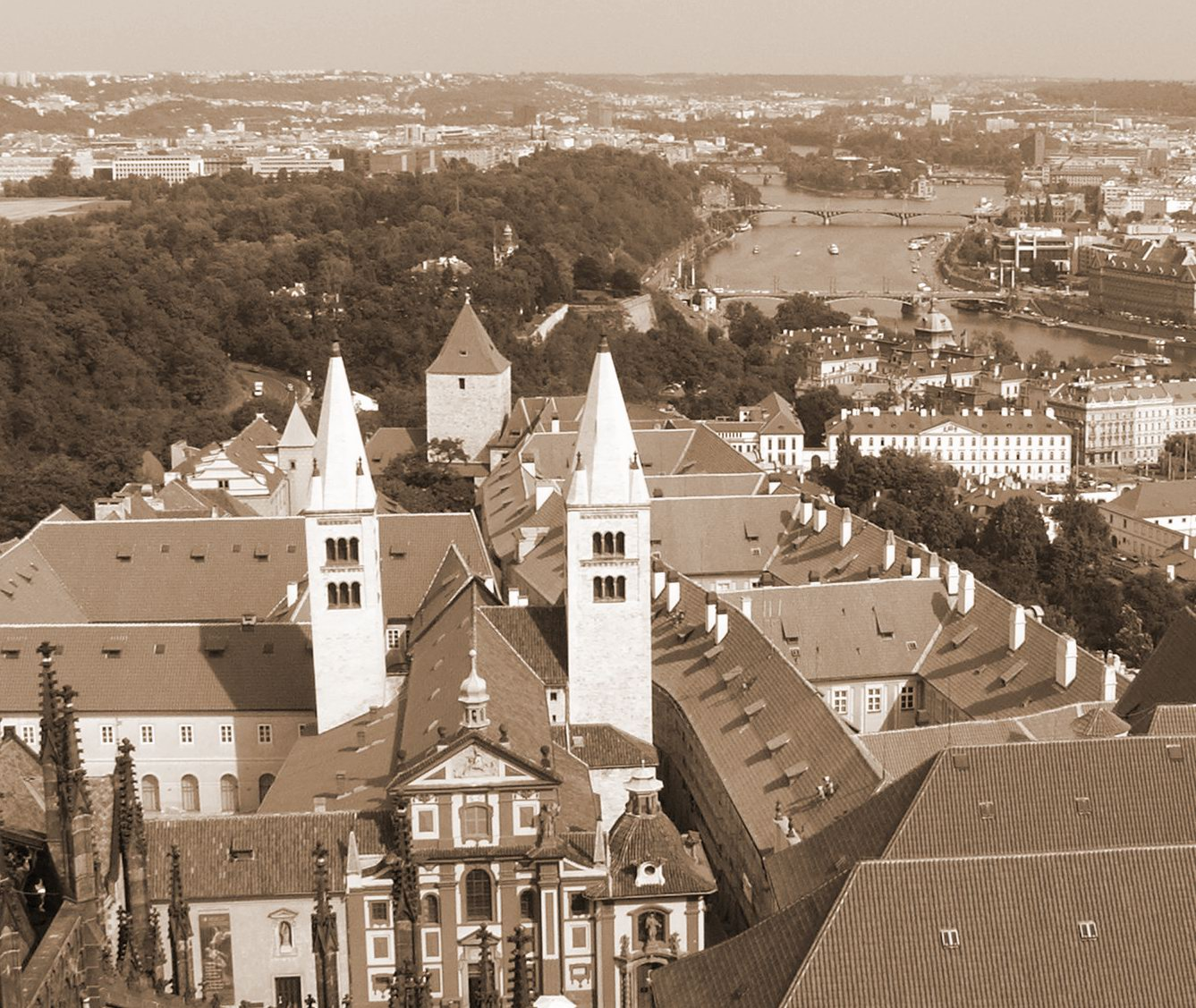
View from the Cathedral in 2005

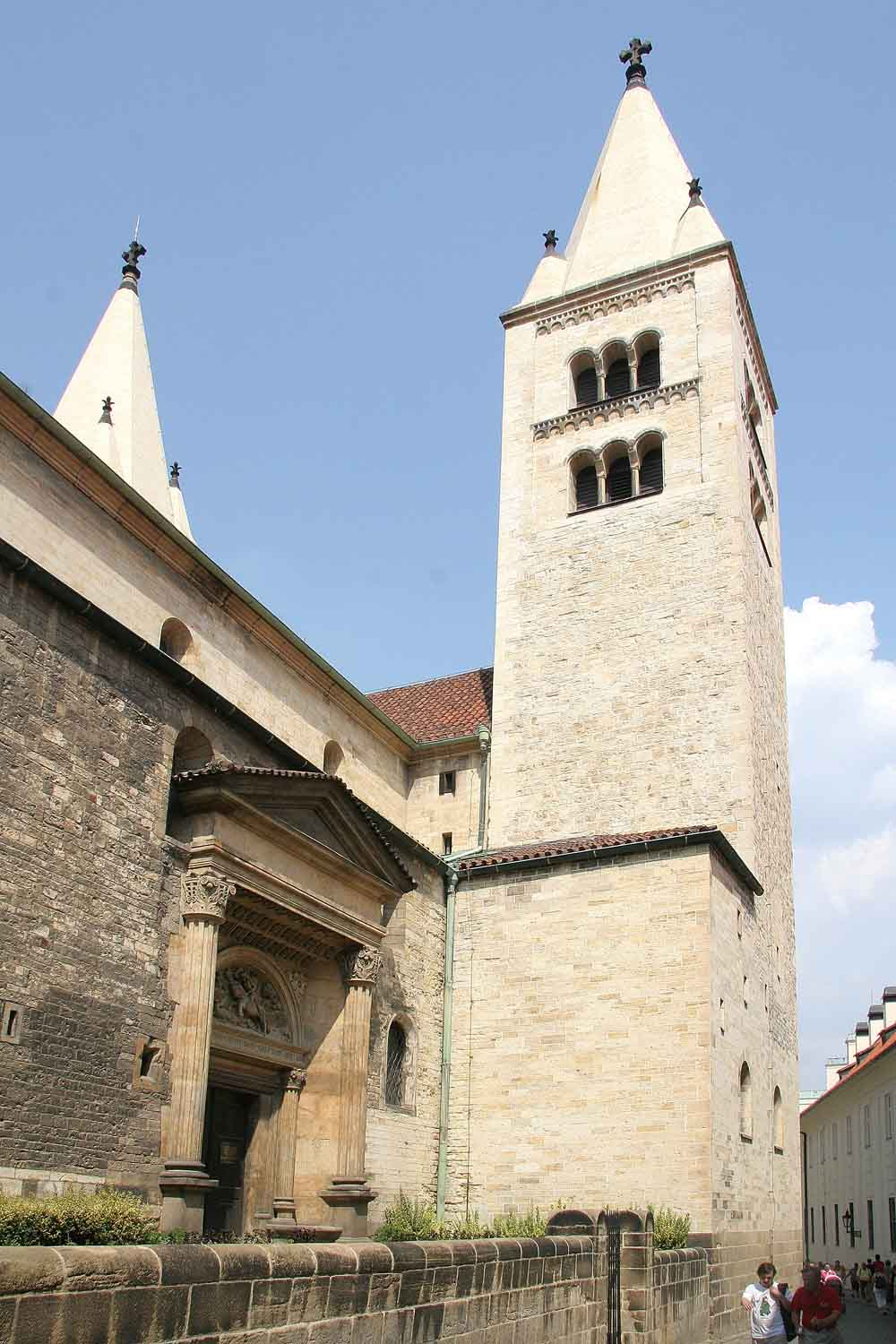
Basilica - eastern side

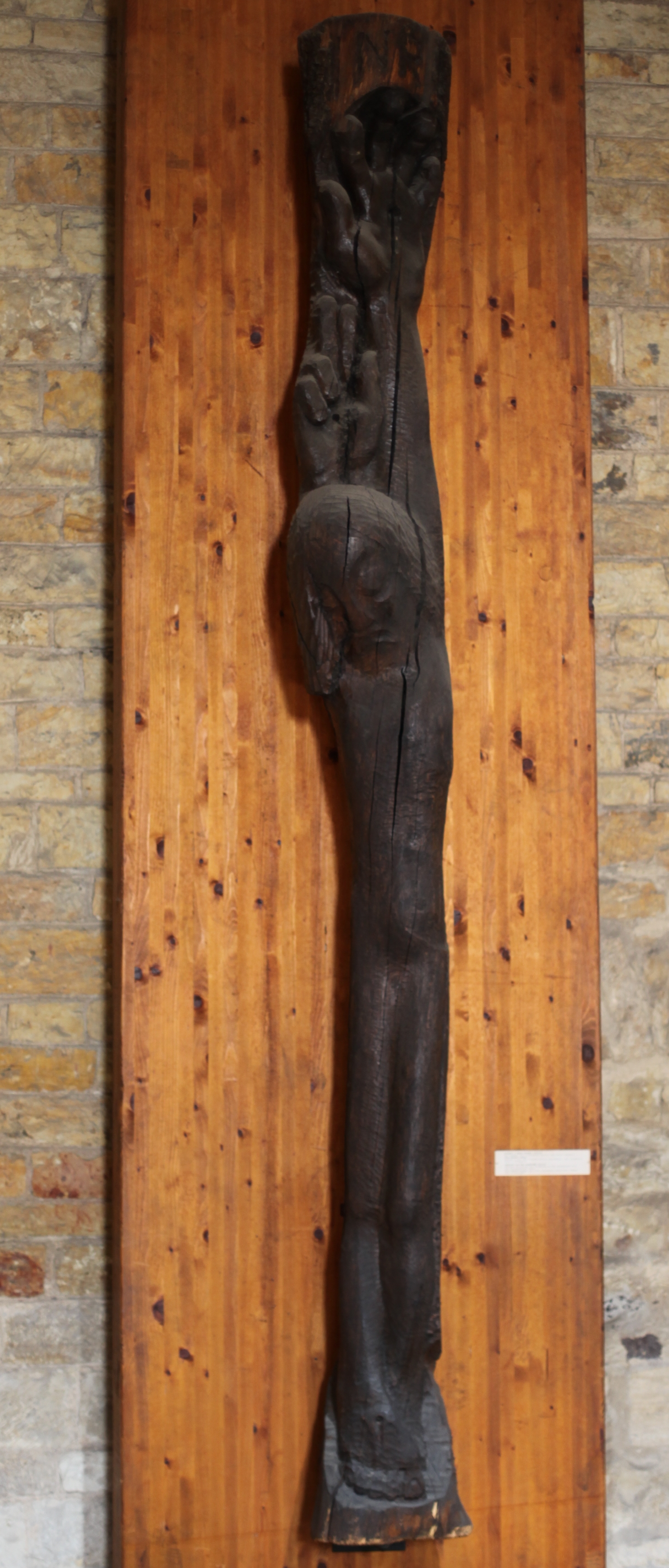
View inside – Christ – 1947 By OH Hajek

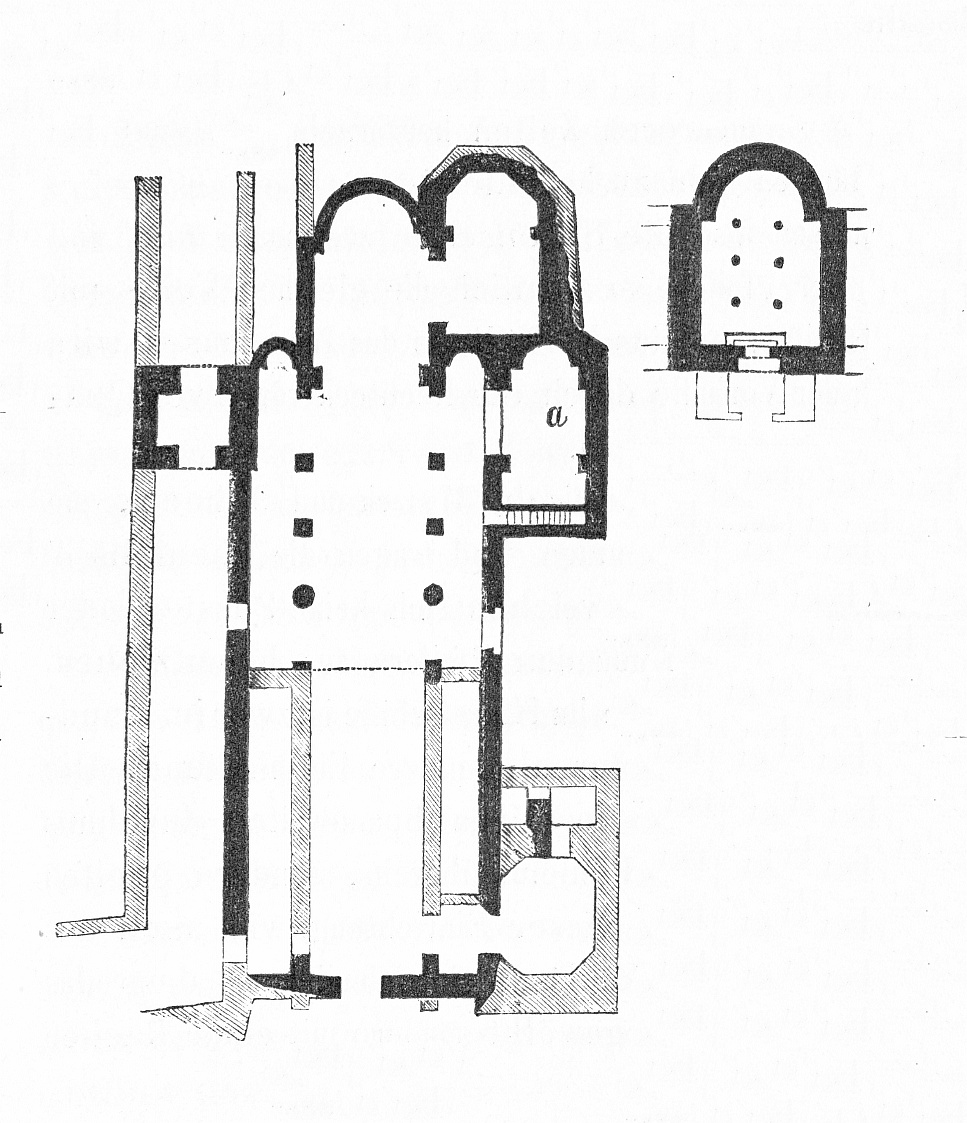
Floor plan from 1856

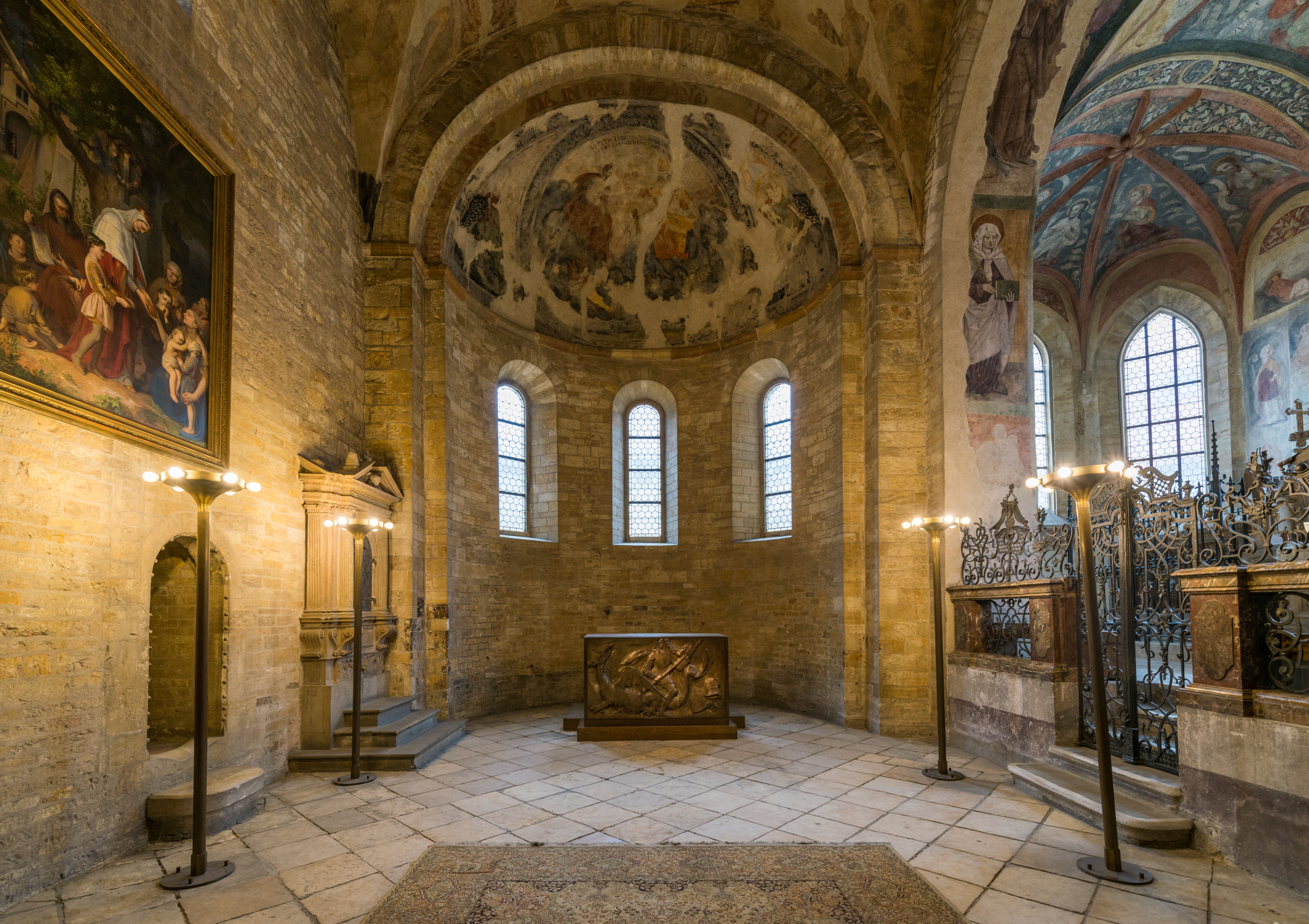
Interior view of the apse

== See also ==
- St. Vitus Cathedral
- National Gallery Prague

== Bibliography ==
- Merhautová-Livorová, Anežka (1972). Die St. Georgs-Basilika auf der Prager Burg (in German). Prague: Odeon.
