= St. Vitus Cathedral =

- The Metropolitan Cathedral of Saints Vitus, Wenceslaus and Adalbert
- Czech: Katedrála svatého Víta, Václava a Vojtěcha
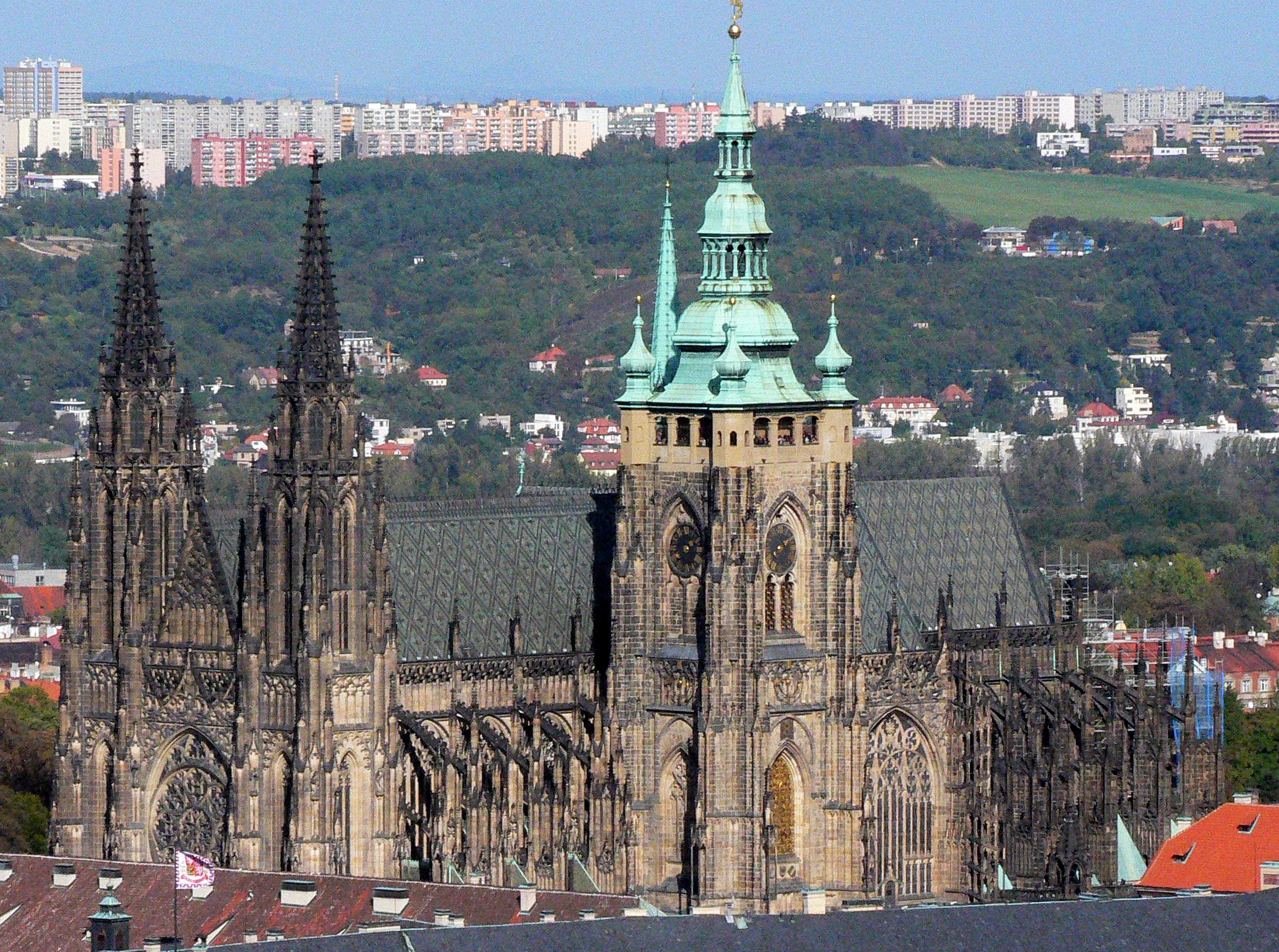
- St. Vitus Cathedral is situated entirely within the Prague Castle complex.

- Location within Prague
- 50°05′27″N 14°24′02″E
- Location: Prague
- Country: Czech Republic
- Denomination: Catholic
- Sui iuris church: Latin Church
- Website: katedralasvatehovita.cz

History
- Status: Cathedral
- Founded: c. 930; 1344 (current church)
- Consecrated: 12 May 1929

Architecture
- Functional status: Active
- Architect(s): Peter Parler, Matthias of Arras
- Architectural type: Church
- Style: Mostly Gothic and Gothic revival
- Completed: 1929

Specifications
- Length: 124 m (407 ft)
- Width: 60 m (200 ft)

Administration
- Archdiocese: Prague

Clergy
- Archbishop: Stanislav Přibyl
- Dean: Ondřej Pávek
- Pastor: Milan Hanuš

Easter ringing of the Cathedral's bells (2012)

The Metropolitan Cathedral of Saints Vitus, Wenceslaus and Adalbert (Czech: metropolitní katedrála svatého Víta, Václava a Vojtěcha) is a Catholic metropolitan cathedral in Prague, and the seat of the Archbishop of Prague. Until 1997, the cathedral was dedicated only to Saint Vitus, and is still commonly named only as St. Vitus Cathedral (Czech: katedrála svatého Víta or svatovítská katedrála).

This cathedral is a prominent example of Gothic architecture, and is the largest and most important church in the country. Located within Prague Castle and containing the tombs of many Bohemian kings and Holy Roman Emperors, the cathedral is under the ownership of the Czech government as part of the Prague Castle complex. The cathedral's dimensions are 124 m × 60 m (407 ft × 197 ft), the main tower is 102.8 m (337 ft) high, front towers 82 m (269 ft), arch height 33.2 m (109 ft).

== History ==
=== Origins ===
The current cathedral is the third of a series of religious buildings at the site, all dedicated to St. Vitus. The first church was an early Romanesque rotunda founded by Wenceslaus I, Duke of Bohemia in 930. This patron saint was chosen because Wenceslaus had acquired a holy relic – the arm of St. Vitus – from Emperor Henry I. It is also possible that Wenceslaus, wanting to convert his subjects to Christianity more easily, chose a saint whose name (Svatý Vít in Czech) sounds very much like the name of Slavic solar deity Svantevit. Two religious populations, the increasing Christian and decreasing pagan community, lived simultaneously in Prague castle at least until the 11th century.

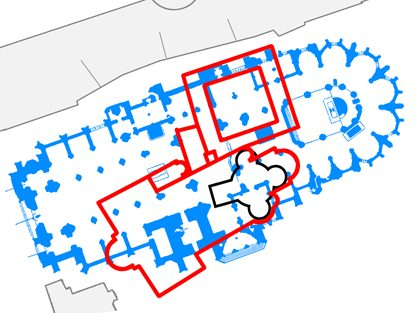
Ground plan of the cathedral (blue) with outlines of prior romanesque buildings (red and black)

In the year 1060, prince Spytihněv II embarked on building a more spacious church, as it became clear the existing rotunda was too small to accommodate the faithful. A much larger and more representative Romanesque basilica was built in its spot. Though still not completely reconstructed, most experts agree it was a triple-aisled basilica with two choirs and a pair of towers connected to the western transept. The design of the cathedral nods to Romanesque architecture of the Holy Roman Empire, most notably to the abbey church in Hildesheim and the Speyer Cathedral. The southern apse of the rotunda was incorporated into the eastern transept of the new church because it housed the tomb of St. Wenceslaus, who had by now become the patron saint of the Czech princes. A bishop's mansion was also built south of the new church, and was considerably enlarged and extended in the mid-12th century.

=== The Gothic cathedral ===
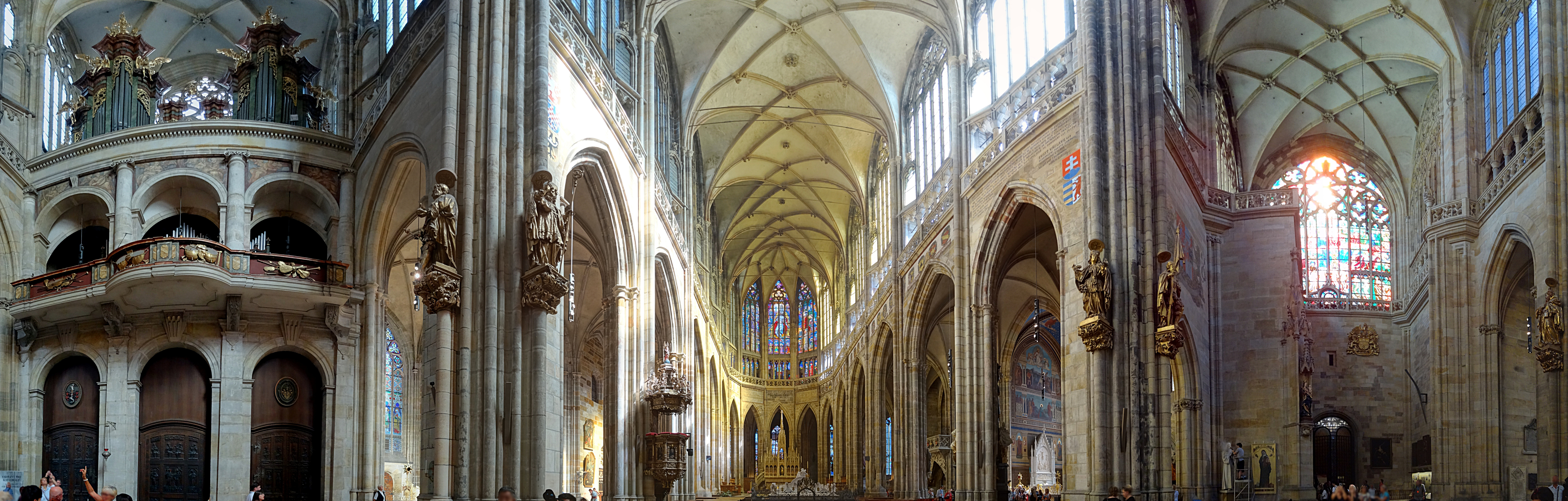
Panorama of the transept

Construction of the present-day Gothic cathedral began on 21 November 1344, when the seat of Prague was elevated to an archbishopric. King John of Bohemia laid the foundation stone for the new building. The patrons were the chapter of cathedral (led by a dean), the archbishop Arnost of Pardubice, and, above all, Charles IV, King of Bohemia and a soon-to-be Holy Roman Emperor, who intended the new cathedral to be a coronation church, family crypt, treasury for the most precious relics of the kingdom, and the last resting place cum pilgrimage site of patron saint Wenceslaus. The first master builder was a Frenchman Matthias of Arras, summoned from the Papal Palace in Avignon. Matthias designed the overall layout of the building as, basically, an import of French Gothic: a triple-naved basilica with flying buttresses, short transept, five-bayed choir and decagon apse with ambulatory and radiating chapels. However, he lived to build only the easternmost parts of the choir: the arcades and the ambulatory. The slender verticality of Late French Gothic and the clear rigid respect of proportions, most notably reminiscent of Rodez Cathedral, distinguish his work today.

After Matthias' death in 1352, 23-year-old Peter Parler assumed control of the cathedral workshop as master builder. He was son of the architect of the Heilig-Kreuz-Münster in Schwäbisch Gmünd. Initially, Parler only worked on plans left by his predecessor, building the sacristy on the north side of the choir and the chapel on the south. Once he finished all that Matthias left unfinished, he continued according to his own ideas. Parler's bold and innovative design brought in a unique new synthesis of Gothic elements in architecture. This is best exemplified in the vaults he designed for the choir. The so-called Parler's vaults or net-vaults have double (not single, as in classic High Gothic groin vaults) diagonal ribs that span the width of the choir-bay. The crossing pairs of ribs create a net-like construction (hence the name), which considerably strengthens the vault. They also give a lively ornamentation to the ceiling, as the interlocking vaulted bays create a dynamic zigzag pattern the length of the cathedral.

Mosaic of the Last Judgment at the Golden Gate (annotated)

While Matthias of Arras was schooled as a geometer, thus putting an emphasis on rigid systems of proportions and clear, mathematical compositions in his design, Parler was trained as a sculptor and woodcarver. He treated architecture as a sculpture, almost as if playing with structural forms in stone. Aside from his bold vaults, the peculiarities of his work can also be seen in the design of pillars (with classic, bell-shaped columns which were almost forgotten by High Gothic), the ingenious dome vault of new St. Wenceslaus chapel, the undulating clerestory walls, the original window tracery (no two of his windows are the same, the ornamentation is always different) and the blind tracery panels of the buttresses. Architectural sculpture was given a considerable role while Parler was in charge of construction, as can be seen in the corbels, the passageway lintels, and, particularly, in the busts on the triforium, which depict faces of the royal family, saints, Prague bishops, and the two master builders, including Parler himself.

Work on the cathedral, however, proceeded slowly, because the Emperor commissioned Parler with many other projects, such as the construction of the new Charles Bridge in Prague and many churches throughout the Czech realm. By 1397, when Peter Parler died, only the choir and parts of the transept were finished.

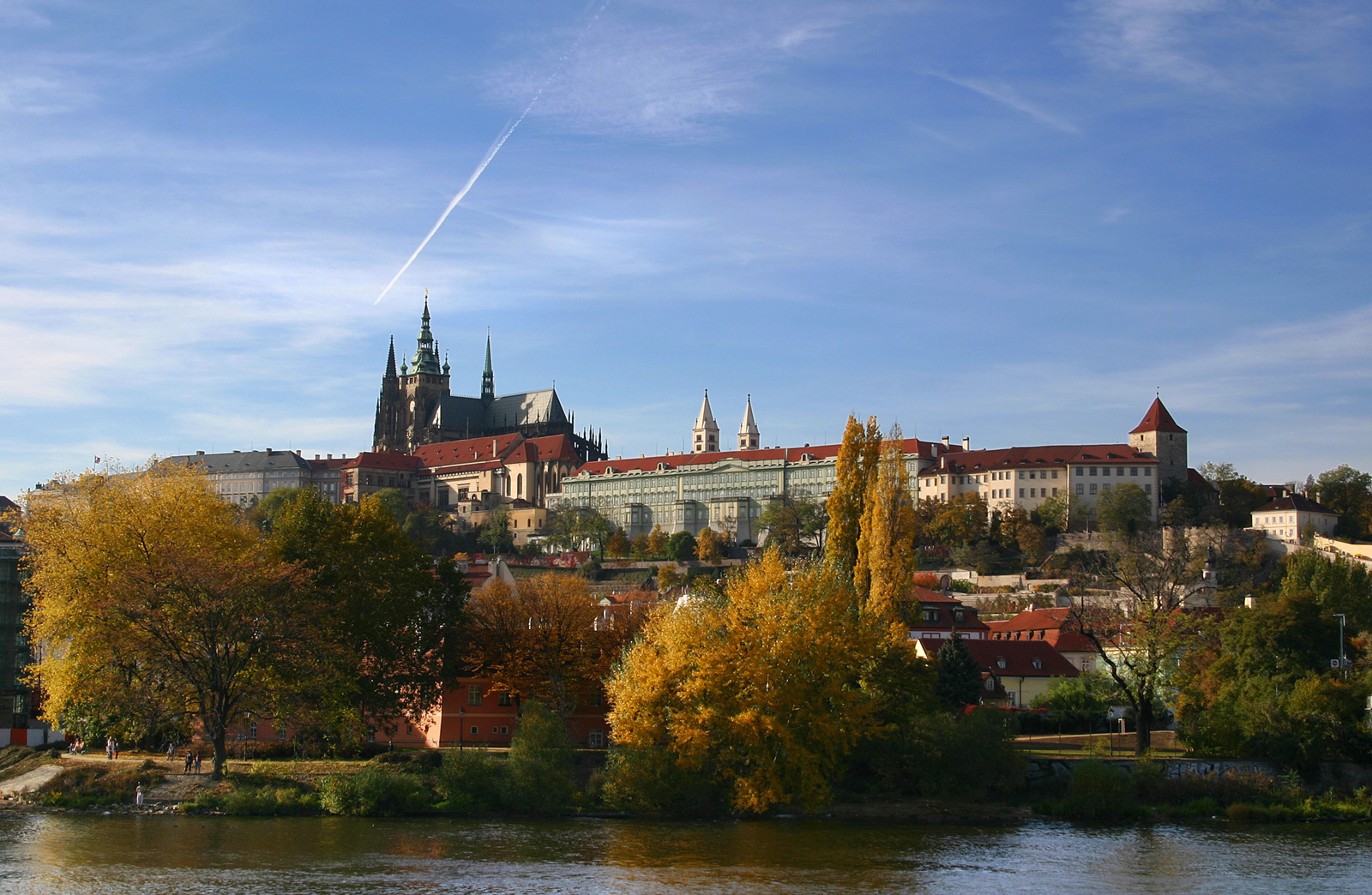
View of the cathedral and Prague Castle above the river Vltava

After Peter Parler's death in 1399 his sons, Wenzel Parler and particularly Johannes Parler, continued his work; they in turn were succeeded by a certain Master Petrilk, who by all accounts was also a member of Parler's workshop. Under these three masters, the transept and the great tower on its south side were finished. So was the gable which connects the tower with the south transept. Nicknamed 'Golden Gate' (likely because of the golden mosaic of Last Judgment depicted on it), it is through this portal that the kings entered the cathedral for coronation ceremonies.

The entire building process came to a halt with the beginning of Hussite War in the first half of 15th century. The war brought an end to the workshop that operated steadily over for almost a century, and the furnishings of cathedral, dozens of pictures and sculptures, suffered heavily from the ravages of Hussite iconoclasm. As if this was not enough, a great fire in 1541 heavily damaged the cathedral.

==== St. Wenceslaus Chapel ====
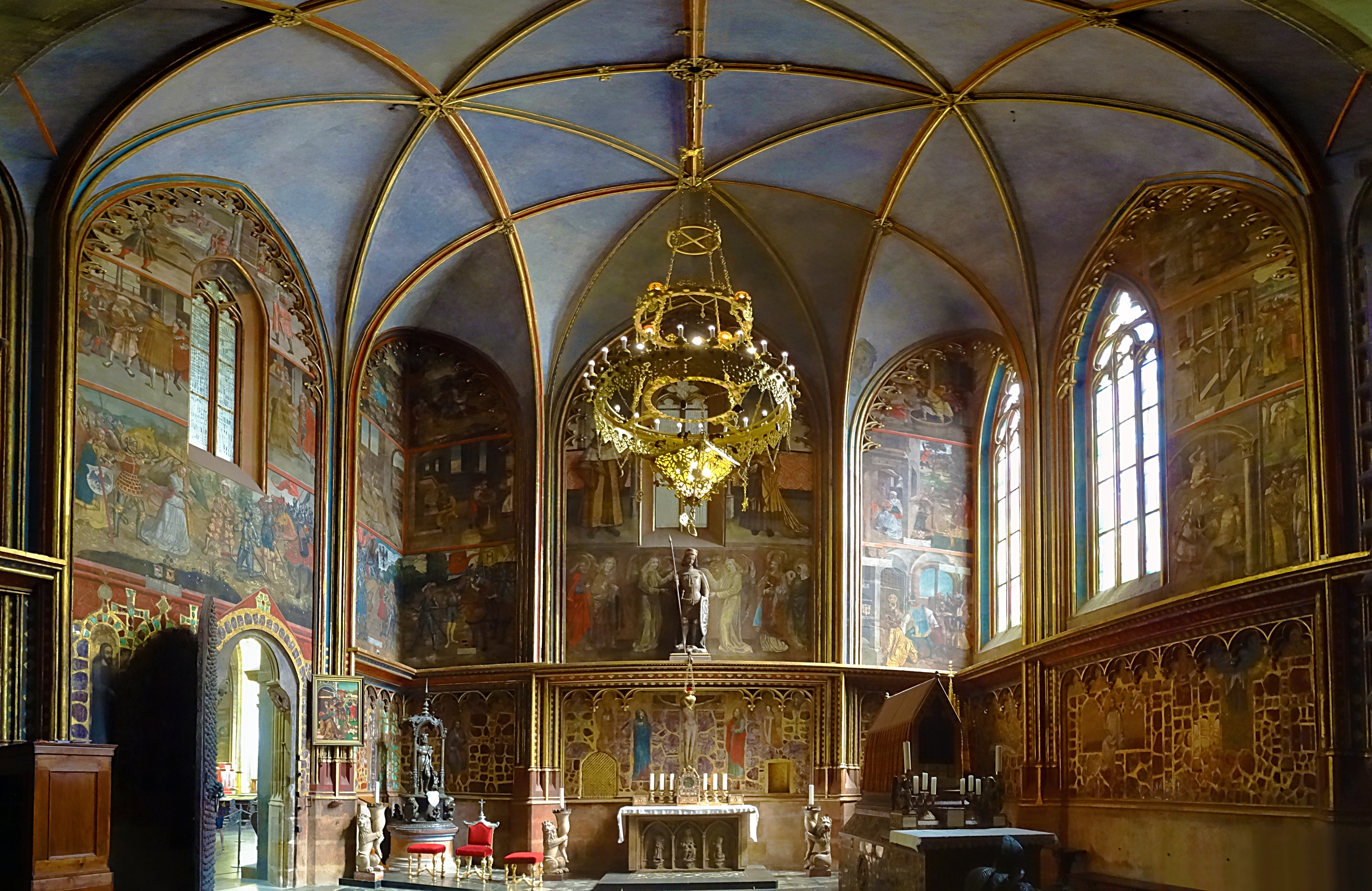
St. Wenceslaus Chapel

Perhaps the most outstanding place in the cathedral is the Chapel of St. Wenceslaus, which houses relics of the saint. Peter Parler constructed the room between 1356 (the year he took over) and 1364 with a ribbed vault. The lower portions of the walls are decorated with over 1300 semi-precious stones and paintings depicting the Passion of Christ dating from the original decoration of the chapel in 1372–1373. The upper area of the walls have paintings depicting the life of St. Wenceslaus, by the Master of the Litoměřice Altarpiece between 1506 and 1509. Above the altar, is a Gothic statue of St. Wenceslaus created by Jindřich Parler (Peter's nephew) in 1373. The chapel is not open to the public, but it can be viewed from the doorways.

A small door with seven locks, in the southwest corner of the chapel, leads to the Crown Chamber containing the Bohemian crown jewels.

==== Burials ====
Blanche of Valois (1317-1348) Princess Of France, Margravine Of Moravia (1334-1349), Queen Of The Romans (1346-1348), Queen Of Bohemia (1346-1348). daughter of Charles, Count of Valois and Mahaut of Châtillon , sister of Philip VI of France the first Valois King Of France. Also known by her birthname Marguerite Of Valois.

=== Renaissance and Baroque ===
Through most of the following centuries, the cathedral stood only half-finished. It was built to the great tower and a transept, which was closed by a provisional wall. In the place of a three-aisled nave-to-be-built, a timber-roofed construction stood, and services were held separately there from the interior of the choir. Several attempts to continue the work on the cathedral were mostly unsuccessful. In the latter half of the 15th century, king Vladislaus II commissioned the great Renaissance-Gothic architect Benedict Ried to continue the work on the cathedral, but almost as soon as the work began, it was cut short because of lack of funds. Later attempts to finish the cathedral only brought some Renaissance and Baroque elements into the Gothic building, most notably the obviously different Baroque spire of the south tower by Nikolaus Pacassi (1753 until 1775) and the great organ in the northern wing of transept.

South door and tower including spire

=== Completion in 19th and 20th century ===
The unfinished cathedral with the Golden Gate, before 1892

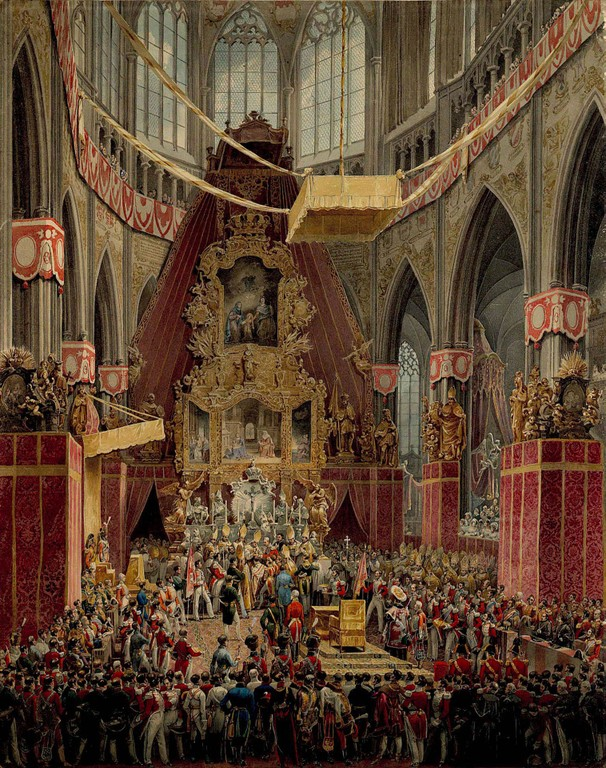
Coronation of King Ferdinand V of Bohemia in 1836

In 1844, Václav Pešina, an energetic St. Vitus canon, together with Neo-Gothic architect Josef Kranner presented a program for renovation and completion of the great cathedral at the gathering of German architects in Prague. The same year a society under the full name "Union for Completion of the Cathedral of St. Vitus in Prague" was formed, whose aim was to repair, complete and rid the structure of everything mutilated and stylistically inimical. Josef Kranner headed the work from 1861 to 1866 which consisted mostly of repairs, removing Baroque decorations deemed unnecessary and restoring the interior. In 1870 workers finally laid the foundations of the new nave, and in 1873, after Kranner's death, architect Josef Mocker assumed control of the reconstruction. He designed the west façade in a typical classic Gothic manner with two towers, and the same design was adopted, after his death, by the third and final architect of restoration, Kamil Hilbert.

In the 1920s the sculptor Vojtěch Sucharda worked on the façade, and the famous Czech Art Nouveau painter Alfons Mucha decorated the new windows in the north part of nave. Frantisek Kysela designed the rose window from 1925 to 1927, which depicts scenes from the Biblical story of creation. By the time of St. Wenceslaus jubilee in 1929, the St. Vitus cathedral was finally finished, nearly 600 years after it was begun. Despite the fact that the entire western half of the cathedral is a Neo-Gothic addition, much of the design and elements developed by Peter Parler were used in the restoration, giving the cathedral as a whole a harmonious, unified look.

=== Recent history ===
In 1997, on the 1000th anniversary of the death of Saint Adalbert, the patrocinium (dedication) of the church was re-dedicated to Saint Wenceslaus and Saint Adalbert. The previous Romanesque basilica had this triple patrocinium to the main Bohemian patrons since 1038 when relics of Saint Adalbert were placed here. The skull of Saint Adalbert is kept at the Hilbert Treasury

In 1954, a government decree entrusted the whole Prague Castle into ownership of "all Czechoslovak people" and into administration of the President's Office. Beginning in 1992, after the Velvet Revolution the church filed several petitions requesting a determination on the true owner of the structure. After 14 years, in June 2006, the City Court in Prague decided that the 1954 decree did not change the ownership of the cathedral and the owner is the Metropolitan Chapter at Saint Vitus. In September 2006, the President's Office ceded the administration to the Metropolitan Chapter. However, in February 2007, the Supreme Court of the Czech Republic reversed the decision of the City Court and returned the case to the common court. In September 2007, the District Court of Prague 7 decided that the cathedral is owned by the Czech Republic, this decision was confirmed by the City Court in Prague and the Constitutional Court rejected the appeal of the Metropolitan Chapter, however noted that the chapter unquestionably owns the interior furnishings of the cathedral. The Metropolitan Chapter considered continuing the case in the European Court for Human Rights however in May 2010, the new Prague Archbishop Dominik Duka and the state president Václav Klaus together declared that they did not wish to continue with court conflicts. They constituted that the seven persons who are traditionally holders of the keys of the Saint Wenceslaus Chamber with the Bohemian Crown Jewels become also a board to coordinate and organize administration and use of the cathedral. However, controversy about ownership of some related canonry houses continues.

In July 2012, the Chamber of Deputies passed a bill to compensate the churches for property seized by the communist government. The Senate approved the bill in November 2012 and the government implemented it the following June after clearing legal challenges.

== Organ ==
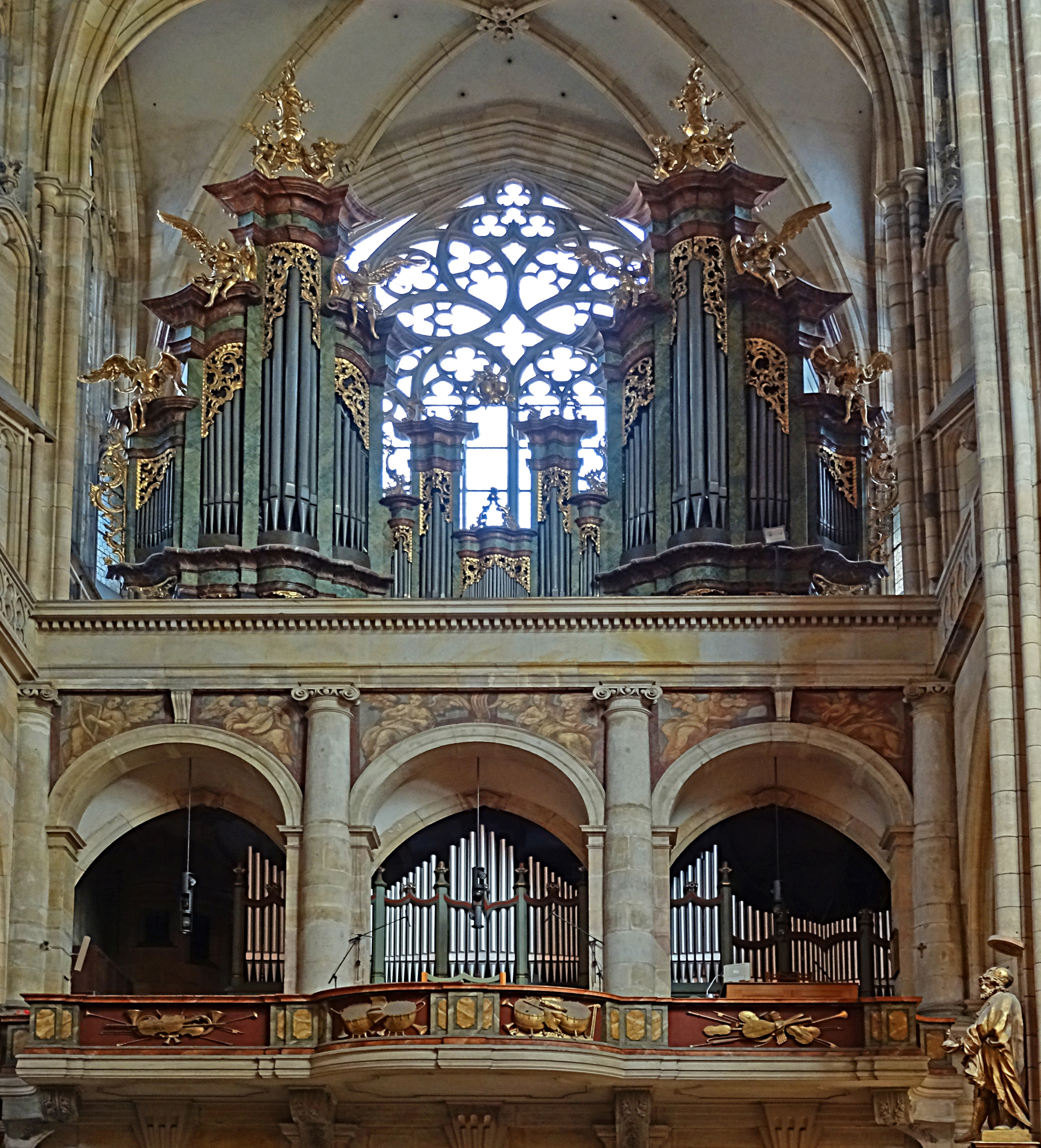
Organ at the northern transept

The St. Vitus Cathedral has two organ casings. The upper façade belonged to a baroque organ, which was built in 1765 by Anton Gartner. It had 40 stops on 3 manuals and pedals. This case is purely decorative. The associated work was transported around 1909 and was lost.

The lower neoclassical casing contains today's main organ. It was built by Josef Melzel in the years 1929–31. A general overhaul was carried out by the organ builder Brachtl a Kánský (1999–2001). The rather modest instrument in relation to the large church space has 58 stops on 3 manuals and pedals, 4,475 pipes in total. The action is purely pneumatic. With a large number of basic pipes (flutes and principals) and little reeds (trumpets), the instrument has a rather gentle tone – a typical feature of post-Romantic organs.

On 15 June 2026, the new organ installation was completed. The more suitable instrument in relation to the large church space has 122 stops on 4 manuals and pedals, 5,755 pipes in total, costing approximately CZK 160 million. It was built by master organist Gerhard Grenzing, and the 180 crystal ornaments were designed by Škoda Design designer Peter Olah.

== Influence ==
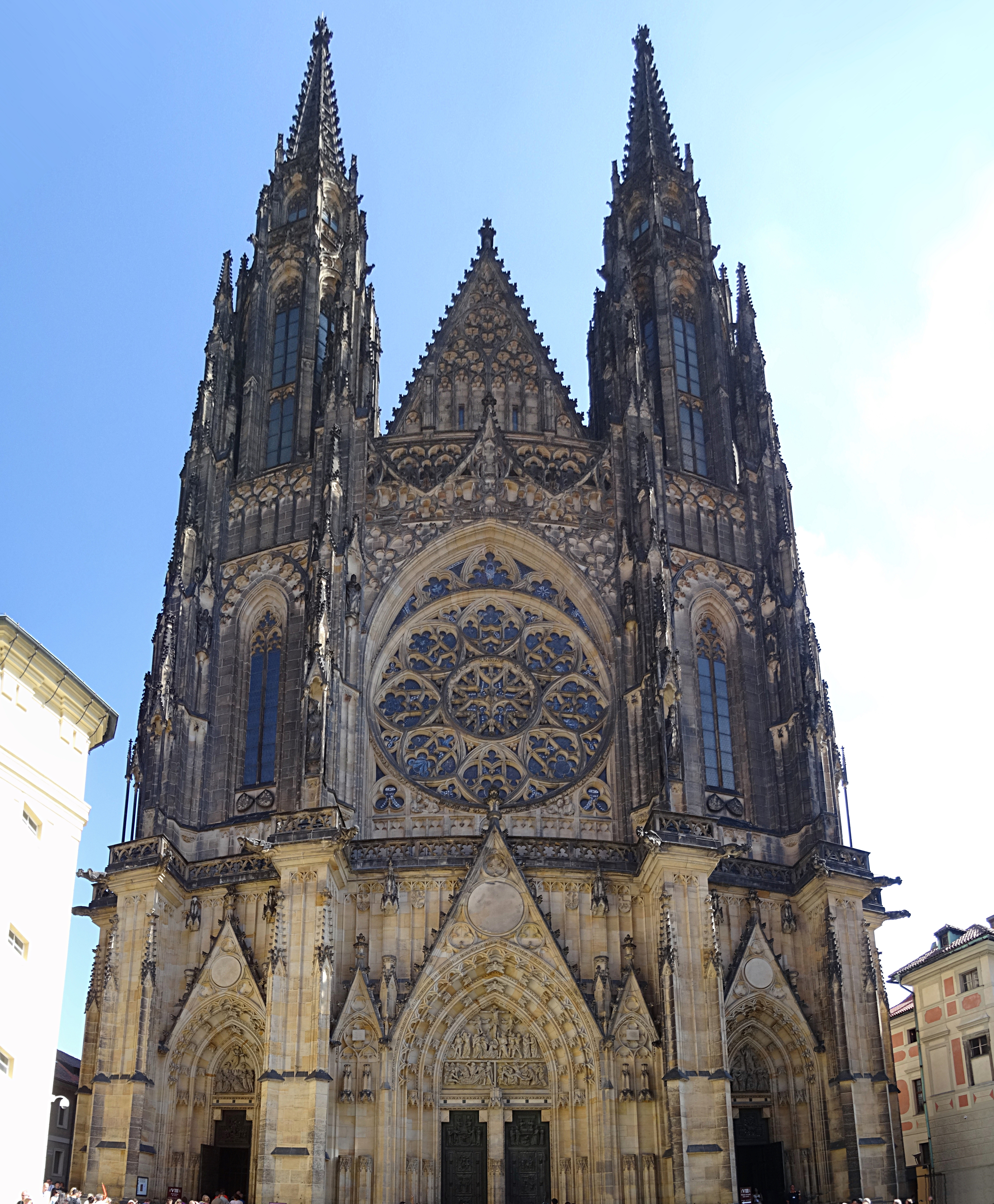
West view and main portal

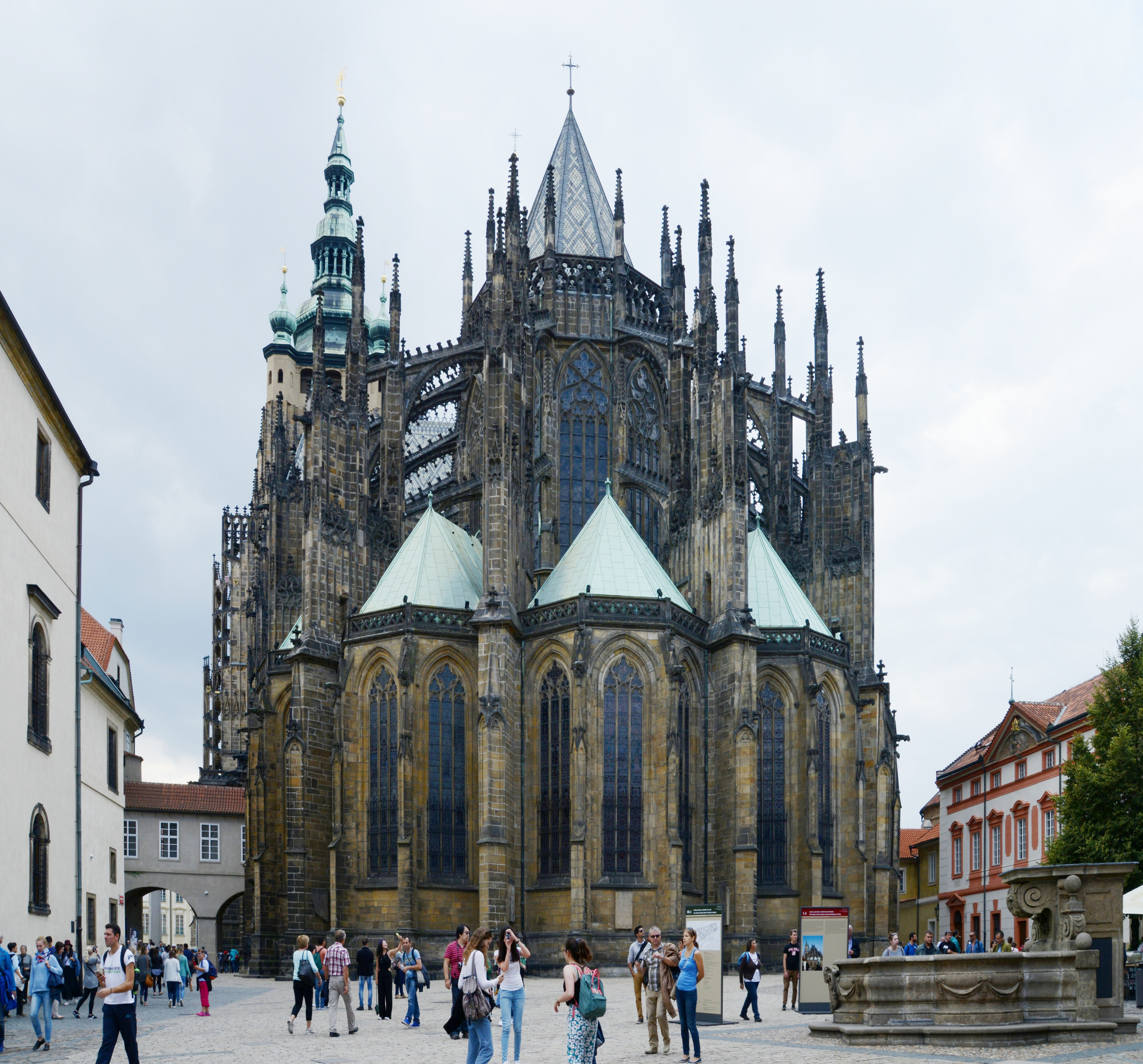
The eastern façade

The Cathedral of St. Vitus had a tremendous influence on the development of Late Gothic style characteristic for Central Europe. Members of the Parler workshop, and indeed, the Parler family (both of which were established at the building site of St. Vitus) designed numerous churches and buildings across Central Europe. More notable examples include Stephansdom cathedral in Vienna, Strasbourg Cathedral, Church of St. Marko in Zagreb and the Church of St. Barbara in Kutná Hora, also in Czech Republic. Regional Gothic styles of Slovenia, northern Croatia, Austria, Czech Republic, and southern Germany were all heavily influenced by Parler's design.

Of particular interest are Parler's net vaults. The Late Gothic of Central Europe is characterised by ornate and extraordinary vaulting, a practice which was started by Parler's development of his own vaulting system for the choir of St. Vitus Cathedral. Another regional Gothic style also displays amazing ingenuity and ornamentation in the design of vaults, the Perpendicular Style of English Gothic. A question remains of what was influenced by what. Some British art and architecture historians suspected that Peter Parler might have travelled to England at some point in his life, studying the great English Gothic cathedrals, which then inspired his work on St. Vitus. However, taking into account that the Perpendicular style and the use of truly extravagant vaults in English Gothic began at the very end of 14th century, it is also quite possible that it was St. Vitus Cathedral of Prague that influenced the development of English Gothic.

== Gallery ==
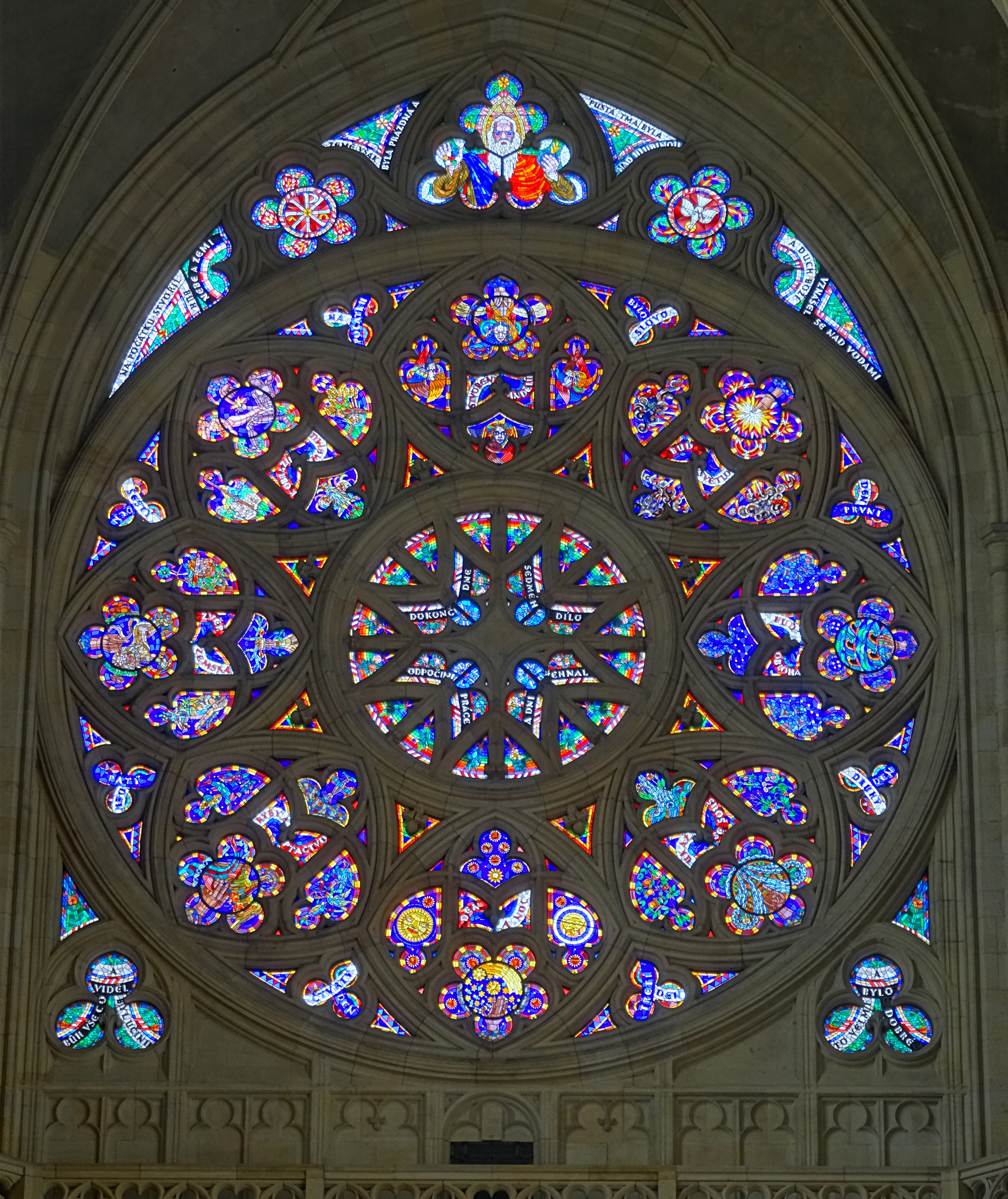
Window rosette "Creation of the World"

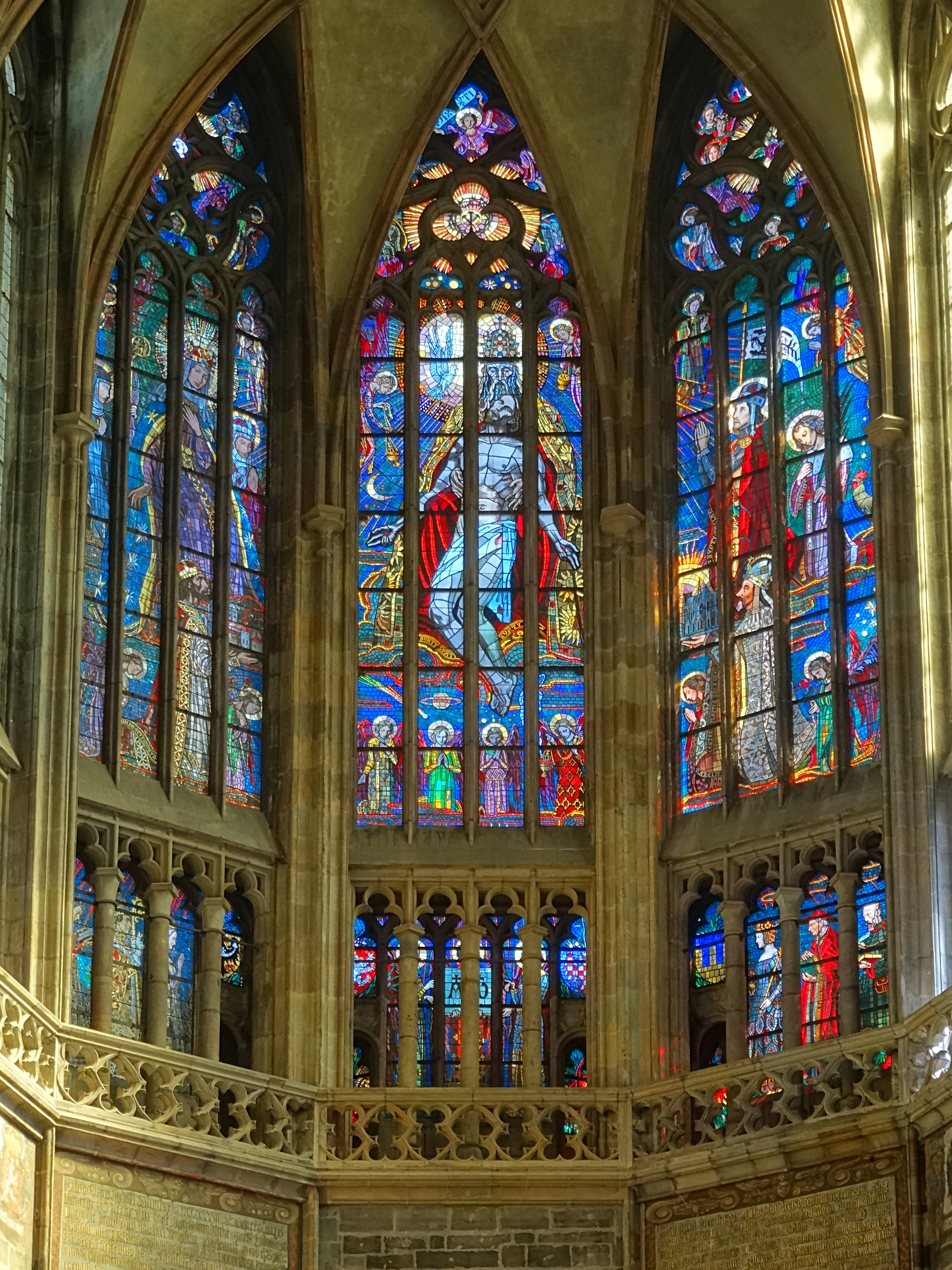
Choir window

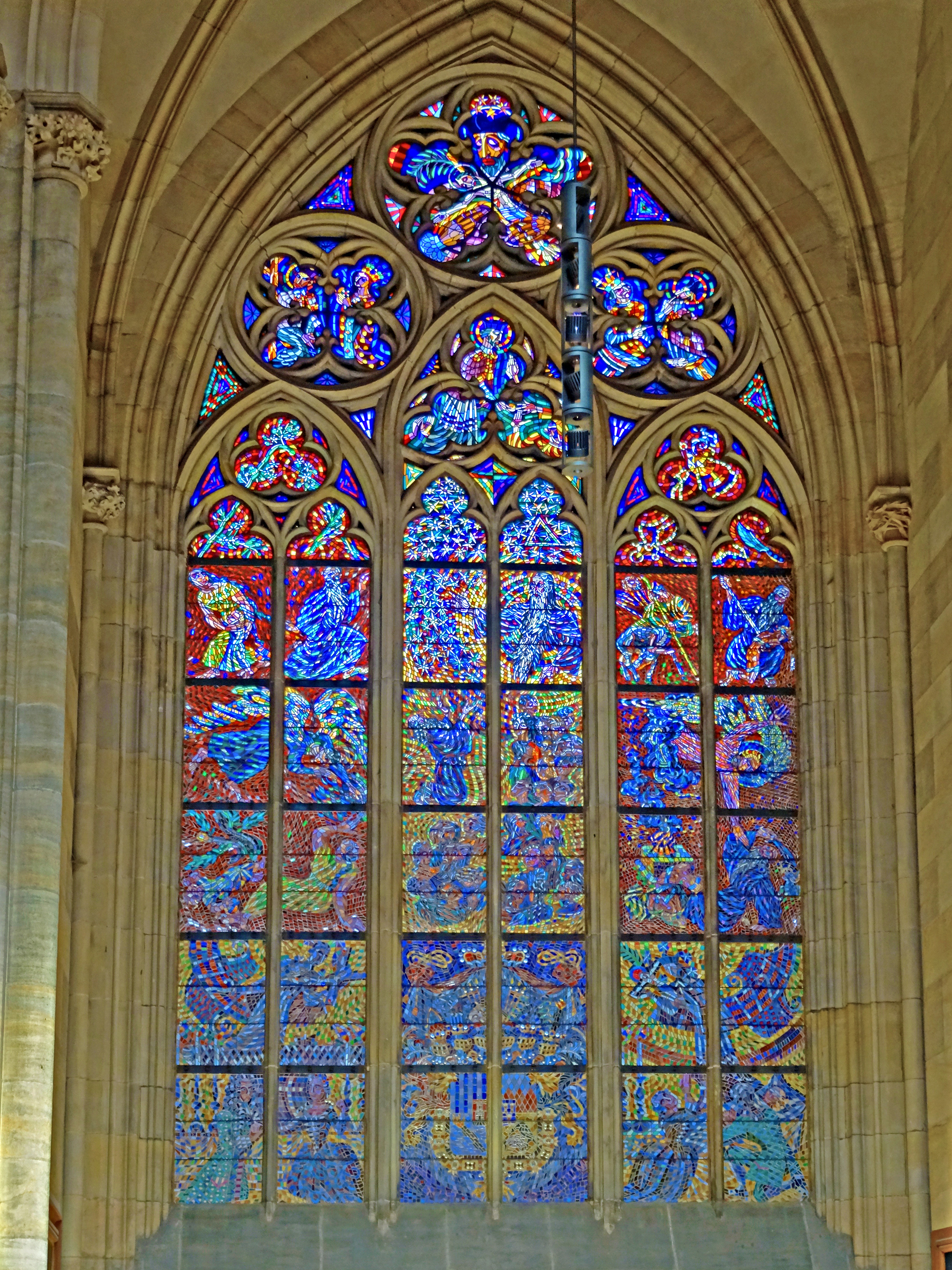
Schwarzenberg chapel

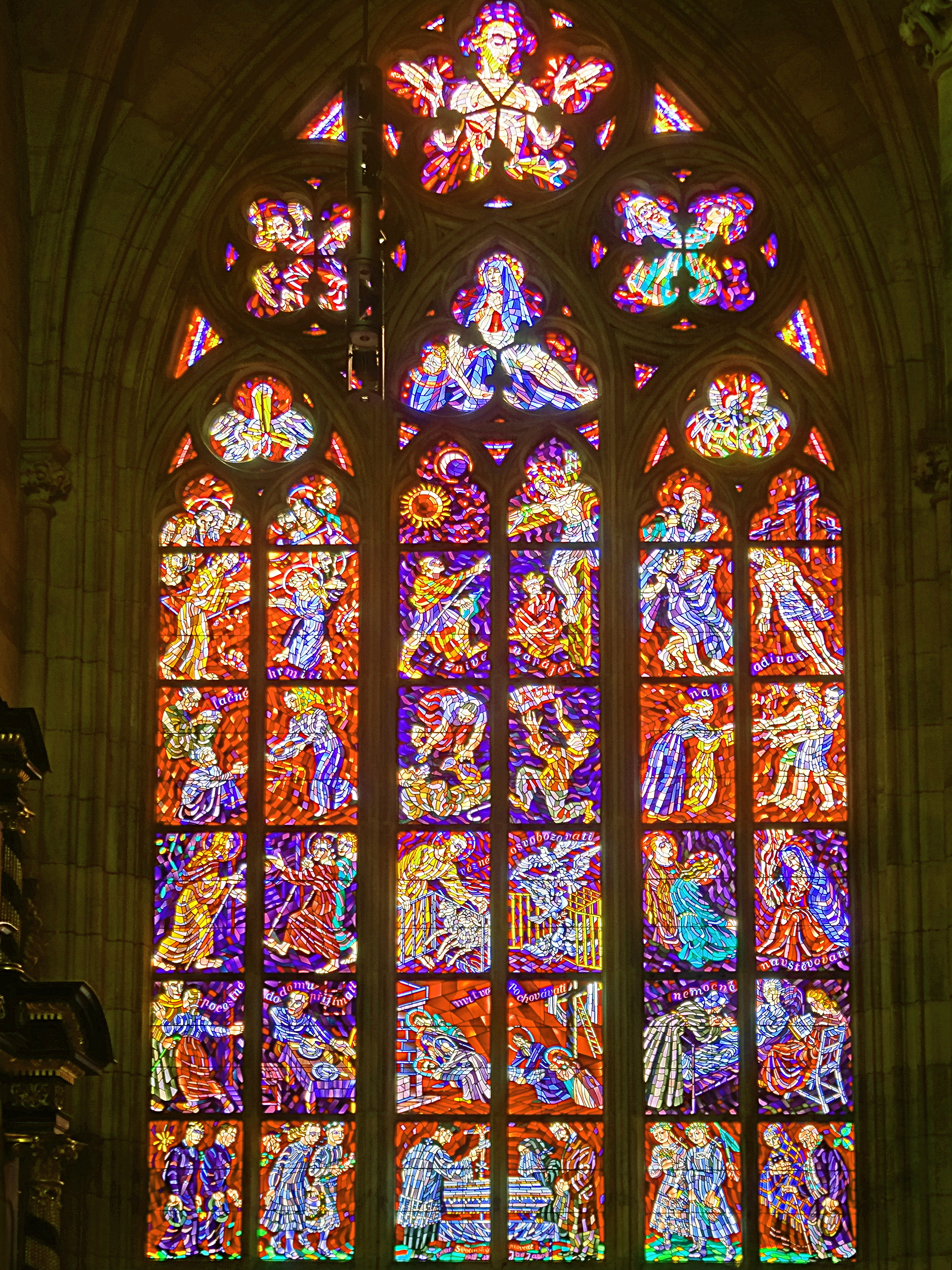
Chapel of the Holy Sepulchre

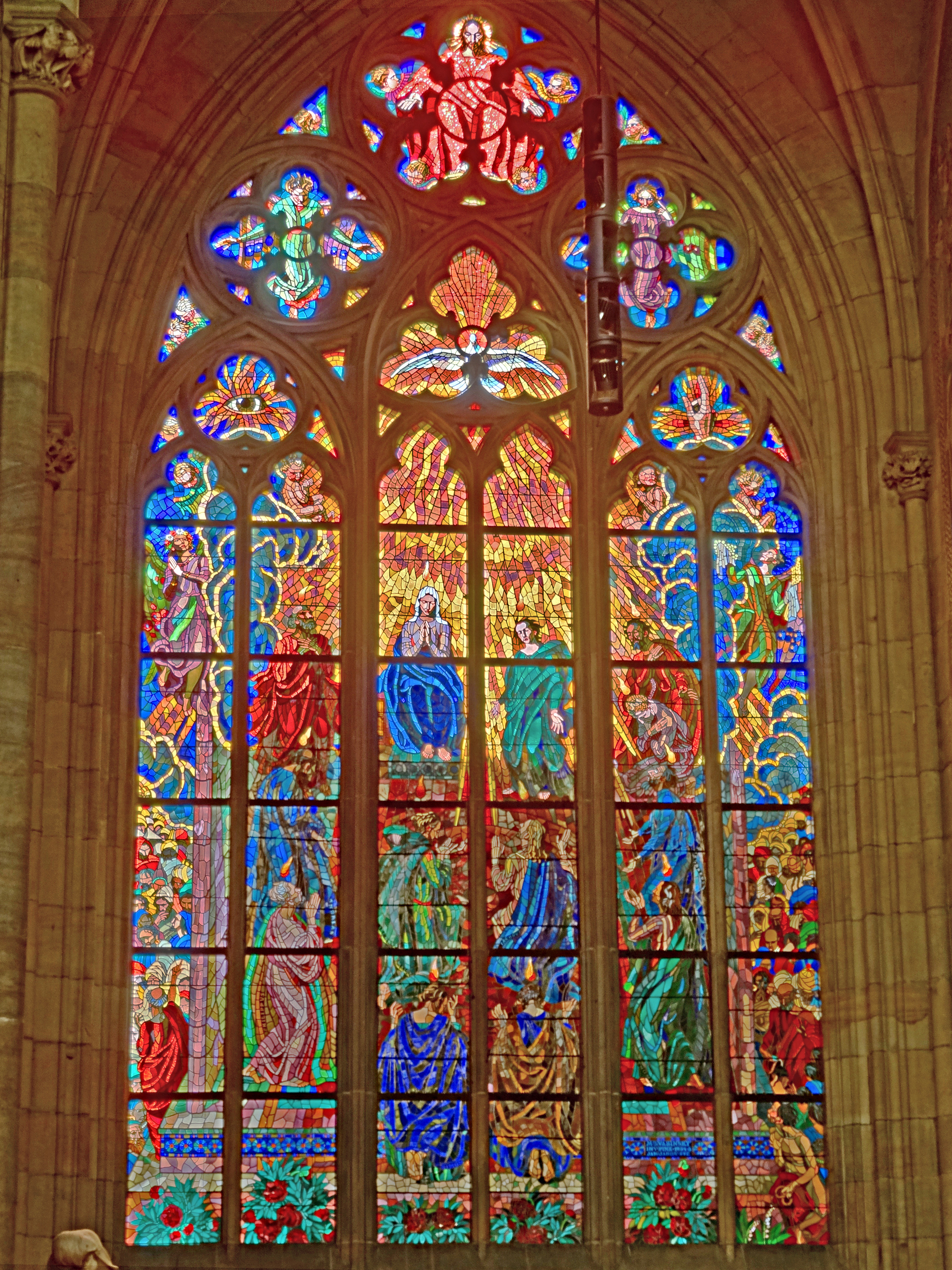
Chapel of St. Ludmila

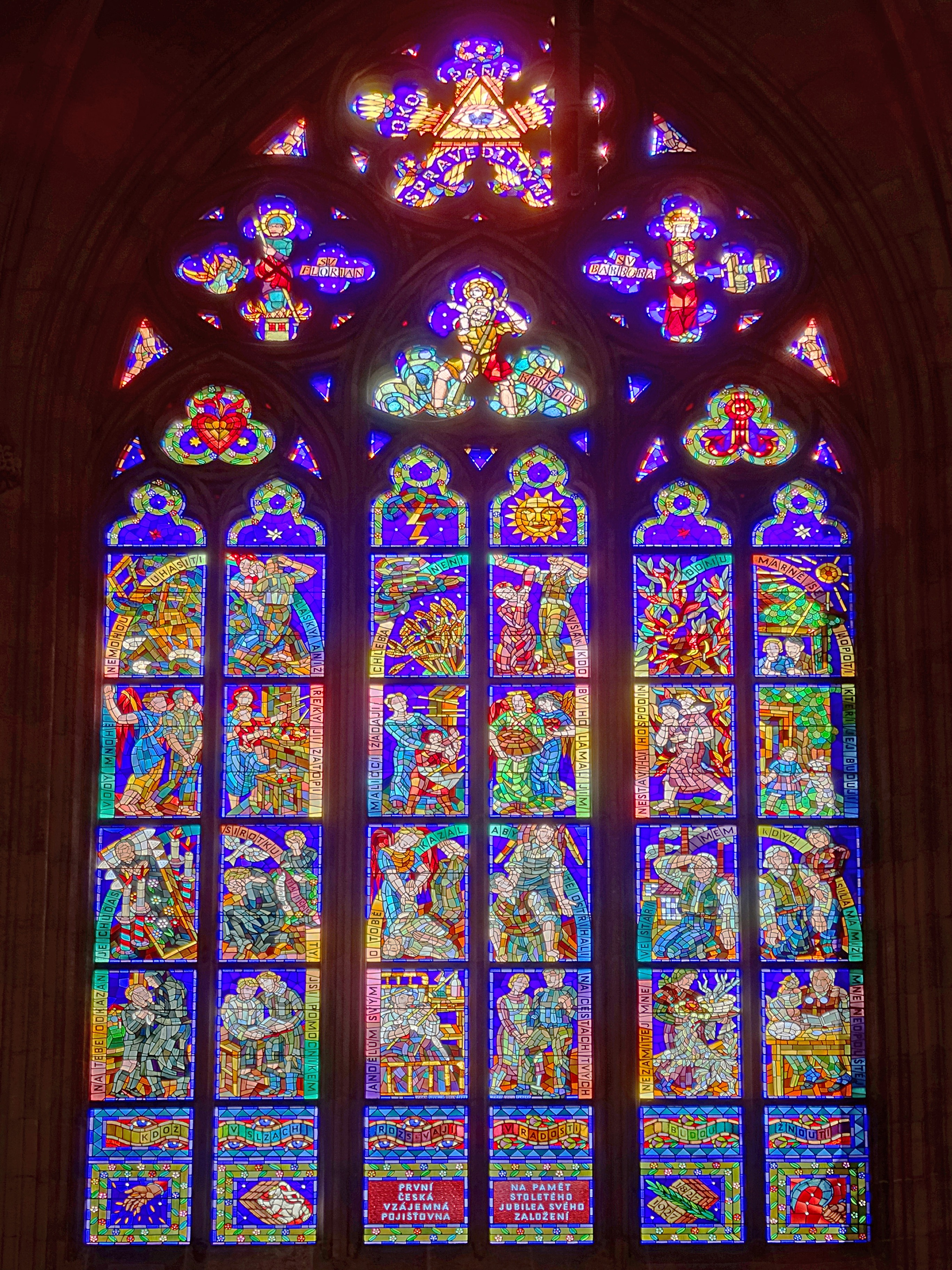
Thun chapel

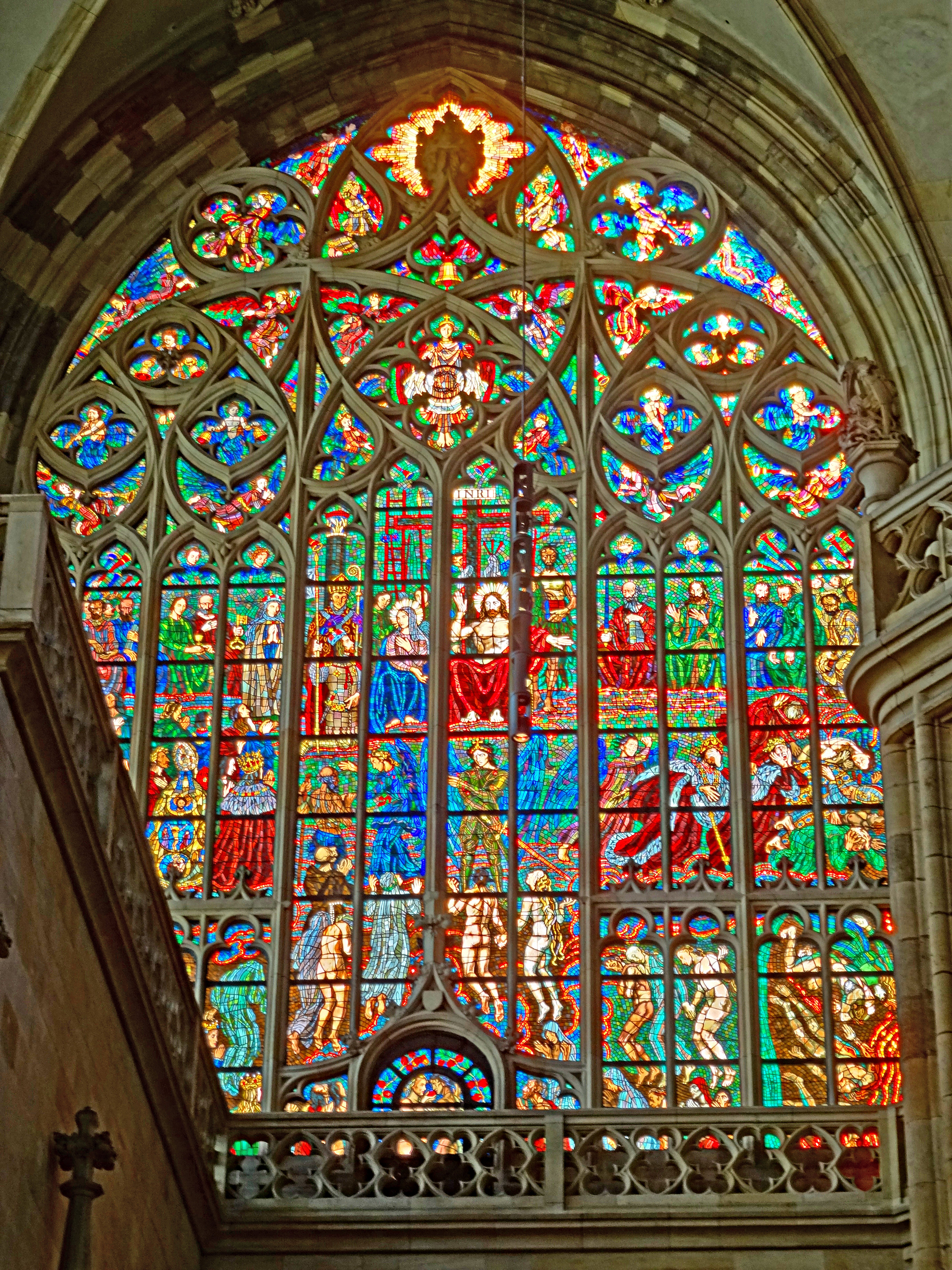
Window above the Golden Gate

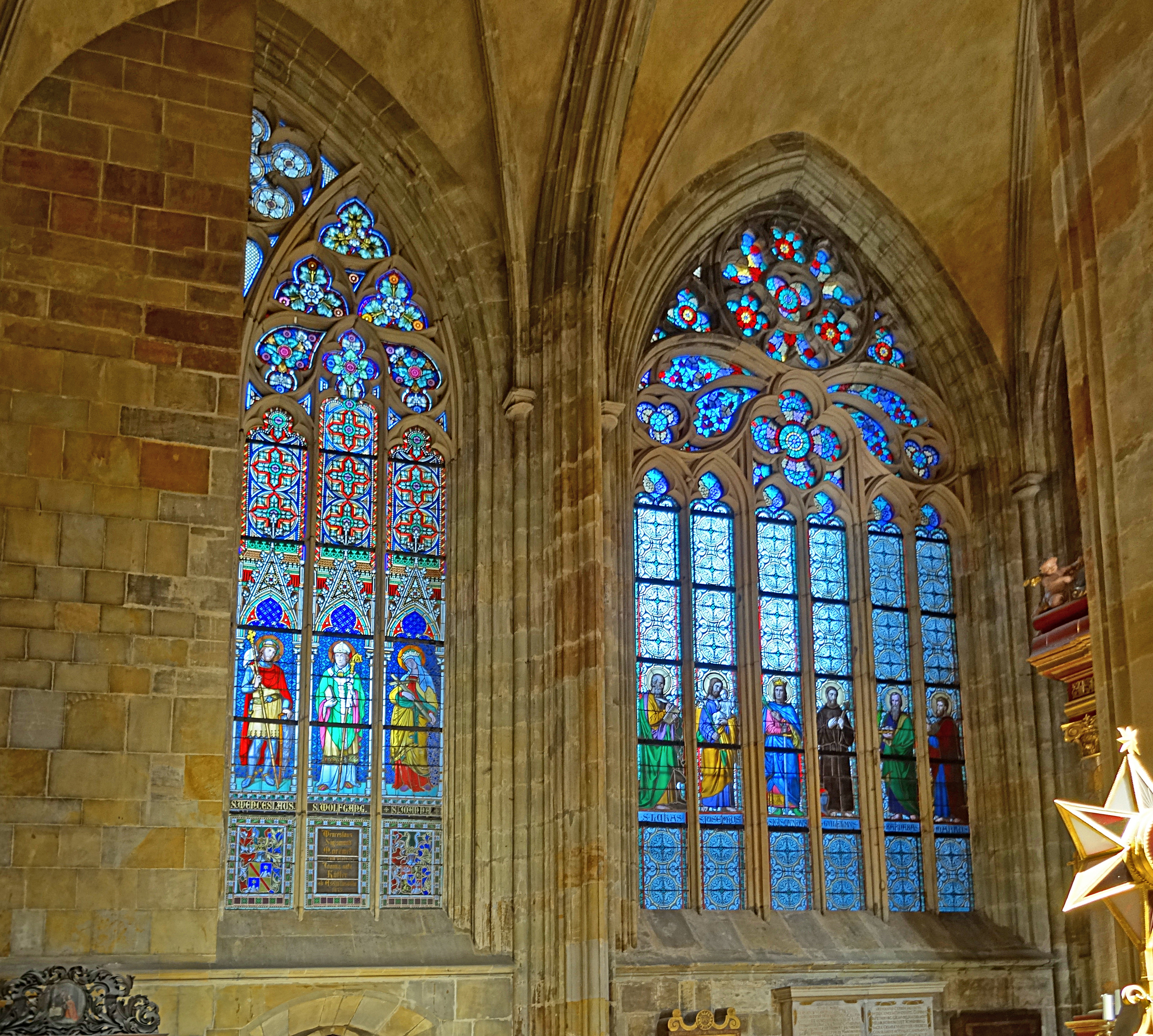
St. Sigismund Chapel

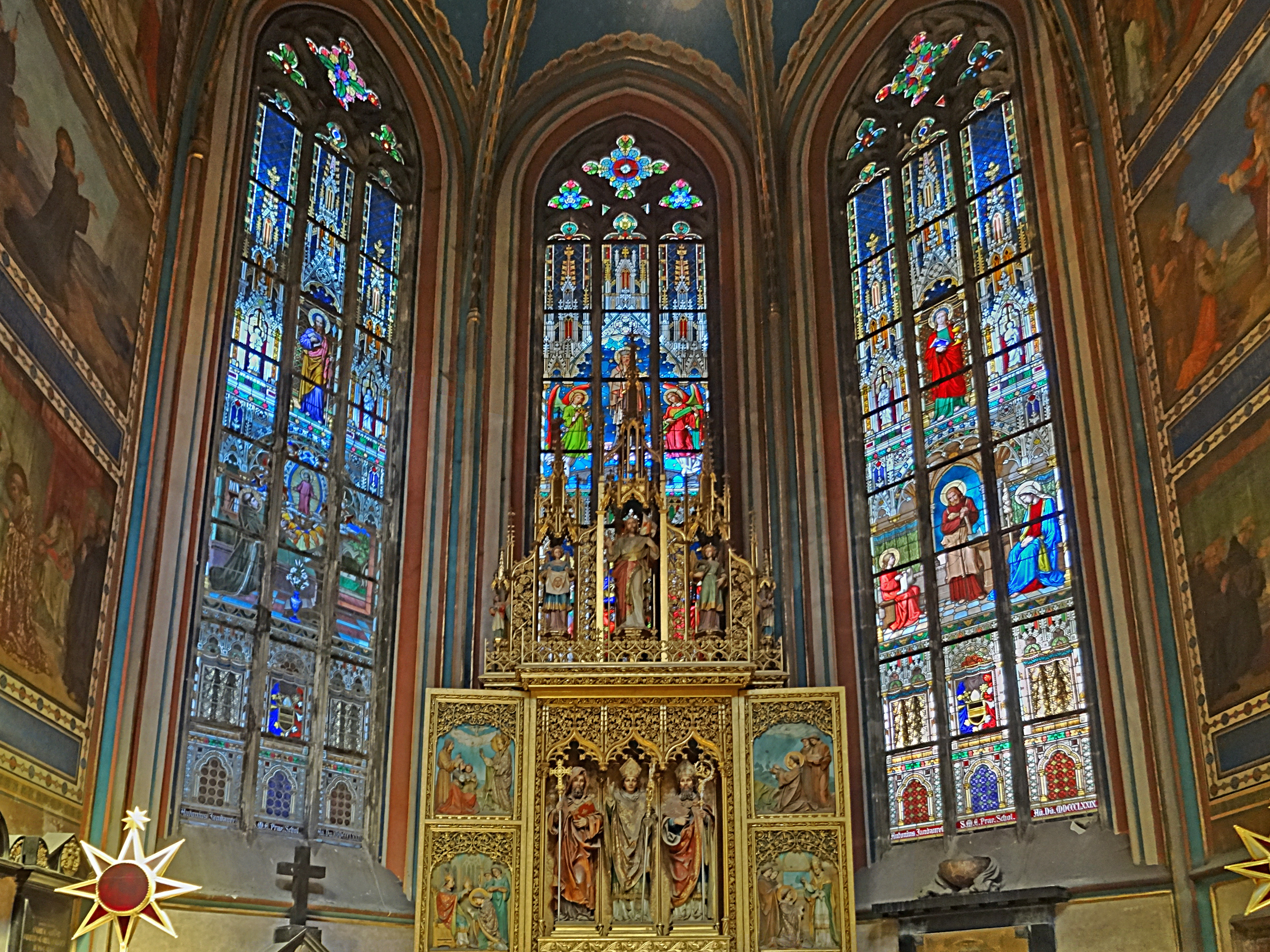
Old Archiepiscopal Chapel

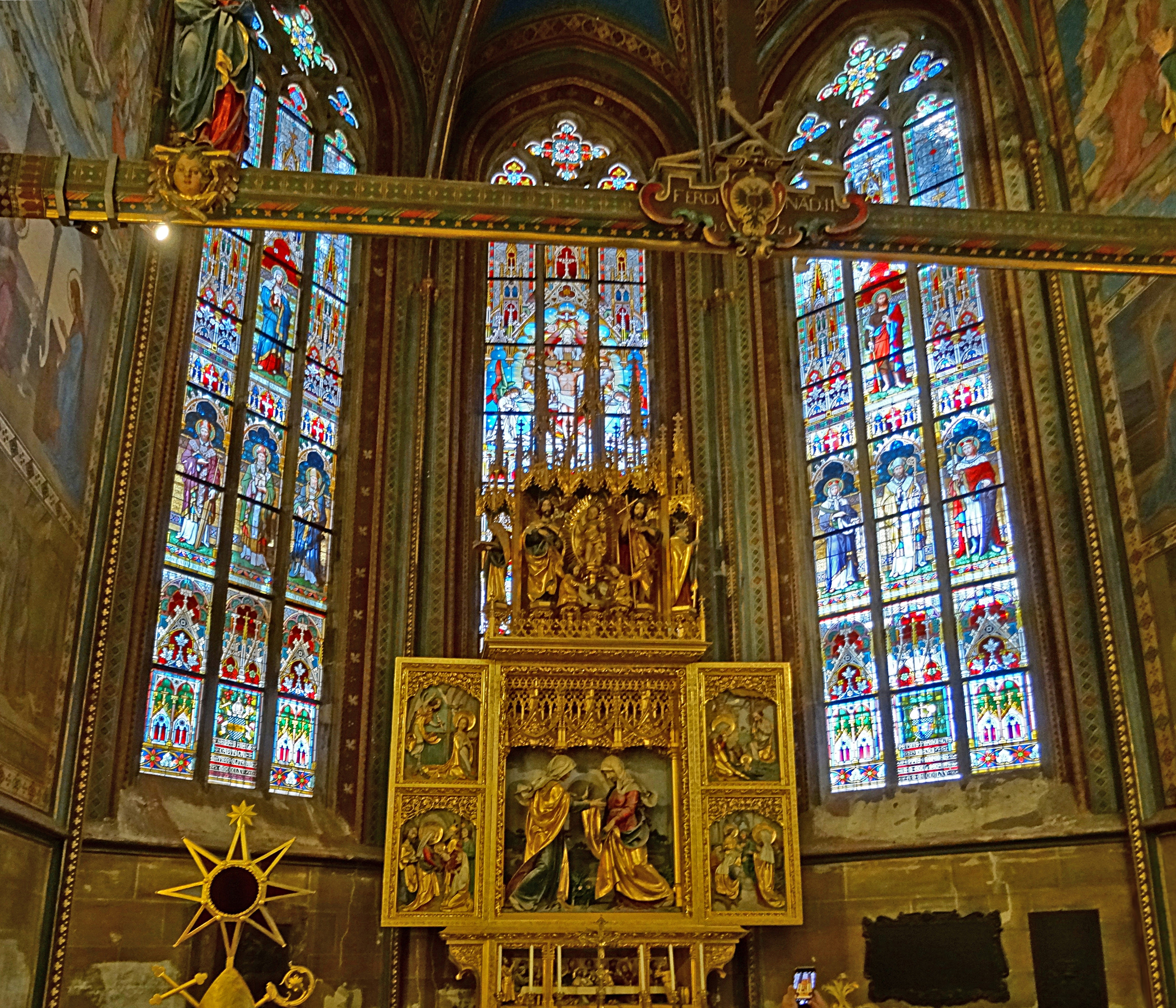
Chapel of the Virgin Mary

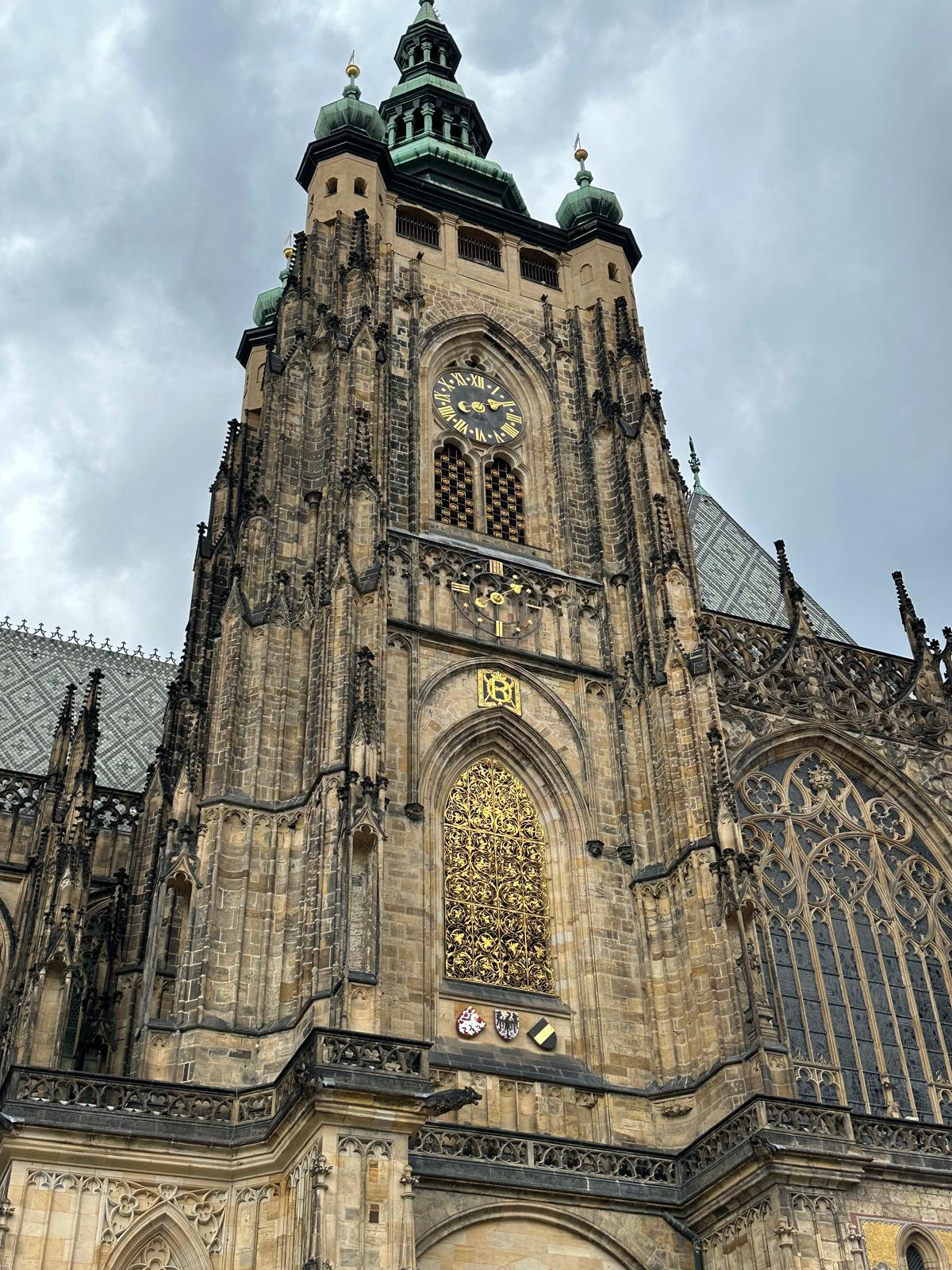
Facade of St. Vitus Cathedral

== See also ==
- List of Gothic cathedrals in Europe
- Czech Gothic architecture
- St. George's Basilica, Prague
- Treasury of St. Vitus Cathedral
- Late medieval domes
- 16th-century Western domes
