= St. George's Convent =

- Klášter svatého Jiří
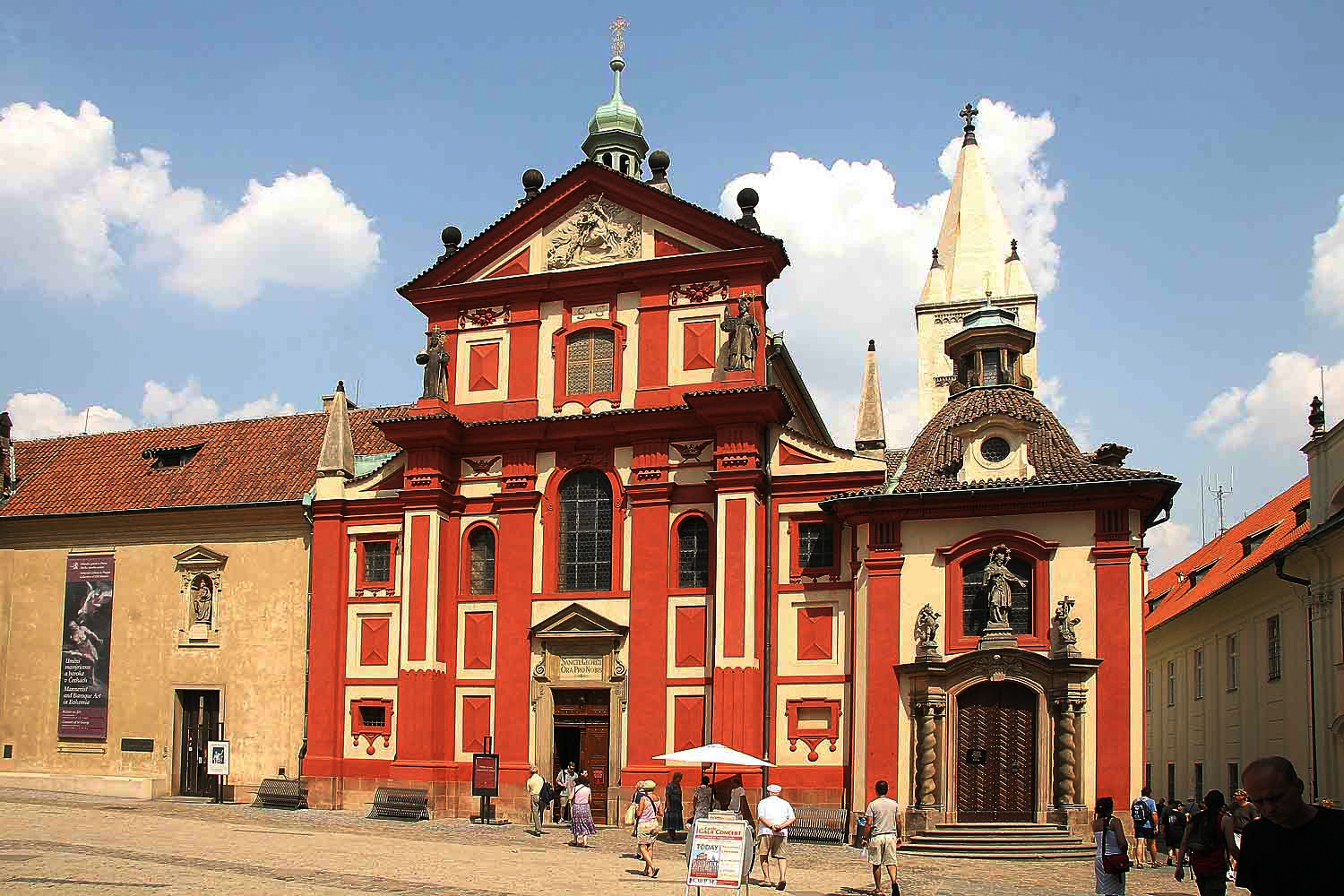
- Interactive map of the St. George's Convent area

General information
- Location: Prague Castle, Hradčany, Prague 1, 119 08, Czech Republic
- Coordinates: 50°05′28″N 14°24′09″E
- Completed: 973

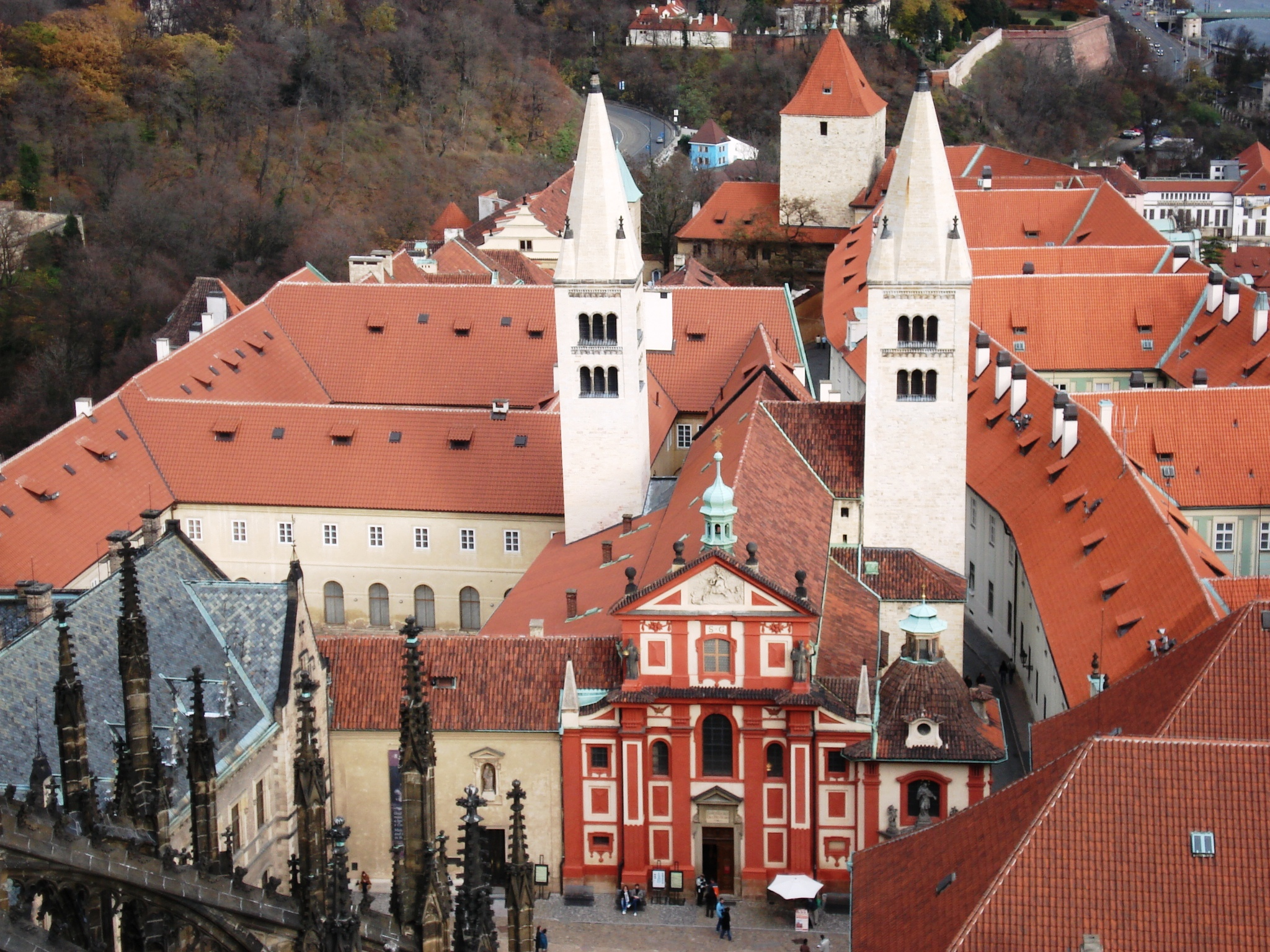
Overview of St. George's Convent

St. George's Convent (Czech: klášter svatého Jiří) was a community of Benedictine nuns located in Prague Castle in Bohemia (now the Czech Republic) between 973 and 1782.

Founded in 973, the abbey was next to the seat of ecclesiastical and state power in Bohemia and occasionally the entire Holy Roman Empire, and played an important historical role. During the Middle Ages, the convent was one of the richest in the Crown of Bohemia. Around 1400, about 50 nuns (including those still before their profession) lived in the abbey.

Although no longer active, the nunnery's building and the attached Basilica dedicated to Saint George still exist. The abbey building housed the Czech National Gallery's collection of 19th-century Bohemian art for a long time. Currently, it is empty and is waiting for a renovation.

The abbess of this nunnery had the unusual privilege of crowning the Queen consort of Bohemia, inherited in 1782 by the Princess-Abbess of the Theresian Institution of Noble Ladies.
