= Środa Śląska =

Town in Lower Silesian Voivodeship, Poland

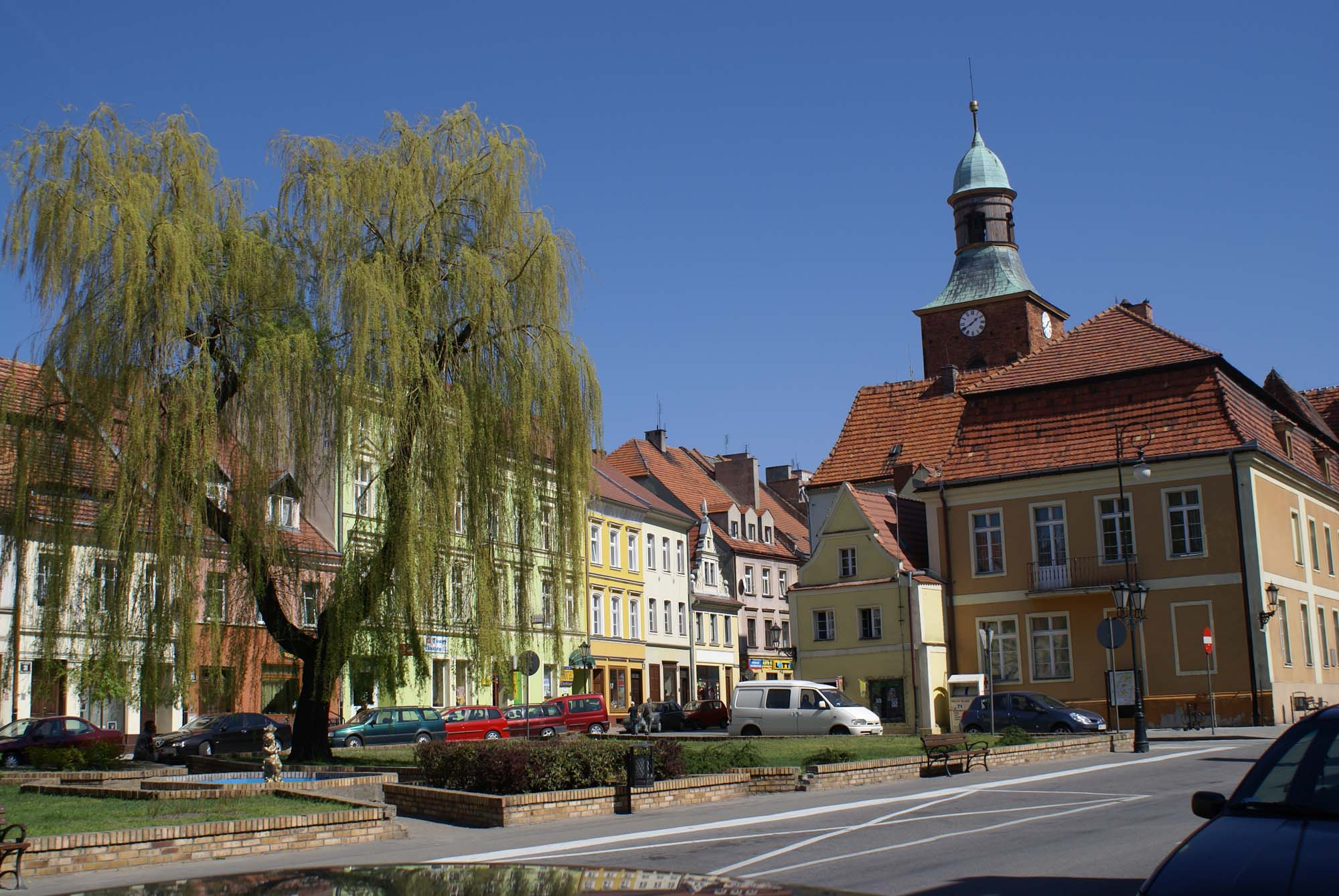
- Historical town hall at the Freedom Square (Plac Wolności)

- Flag Coat of arms

- Location within Poland
- Coordinates: 51°9′N 16°35′E
- Country: Poland
- Voivodeship: Lower Silesian
- County: Środa
- Gmina: Środa Śląska

Government
  - Mayor: Elżbieta Czarnota

Area
  - Total: 14.94 km^{2} (5.77 sq mi)
- Elevation: 130 m (430 ft)

Population (2019-06-30)
  - Total: 9,516
  - Density: 636.9/km^{2} (1,650/sq mi)
- Time zone: UTC+1 (CET)
  - Summer (DST): UTC+2 (CEST)
- Postal code: 55-300
- Area code: +48 71
- Car plates: DSR
- Website: https://en.srodaslaska.pl

Środa Śląska (/ˈʃroʊdə ˈʃlɒ̃skə/, Polish: [ˈɕrɔda ˈɕlɔ̃ska]; German: Neumarkt in Schlesien) is a town in the Lower Silesian Voivodeship, in south-western Poland. It is the seat of Środa County, and of the smaller administrative district (gmina) called Gmina Środa Śląska. The town lies approximately 32 km (20 mi) west of the regional capital Wrocław, on the Średzka Woda creek. As of 2019, the town has a population of 9,516. It is part of the Wrocław metropolitan area.

The town emerged from a medieval Polish trade settlement in the 13th century, and its town rights, granted by Henry the Bearded, became a model for municipal rights of more than 100 towns in Poland. The town has been an important craft and trade center since and has a number of heritage structures, including in Romanesque, Gothic and Baroque styles, and is the site of the discovery of the medieval Środa Treasure.

== History ==
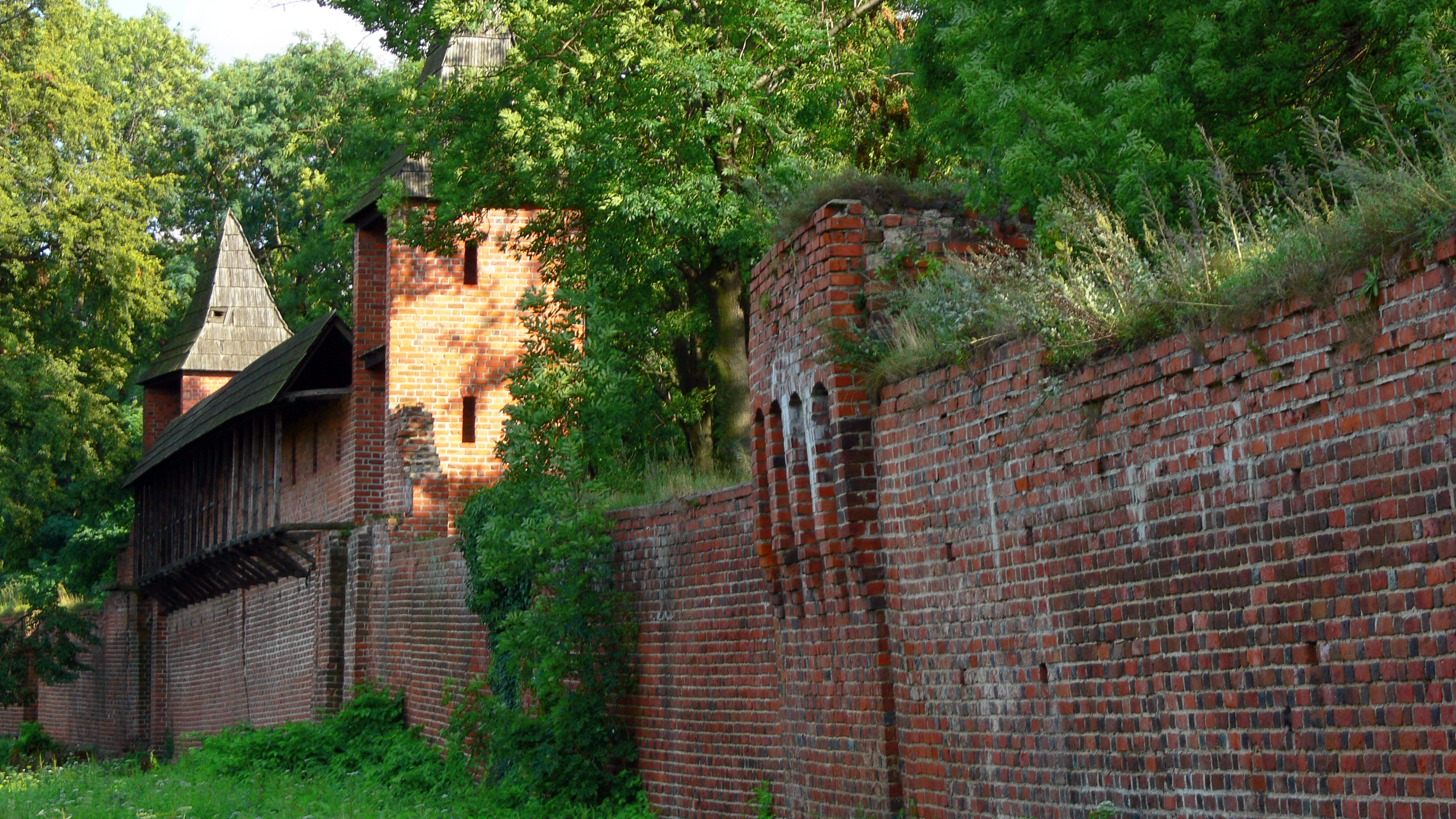
Medieval town walls

The transformation of Środa Śląska from a small commercial settlement into a center of urban character was carried out by Polish Duke Henry the Bearded (1202–1238), whose idea was to enhance the economic and political significance of the Silesia region as a means to re-unify the Polish Kingdom. He vested it with town rights before 1233. At around 1235, he granted it a special law, based on the Magdeburg law, but adapted to the local conditions (Środa law). It was a model on which many other Polish towns were later founded (including Opole, Kalisz, Wieliczka, Radom). Środa Śląska is situated in the central part of the Lower Silesia region at the main transport routes joining the east and west of Europe. The name Środa means "Wednesday", as that was the day on which the weekly market took place. The town was fortified with ramparts and a moat. The St. Andrew's Church was most likely built before Środa was granted town rights, although the oldest known mention dates back to 1233, whereas the castle was first mentioned in 1266, however, it also may have been built much earlier. It was a residence of the local dukes from the Piast dynasty and the seat of the Środa castellany. Between 1220 and 1234 a hospital was established either by Duke Henry the Bearded or Bishop of Wrocław Wawrzyniec, and by the late 13th century, there was also a parish school (at St. Andrew's Church). Possibly in 1253, the Franciscans arrived and established the town's first monastery, although the oldest known mention comes from 1318. A second hospital was founded in the late 14th century.

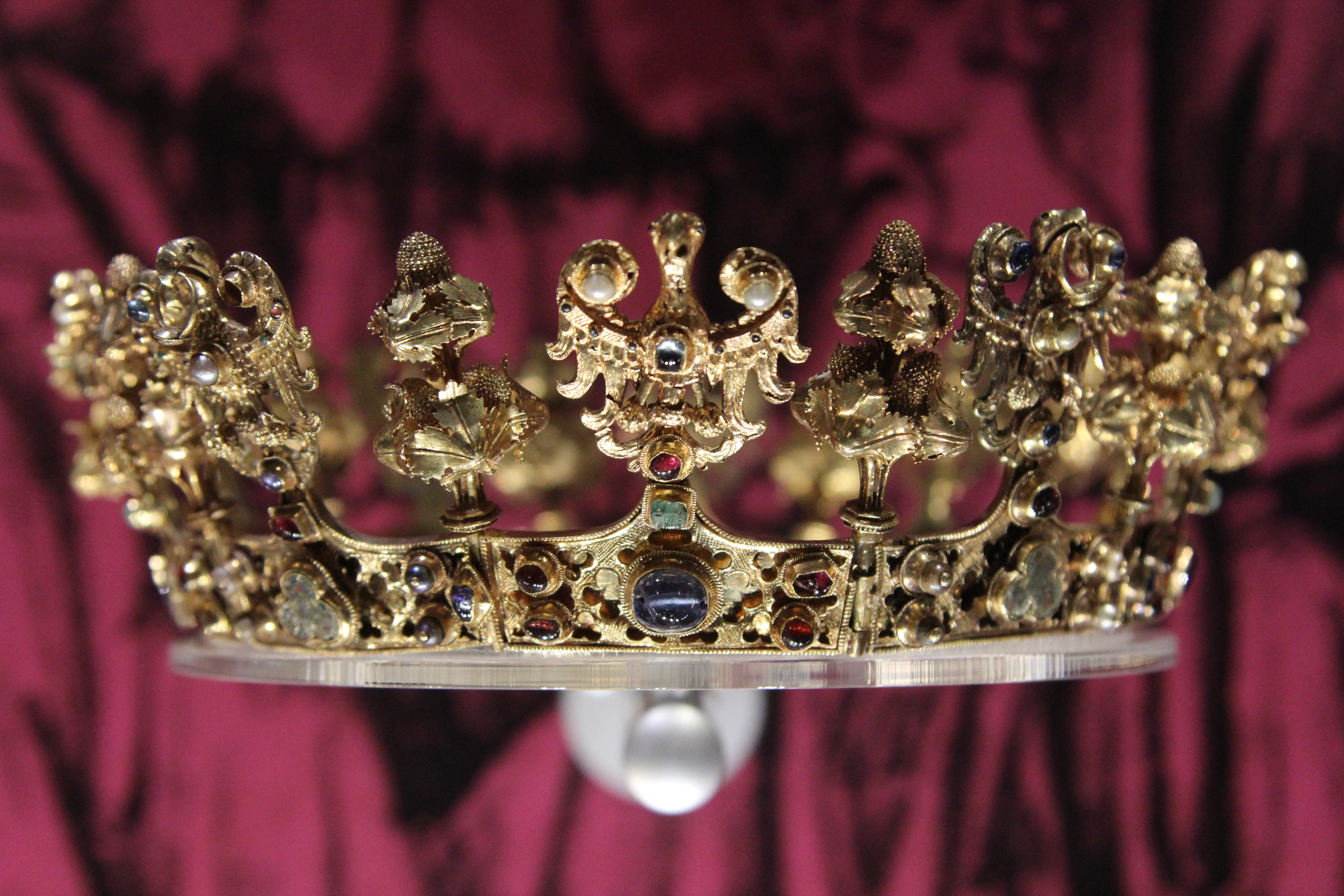
Golden crown of Queen Blanche from the Środa Treasure (half of the 14th c.)

In the 13th century the town was a regional center of salt trade. A Merchants' House was established in 1283, a slaughterhouse operated in the town by 1307, and after 1348 merchant shops were built. Crafts and trade, including weaving, developed in the town. Since the 15th century, vines were grown, as a result of which winemaking as well as brewing developed.

In 1428–31 the town was devastated by the Hussites (especially devastating was the attack in 1428 when Hussites robbed the town and burnt down the monastery and church of Franciscan order). In 1526, the town, together with whole Crown of Bohemia, passed under the rule of Habsburgs and became part of the Habsburg monarchy. In the 16th century it was one of the regional centers of Anabaptism. The town was damaged in the Thirty Years' War. One of two main routes connecting Warsaw and Dresden ran through the town in the 18th century and Kings Augustus II the Strong and Augustus III of Poland often traveled that route. In 1740, the Prussian soldiers seized the town and after the end of Silesian Wars (1740–1748) it was with most of Silesia incorporated into the Prussian Kingdom. In 1806 it was sacked by French troops, and in 1813 by German soldiers. Together with the rest of Prussia, the town became a part of unified Germany in 1871.

During World War II the Germans established there two forced labour subcamps of the Stalag VIII-A prisoner-of-war camp. In January 1945, a death march of prisoners of a subcamp of the Gross-Rosen concentration camp from Brzeg Dolny reached the town, and 93 sick prisoners, including 56 Poles, were massacred by the Volkssturm. Ernst Dickmann, who ordered the massacre, was sentenced to death after the war in December 1945 and executed. On 9 February 1945, the German troops withdrew from the town.

The town then became again part of Poland, although with a Soviet-installed communist regime, which stayed in power until the 1989. A time of complete insecurity began for the townspeople. On June 26, 1945, Polish militia forced all people out of their homes for deportation to Germany. However, the expulsion march ended in nearby Chojnów and the people returned to their homes. Each morning at 7, men and women had to show up for work and war white armbands. Eventually, all locals were evicted in mid-1946, in accordance with the Potsdam Agreement. In 1946, the adjective Śląska was added to the name after the region of Silesia within which the town is located, to distinguish it from the town of Środa Wielkopolska.

During renovation works in the 1980s, a hoard of medieval silver and gold coins and jewellery, named the Środa Treasure, was found. It is now displayed in the Regional Museum in Środa Śląska and the National Museum in Wrocław.

== Folklore ==
A Silesian folk story tells how the empress of Tartary travelled through Europe until she reached Środa Śląska in 1240. The citizens decided that it was appalling for a non-Christian to display so much wealth, and killed her and all of her entourage, except two of her ladies who managed to hide and flee back to Tartary. Once there, they told the Emperor what had happened to his wife, who swore revenge and gathered an army of five hundred thousand troops. According to German antiquary Johann Gustav Gottlieb Büsching, no tradition survives telling what the outcome was, though the timespan of the story roughly corresponds with the first Mongol invasion of Poland (1240–1241). Büsching states the story was first published in a 1504 life of Saint Hedwig of Silesia, and was later turned into a folk song.

== Sights ==
Among the heritage architecture of Środa Śląska are:

- Gothic Saint Andrew church, dating back to the 12th century
- Romanesque Nativity of Mary church, a former medieval hospital church, dating back to the 13th century
- town hall, dating back to the 14th century, now housing the Regional Museum
- medieval town walls from the 13th and 14th centuries
- Exaltation of the Holy Cross church, dating back to the 14th century
- Dominican monastery, dating back to the 18th century
- Palace
- Prosecutor's office
- Post office
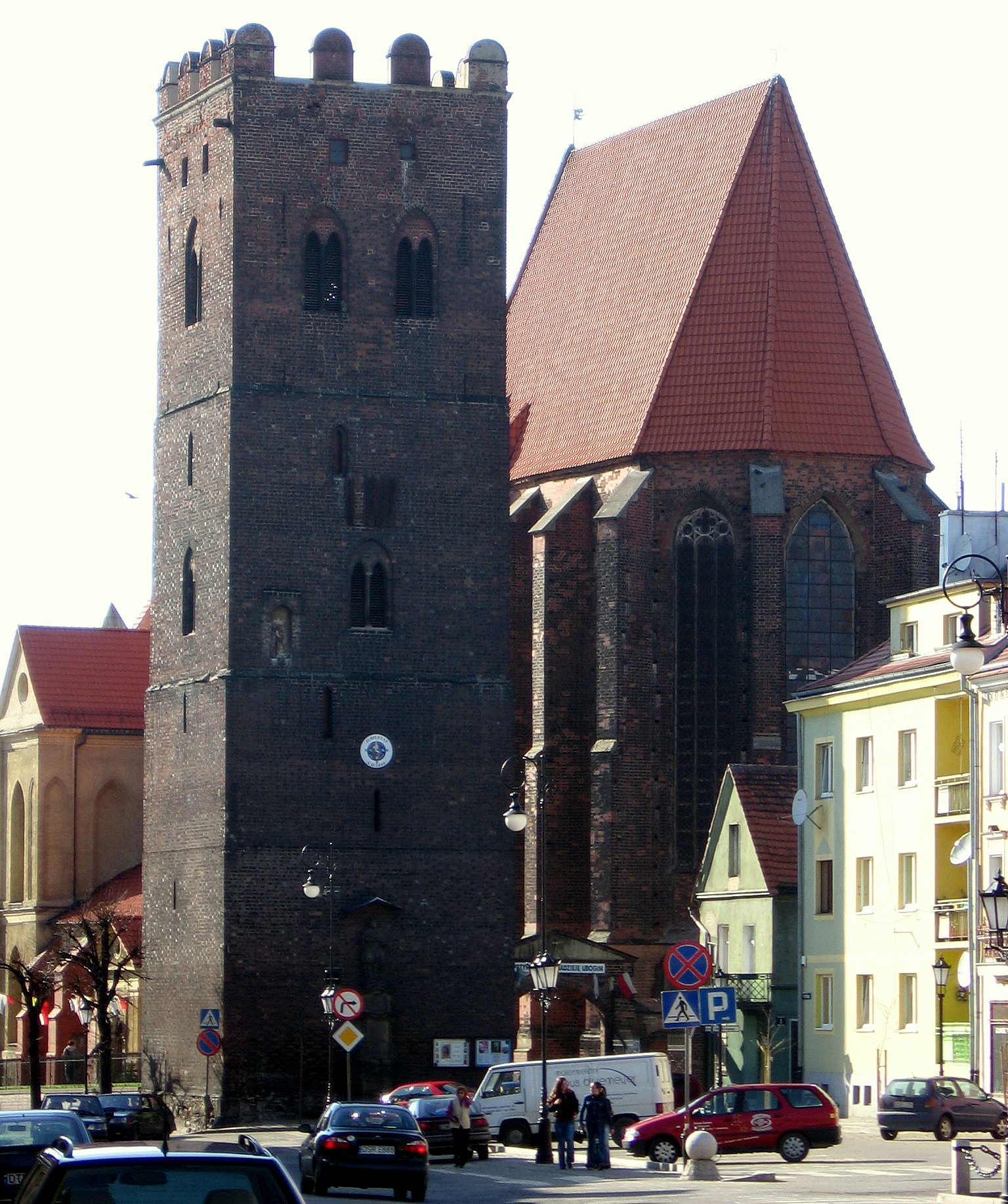
Saint Andrew church

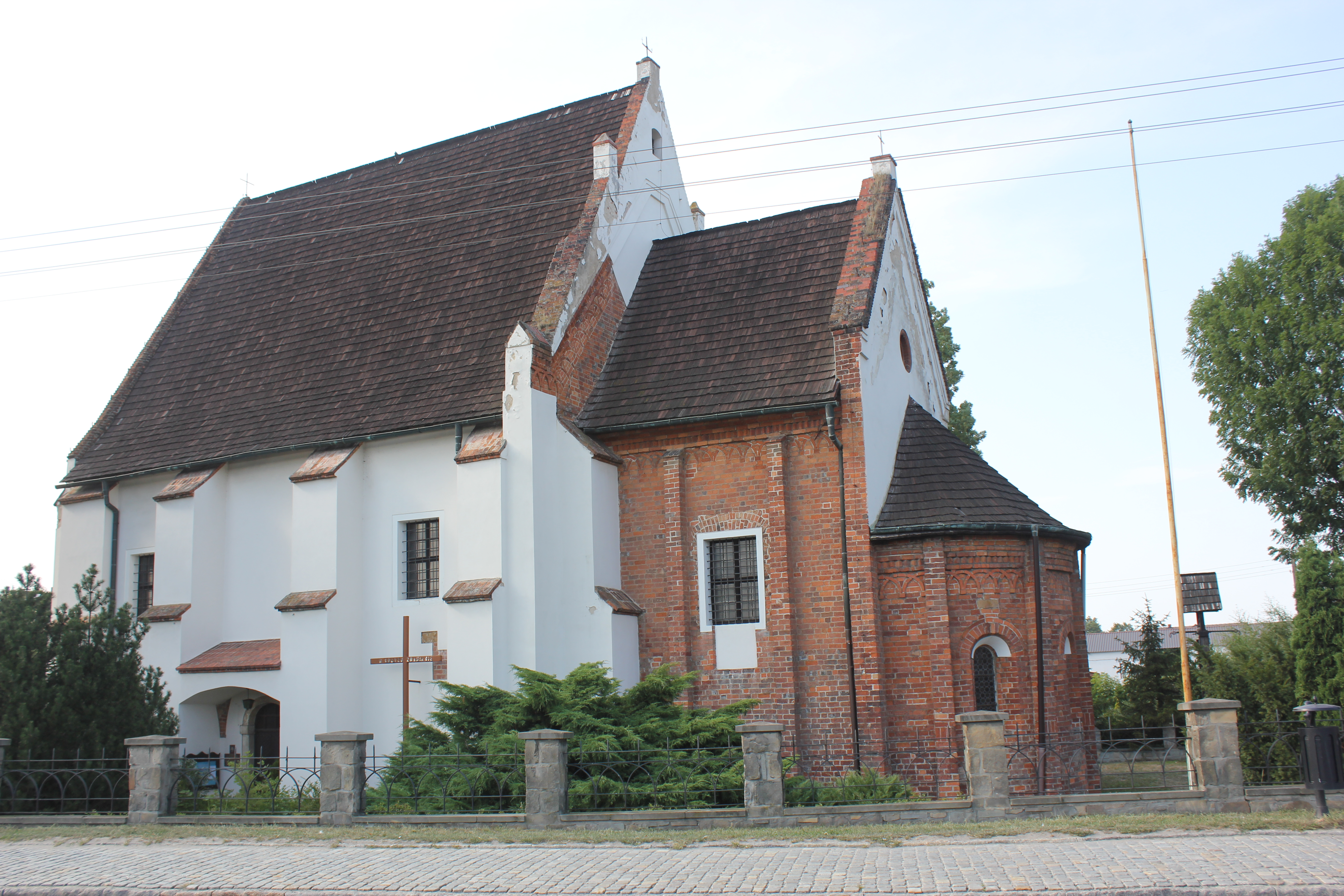
Nativity of Mary church

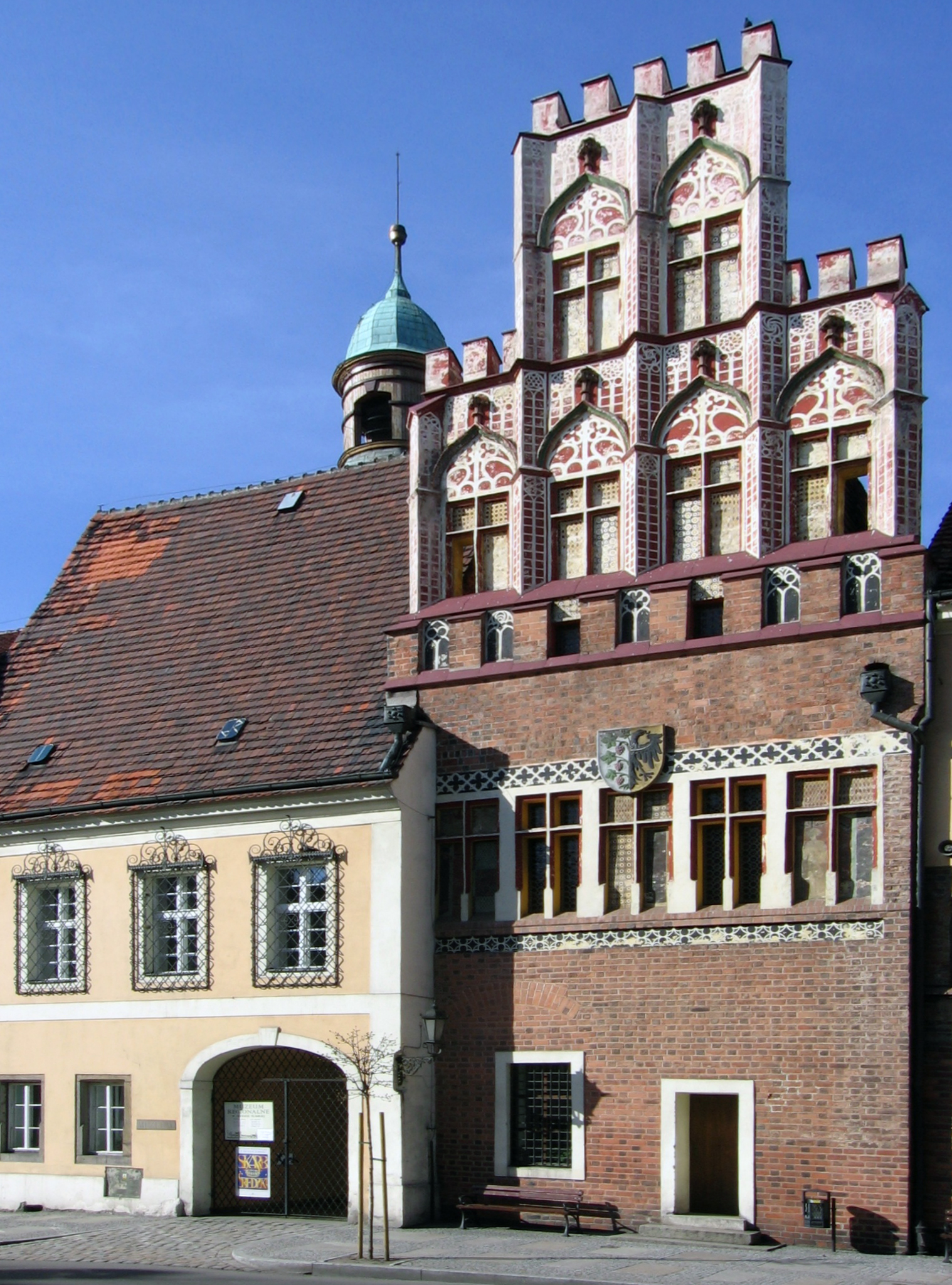
Town hall

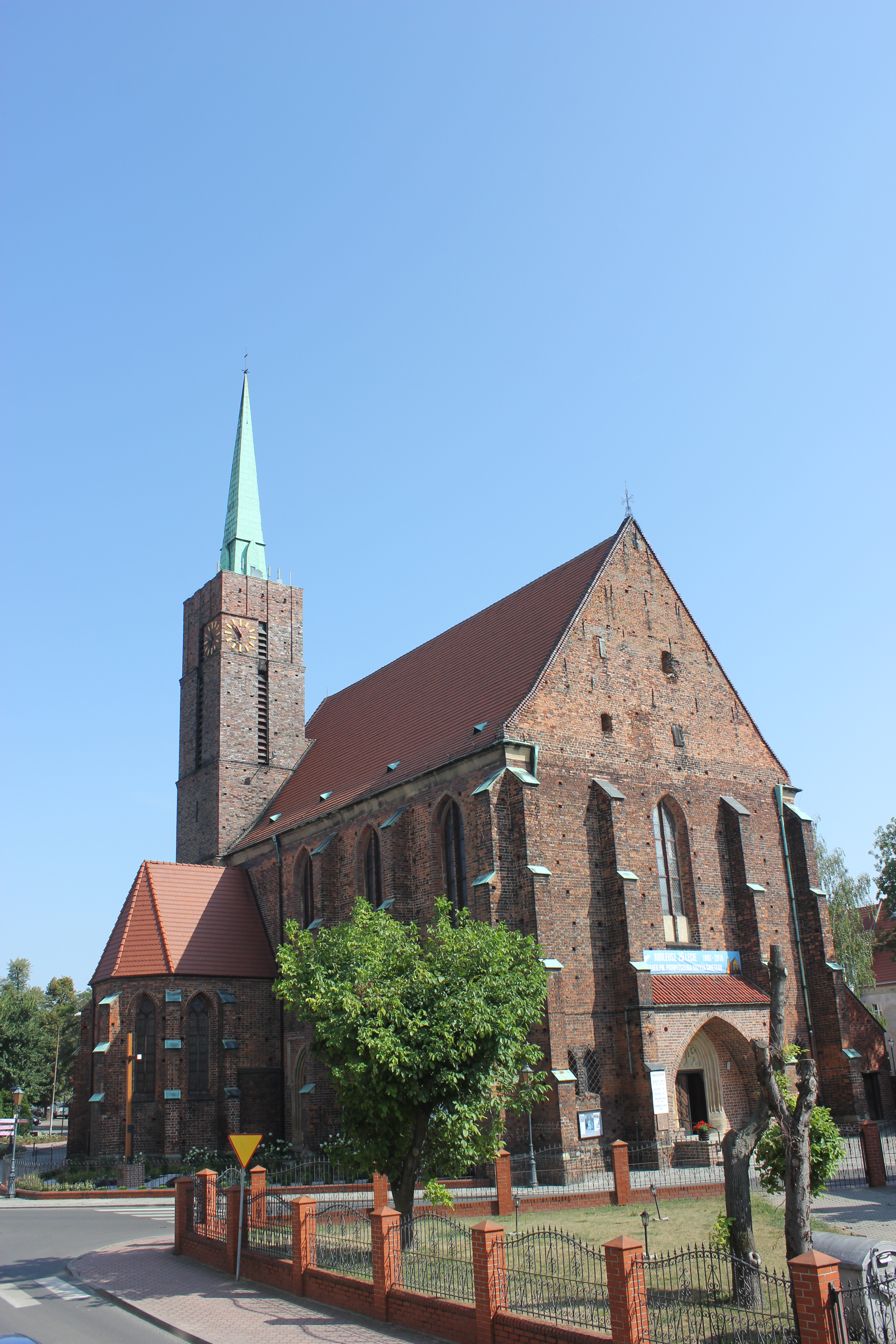
Exaltation of the Holy Cross church

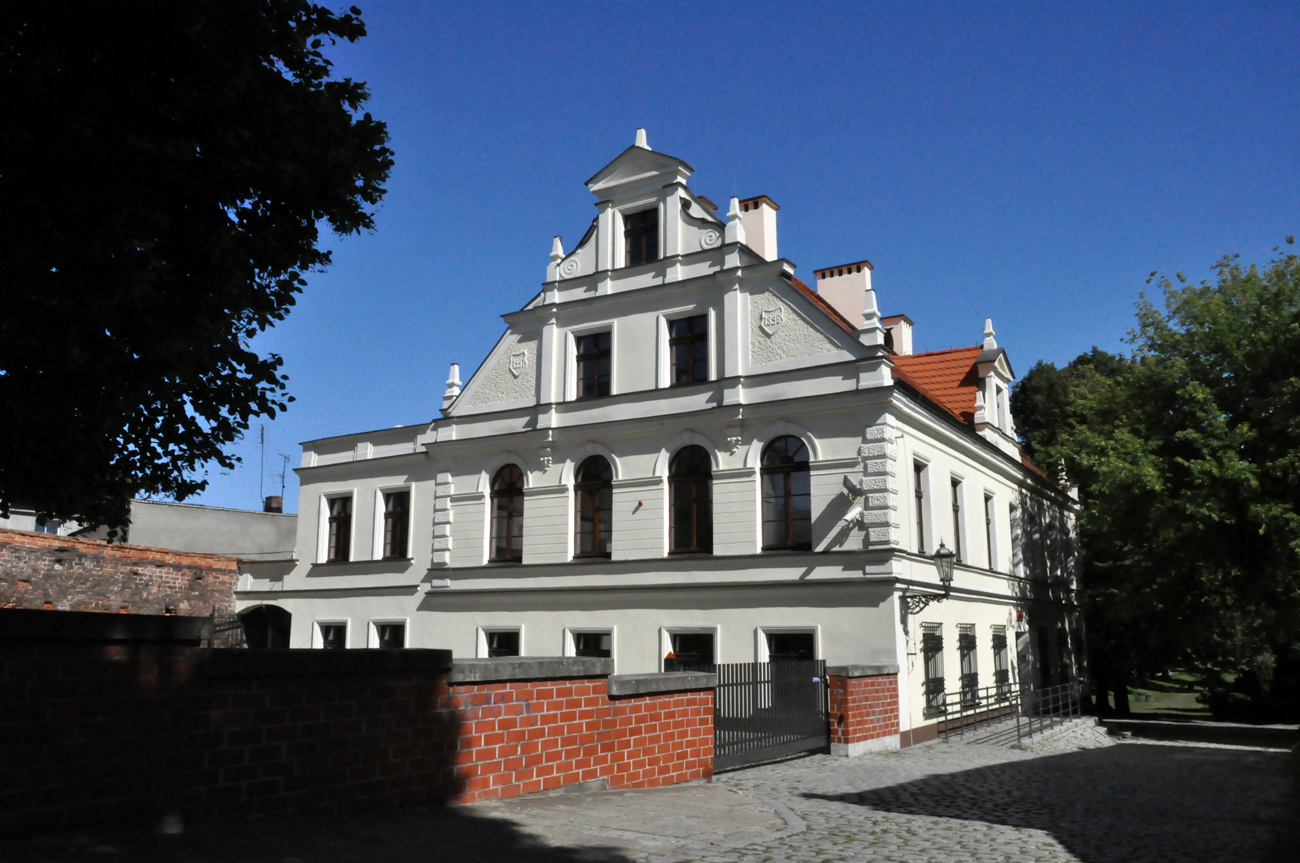
Prosecutor's office

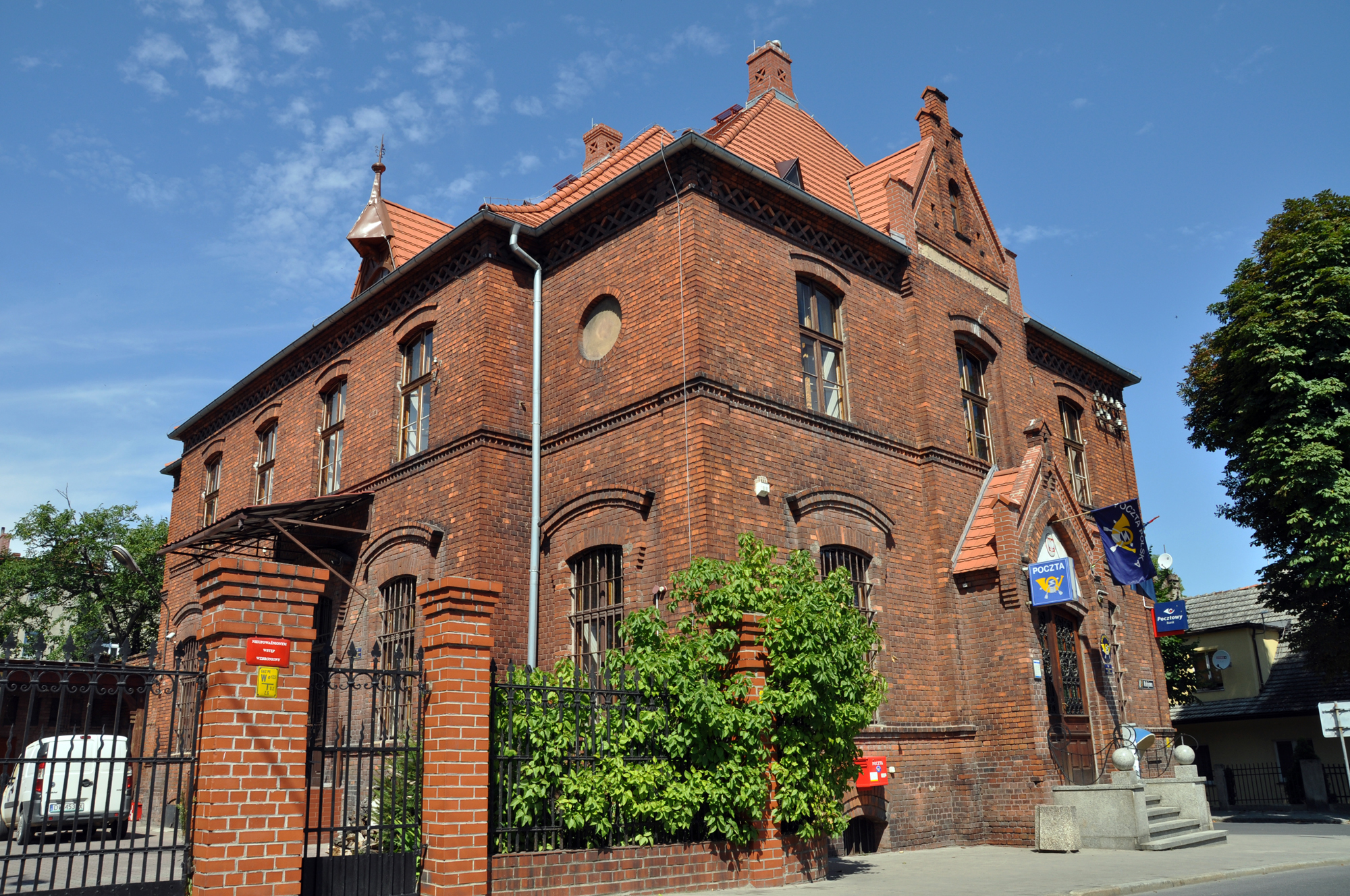
Post office

== Transport ==
National road 94 bypasses Środa Śląska to the south.

Vovoideship road 346 connects Środa Śląska to Oława.

Środa Śląska has a station on the Legnica-Wrocław railway line.

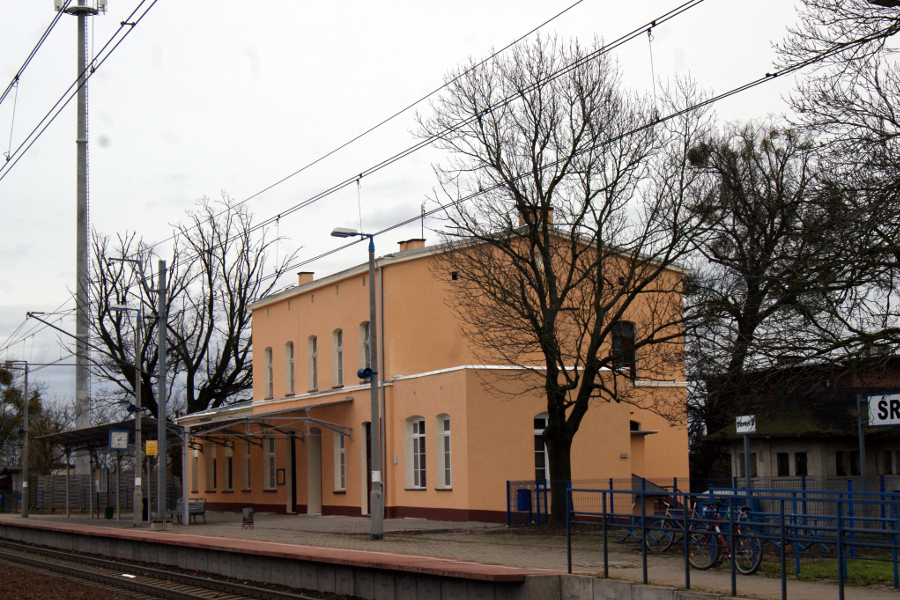
Railway station

== Sports ==
The local football club is Polonia Środa Śląska with men's and women's sections. Both compete in the lower divisions.

== Notable people ==
- Laurentius Corvinus (1465–1527), Polish scholar
- Franz Josef Kallmann (1897–1965), American psychiatrist
- Hugo von Kirchbach (1809–1887), Prussian general
- Leszek Kosedowski (born 1954), Polish boxer
- Rościsław Żerelik (born 1956), Polish historian

== Twin towns – sister cities ==
See twin towns of Gmina Środa Śląska.
