= Czech Crown =

Czech Crown/crown can refer to:

- the currency of the Czech Republic, see Czech koruna
- loosely to:
  - Lands of the Bohemian Crown
  - the crown of St. Wenceslas, see Crown of Saint Wenceslas
