= Środa Treasure =

14th-century treasure hoard found in Środa Śląska, Poland

- Skarb średzki
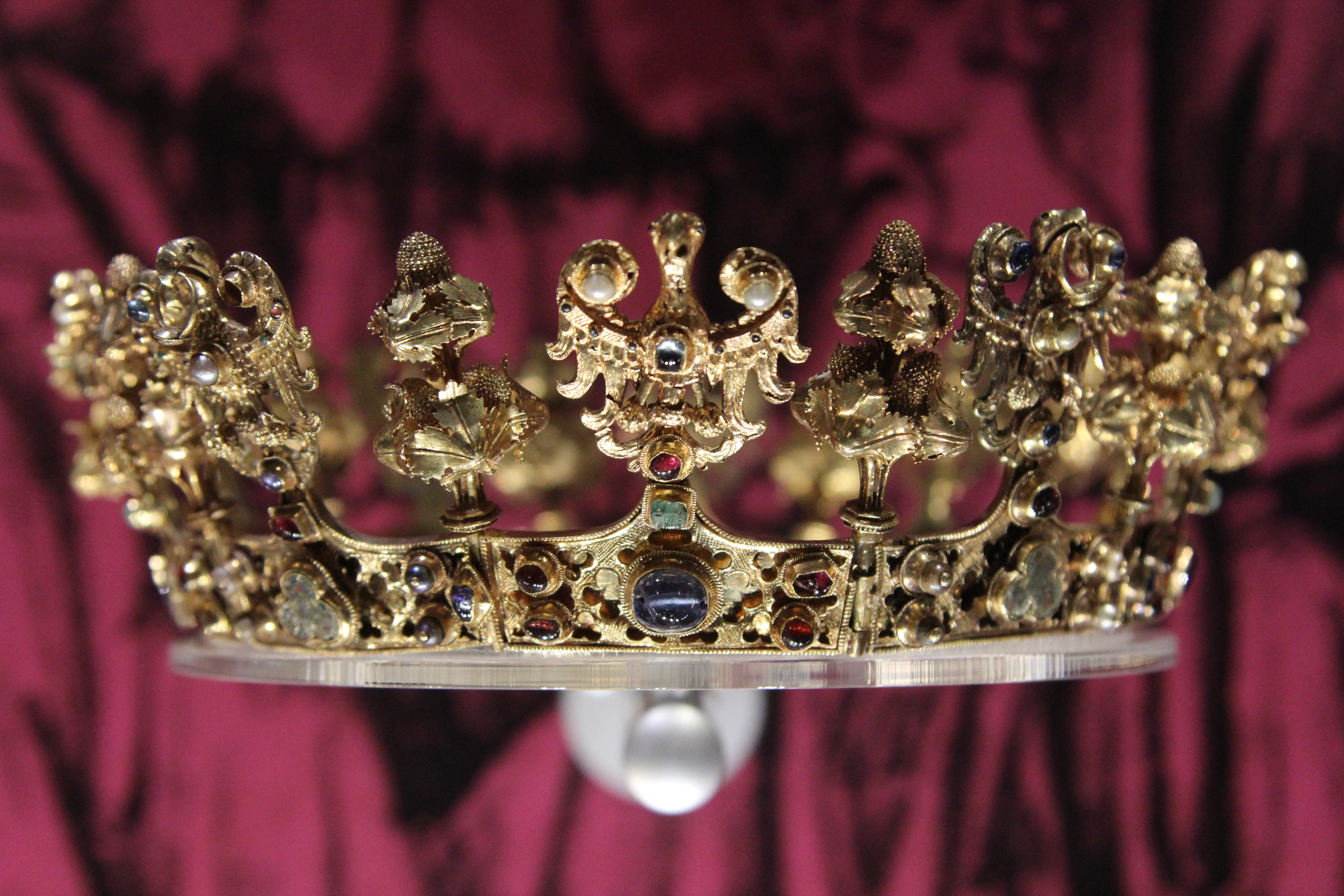
- Gold crown of the Środa Treasure
- Created: mid-14th century (deposited)
- Period/culture: Middle Ages
- Discovered: 1985–1988; Środa Śląska, Poland
- Present location: Regional Museum in Środa Śląska, Poland

The Środa Treasure (Polish: skarb ze Środy Śląskiej or skarb średzki) is a hoard of silver and gold coinage, gold jewellery, royal regalia and precious stones found in years 1985–1988 during renovation works in the town of Środa Śląska, Poland. The discovered artifacts date from the mid 14th century and comprise over 3,000 pieces. Today it is the property of National Museum in Wrocław and has been kept at the Regional Museum in Środa Śląska.

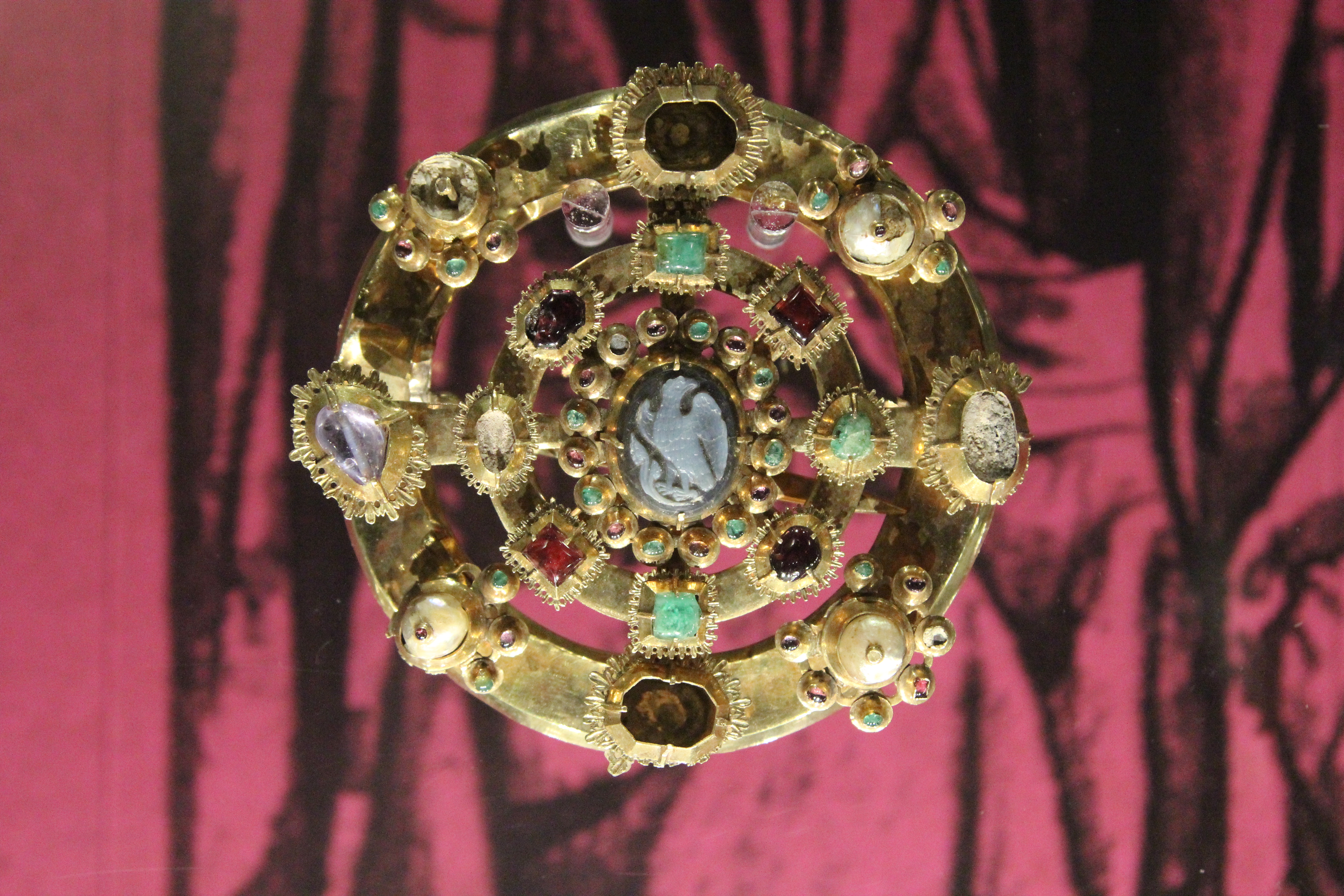
Gold clasp featuring a chalcedonic cameo with an eagle surrounded by precious stones

== Discovery and excavation ==
Gold and silver coins were discovered during demolition works and digging for the foundation of the local telephone exchange building in the town of Środa on 8 June 1985. The authorities secured the original find (a vase filled with approximately 3,000 Prague groschen), however, no serious archaeological study was carried out at that time. Three years later, on 24 May 1988, during another demolition in the vicinity of the first discovery, another, even bigger find was reported (including silver and gold florin coins). Most of this new find disappeared before the site was secured by the authorities. In the following days, as enterprising individuals scoured the municipal landfill where rubble from other recently demolished buildings was deposited, reports of more discoveries started appearing; those include the first reports of jewelry.

Archaeologists began to investigate the site, and the government announced a plan to buy back items that had been looted. Later, a criminal investigation was launched, targeting those who still refused to turn back the items they had taken. Although many items were recovered, it is agreed that there are still missing items. Looted items have been recovered intermittently.

== History ==
Over the following years, archaeologists and historians have speculated about the treasure's origins, while museums and wealthy individuals have competed for pieces of the treasure.

It is now agreed that the treasure belonged to the King (later Emperor) Charles IV of the House of Luxembourg. Around 1348, needing funds to support his claim to the title King of the Romans, Charles pawned various items to the Jewish banker Muscho (Moshe, Mojżesz) in Środa. The town was then part of the Duchy of Wroclaw (Breslau) and passed under reign of Bohemian kings in 1335. What is certain is that no one ever reclaimed the treasure, which was left hidden somewhere in the town for hundreds of years.

== The artifacts ==
Various recovered items have been cataloged, and those that were damaged by the mechanical digger that uncovered them have been restored. Some items were displayed as early as 1985. Since 1995–1997 most of them have been distributed throughout museums in Lower Silesia. The majority of the items are displayed in local museum of Środa Śląska, although in the past exhibits were held in museums including the Archaeologicial Museum in Wrocław, National Museum in Wrocław (which supervises the museum in Środa), State Museum of Archaeology in Warsaw, as well as abroad, in the Museum of Artistic Craft in Dresden, Germany, and in Valladolid, Spain.

The treasure is considered immensely valuable, described by some as "one of most valuable archaeological finds in the 20th century". In 2006 experts noted that it is difficult to put a value on it, since there are few items of similar type being auctioned anywhere in the world. One estimate from 2001 put the lowest value of the treasure at 50 million dollars; a book published in 2005 put it at 100 million dollars.

=== Highlights ===
Środa Crown
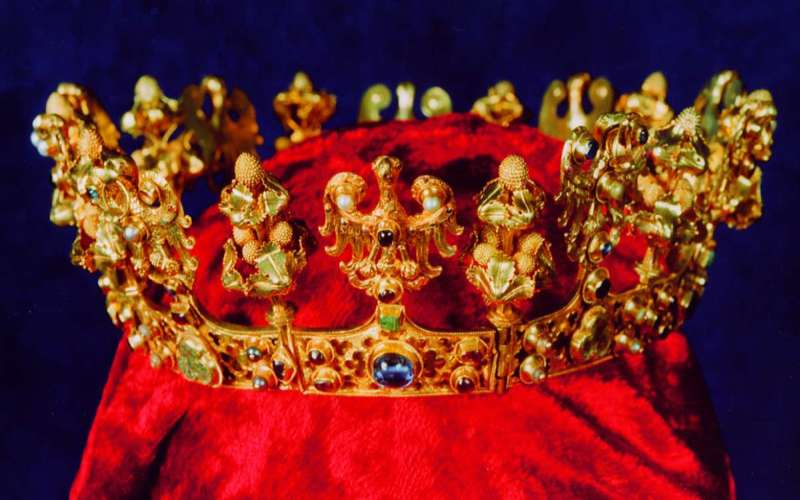
- Crown of Blanche of Valois

Details
- Country: Poland
- Made: XIV century
- Arches: None (circlet)
- Material: Gold
- Notable stones: Pearls, gemstones

The most valuable elements of the treasure include:

- a gold woman's crown, which probably belonged to Blanche of Valois, first wife of the emperor Charles IV
- two gold pendants, dating to the 12th century
- two gold pendants, dating to the 13th century
- a medieval gold clasp decorated with precious stones
- a ring with heads of dragons
- a ring with sapphire
- a ring with moon and star
- 39 gold coins (florin)
- 2924 or 3924 (sources vary) silver coins (Prague groschen)

== Gallery ==
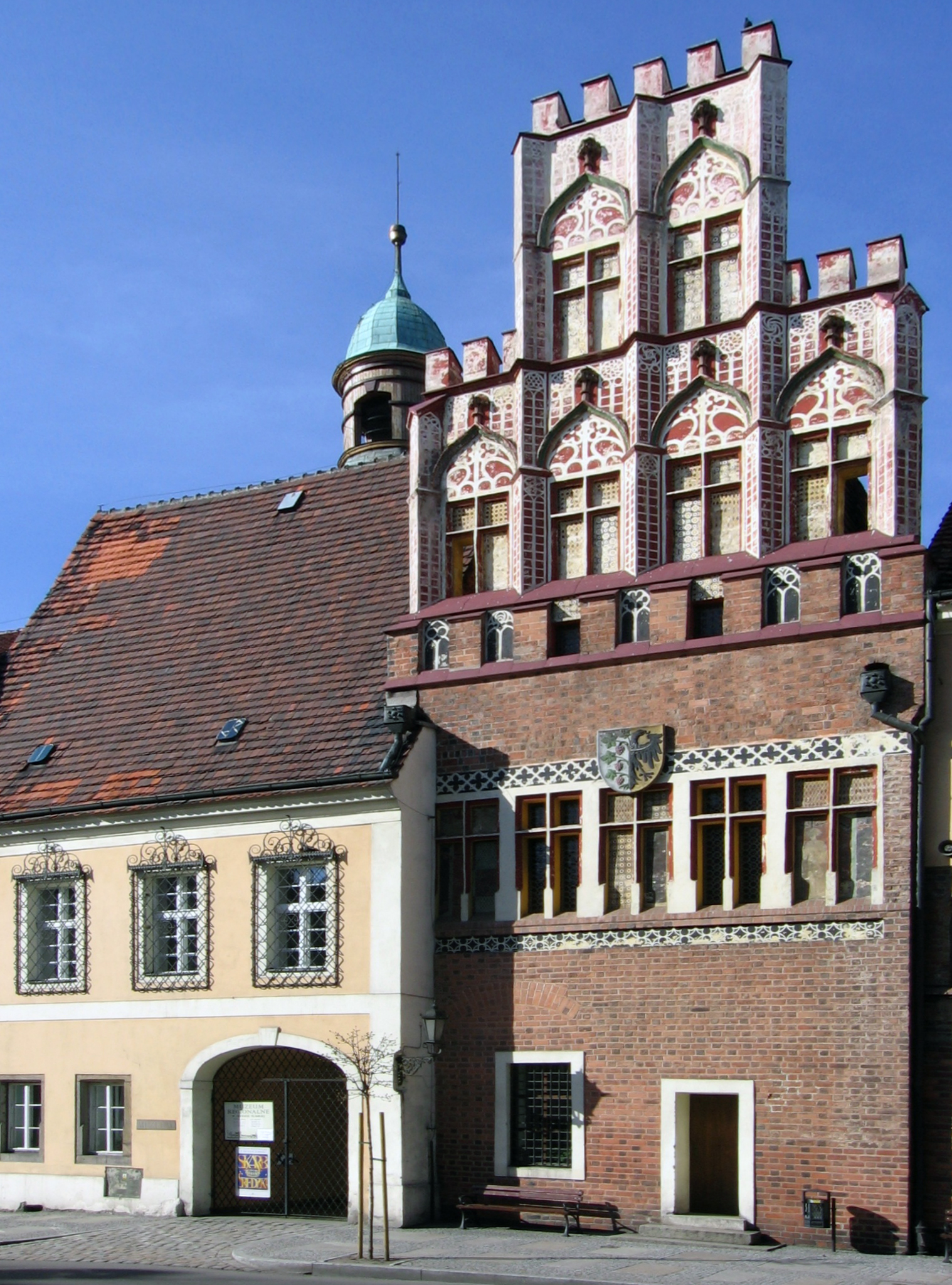
Regional Museum in Środa Śląska, where the Środa treasure is located.

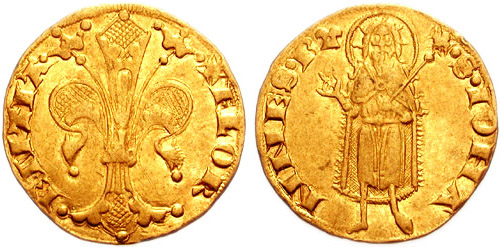
Florin from Środa treasure

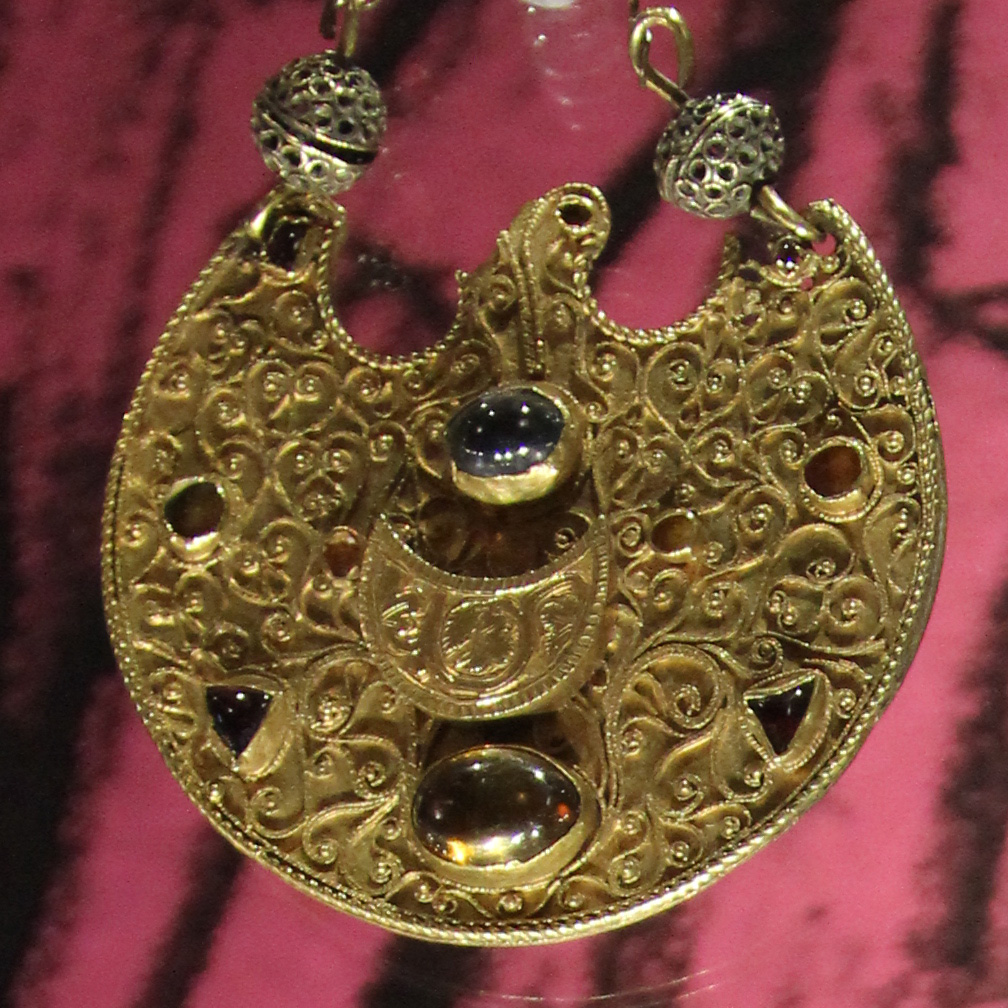
Medieval gold pendant

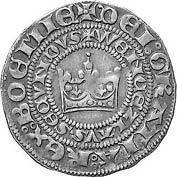
Prague groschen

== See also ==
- Słuszków Hoard
- Litva Hoard
- Colmar Treasure
