= Florin =

Gold coin and currency of the Republic of Florence

Fiorino d'oro (Italian)
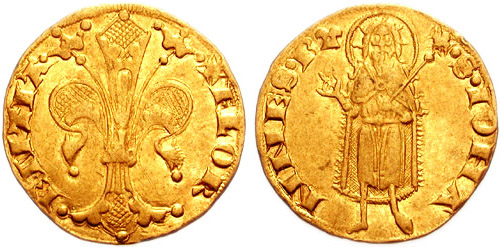
- Florin from the Środa treasure

Units of account
- Symbol: ƒ

Demographics
- User(s): Republic of Florence

Issuance
- Mint: 1252-1533

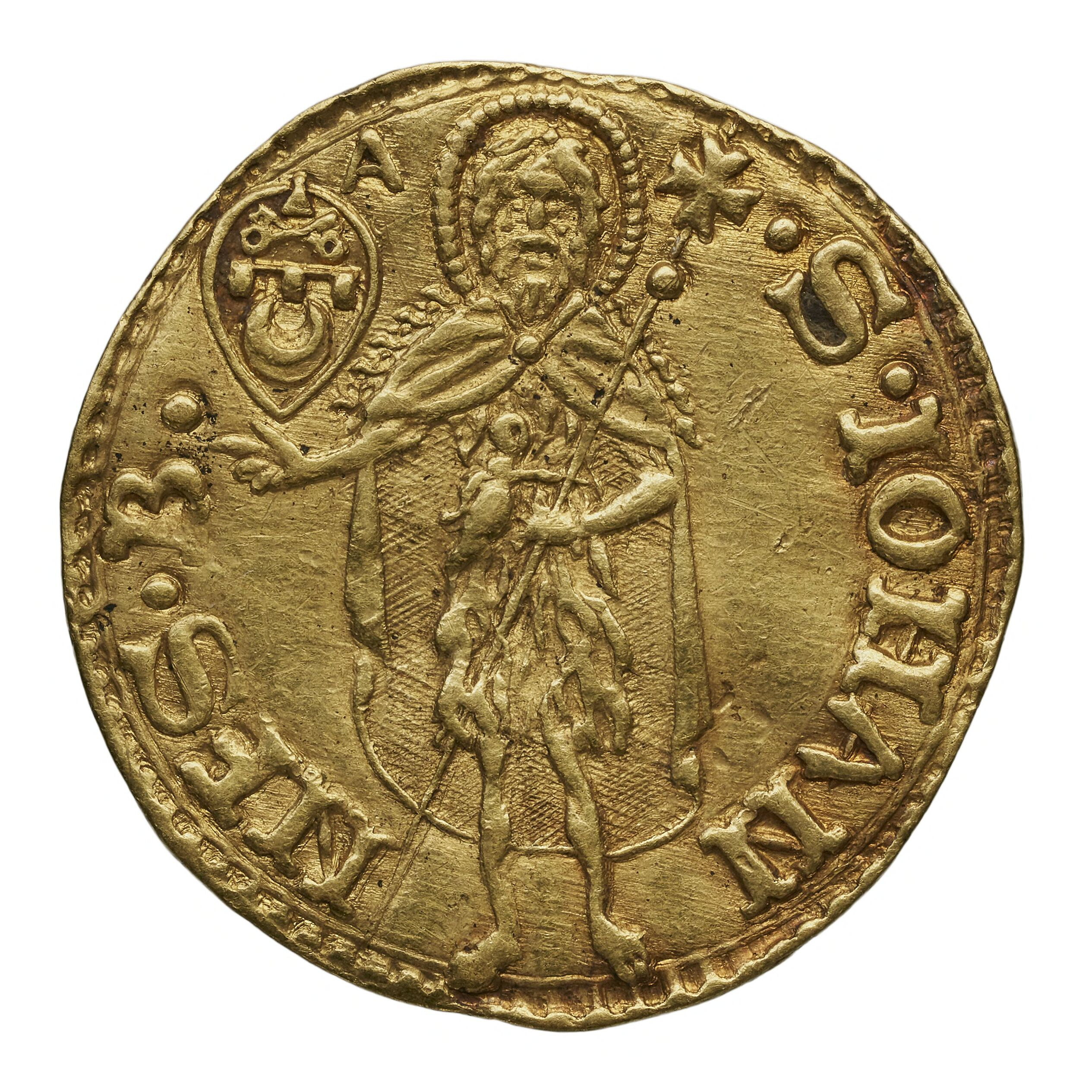
Reverse of an Italian florin coin

The Florentine florin was a gold coin (Italian: fiorino d'oro, lit. 'golden florin') struck from 1252 to 1533 with no significant change in its design or metal content standard during that time.

It had 54 grains (3.499 grams, 0.1125 troy ounces) of nominally pure or 'fine' gold, worth approximately €450 (Note: 3.54 g × ~€125/g (May 2026 value of 24k gold)= ~€443) in today's gold value. However, the modern equivalent of the purchasing power of the coin is closer to approximately €800–1,500. (Note: In 15th-century Florence, one florin could represent several days’ wages for an unskilled worker. One scholarly article notes that a florin in the 1420s bought about 8 days of unskilled labour. So by a wage-comparison method, it would be >€800–€1,500 today. It is difficult to estimate precisely (and variable) but ranging according to social grouping and perspective.) The name of the coin comes from the Giglio bottonato (it), the floral emblem of the city, which is represented at the head of the coin.

== History ==
The fiorino d'oro, 'golden florin' was minted in the Republic of Florence after the sack of Constantinople by the Fourth Crusade disrupted the minting of fine gold coins in the Byzantine Empire. It came to be accepted across Europe like the Byzantine Solidus had been.

The first minting of the florin occurred in 1252 in Florence. The golden coin was 3.49 g and had a diameter of 19.9 mm. At the time the value of the florin was equal to the lira of 20 shillings (soldi), with a shilling divided into 12 pfennigs (piccoli). However, by 1500 the florin had appreciated; seven lire amounted to one florin.

The territorial usage of the lira and the florin often overlapped; where the lira was used for smaller transactions (wages, food purchases), the florin was for larger transactions such as those used in dowries, international trade or for tax-related matters.

In the 14th century, about 150 European states and local coin-issuing authorities made their own copies of the florin. The most important of these was the Hungarian forint, because the Kingdom of Hungary was a major source of European gold in the 14th century (until then, much of Europe's gold came from sub-Saharan Africa, while gold mining in the New World began to contribute to European supplies in the 16th century).

=== Design ===
The design of the original Florentine florins was the distinctive fleur-de-lis badge of the city on one side and on the other a standing and facing figure of St. John the Baptist wearing a cilice. The symbol to the left of John’s head was the mark of the minting official responsible for the stamping. On other countries' florins, the inscriptions were changed (from "Florentia" around the fleur, and the name of the saint on the other), and local heraldic devices were substituted for the fleur-de-lis. Later, other figures were often substituted for St. John.

On the Hungarian forints, St. John was re-labelled St. Ladislaus I, an early Christian king and patron saint of Hungary, and a battle axe substituted for the original's sceptre. Gradually the image became more regal looking.

== Other coins ==
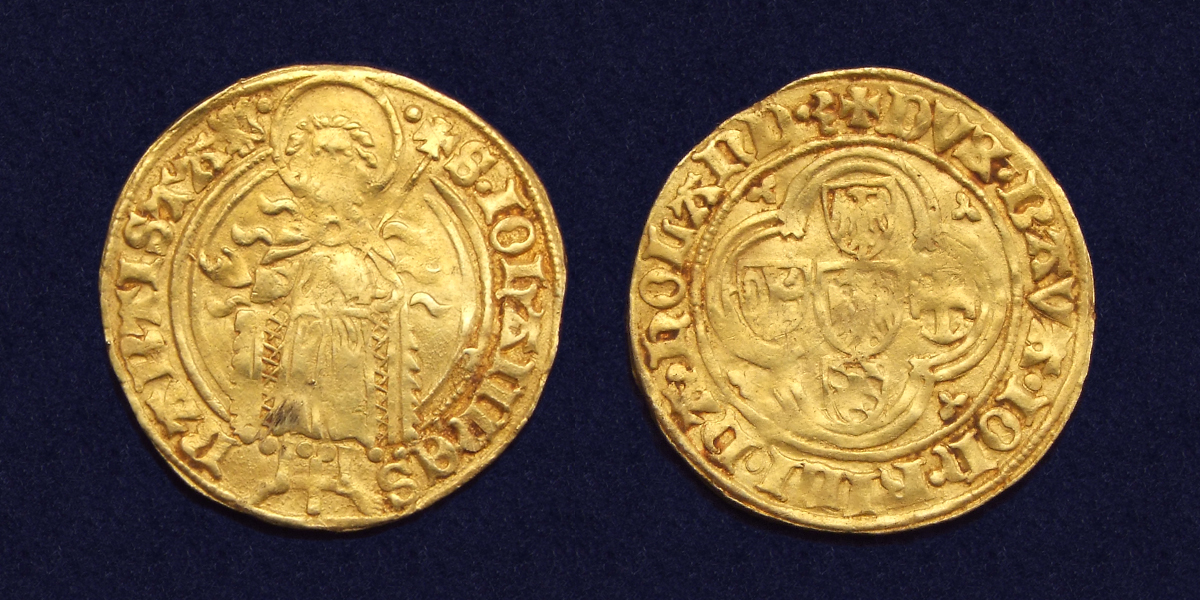
Gold florin or Beiersgulden, struck in the County of Holland under John III of Bavaria

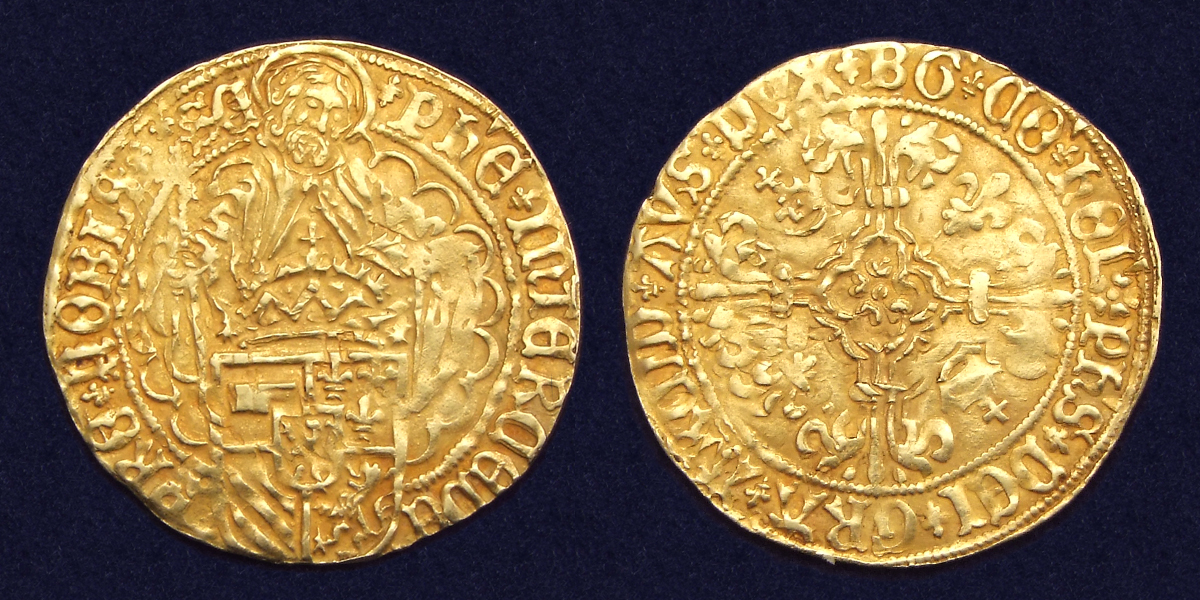
Gold florin or Philippus goudgulden, struck in Dordrecht under Philip the Fair

The term florin was borrowed elsewhere in Europe. A variant of the florin was the Rhenish gulden (German: Rheinischer Gulden), minted by several German states encompassing the commercial centres of the Rhein (Rhine) River valley, under a series of monetary conventions starting in 1354, initially at a standard practically identical to the Florentine florin (98% gold, 3.54 g). By 1419, the weight had been slightly reduced (to 3.51 grams) and the alloy was substantially reduced (to 79% gold). By 1626, the alloy had been slightly reduced again (to 77% gold), while the weight was more substantially reduced (to 3.240 g). In 1409, the Rhenish gulden standard (at the time 91.7% gold) was adopted for the Holy Roman Empire's Reichsgulden.

The Dutch currency until the 2002 introduction of the Euro, was the Dutch guilder (Dutch: gulden), symbolised as fl. or ƒ, which means florijn, 'florin'.

The English coin first issued in 1344 by Edward III of England is also known as a florin. Originally valued at six shillings, it was composed of 108 grains (6.99828 g) of gold with a purity of 23 carats and 3 1/2 grains (or 23 7/8 carats) – and more recently (minted between 1849–1967 although circulating alongside the decimal ten pence coin until 1993 when it was withdrawn due to a resizing) relating to a British pre-decimal silver coin (later nickel silver) also known as a two shilling (or two bob) "bit" (abbreviation 2/-) worth 24 pence or one-tenth of a pound.

In Ireland, a silver florin coin (worth one-tenth of an Irish pound, with Irish inscription flóirín) was minted between 1928 and 1943; it became cupronickel in 1943 and was withdrawn from use on 1 June 1994.

The Hungarian forint, first introduced in 1325 under King Charles Robert, is named after the florin.

== See also ==
- Denaro (coin)
- Florin (Australian coin)
- History of coins in Italy
- Soldo
- Venetian ducat
- Venetian grosso
- Venetian lira

== Bibliography ==
- "Ian Cnulle's Florin". Society for Creative Anachronism Archive. Archived from the original on 11 August 2017.
- Philip Grierson (1991). Coins of Medieval Europe. Seaby, London. ISBN 1-85264-058-8.
- Peter Spufford (1988). Money and its use in medieval Europe. Cambridge University Press. ISBN 0-521-37590-8.
- Peter Spufford (1986). Handbook of Medieval Exchange. Royal Historical Society, London. ISBN 0-86193-105-X.
- Richard A. Goldthwaite, The Economy of Renaissance Florence
- Stefano Locatelli (2025), The Florentine Florin. The Politics and Culture of Money in The Middle Ages. Manchester University Press, Manchester.
