= Litva Hoard =

Prague groschen hoard

External images
- Belt of Vytautas (high quality)
- Close up of one of the larger discs
- Close up of the smaller discs

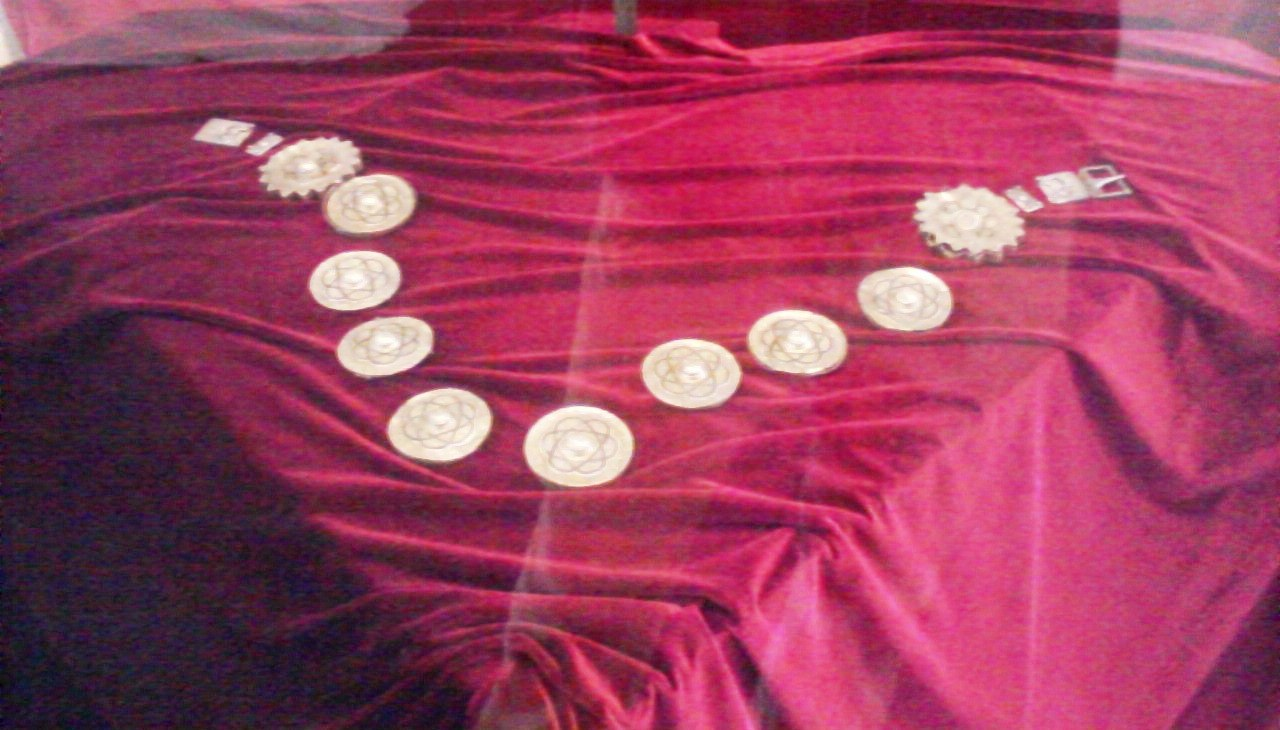
Belt of Vytautas from the hoard

Litva Hoard is a medieval treasure found near Litva village in Maladzyechna Raion, western Belarus. Discovered in the early 1990s, it contained a massive amount of Prague groschens and a large gilded silver belt. It is the largest Prague groschen hoard found in the territory of the former Grand Duchy of Lithuania. The ornate belt, blending Western and Islamic art, became popularly known as the Belt of Vytautas due to early speculations that it belonged to Grand Duke Vytautas, though recent historiography proposes alternative origins linked to the Lithuanian Civil War (1432–1438) and local Tatar artisans.

== Discovery ==
The discovery was made under unclear circumstances by earthworkers in the early 1990s. Scientists were initially not informed, and individuals attempted to profit by selling off the findings. The belt became known to the scientific community in 1994 when a collector contacted Professor Valiancin Rabcevich. The belt was inspected by experts from the Hermitage Museum who verified its authenticity, and it was added to the registry of cultural heritage of Belarus. Belarusian museums initially did not have enough funds to pay the asking price, leaving the belt in private hands. Rabcevich later inspected the site and managed to recover a significant portion of the dispersed hoard, including additional coins and a fragment of a female jewelry piece consisting of two hollow gilded silver beads strung on a silver wire.

It was later revealed that the hoard originally contained two identical silver belts. The second belt was reportedly smuggled abroad; it was located in a private collection in Paris and later London. Photographs of this second belt were sent to the Hermitage Museum for expertise in 2004, but its current whereabouts remain unknown.

Belarusian press began reporting on the Belt of Vytautas in March 2004. The known belt was sold to a Russian firm which listed it with the Paragis auction house in November 2005. The initial bid price was set at US$80,000. The item was not sold, possibly because as a registered item of cultural heritage, it cannot be legally transported outside of Belarus. Following public outcry and a campaign led by Rabcevich, the Supreme Court of Belarus ruled in 2006 to nationalize the belt. It is now kept by the National Historical Museum of the Republic of Belarus. It was also exhibited at the Palace of the Grand Dukes of Lithuania in Vilnius in 2015.

== Belt and coins ==
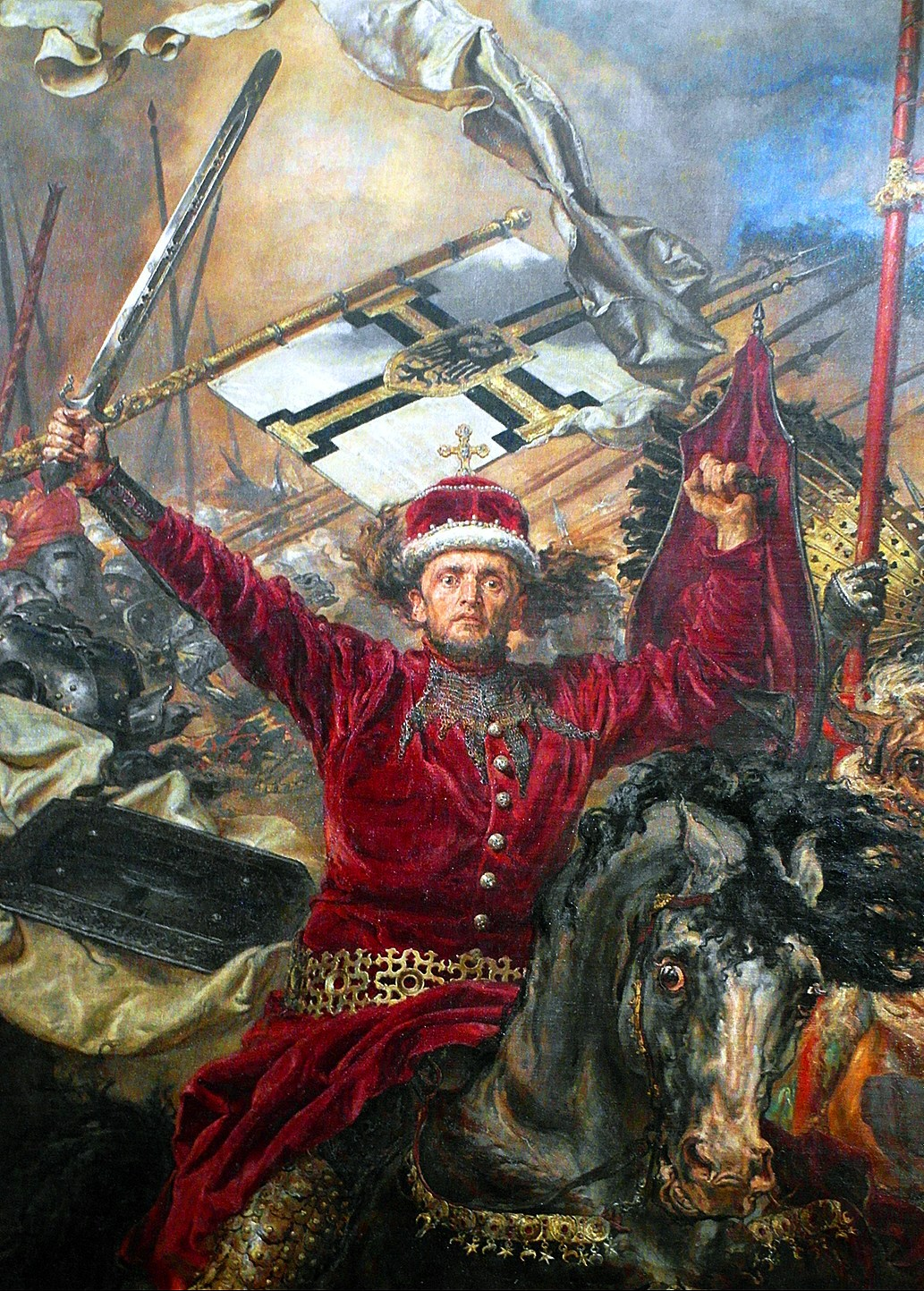
Vytautas wearing a metal belt (fragment of Battle of Grunwald by Jan Matejko)

The surviving belt consists of two star-shaped discs with sixteen rays each, nine smaller round discs, a buckle, two rectangular buckle ends, and five rectangular connecting strips, all produced from high-quality silver of 96% purity. The set weighs 805.40 grams (28.410 oz). The discs are richly decorated with scrolls, floral motifs, basilisks eating each other's tails, and birds created using the toreutics technique. The smaller discs feature a prominent darkened (niello) motif of three symmetrical interlocking ovals. The belt combines Western and Eastern art traditions: the buckle shows features of Gothic art from Venice and Lombardy, while the round discs exhibit features of Islamic art.

The numismatic portion of the recovered hoard consists of 6,244 Prague groschens (earlier reports mentioned 6,191 coins). They were minted in Kutná Hora during the reigns of John of Bohemia, Charles IV, and predominantly Wenceslaus IV (1378–1419).

== Theories ==
=== Crimean gift ===
Early researchers, including Valiancin Rabcevich and Mark Kramarovsky, proposed that the pieces were produced separately in Italy (possibly Genoa) and in Kaffa (now Feodosia, Crimea) between the end of the 14th century and the first half of the 15th century. A popular theory suggested the belt was a diplomatic gift from Hacı I Giray, the first Khan of the Crimean Khanate, to Grand Duke Vytautas. This theory relied on a historical record indicating Vytautas received Tatar envoys with rich gifts in Minsk in August 1428. Rabcevich hypothesized the hoard was hidden shortly after during the turbulent Lithuanian Civil War (1432–1438)..

=== Battle of Kapačy ===
In 2011, historian Vasil Varonin offered a more precise historical context for the hoard. During the civil war, on approximately 21 August 1433, a major battle occurred near the village of Kapačy, just 8 kilometres (5.0 mi) east of Litva, between the forces of Švitrigaila and Sigismund Kęstutaitis. Sigismund's army, commanded by Piotr Montygierdowicz (Petrash Mantygirdovich), was completely defeated. The absence of packaging around the hoard suggests it was buried in great haste. Varonin proposed that the hoard was Montygierdowicz's field treasury, buried by fleeing survivors of the battle who were subsequently captured or killed. Montygierdowicz might have acquired the belt earlier in 1431 when he served as an envoy to the Golden Horde khan Ulugh Muhammad to conclude a peace treaty.

=== Local Tatar artisan ===
In 2014, Belarusian historian Aleh Litskevich challenged the Crimean import theory and the "Belt of Vytautas" legend. He demonstrated that the 1428 Minsk meeting was a historiographical myth stemming from a 19th-century mistranslation of a letter by Vytautas's jester, Henne. The original German text mentioned the Russian town of Mtsensk ("Myssensytk"), not Minsk, and the meeting actually took place in 1427. Furthermore, the phrase about Tatars "from southern borders" was a mistranslation of the German in dem gebite (meaning "in that territory").

Instead, Litskevich pointed to the Lithuanian Metrica, which records that in the 1440s, Grand Duke Casimir IV Jagiellon granted land in Maladzyechna to a "silver smith" named Khatsabey (a variant of the Turkic name Hacı-Bey). Lipka Tatars had been settling in the Maladzyechna area since the early 15th century. Litskevich concluded that the belt was likely crafted locally in the Grand Duchy of Lithuania by Khatsabey or his apprentices in the 1430s or 1440s, blending imported Islamic and Western styles with local craftsmanship. The exact owner remains unknown, though it may have belonged to a prominent local nobleman or military commander.

== Bibliography ==
- Litskevich, Aleh (2014). «Срэбны каваль» Хацабей з-пад Маладзечна (XV ст.): яшчэ раз пра магчымае паходжанне срэбных паясных набораў са скарбу каля в. Літва ["Silver smith" Khatsabey from near Maladzyechna (15th century): once again about the possible origin of silver belt sets from the treasure near the village of Litva]. Беларуская даўніна (in Belarusian) (1): 108–121.
- Ryabtsevich, Valiantsin (2007). Клад из деревни Литва в Беларуси. International Numismatic Symposium "Iconography of Money in Central and Eastern Europe" [Treasure from the village of Litva in Belarus] (in Russian). Humenné. pp. 44–45.
- Varonin, Vasil (2011). Да пытання аб часе і абставінах ухавання грашова-рэчавага скарбу каля вёскі Літва Маладзечанскага раёна Мінскай вобласці [On the question of the time and circumstances of the storage of a monetary and material treasure near the village of Litva, Maladzyechna District, Minsk Region]. Studia Numismatica Albaruthenica (in Belarusian). I. Medysont: 94–105. ISBN 978-985-6982-37-1.
