= Crown of Saint Wenceslas =

Crown in the Kingdom of Bohemia

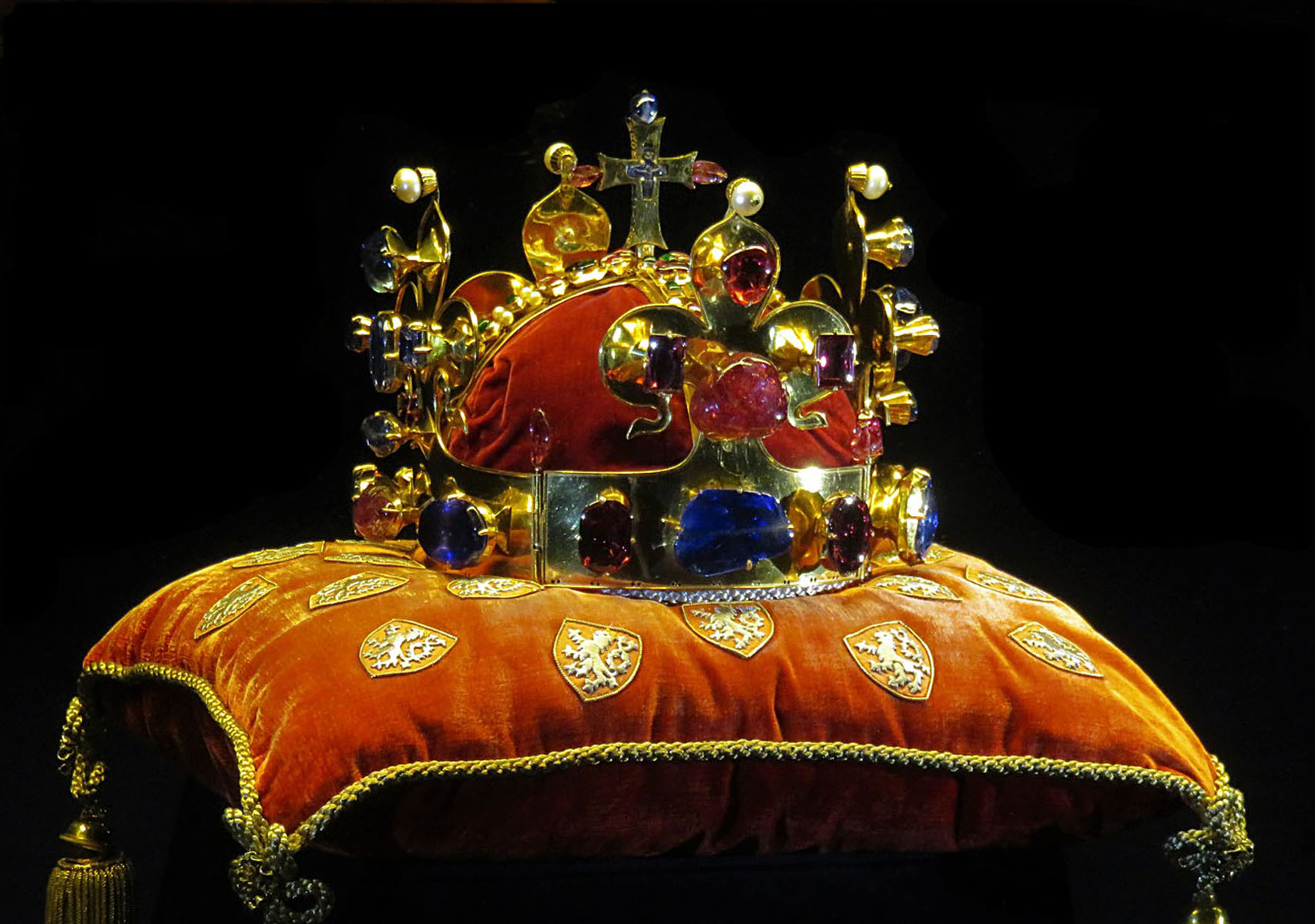

Heraldic depictions

Details
- Country: Kingdom of Bohemia
- Made: 1346
- Weight: 2,36 kg
- Arches: 4
- Material: Gold
- Cap: Red
- Notable stones: 20 pearls 19 sapphires 44 spinels 30 emeralds 1 red elbaite

The crown of Saint Wenceslas (Czech: Svatováclavská koruna, German: Wenzelskrone) is a crown forming part of the Bohemian crown jewels, made in 1346. Charles IV, king of Bohemia and Holy Roman Emperor, had it made for his coronation, dedicating it to the first patron saint of the country St. Wenceslas and bequeathed it as a state crown for the coronation of (future) Bohemian kings. On the orders of Charles IV, the new royal crown was deposited in St. Vitus Cathedral, then later transferred to Karlštejn Castle. It was used for the last time in the coronation of Ferdinand V in 1836.

== Description ==
The St. Wenceslas Crown is made of 21 to 22 carat (88 to 92%) gold and decorated with 91 precious stones and 20 pearls. It has a total of 19 sapphires, 44 spinels, 30 emeralds and 1 red elbaite (variety rubellite), often falsely referred to as ruby.

The crown has two hoops and an upstanding cross at the point of intersection. There is no monde; the cross stands directly on the crown. It weighs two and a half kilograms. The sapphire cross has an inset cameo in which the scene of the Crucifixion is cut.

== Location ==
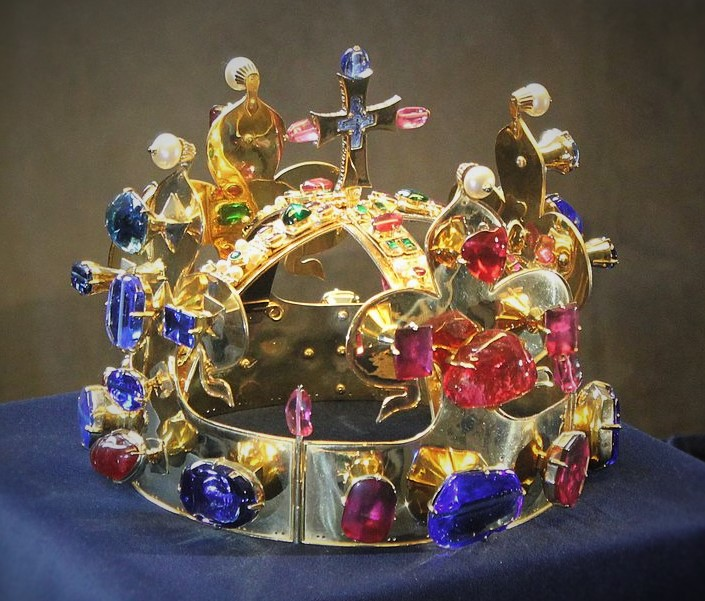
Replica of the crown in the Old Royal Palace of Prague Castle

Unlike many other European royal treasures, the St. Wenceslas Crown is not normally displayed to the public, and only a replica is shown. Along with the other Bohemian crown jewels, it is kept in a chamber within St. Vitus Cathedral accessible by a door in the St. Wenceslas Chapel. The exact location of the chamber is not known to the general public. The entrance to the jewels is locked by seven locks whose keys are held by the President of the Czech Republic, the Speaker of the Chamber of Deputies, the President of the Senate, the Prime Minister, the Mayor of Prague, the Archbishop of Prague, and the Dean of the Metropolitan Chapter of St. Vitus Cathedral in Prague. The jewels are only taken from the chamber and displayed for periods of several days on notable occasions approximately once every five years. The crown was exhibited in May 2016 to mark the 700th anniversary of the birth of Charles IV, and in May 2013, celebrating the inauguration of a new Czech president.

== Legend ==
An old Czech legend says that any usurper who places the crown on his head is doomed to die a violent death within a year, as the Crown is the personal property of St. Wenceslas and may only be worn by a rightful Bohemian king during his coronation. During World War II, Reinhard Heydrich, the Deputy Protector of Bohemia and Moravia, is said to have secretly crowned himself while inspecting St. Vitus' Cathedral, and was assassinated less than a year later by the Czech resistance. Although there is no evidence proving that Heydrich did so, the legend is widely believed.

In November 1945, a rumor held that the crown had been stolen by Heydrich and sold in Germany, and that the version recovered in Prague after the end of World War II was in fact a forgery.

== See also ==
- Środa Treasure
