= Rościsław Żerelik =

Polish historian

- Born: 1956 (age 69–70)
- Citizenship: Wrocław
- Education: University of Wrocław
- Occupation: Historian
- Employer: University of Wrocław
- Known for: Silesian History

Rościsław Żerelik (born 1956) is a Polish historian specializing in medieval history, history of supporting science, and the history of Silesia in the Middle Ages.
