= Lands of the Bohemian Crown =

Incorporated states in Central Europe during the medieval and early modern periods

Coordinates: 50.0833°N 14.4167°E

Lands of the Bohemian Crown Země Koruny české (Czech) Länder der Böhmischen Krone (German) Corona regni Bohemiae (Latin)
- 1348–1918
- Flag Coat of arms

- Lands of the Bohemian Crown within the Holy Roman Empire (1618)
- Status: States of the Holy Roman Empire (1348–1806), Crown lands of the Habsburg monarchy (1526–1804), of the Austrian Empire (1804–1867), and of the Cisleithanian part of Austria-Hungary (1867–1918)
- Capital: Prague
- Common languages: Czech; German; Latin
- Religion: Official religions: Latin Catholicism; Hussitism, later Bohemian Reformed (Utraquism, Brethren); Others: Lutheranism (majority during Reformation); Judaism (Jews); Calvinism; Hutterian Anabaptism; Waldensianism; Neo-Adamitism
- Government: Monarchy
- King
  - 1346–1378: Charles I (first)
  - 1916–1918: Charles III (last)
- History
  - Bohemian Crown established: 7 April 1348
  - Inauguration of the Luxembourg dynasty: 7 April 1348
  - Became main part of Bohemian Crown lands: 5 April 1355
  - King confirmed Elector: 25 December 1356
  - King Ferdinand I, Holy Roman Emperor becomes king of Bohemia: 16 December 1526
  - Integrated into Austrian Empire: August 1804
  - Dissolution of the Austro-Hungarian Monarchy: 31 October 1918

Population
  - 1600: 2,950,000
Preceded by
Kingdom of Bohemia
Margraviate of Moravia
Duchies of Silesia
Upper Lusatia
Lower Lusatia
Bohemian Crown lands controlled by the Hussite movement
Egerland
Upper Palatinate (Electoral Palatinate)
Succeeded by
First Czechoslovak Republic
Electorate of Saxony
Free State of Prussia
Second Polish Republic
- Today part of: Czech Republic; Germany; Poland

The Lands of the Bohemian Crown were the states in Central Europe during the medieval and early modern periods with feudal obligations to the Bohemian kings. The crown lands primarily consisted of the Kingdom of Bohemia, an electorate of the Holy Roman Empire according to the Golden Bull of 1356, the Margraviate of Moravia, the duchies of Silesia, and the two Lusatias, known as the Margraviate of Upper Lusatia and the Margraviate of Lower Lusatia, as well as other territories throughout its history. This agglomeration of states nominally under the rule of the Bohemian kings was referred to simply as Bohemia.

The joint rule of Corona regni Bohemiae was legally established by decree of King Charles IV issued on 7 April 1348, on the foundation of the original Czech lands ruled by the Přemyslid dynasty until 1306. By linking the territories, the interconnection of crown lands thus no more belonged to a king or a dynasty but to the Bohemian monarchy itself, symbolized by the Crown of Saint Wenceslas. During the reign of King Ferdinand I from 1526, the lands of the Bohemian Crown became a constituent part of the Habsburg monarchy. A large part of Silesia was lost in the mid-18th century, but the rest of the Lands passed to the Austrian Empire and the Cisleithanian half of Austria-Hungary. By the Czechoslovak declaration of independence in 1918, the remaining Czech lands became part of the First Czechoslovak Republic.

The Bohemian Crown was neither a personal union nor a federation of equal members. Rather, the Kingdom of Bohemia had a higher status than the other incorporated constituent countries. There were only some common state institutions of the Bohemian Crown that did not survive the centralization of the Habsburg monarchy under Queen Maria Theresa in the 18th century. The most important of them was the Bohemian Court Chancellery which was united with the Austrian Chancellery in 1749.

== Name ==
The Lands of the Bohemian Crown (Latin: Corona regni Bohemiae, lit. Crown of the Kingdom of Bohemia) are called země Koruny české or simply Koruna česká (Crown of Bohemia or Bohemian Crown) and České země (i.e. Czech lands), the Czech adjective český referring to both "Bohemian" and "Czech". The German term Länder der Böhmischen Krone is likewise shortened to Böhmische Krone or Böhmische Kronländer. Native names include Silesian: Korōna Czeskigo Krōlestwa, Lower Sorbian: zemje Českeje krony, and Upper Sorbian: kraje Čěskeje Króny. The denotation Lands of the Crown of Saint Wenceslas (země Koruny svatováclavské) refers to the Crown of Saint Wenceslas, part of the regalia of the Bohemian monarchs.

== History ==
=== Přemyslids ===
In the 10th and 11th century, the Duchy of Bohemia, together with Moravia (the Margraviate of Moravia from 1182 on), and Kłodzko Land were consolidated under the ruling Přemyslid dynasty.

Duke Ottokar I of Bohemia gained the hereditary royal title to the Duchy of Bohemia in 1198, from the German (anti)−king Philip of Swabia, for his support. Along with the title, Philip also raised the duchy to the Kingdom of Bohemia rank. The regality was ultimately confirmed by Philip's nephew the German King Frederick II, later the Holy Roman Emperor (1220−1250), in the Golden Bull of Sicily issued in 1212.

The Přemyslid king Ottokar II of Bohemia acquired the Duchy of Austria in 1251, the Duchy of Styria in 1261, the Egerland in 1266, the Duchy of Carinthia with the March of Carniola and the Windic March in 1269 as well as the March of Friuli in 1272. His plans to turn Bohemia into the leading Imperial State were aborted by his Habsburg rival King Rudolph I of Germany, who seized his acquisitions and finally defeated him in the 1278 Battle on the Marchfeld.

=== Luxembourgers ===
In 1306, the House of Luxembourg began producing Bohemian kings upon the extinction of the Přemyslids. They significantly enlarged the Bohemian lands again, including when King John the Blind vassalized most Polish Piast dukes of Silesia. His suzerainty was acknowledged by the Polish king Casimir III the Great in the 1335 Treaty of Trentschin. John also achieved the enfeoffment with the Upper Lusatian lands of Bautzen (1319) and Görlitz (1329), by the German king Louis IV.

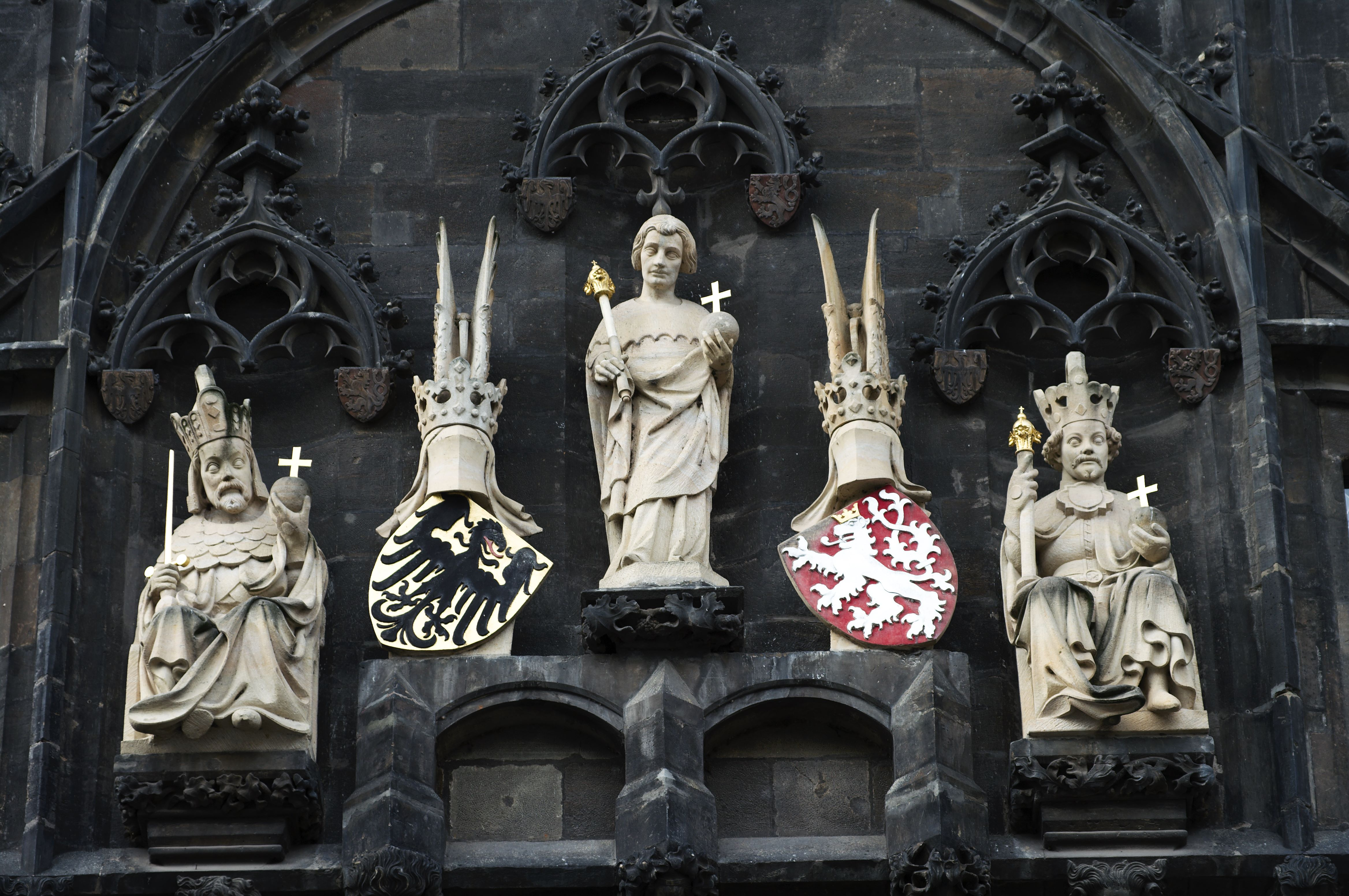
Coats of arms of the Holy Roman Empire and the Bohemian Crown on the Tower of Charles Bridge in Prague.

King John's eldest son Charles IV was elected king of the Romans in 1346 and succeeded his father as king of Bohemia in the same year. In 1348, Charles IV introduced the concept of the Crown of Bohemia (Corona regni Bohemiae in Latin), a term which designated the whole state hereditarily ruled by the kings of Bohemia, not only its core territory of Bohemia but also the incorporated provinces.

The Luxembourg dynasty reached its high point, when Charles was crowned Holy Roman Emperor in 1355. By his Imperial authority he decreed that the united Bohemian lands should endure regardless of dynastic developments, even if the Luxembourgs should die out.

In 1367, he purchased Lower Lusatia from his stepson Margrave Otto V of Brandenburg and the Margraviate of Brandenburg. Beside their home County of Luxembourg itself, the dynasty held further non-contiguous Imperial fiefs in the Low Countries, such as: the Duchy of Brabant and Duchy of Limburg, acquired through marriage by Charles' younger half-brother Wenceslaus of Luxembourg in 1355; as well as the Margraviate of Brandenburg, purchased in 1373. As both the king of Bohemia and the margrave of Brandenburg had been designated prince-electors in the Golden Bull of 1356, the Luxembourgs held two votes in the electoral college, securing the succession of Charles's son Wenceslaus in 1376.

With King Wenceslaus, the decline of the Luxembourg dynasty began. He himself was deposed as king of the Romans in 1400. The duchies of Brabant, Limburg (in 1406), and even Luxembourg itself (in 1411) were ceded to the French House of Valois-Burgundy; while the Margraviate of Brandenburg passed to the House of Hohenzollern (in 1415). Nevertheless, the joint rule of the Bohemian Lands outlived the Hussite Wars and the extinction of the Luxembourg male line upon the death of Emperor Sigismund in 1437.

=== Jagiellons ===
Vladislas II of the Jagiellon dynasty, son of the Polish king Casimir IV, was designated king of Bohemia in 1471, while the crown lands of Moravia, Silesia, and the Lusatias were occupied by rivaling King Matthias Corvinus of Hungary. In 1479, both kings signed the Treaty of Olomouc, whereby the unity of the Bohemian crown lands was officially retained unchanged and the monarchs appointed each other as sole heir. Upon the death of King Matthias in 1490, Vladislas ruled the Bohemian crown lands and the Kingdom of Hungary in personal union.

=== Habsburgs ===
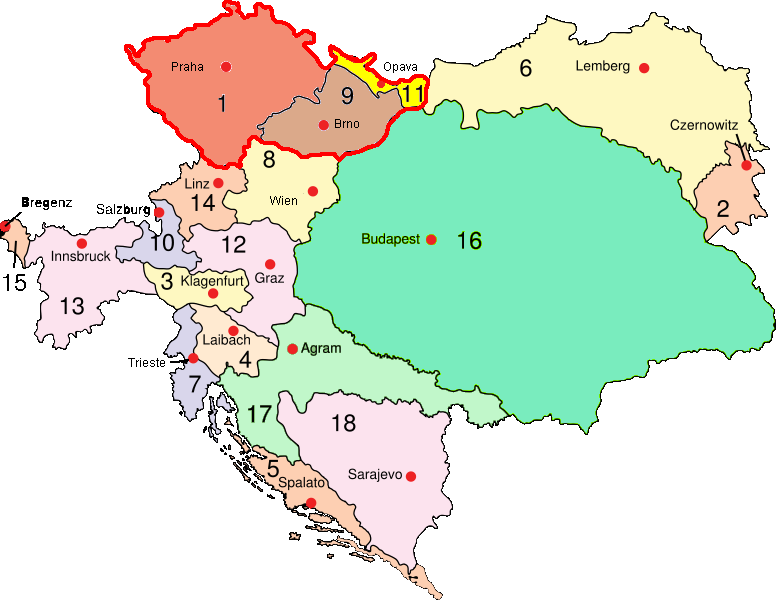
Lands of the Bohemian Crown within Austria-Hungary (1910)

When Vladislas' only son Louis was killed at the Battle of Mohács in 1526, ending the Jagiellon dynasty rule in Bohemia, a convention of Bohemian nobles elected his brother-in-law, the Habsburg archduke Ferdinand I of Austria, as the new king of the Bohemian crown lands. Together with the Archduchy of Austria "hereditary lands" and the Hungarian kingdom, they formed the Habsburg monarchy, which in the following centuries grew out of the Holy Roman Empire into a separate European power. Attempts by the Bohemian Protestant Reformation estates to build up an autonomous confederation were dashed at the 1620 Battle of White Mountain, whereafter the administration was centralised at Vienna. Moreover, the Habsburg rulers lost the Lusatias to the Electorate of Saxony after the Thirty Years' War in the 1635 Peace of Prague, and also most of Silesia with Kladsko to the Kingdom of Prussia after the First Silesian War in the 1742 Treaty of Breslau.

From 1599 to 1711, the border between modern Czech Republic and Slovakia was frequently subjected to raids by the Ottoman Empire and its vassals (especially the Tatars and Transylvania). Overall, hundreds of thousands were enslaved whilst tens of thousands were killed.

In the modern era, the remaining crown lands of Bohemia, Moravia and Austrian Silesia became constituent parts of the Austrian Empire in 1804, and later the Cisleithanian half of Austria-Hungary in 1867.

After World War I and the dissolution of the Austro-Hungarian monarchy, these became the historic regions usually referred to as the Czech lands forming the Czech Republic. Austrian Silesia with the Hlučín Region is today known as Czech Silesia, with the exception of eastern Cieszyn Silesia which passed to the Second Polish Republic in 1920.

== Bohemian territories ==
=== Crown lands ===
Crown land	Type	Map	Capital or important city	Ethnic group	Religion	Notes
Bohemia	Kingdom		Prague	Bohemians (Czechs); Germans	Roman Catholic; Hussite (15th–17th centuries); Anabaptist (15th–17th centuries); Lutheran	Royal dignity first bestowed upon Vratislaus II of Bohemia in 1085, hereditary since 1198 under King Ottokar I; Electorate of the Holy Roman Empire, confirmed by the Golden Bull of 1356. Included the Imperial domain of Egerland (Chebsko), obtained by King Wenceslaus II between 1291–1305, definitely given in pawn to Bohemia by King Louis IV in 1322 and subsequently ruled in personal union with Bohemia proper; as well as the County of Kladsko, established in 1459 and conquered by the Prussian king Frederick the Great in 1742.
Moravia	Margraviate		Olomouc, Brno	Czechs (Moravians); Germans	Roman Catholic; Hussite (15th–17th centuries); Anabaptist (15th–17th centuries); Lutheran	Principalities of Olomouc, Brno and Znojmo, acquired by Přemyslid and Slavník Bohemian rulers after the 955 Battle of Lechfeld, lost in 999 to Poland and reconquered by Duke Bretislaus I in 1035. Elevated to a margraviate by the Přemyslid dukes in 1182, Bohemian fief from 1197.
Silesia	Duchies		Wrocław	Germans; Czechs/Bohemians; Silesians; Poles; Moravians	Roman Catholic; Lutheran	Many various duchies, acquired by the 1335 Treaty of Trentschin between King John of Bohemia and King Casimir III of Poland. The Habsburg queen Maria Theresa lost Silesia in 1742 to the Prussian king Frederick the Great by the Treaty of Breslau, with the exception of its South-East part which became called Austrian Silesia (later Czech Silesia). Today divided between Poland, the Czech Republic, and Germany.
Upper Lusatia	Margraviate		Bautzen	Germans; Sorbs	Roman Catholic; Lutheran	Former Milceni lands of Meissen, finally incorporated by King John of Bohemia in 1319 (Bautzen) and 1329 (Görlitz). The Habsburg emperor Ferdinand II of Habsburg lost the Lusatias to the Electorate of Saxony with the 1635 Peace of Prague. Formally part of the Crown of Bohemia until 1815, today divided between Germany and Poland.
Lower Lusatia	Margraviate		Lübben	Germans; Sorbs	Lutheran	Former March of Lusatia, acquired by Emperor Charles IV from Margrave Otto V of Brandenburg in 1367. The Habsburg emperor Ferdinand II of Habsburg lost the Lusatias to the Electorate of Saxony with the 1635 Peace of Prague. Formally part of the Crown of Bohemia between until 1815, today divided between Germany and Poland.
Görlitz (Zgorzelec)	Duchy		Görlitz	Germans; Sorbs	Roman Catholic	Duchy created by Emperor Charles IV for his third son John of Görlitz; he was the only Duke of Görlitz (Zgorzelec) from 1377 until his death.

=== Other territories ===
Margraviate of Brandenburg

- The Brandenburg Electorate, acquired by Charles IV from Margrave Otto V in 1373. Charles' son Sigismund granted Brandenburg in 1415 to Frederick I, Elector of Brandenburg.
- The adjacent northern part of the Upper Palatinate ("Bohemian Palatinate") at Sulzbach, incorporated by Charles IV in 1355. Charles' son Wenceslaus lost the area in 1401 to the Electoral Palatinate under King Ruprecht of Germany.
- Egerland

== Administrative divisions ==
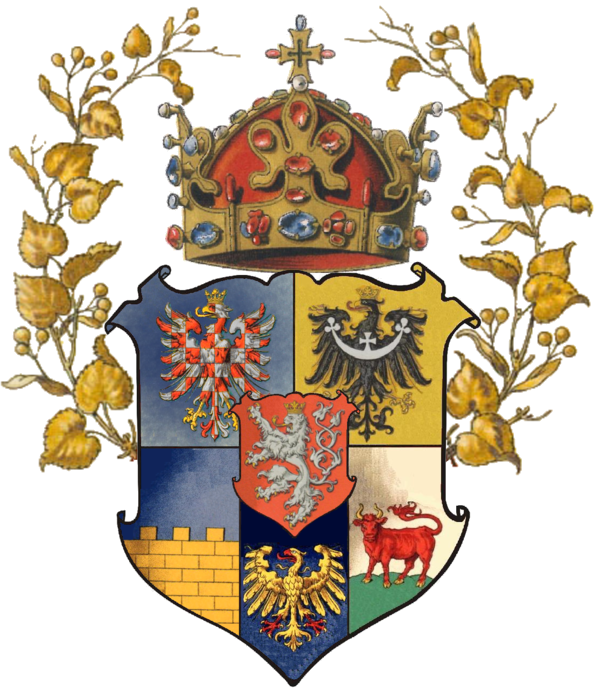
Coat of arms of the Bohemian crown lands (until 1635), clockwise from upper left: Eagle of Moravia, Eagle of Lower Silesia, Ox of Lower Lusatia, Eagle of Upper Silesia, Wall of Upper Lusatia, Bohemian Lion en surtout, under a Crown of Saint Wenceslas, garlanded by lime. Drawn by Hugo Gerard Ströhl (1851–1919).

Kraje of Kingdom of Bohemia

- Bechyně (German: Beching)
- Boleslav (German: Jung-Bunzlau)
- Čáslav (German: Tschaslau)
- Chrudim
- Hradec Králové (German: Königgrätz)
- Kladsko (German: Glatz)
- Kouřim at Prague (German: Prag)
- Litoměřice (German: Leitmeritz)
- Loket (German: Elbogen)
- Vltava (German: Moldau)
- Plzeň (German: Pilsen)
- Podbrdsko at Beroun (German: Beraun)
- Prácheň at Písek
- Rakovník (German: Rakonitz)
- Slaný (German: Schlan)
- Žatec (German: Saaz)

Kraje of Margraviate of Moravia

- Brno (German: Brünn)
- Hradiště (German: Ungarisch Hradisch)
- Jihlava (German: Iglau)
- Olomouc (German: Olmütz)
- Přerov (German: Prerau)
- Znojmo (German: Znaim)

Duchies of Silesia

- Brzeg (Czech: Břeh) (German: Brieg)
- Bytom (Czech: Bytom) (German: Beuthen)
- Cieszyn (Czech: Těšín) (German: Teschen)
- Głogów (Czech: Hlohov) (German: Glogau)
- Jawor (Czech: Javor) (German: Jauer)
- Legnica (Czech: Lehnice) (German: Liegnitz)
- Nysa (Czech: Nisa) (German: Neiße)
- Oleśnica (Czech: Olešnice) (German: Oels)
- Opava (Polish: Opawa) (German: Troppau)
- Opole (Czech: Opolí) (German: Oppeln)
- Pszczyna (Czech: Pština) (German: Pless)
- Racibórz (Czech: Ratiboř) (German: Ratibor)
- Ścinawa (Czech: Stěnava) (German: Steinau)
- Świdnica (Czech: Svídnice) (German: Schweidnitz)
- Wrocław (Czech: Vratislav) (German: Breslau)
- Żagań (Czech: Zaháň) (German: Sagan)
- Ziębice (Czech: Minstrberk) (German: Münsterberg)

Margraviate of Lusatia

- Upper Lusatia at Bautzen
- Lower Lusatia at Lübben

== See also ==
- Czech lands
- History of the Czech lands
- List of rulers of Bohemia
- Lands of the Crown of Saint Stephen
- Crown of the Kingdom of Poland
- Crown of Aragon
- Crown of Castille
- Real union
