= Siege of Plzeň (1433–1434) =

Siege in the Hussite Wars

Coordinates: 49°44′48″N 13°22′46″E

- Part of Hussite Wars
- Upset against Prokop the Great before the besieged Plzeň, by Věnceslav Černý
Date	14 July 1433 – 9 May 1434
Location	Plzeň, Bohemia
Result	Catholic victory

Belligerents
Radical Hussites: Taborites; Orphans; Moderate Hussites: Praguers; Union of Žatec and Louny	Landfrieden of Plzeň

Commanders and leaders
Prokop the Great; Jan Pardus; Ondřej Keřský of Řimovice; Bedřich of Strážnice; Jan Čapek of Sány	William Schwihau von Riesenberg; Theobald of Dolany

Strength
About 13,000	Unknown

Casualties and losses
700–1,000 killed 500–700 captured	Unknown

The siege of Plzeň lasted from 14 July 1433 to 9 May 1434 and was an important encounter of the Hussite Wars. Hussite troops led by Prokop the Great had unsuccessfully besieged the Catholic city of Plzeň for nine months and twenty three days. Failure to capture one of the last major Catholic cities in Bohemia along with the fall of New Town was a huge blow for the Hussite groups that foreshadowed their decisive defeat in the Battle of Lipany.
