= Battle of Aussig =

1426 battle of the Hussite Wars

Coordinates: 50°39′35″N 13°57′53″E

- Part of the Third anti-Hussite crusade, Hussite Wars
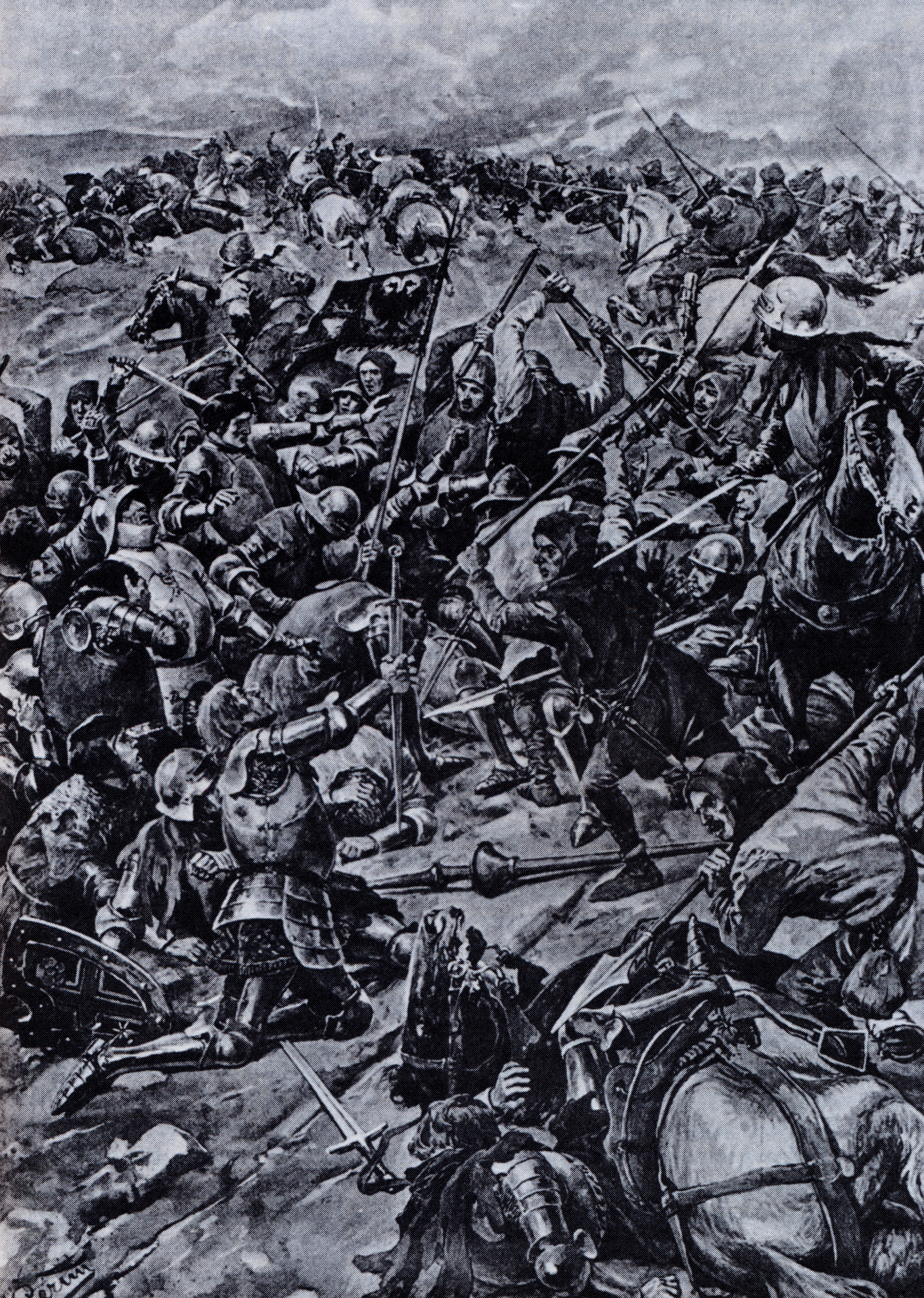
- Battle of Aussig by Věnceslav Černý
Date	16 June 1426
Location	Aussig (Ústí nad Labem)
Result	Hussite victory

Belligerents
Hussite coalition: Praguers; Orphans; Union of Žatec and Louny; Taborites; Bohemian-Moravian Hussite nobility; Grand Duchy of Lithuania	Crusade: Holy Roman Empire; Margraviate of Meissen; Electorate of Saxony; Landgraviate of Thuringia; Upper Lusatia; Landgraviate of Hesse; other crusaders

Commanders and leaders
Sigismund Korybut; Prokop the Great; Jan Roháč z Dubé	Boso of Vitzthum

Strength
11,000; 500 War wagons	13,000

Casualties and losses
19–30 killed 300 wagons	4,000 killed including 14 counts and barons

The Battle of Aussig (German: Schlacht bei Aussig) was fought on 16 June 1426, between Roman Catholic crusaders and the Hussites during the Fourth Crusade of the Hussite Wars. It was fought near Aussig (Ústí nad Labem) in northern Bohemia.

== Background ==
The crusade was called because the Pope believed that the Hussite armies would be easily defeated after the death of Jan Žižka. The overall commander of the Hussite forces at the battle was Sigismund Korybut, while Prokop the Great was independently in command of the Taborites. Boso of Vitzthum was the leader of the crusading army. Medieval chronicles states that Hussites had 24,000 soldiers and at least 500 war wagons, while the crusaders had 36,000 men. However, modern historians suggest that these numbers are largely exaggerated.

== The battle ==
The Hussites drew up their Wagenburg on one of the hills near the town. A crusader cavalry assault on the wagon fortress began the battle. The knights could have been equipped with very large battle axes or hammers because one account of the battle has them hewing through the retaining chains on the wagons to breach through the fortress and get inside the Wagenburg. Then, the knights broke through a second defensive line that was made up of pavises. This was the highest point of crusader morale in the whole battle.

The Hussite cavalry inside the Wagenburg had left and attacked the knights trying to breach the wagon chains from the rear. The knights were then surrounded and fell under a huge barrage of artillery, crossbow, and handgun fire. The Hussites then charged in on the knights and showed no mercy.

== End and aftermath ==
The actual battle was brief, and for that reason, it is possible that no more than 4,000 soldiers were lost on the crusader side. However, after the battle, many of the crusaders fled to nearby villages.
