= Hussite Wars =

15th-century religious wars in Bohemia

- Part of the European religious wars and the Crusades
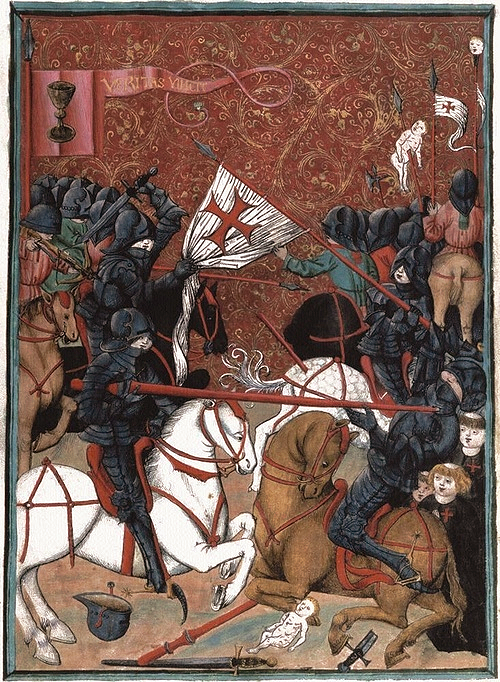
- Battle of Hussites and Catholic crusaders, Jena Codex, 15th century
Date	30 July 1419 – 30 May 1434 (14 Years, 10 Months)
Location	Central Europe, mostly the Lands of the Bohemian Crown with spillovers into Hungary, Poland, and German lands
Result	Victory of the moderate Hussites (Utraquists or Calixtines) and Catholics over the radical Hussites: Compromise between moderate Hussites and the Catholic Church; both join forces to fight the radical Hussites; The moderate Hussites are recognized by the Catholic Church and allowed to practice their own rite; The radical Hussites are defeated, and their rites forbidden; Sigismund of Luxembourg becomes King of Bohemia; The Basel Compacts, signed by Emperor Sigismund and Catholic and Hussite representatives, effectively end the Hussite Wars

Belligerents
Bohemia & Moravia: Hussite movement (Note: The Hussite movement was formed by pilgrims and followers in southern and western Bohemia, Plzeň and in the newly founded town of Tábor.)(1419–20); Hussite Bohemia (Note: The Kingdom of Bohemia under the Hussite movement was controlled by various Hussite unions (factions) led by hetmans (military commanders), the most strongest of which were Taborites, Praguers, Orebites (later Osphans), etc.) (1420–23): Taborites; Praguers (Note: The "Praguers" were a Hussite union in central Bohemia and centered in the capital city of Prague.); Orebites (Note: The Orebites were a Hussite union in Eastern Bohemia.); Union of Žatec and Louny (Note: The Hussites of Žatec and Louny were a union in Northern Bohemia.); Bohemian Hussite nobility and cities; Moravian Hussites: Moravian Hussite nobility; New Tábor (1420–21); Radical Hussite faction (1423–34): Taborites; Orebites (until 1424); Orphans (since 1424) (Note: The Orebites renamed themselves "Orphans" (Sirotci) after Žižka's death (1424).); Allies: Lithuania (Note: Lithuania supported the Hussite revolution in the hope of receiving the Bohemian royal crown for itself. For this purpose the Lithuanian duke Sigismund Korybut came to Bohemia and was designed by the Hussites as their additional hetman (military commander).); Supported by: Poland Polish–Hussite invasion of Prussia (1433): Poland; Pomerania-Stolp; Orphans as mercenaries Poland: Polish Hussites	Crusaders and Catholic loyalists: Hungary-Croatia (Note: Hungary and Croatia were in a personal union. Sigismund of Luxembourg was the king of Hungary and at the same time the king of Croatia.): Cumans (Note: The Cumans (or Kumans) were a Turkic nation settled on Hungarian territory (Kunság), where were incorporated into Hungarian forces as mercenaries. During the invasion they were characterized by cruelty to civilians and increased plundering of villages.); Holy Roman Empire (also German Kingdom (Note: Sigismund of Luxembourg was crowned Holy Roman Emperor in 1433. Until that, he had invaded Bohemia as the king of Germany and the king of Hungary.)): Bohemian Crown; Landfrieden of Plzeň (Note: The Landfrieden of Plzeň remained the major power of the Bohemian loyalists and Catholicism of the entire Kingdom of Bohemia.); Bohemian Catholic nobility and cities; German Bohemians (Note: Hussitism spread especially among the Czech-speaking people, while the Bohemian Germans remained loyal to the Catholic Church and Emperor Sigismund. In some cases, German burghers took part in a defense of city during a Hussite siege. This seriously caused hostility between the Slavic Czechs and the German population of Bohemia.); Moravia; Olomouc; Silesian duchies; Oels; Nysa; Oława; Świdnica; Münsterberg; Żagań; Wrocław; Troppau; Upper Lusatia; Lower Lusatia; Egerland; Kladsko; Meissen (until 1423); Saxony (since 1423); Austria; Palatinate; Brandenburg; Bavaria-Landshut; Trier; Cologne; Mainz; Thuringia; Hesse; Würzburg; Brunswick-Lüneburg; Swabian cities; Free imperial cities (several participated); Various mercenaries and crusaders; Teutonic Order; Order of Rhodes; Papal States; England (Note: Participated in the Third anti-Hussite Crusade under the leadership of Henry Beaufort.); Serbia; Poland (Note: The Poles supported the Czech Hussites in their efforts, except when Hussitism spread to Poland. The Polish Hussites were defeated in the battle of Grotniki (1439).); Allies: Moderate Hussite faction (since 1423): Praguers; Bohemian Hussite nobility; Split taborite group: Radical Picards/Neo-Adamites (Note: Considered and persecuted by Hussites as heretics. Adam de Rohan, a famed Adamite leader involved against Jan Žižka, along with others, perhaps survived the wars and then lived in secret.)

Commanders and leaders
Jan Žižka #; Prokop the Great †; Prokop the Lesser †; Jan Želivský (executed); Jan Čapek of Sány; Diviš Bořek of Miletínek (1420–23); Hynek Krušina of Lichtenburg; Jakoubek of Vřesovice; Jan Roháč of Dubá; Bohuslav von Schwanberg (1422–25) †; Čeněk of Wartenberg; Sigismund Korybut; Jan Tovačovský of Cimburk; Hanuš of Kolowrat †; Aleš Vřešťovský of Rýzmburk; Chval Řepický of Machovice; Jan Pardus of Horka and Vratkov; Mikuláš of Hus †; Ondřej Keřský of Řimovice †; Petr Zmrzlík of Svojšín; Jan Talafús of Ostrov; Kuneš of Bělovice; Bedřich of Strážnice; Jan Hvězda of Vícemilice; Ojíř of Očedělice; Jan Královec; Petr Hromádka; Mikuláš Sokol; Racek Kobyla; Allies of the Polish–Hussite invasion of Prussia: Mikuláš of Michalów; Sudivoj of Ostroróg; Bogislav IX of Słupsk; Supporters: Vladislaus II; Spytko III of Melsztyn	Sigismund; Pope Martin V; Pippo Spano; Ulrich II of Rosenberg; Bohuslav of Schwanberg (1419–22); Čeněk of Wartenberg; Jan Všembera of Boskovice; Peter of Sternberg; Mikeš Divůček of Jemniště; Henry of Kravaře and Plumlov †; Hanuš of Kolowrat †; Hynce Ptáček of Pirkstein; Hynčík Pflug of Rabstein; Henry of Hradec (DOW); Rupert II of Lubin; John XII of Bucka; William Schwihau von Riesenberg; Theobald of Dolany; Konrad IV the Elder; Přemek of Opava; Půta III of Častolovice; Louis of Oława; John of Münsterberg; John of Żagań; Těma of Koldice; Albert of Koldice; Hanuš of Polensko; Frederick I; Boso of Vitzthum; Frederick II of Saxony; Louis III; Frederick of Brandenburg; Johann of Pfalz-Neumarkt; Albert II of Austria; Reinprecht of Walsee; Julian Cesarini; Otto of Ziegenheim; Đurađ Branković; Scibor II. Sciborowic; Michael Országh; Henry Beaufort; William the Victorious; Erasmus Fischborn; Paul von Rusdorf; Hińcza of Rogów; Zbigniew Oleśnicki; Diviš Bořek of Miletínek (since 1423); Picard/Adamite Adam de Rohan

The Hussite Wars, also called the Bohemian Wars or the Hussite Revolution, were a series of civil wars fought between the Hussites and the combined Catholic forces of Holy Roman Emperor Sigismund, the Papacy, and European monarchs loyal to the Roman Catholic Church, as well as various Hussite factions. At a late stage of the conflict, the Utraquists changed sides in 1432 to fight alongside Roman Catholics and opposed the Taborites and other Hussite factions. These wars lasted from 1419 to approximately 1434.

The unrest began after proto-Protestant Christian reformer Jan Hus was executed by the Catholic Church in 1415 for heresy. Because Sigismund had plans to be crowned the Holy Roman Emperor (requiring papal coronation), he suppressed the religion of the Hussites, yet it continued to spread. When King Wenceslaus IV of Bohemia, brother of Sigismund, died of natural causes a few years later, the tension stemming from the Hussites grew stronger. In Prague and various other parts of Bohemia, the Catholic Germans living there were forced out.

Wenceslaus's brother, Sigismund, who had inherited the throne, was outraged by the spread of Hussitism. He received permission from the pope to launch a crusade against the Hussites, and large numbers of crusaders came from all over Europe to fight; they made early advances, forcing the Hussites back and taking Prague. However, the Hussites reorganized and took back nearly all the land they had lost, resulting in the failure of the crusade.

After the reins of the Hussite army were handed over to yeoman Jan Žižka, internal strife followed. Seeing that the Hussites were weakened, the Germans undertook another crusade but were defeated by Žižka at the Battle of Německý Brod. Three more crusades were attempted by the papacy, but none achieved their objectives. The Lithuanians and Poles did not wish to attack the Czechs, Germany was having internal conflicts and could not muster up a sufficient force to battle the Hussites, and the king of Denmark left the Czech border to go back to his home. As the conflicts went on, the Hussites also made raids into German territory.

The wars eventually ended in 1434 when the moderate Utraquist faction of the Hussites defeated the radical Taborite faction. The Hussites agreed to submit to the authority of the king of Bohemia and the Roman Catholic Church and were allowed to practice their somewhat variant rite.

The Hussite community included much of the Czech population of the Kingdom of Bohemia and formed a major spontaneous military power. The Hussite Wars were notable for the extensive use of early handheld firearms such as hand cannons and of wagon forts by the Hussites.

== Origins ==
Starting around 1402, priest and scholar Jan Hus denounced what he judged as the corruption of the church and the papacy, and he promoted some of the reformist ideas of English theologian John Wycliffe. His preaching was widely heeded in Bohemia, and provoked suppression by the church, which had declared many of Wycliffe's ideas heretical. In 1411, in the course of the Western Schism, "Antipope" John XXIII proclaimed a "crusade" against King Ladislaus of Naples, the protector of rival Pope Gregory XII. To raise money for this, he proclaimed indulgences in Bohemia. Hus bitterly denounced this and explicitly quoted Wycliffe against it, provoking further complaints of heresy but winning much support in Bohemia.

In 1414, Sigismund of Hungary convened the Council of Constance to end the Schism and resolve other religious controversies. Hus went to the Council, under a safe-conduct from Sigismund, but was imprisoned, tried, and executed on 6 July 1415. The knights and nobles of Bohemia and Moravia, who were in favour of church reform, sent the protestatio Bohemorum to the Council of Constance on 2 September 1415, which condemned the execution of Hus in the strongest language. This angered Sigismund, who was "King of the Romans" (head of the Holy Roman Empire, though not yet Emperor) and brother of King Wenceslaus of Bohemia. He had been persuaded by the Council that Hus was a heretic. He sent threatening letters to Bohemia declaring that he would shortly drown all Wycliffites and Hussites, greatly incensing the people.

Disorder broke out in various parts of Bohemia and drove many Catholic priests from their parishes. Almost from the beginning, the Hussites were divided into two main groups, though many minor divisions also arose among them. Shortly before his death, Hus had accepted the doctrine of Utraquism preached during his absence by his adherents at Prague: the obligation of the faithful to receive communion in both kinds, bread and wine (sub utraque specie). This doctrine became the watchword of the moderate Hussites known as the Utraquists or Calixtines, from the Latin calix (the chalice), in Czech Kališníci (from kalich). The more extreme Hussites became known as Taborites (Táborité), after the town of Tábor, which became their centre; or Orphans (Sirotci), a name they adopted after the death of their leader and general Jan Žižka.

Under the influence of Sigismund, Wenceslaus endeavoured to stem the Hussite movement. A number of Hussites led by Mikuláš of Hus left Prague. They held meetings in various parts of Bohemia, particularly at Sezimovo Ústí, near the spot where the town of Tábor was founded soon afterwards. At these meetings, they violently denounced Sigismund, and the people everywhere prepared for war.

In spite of the departure of many prominent Hussites, the troubles at Prague continued. On 30 July 1419, a Hussite procession headed by the priest Jan Želivský attacked New Town Hall in Prague and threw the king's representatives, the burgomaster, and some town councillors from the windows into the street (the first "Defenestration of Prague"), where several were killed by the fall, after a rock was allegedly thrown from the town hall and hit Želivský. It has been suggested that Wenceslaus was so stunned by the defenestration that it caused his death on 16 August 1419. Alternatively, it is possible that he may have just died of natural causes.

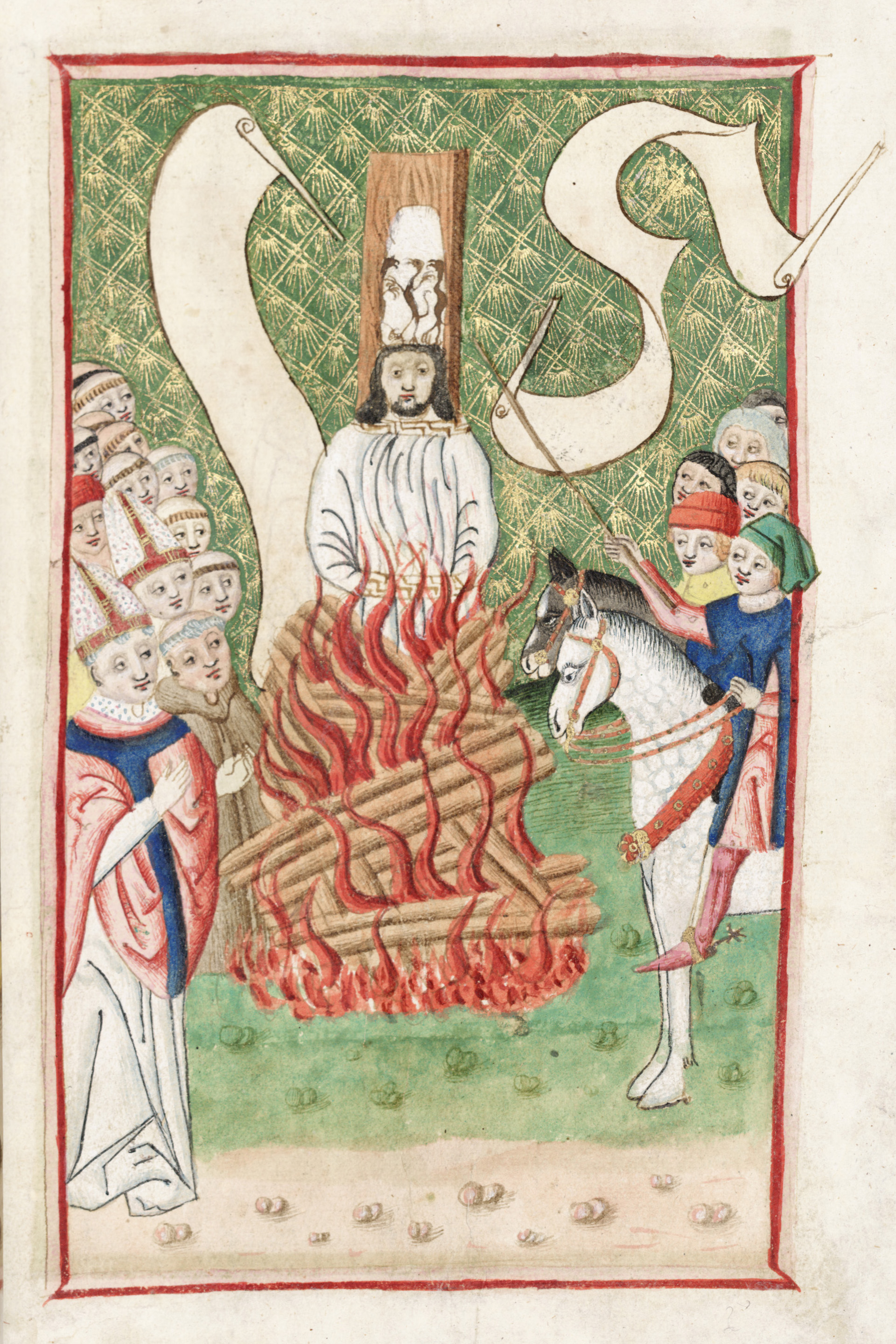
Burning of Jan Hus at the Council of Constance, Jena Codex, 15th century

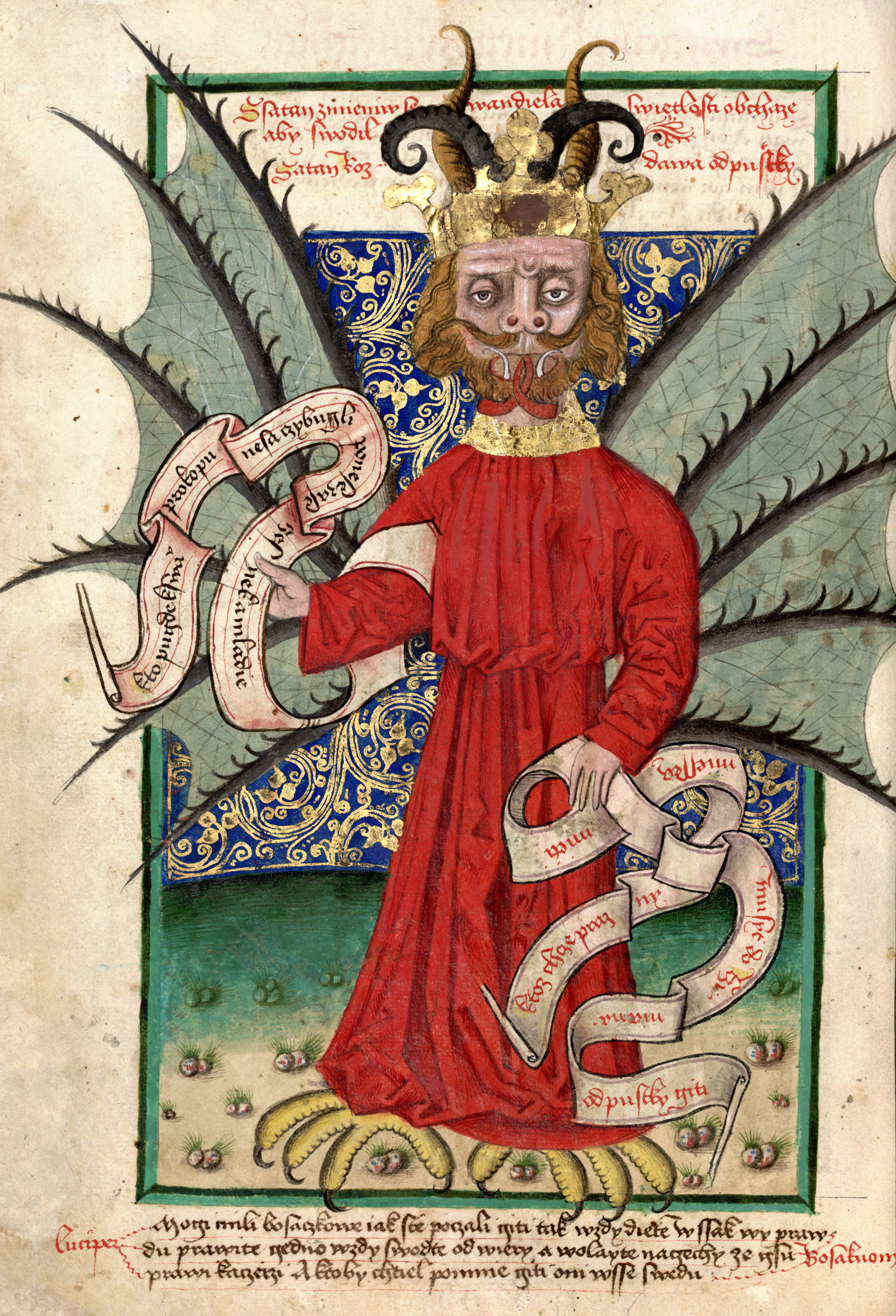
The devil is selling indulgences, Jena Codex

== Outbreak of fighting ==
The death of Wenceslaus resulted in renewed troubles in Prague and in almost all parts of Bohemia. Many Catholics, mostly Germans—mostly still faithful to the Pope—were expelled from the Bohemian cities. Wenceslaus's widow Sophia of Bavaria, acting as regent in Bohemia, hurriedly collected a force of mercenaries and tried to gain control of Prague, which led to severe fighting. After a considerable part of the city had been damaged or destroyed, the parties declared a truce on 13 November. The nobles, sympathetic to the Hussite cause, but supporting the regent, promised to act as mediators with Sigismund, while the citizens of Prague consented to restore to the royal forces the castle of Vyšehrad, which had fallen into their hands. Žižka, who disapproved of this compromise, left Prague and retired to Plzeň. Unable to maintain himself there he marched to southern Bohemia. He defeated the Catholics at the Battle of Sudoměř (25 March 1420), the first pitched battle of the Hussite Wars. After Sudoměř, he moved to Ústí, one of the earliest meeting places of the Hussites. Not considering its situation sufficiently strong, he moved to the neighboring new settlement of the Hussites, called by the biblical name of Tábor.

Tábor soon became the center of the most militant Hussites, who differed from the Utraquists by recognizing only two sacraments—Baptism and Communion—and by rejecting most of the ceremony of the Roman Catholic Church. The ecclesiastical organization of Tabor had a somewhat puritanical character, and the government was established on a thoroughly democratic basis. Four captains of the people (hejtmané) were elected, one of whom was Žižka, and a very strict military discipline was instituted.

== Use of war wagons and firearms ==
Late 14th and early 15th century saw gradually increasing use of firearms in siege operations both by defenders and attackers. Weight, lack of accuracy and cumbersome use of early types limited their employment to static operations and prevented wider use in open battlefield or by civilian individuals. Nevertheless, lack of guild monopolies and low training requirements led to their relatively low price. This together with high effectiveness against armour led to their popularity for castle and town defenses.

When the Hussite revolt started in 1419, the Hussite militias heavily depended on converted farm equipment and weapons looted from castle and town armories, including early firearms. Hussite militia comprised mostly commoners without prior military experience and included both men and women. Use of crossbows and firearms became critical as those weapons didn't require extensive training, nor did their effectiveness rely on the operator's physical strength.

Firearms were first used in the field as a provisional last resort together with wagon forts. Significantly outnumbered Hussite militia led by Jan Žižka repulsed surprise assaults by heavy cavalry during the Battle of Nekmíř in December 1419 and the Battle of Sudoměř in March 1420. In these battles, Žižka employed transport carriages as wagon forts to stop the enemy's cavalry charge. The main weight of the fighting rested on militiamen armed with cold weapons, but firearms shooting from behind the safety of the wagon forts proved to be very effective. Following this experience, Žižka ordered mass manufacturing of war wagons according to a universal template as well as manufacturing of new types of firearms that would be more suitable for use in the open battlefield.

Throughout 1420 and most of 1421, the Hussite tactical use of wagon forts and firearms was defensive. The wagon's wall was stationary, and firearms were used to break the initial charge of the enemy. After this, firearms played an auxiliary role, supporting mainly cold weapons-based defense at the level of the wagon wall. Counterattacks were done by cold weapons-armed infantry and cavalry charges outside of the wagon forts.

The first mobile use of war wagons and firearms took place during the Hussite breakthrough of Catholic encirclement at Vladař Hill in November 1421 at the Battle of Žlutice. The wagons and firearms were used on the move, at this point still only defensively. Žižka avoided the main camp of the enemy and employed the moving wagon forts in order to cover his retreating troops.

The first true engagement where firearms played primary role happened a month later during the Battle of Kutná Hora. Žižka positioned his forces between the town of Kutná Hora, which pledged allegiance to the Hussite cause, and the main camp of the enemy, leaving supplies in the well-defended town. However uprising of ethnic German townsmen led the town into Crusader's control.

Late in the night between 21 and 22 December 1421, Žižka ordered an attack against the enemy's main camp. The attack was conducted by using a gradually moving wagon wall. Instead of the usual infantry raids beyond the wagons, the attack relied mainly on the use of ranged weapons from the moving wagons. Nighttime use of firearms proved extremely effective, not only practically but also psychologically.

The year 1421 marked not only a shift in the importance of firearms, from auxiliary to primary weapons of Hussite militia, but also the establishment of the Čáslav diet of formal legal duty for all inhabitants to obey the call to arms of the elected provisional government. For the first time in medieval European history, this was not put in place in order to fulfill duties to a feudal lord or to the church, but in order to participate in the defense of the country.

Firearms design underwent fast development during the Hussite Wars, and their civilian possession became a matter of course throughout the war as well as after its end in 1434. The word used for one type of handheld firearm used by the Hussites, Czech: píšťala, later found its way through German and French into English as the term "pistol". The name of a cannon used by the Hussites, the Czech: houfnice, gave rise to the English term, "howitzer" (houf meaning "crowd" for its intended use of shooting stone and iron shots against mass enemy forces). Other types of firearms commonly used by the Hussites included hákovnice, an infantry weapon heavier than píšťala and tarasnice (fauconneau). As regards cannons, apart from houfnice, Hussites employed bombarda (mortar) and dělo (cannon).

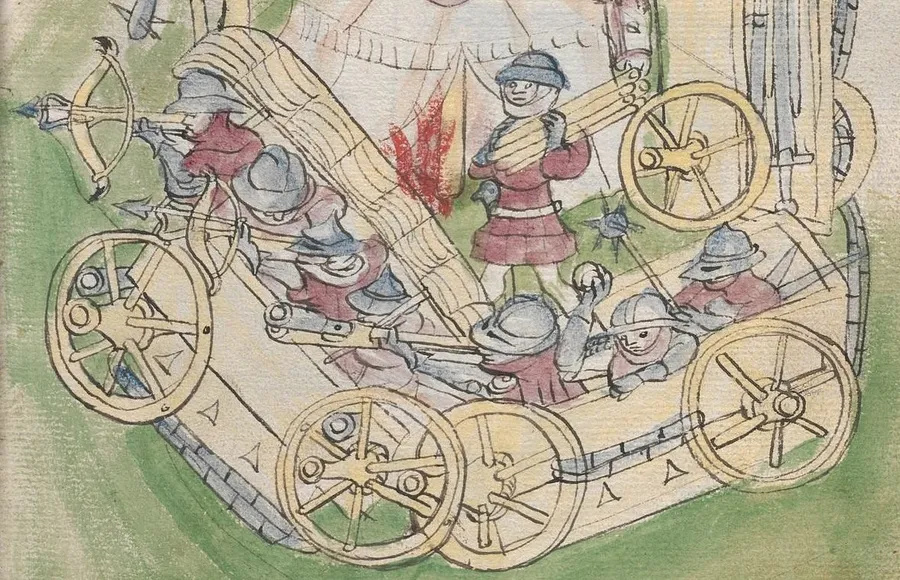
The Hussite Wagenburg

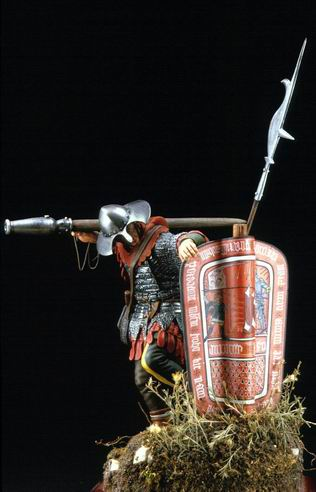
A model of a Hussite warrior behind a Pavise shield, carrying a píšťala on his arm

== First Anti-Hussite crusade ==
After the death of his childless brother Wenceslaus, Sigismund inherited a claim on the Bohemian crown, though it was then, and remained until much later, in question whether Bohemia was a hereditary or an elective monarchy, especially since the line through which Sigismund claimed the throne had accepted that the Kingdom of Bohemia was an elective monarchy elected by the nobles, and thus, the regent of the kingdom (Čeněk of Wartenberg) also explicitly stated that Sigismund had not been elected as a reason for Sigismund's claim to not be accepted. A firm adherent of the Church of Rome, Sigismund was aided by Pope Martin V, who issued a bull on 17 March 1420 proclaiming a crusade "for the destruction of the Wycliffites, Hussites and all other heretics in Bohemia". Sigismund and many German princes arrived before Prague on 30 June at the head of a vast army of crusaders from all parts of Europe, largely consisting of adventurers attracted by the hope of pillage. They immediately began a siege of the city, which had, however, soon to be abandoned. Negotiations took place for a settlement of the religious differences.

The united Hussites formulated their demands in a statement known as the "Four Articles of Prague". This document, the most important of the Hussite period, ran, in the wording of the contemporary chronicler, Laurence of Brezova, as follows:

1. The word of God shall be preached and made known in the kingdom of Bohemia freely and in an orderly manner by the priests of the Lord.

2. The sacrament of the most Holy Eucharist shall be freely administered in the two kinds, that is bread and wine, to all the faithful in Christ who are not precluded by mortal sin – according to the word and disposition of Our Saviour.

3. The secular power over riches and worldly goods which the clergy possesses in contradiction to Christ's precept, to the prejudice of its office and to the detriment of the secular arm, shall be taken and withdrawn from it, and the clergy itself shall be brought back to the evangelical rule and an apostolic life such as that which Christ and his apostles led.

4. All mortal sins, and in particular all public and other disorders, which are contrary to God's law shall in every rank of life be duly and judiciously prohibited and destroyed by those whose office it is.

These articles, which contain the essence of the Hussite doctrine, were rejected by King Sigismund, mainly through the influence of the papal legates, who considered them prejudicial to the authority of the pope. Hostilities therefore continued. However, Sigismund was defeated at the Battle of Vítkov Hill in July 1420.

Though Sigismund had retired from Prague, his troops held the castles of Vyšehrad and Hradčany. The citizens of Prague laid siege to Vyšehrad (see Battle of Vyšehrad), and towards the end of October 1420 the garrison was on the point of capitulating through famine. Sigismund tried to relieve the fortress but was decisively defeated by the Hussites on 1 November near the village of Pankrác. The castles of Vyšehrad and Hradčany now capitulated, and shortly afterwards, almost all Bohemia fell into the hands of the Hussites.

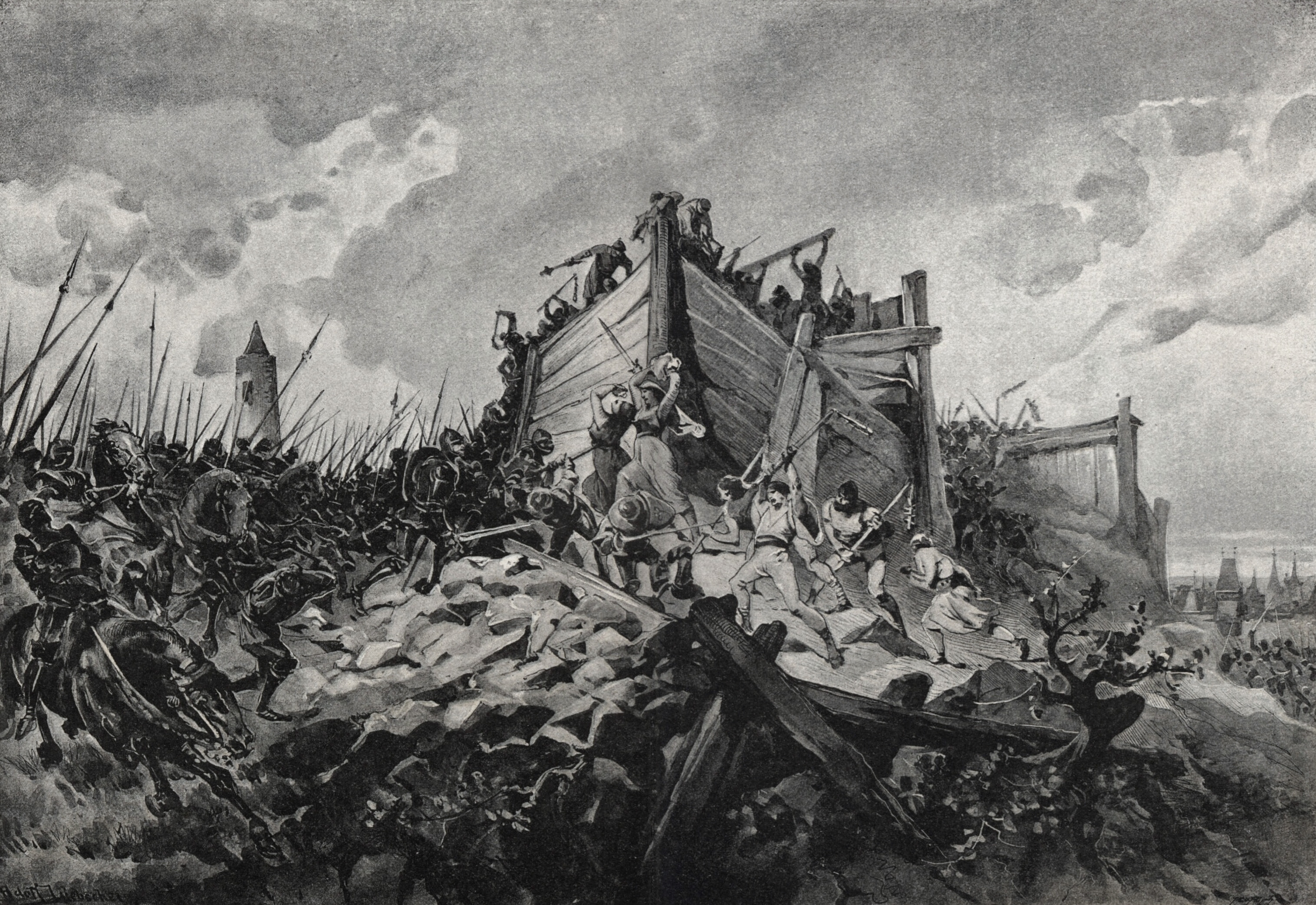
Battle of Vítkov Hill

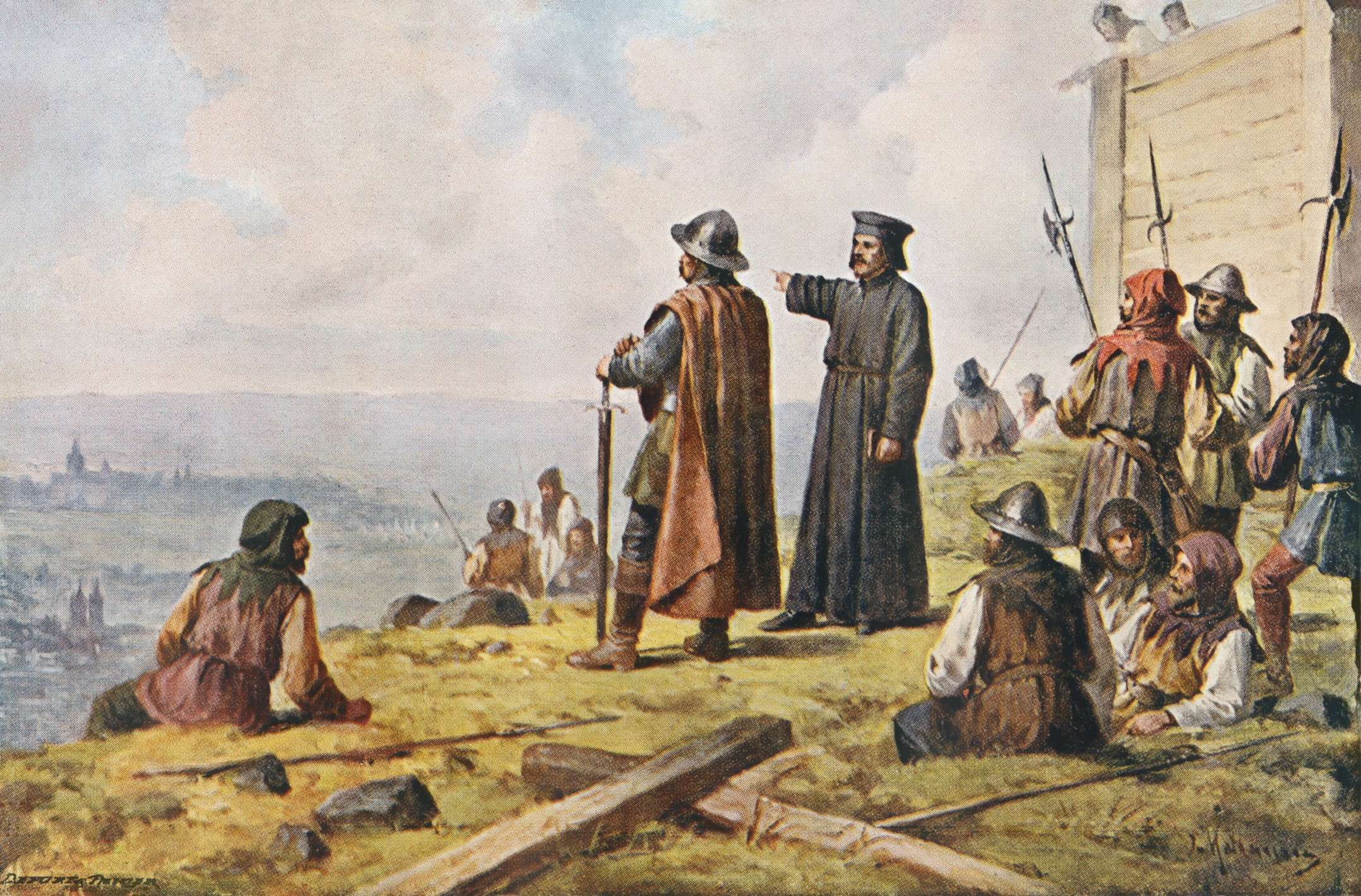
Jan Žižka with a Hussite priest looking over Prague after the Battle of Vítkov Hill

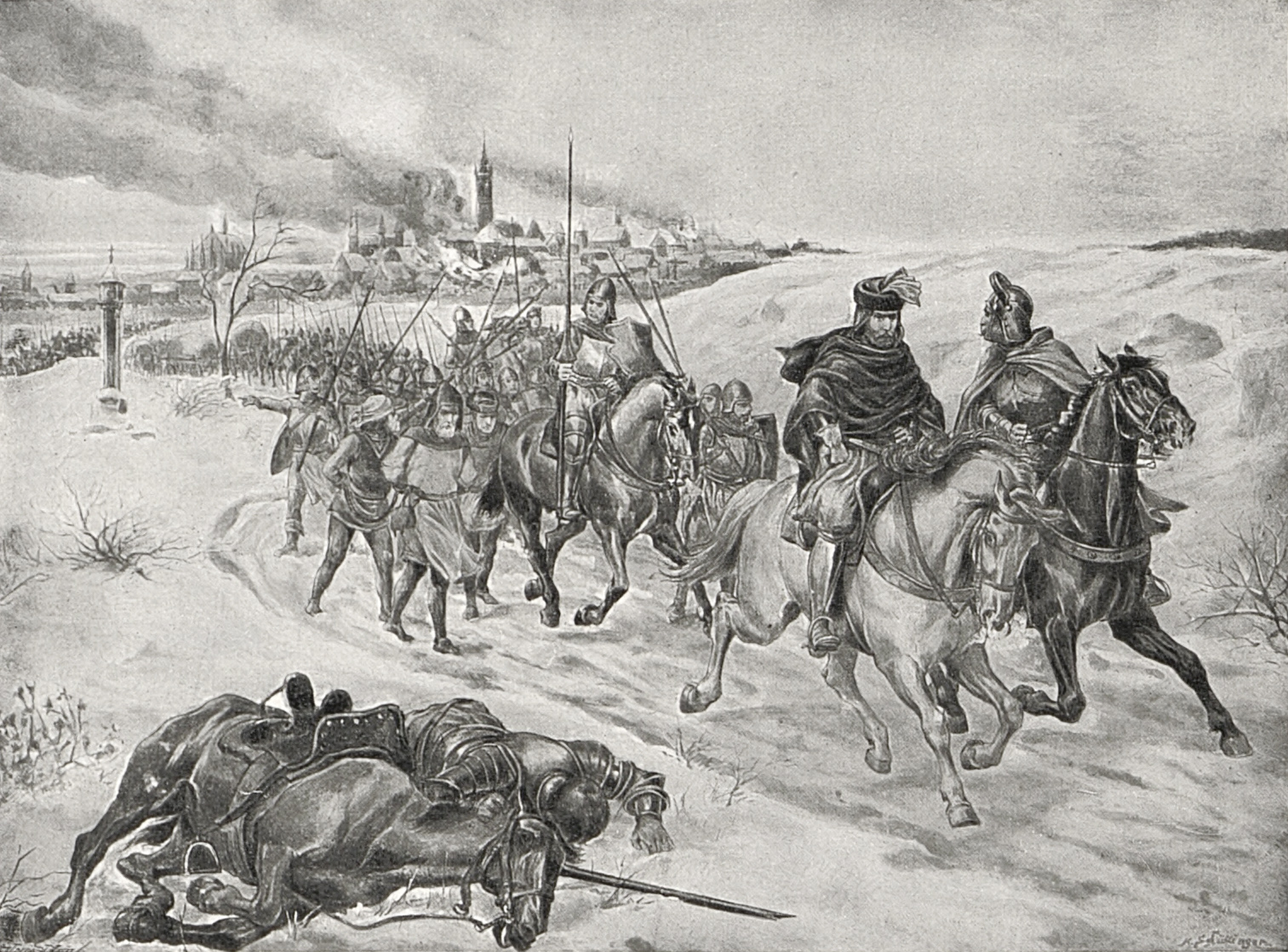
Escape of King Sigismund from Kutná Hora

== Second anti-Hussite crusade ==
Internal troubles prevented the followers of Hus from fully capitalizing on their victory. At Prague, a demagogue, the priest Jan Želivský, for a time obtained almost unlimited authority over the lower classes of the townsmen, and at Tábor, a religious communistic movement (that of the so-called Adamites) was sternly suppressed by Žižka. Shortly afterwards, a new crusade against the Hussites was undertaken. A large German army entered Bohemia and in August 1421 laid siege to the town of Žatec. After an unsuccessful attempt of storming the city, the crusaders retreated somewhat ingloriously on hearing that the Hussite troops were approaching. Sigismund only arrived in Bohemia at the end of 1421. He took possession of the town of Kutná Hora but was decisively defeated by Jan Žižka at the Battle of Německý Brod on 6 January 1422.

== Bohemian civil war ==
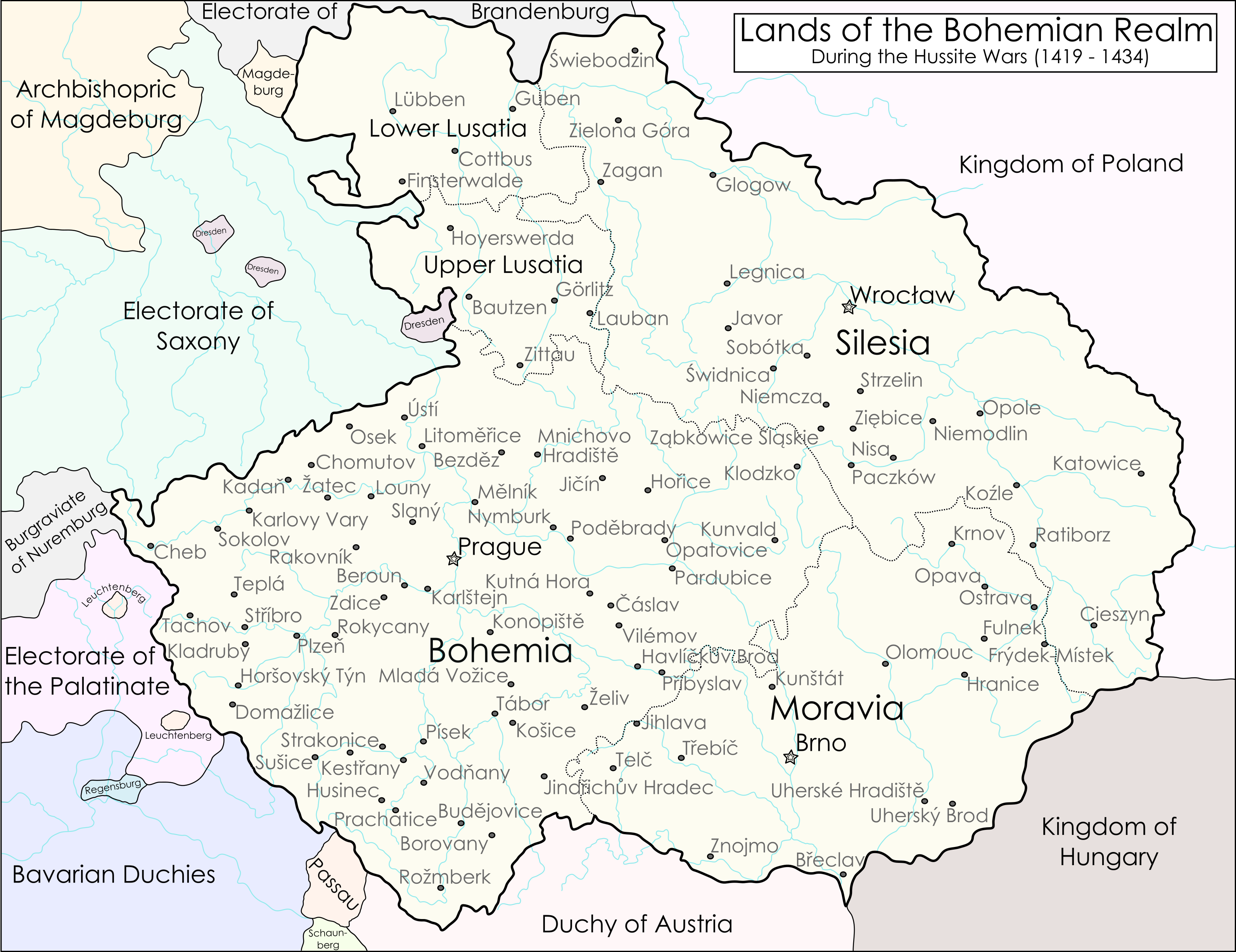
Lands of the Bohemian Crown during the Hussite Wars

Bohemia was for a time free from foreign intervention, but internal discord again broke out, caused partly by theological strife and partly by the ambition of agitators. On 9 March 1422, Jan Želivský was arrested by the town council of Prague and beheaded. There were troubles at Tábor also, where a more radical party opposed Žižka's authority.

== Polish and Lithuanian involvement ==
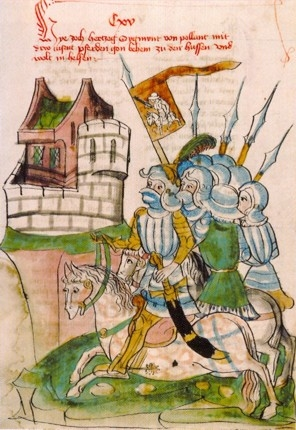
Sigismund Korybut

The Hussites were aided at various times by Poland. Because of this, Jan Žižka arranged for the crown of Bohemia to be offered to King Władysław II Jagiełło of Poland, who, under pressure from his own advisors, refused it. The crown was then offered to Władysław's cousin, Vytautas, the Grand Duke of Lithuania. Vytautas accepted it, with the condition that the Hussites reunite with the Catholic Church. In 1422, Žižka accepted Prince Sigismund Korybut of Lithuania (nephew of Władysław II) as regent of Bohemia for Vytautas.

His authority was recognized by the Utraquist nobles, the citizens of Prague, and the more moderate of the Taborites, but he failed to bring the Hussites back into the church. On a few occasions, he fought against both the Taborites and the Orebites to try to force them into reuniting. After Władysław II and Vytautas signed the Treaty of Melno with Sigismund of Hungary in 1423, they recalled Sigismund Korybut to Lithuania, under pressure from Sigismund of Hungary and the pope.

On his departure, civil war broke out, the Taborites opposing in arms the more moderate Utraquists, who at this period are also called by the chroniclers the "Praguers", as Prague was their principal stronghold. On 27 April 1423, Žižka now again leading, the Taborites defeated the Utraquist army under Čeněk of Wartenberg at the Battle of Hořice; shortly afterwards an armistice was concluded at Konopilt.

== Third anti-Hussite crusade ==
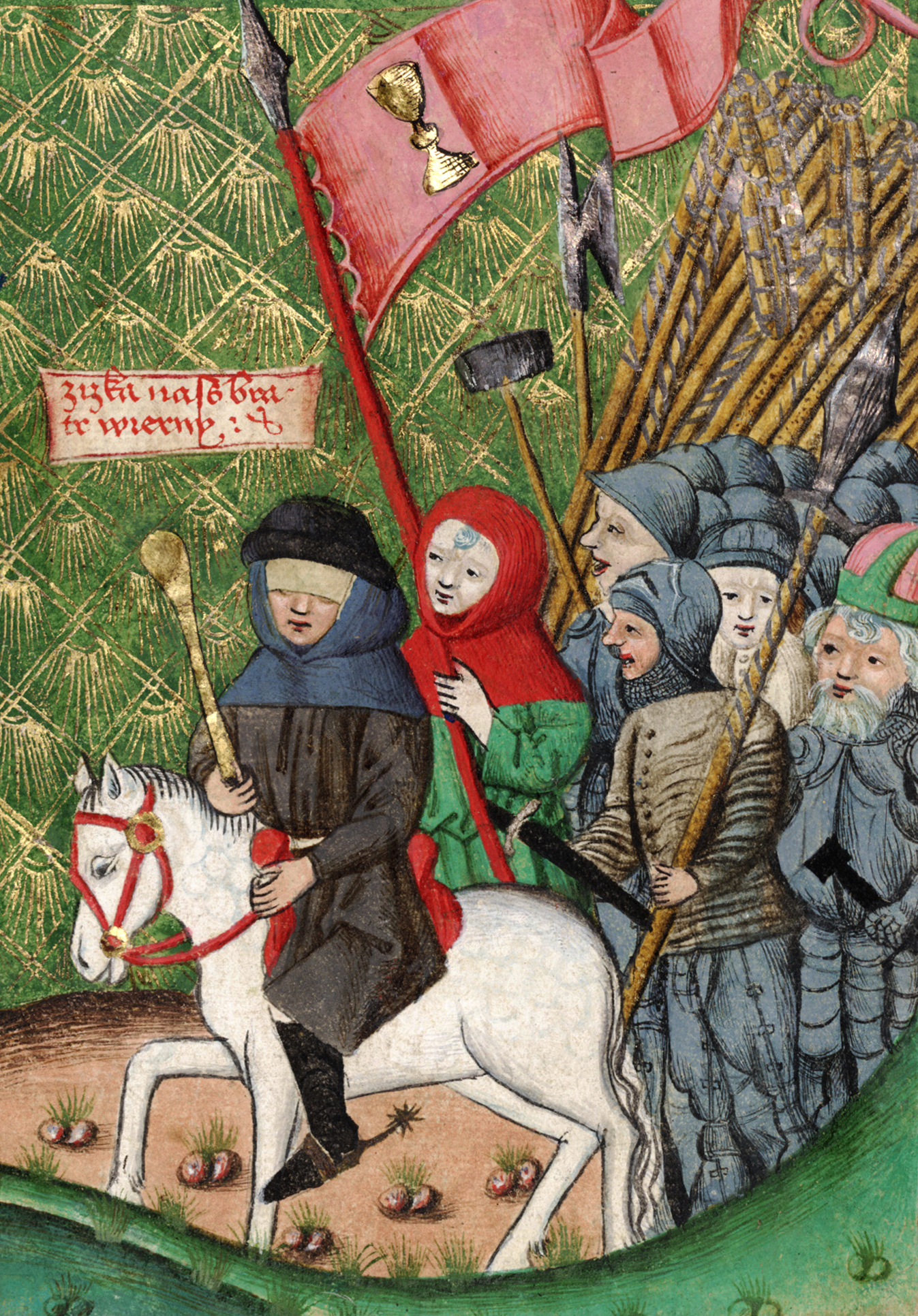
Jan Žižka leading troops of Radical Hussites, Jena Codex, 15th century

Papal influence had succeeded in calling forth a new crusade against Bohemia, but it resulted in complete failure. In spite of the endeavours of their rulers, Poles and Lithuanians did not wish to attack the kindred Czechs; the Germans were prevented by internal discord from taking joint action against the Hussites; and King Eric VII of Denmark, who had landed in Germany with a large force intending to take part in the crusade, soon returned to his own country. Free for a time from foreign threat, the Hussites invaded Moravia, where a large part of the population favored their creed, but paralysed again by dissensions, they soon returned to Bohemia.

The city of Hradec Králové, which had been under Utraquist rule, espoused the doctrine of Tábor and called Žižka to its aid. After several military successes gained by Žižka in 1423 and the following year, a treaty of peace between the Hussite factions was concluded on 13 September 1424 at Libeň, a village near Prague (now part of that city).

Sigismund Korybut, who had returned to Bohemia in 1424 with 1,500 troops, helped broker this peace. After Žižka's death in October 1424, Prokop the Great took command of the Taborites. Korybut, who had come in defiance of Władysław II and Vytautas, also became a Hussite leader.

== Fourth anti-Hussite crusade ==
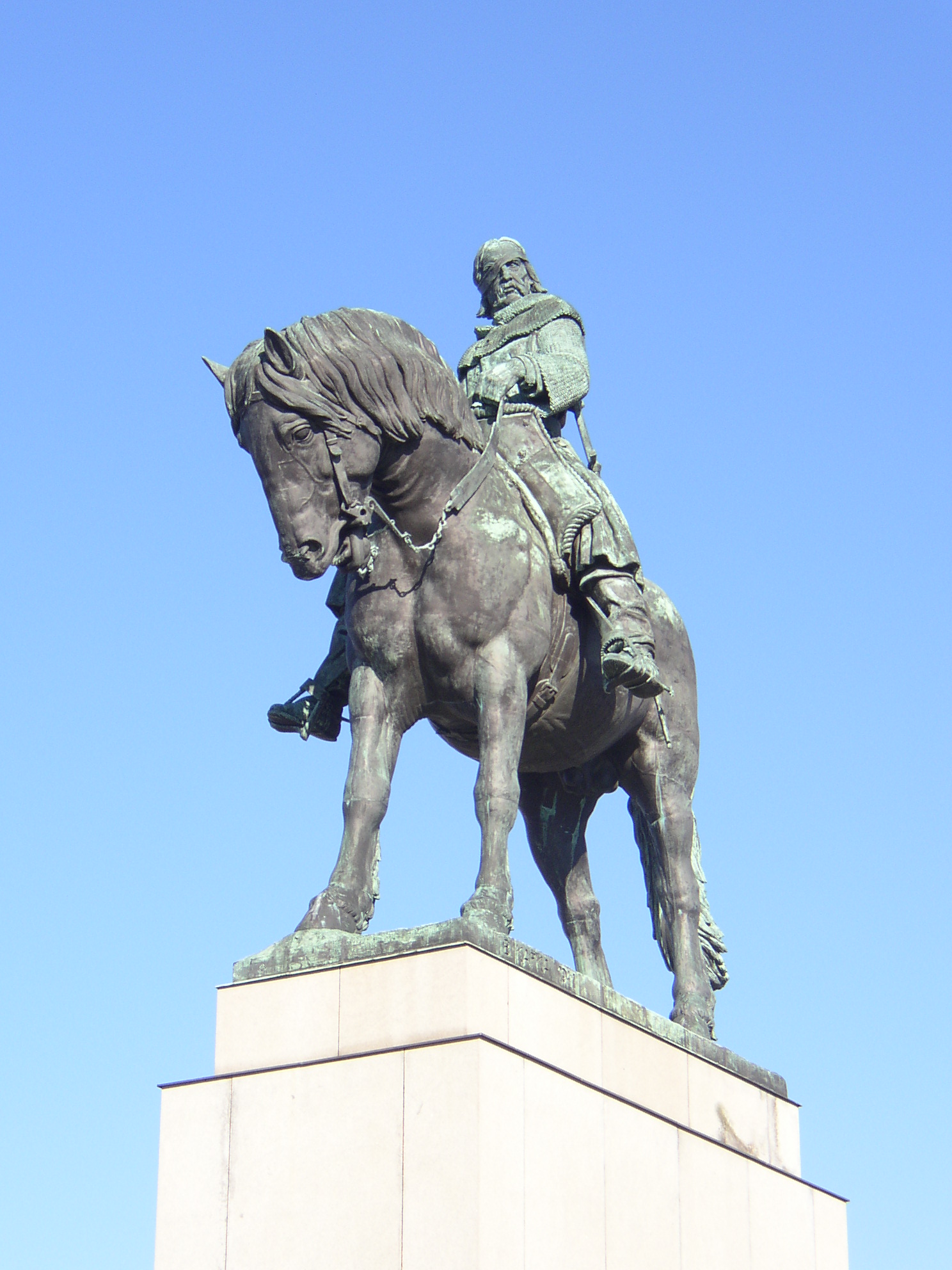
Statue of Jan Žižka on Vítkov Hill

In 1426, the Hussites were attacked again by foreign enemies. In June 1426, Hussite forces, led by Prokop and Sigismund Korybut, significantly defeated the invaders in the Battle of Aussig.

Despite this result, the death of Jan Žižka caused many, including Pope Martin V, to believe that the Hussites were much weakened. Martin proclaimed yet another crusade in 1427. He appointed Cardinal Henry Beaufort of England as the papal legate of Germany, Hungary, and Bohemia, to lead the crusader forces. The crusaders were defeated at the Battle of Tachov.

The Hussites invaded parts of Germany several times, but they made no attempt to occupy permanently any part of the country.

Korybut was imprisoned in 1427 for allegedly conspiring to surrender the Hussite forces to Sigismund of Hungary. He was released in 1428 and participated in the Hussite invasion of Silesia.

After a few years, Korybut returned to Poland with his men. Korybut and his Poles did not really want to leave, but the pope threatened to call a crusade against Poland if they did not.

== Glorious rides ==
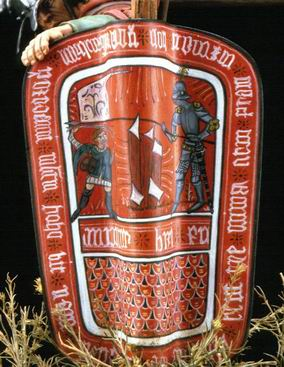
Miniature re-creation of Hussite pavise from an original in the Museum of Prague

During the Hussite Wars, the Hussites launched raids against many bordering countries. The Hussites called them Spanilé jízdy ("glorious rides"). Especially under the leadership of Prokop the Great, Hussites invaded Silesia, Saxony, Hungary, Lusatia, and Meissen. These raids were against countries that had supplied the Germans with men during the anti-Hussite crusades, to deter further participation. However, the raids did not have the desired effect; these countries kept supplying soldiers for the crusades against the Hussites.

During a war between Poland and the Teutonic Order, some Hussite troops helped the Poles. In 1433, a Hussite army of 7,000 men marched through Neumark into Prussia and captured Dirschau on the Vistula River. They eventually reached the mouth of the Vistula where it enters the Baltic Sea near Danzig. There, they performed a great victory celebration to show that nothing but the ocean could stop the Hussites. The Prussian historian Heinrich von Treitschke later wrote that they had "greeted the sea with a wild Czech song about God's warriors, and filled their water bottles with brine in token that the Baltic once more obeyed the Slavs."

== Peace talks ==
The almost uninterrupted series of victories of the Hussites now rendered vain all hope of subduing them by force of arms. Moreover, the conspicuously democratic character of the Hussite movement caused the German princes, who were afraid that such ideas might spread to their own countries, to desire peace. Many Hussites, particularly the Utraquist clergy, were also in favour of peace. Negotiations for this purpose were to take place at the ecumenical Council of Basel which had been summoned to meet on 3 March 1431. The Roman See reluctantly consented to the presence of heretics at this council but indignantly rejected the suggestion of the Hussites that members of the Eastern Orthodox Church, and representatives of all Christian creeds, should also be present. Before definitely giving its consent to peace negotiations, the Roman Church determined on making a last effort to reduce the Hussites to subjection; this resulted in the fifth Crusade against the Hussites.

== Fifth anti-Hussite crusade ==
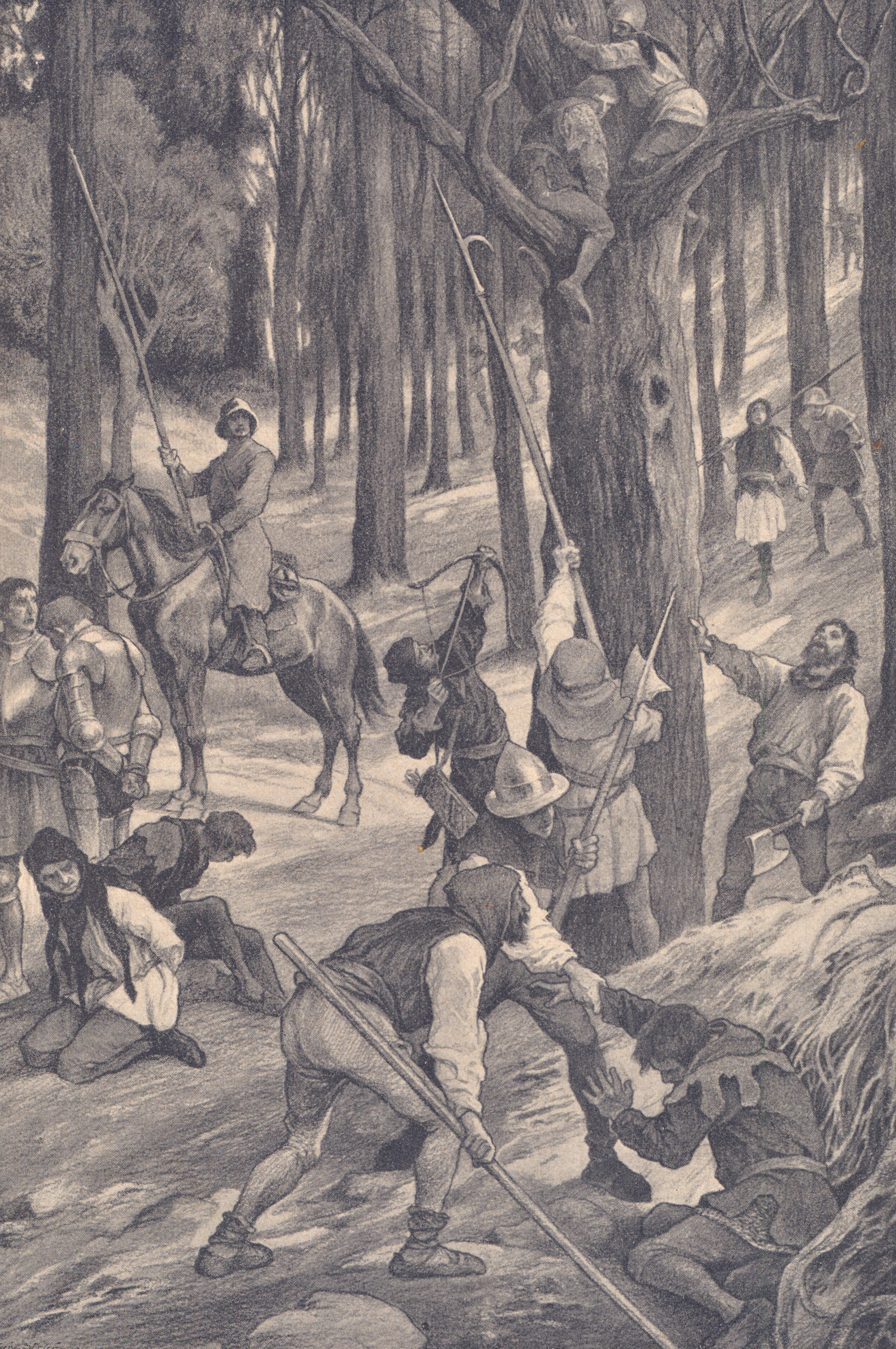
Hussites pursuing the German soldiers after the Battle of Domažlice, romantic painting

On 1 August 1431, a large army of crusaders under Frederick I, Elector of Brandenburg, accompanied by Cardinal Cesarini as papal legate, crossed the Bohemian border. On 8 August the crusaders reached the town of Domažlice and began besieging it. On 14 August, a Hussite relief army arrived, reinforced with some 6,000 Polish Hussites and under the command of Prokop the Great, and it completely routed the crusaders at the resulting Battle of Domažlice. According to legend, upon seeing the Hussite banners and hearing their battle hymn "Ktož jsú boží bojovníci" ("Ye Who are Warriors of God"), the invading papal forces immediately took to flight.

== New negotiations and the defeat of radical Hussites ==
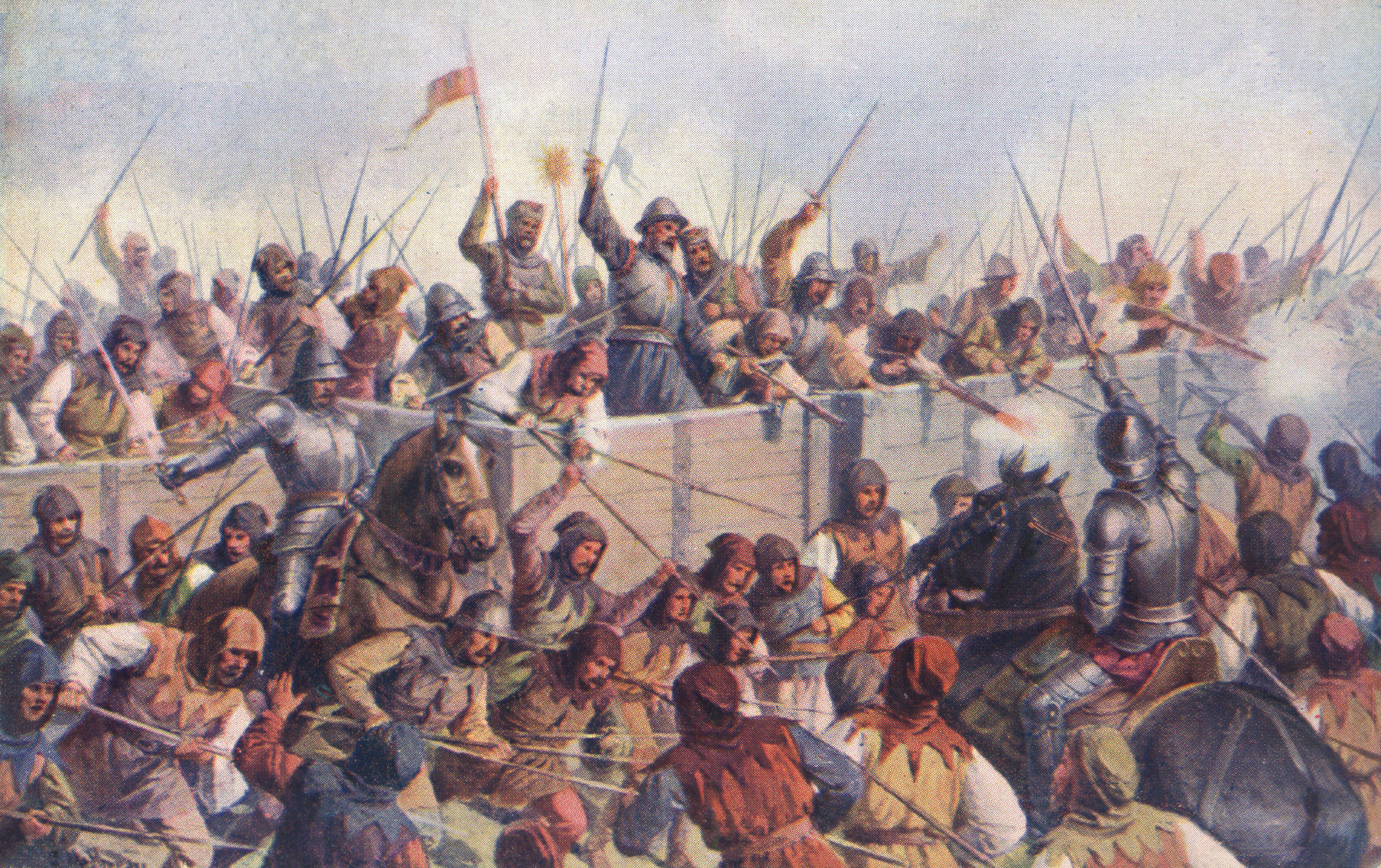
Battle of Lipany, romantic painting

On 15 October 1431, the Council of Basel issued a formal invitation to the Hussites to take part in its deliberations. Prolonged negotiations ensued, but a Hussite embassy, led by Prokop and including John of Rokycan, the Taborite bishop Mikuláš of Pelhřimov, the "English Hussite" Peter Payne, and many others, arrived at Basel on 4 January 1433. No agreement could be reached, but negotiations were not broken off, and a change in the political situation of Bohemia finally resulted in a settlement.

In 1434, war again broke out between the Utraquists and the Taborites. On 30 May 1434, the Taborite army, led by Prokop the Great and Prokop the Lesser, who both fell in the battle, was totally defeated and almost annihilated at the Battle of Lipany.

The Polish Hussite movement also came to an end. Polish royal troops under Władysław III of Varna defeated the Hussites at the Battle of Grotniki in 1439, bringing the Hussite Wars to an end.

== Peace agreement ==
The moderate party thus obtained the upper hand and wanted to find a compromise between the council and the Hussites. It formulated its demands in a document which was accepted by the Church of Rome in a slightly modified form, and which is known as "the compacts". The compacts, mainly founded on the articles of Prague, declare that:

1. The Holy Sacrament is to be given freely in both kinds to all Christians in Bohemia and Moravia, and to those elsewhere who adhere to the faith of these two countries.
2. All mortal sins shall be punished and extirpated by those whose office it is so to do.
3. The word of God is to be freely and truthfully preached by the priests of the Lord, and by worthy deacons.
4. The priests in the time of the law of grace shall claim no ownership of worldly possessions.

On 5 July 1436, the compacts were formally accepted and signed at Jihlava (Iglau), in Moravia, by King Sigismund, the Hussite delegates, and the representatives of the Roman Catholic Church. The latter, however, refused to recognize John of Rokycan as archbishop of Prague, who had been elected to that dignity by the estates of Bohemia.

== Aftermath ==
At the end of the Hussite Wars in 1434, the lands of Bohemia had been totally ravaged. According to some estimates, the population of the Czech lands, estimated at 2.80–3.37 million around 1400, fell to 1.50–1.85 million by 1526. The adjacent Bishopric of Würzburg in Germany was left in such bad shape after the Hussite Wars that the impoverishment of the people was still evident in 1476. The poor conditions contributed directly to the peasant conspiracy that broke out that same year in Würzburg.

In 1466, Pope Paul II excommunicated the Hussite king George of Poděbrady and forbade all Catholics from continuing to serve him. In 1468, the Kingdom of Bohemia was invaded by the king of Hungary, Matthias Corvinus. Matthias invaded with the pretext of returning Bohemia to Catholicism. The Czech Catholic Estates elected Matthias King of Bohemia. Moravia, Silesia and Lusatia soon accepted his rule but Bohemia proper remained faithful to George of Poděbrady. The religious peace of Kutná Hora of 1485 finished a long series of religious conflicts in the Czech lands and constituted a definitive end to the Hussite Wars.

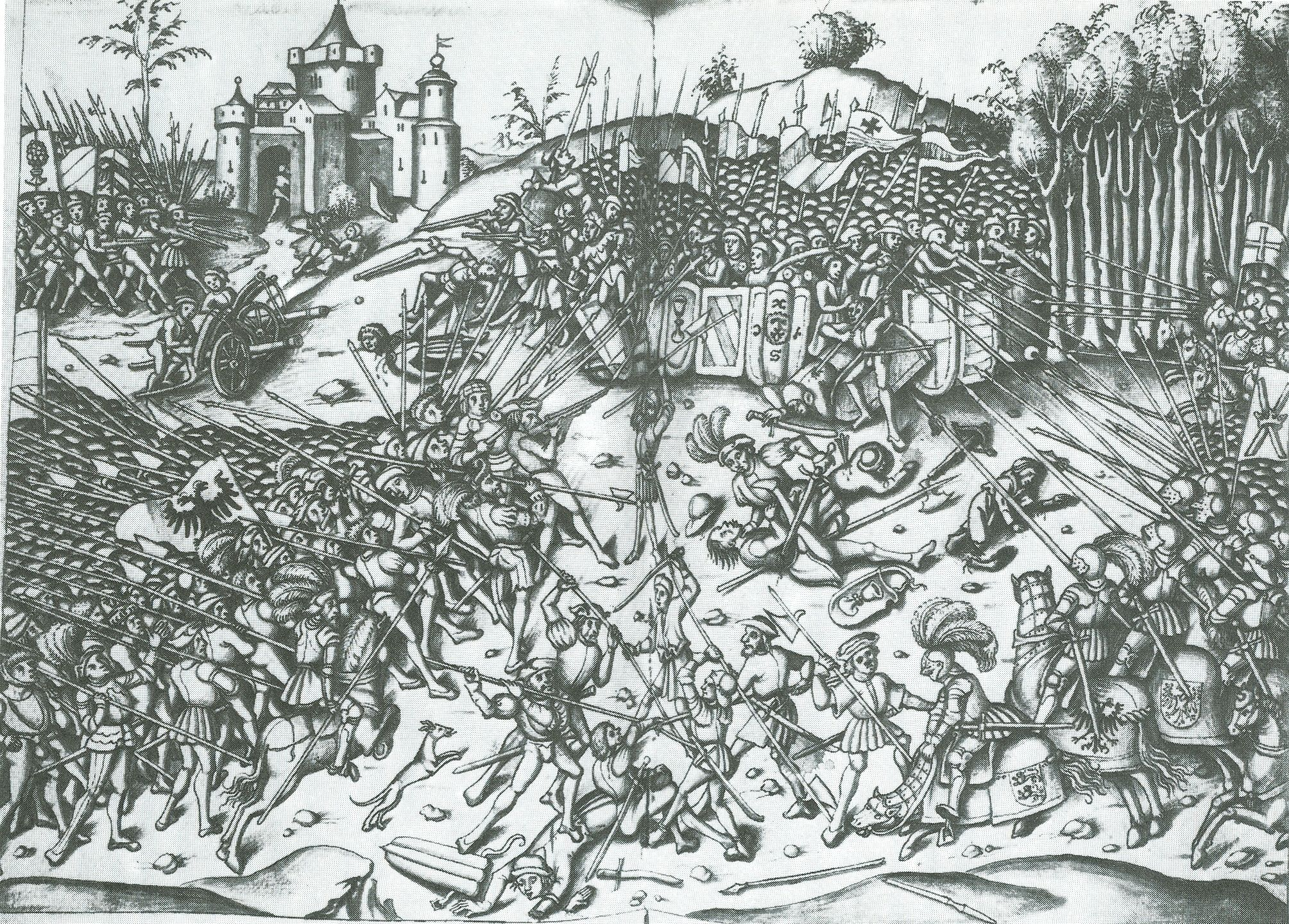
The battle of Wenzenbach between the troops of Emperor Maximilian I and the Czech Utraquists in 1504

The Utraquist creed, frequently varying in its details, continued to be that of the established church of Bohemia until all non-Catholic religious services were prohibited shortly after the Battle of the White Mountain in 1620. The Taborite party never recovered from its defeat at Lipany, and after the town of Tábor had been captured by George of Poděbrady in 1452, Utraquist religious worship was established there. The Moravian Brethren (Unitas Fratrum) - whose intellectual originator was Petr Chelčický but whose actual founders were Brother Gregory, a nephew of Archbishop Rokycany, and Michael, curate of Žamberk – to a certain extent continued the Taborite traditions, and in the 15th and 16th centuries included most of the strongest opponents of Rome in Bohemia.

John Amos Comenius, a member of the Brethren, claimed for the members of his church that they were the genuine inheritors of the doctrines of Hus. After the beginning of the German Reformation, many Utraquists adopted to a large extent the doctrines of Martin Luther and of John Calvin and, in 1567, obtained the repeal of the Compacts which no longer seemed sufficiently far-reaching. From the end of the 16th century, the inheritors of the Hussite tradition in Bohemia were included in the more general name of "Protestants" borne by the adherents of the Reformation.

== In popular culture ==
Andrzej Sapkowski's Hussite Trilogy is set in the Lands of the Bohemian Crown (mostly Silesia and Bohemia) during the Hussite Wars.

Dívčí Válka (2013), a manga series by Kouichi Ohnishi, focuses on a girl named Šárka who joins the Hussite Wars after the deaths of her family.

Kingdom Come: Deliverance and its sequel feature many influential figures involved in the Hussite Wars, these games take place prior to the Hussite Wars, 1403, but they include Jan Žižka and mentions of Jan Hus.

== See also ==
- Bartholomaeus of Drahonice
- German Peasants' War
- Schmalkaldic War
- The Slav Epic (Painting: "The meeting at Křížky: Sub utraque")
