= Battle of Domažlice =

1431 battle of the Hussite Wars

Coordinates: 49°24′30″N 12°59′36″E

- Part of the Hussite Wars – 5th anti-Hussite crusade
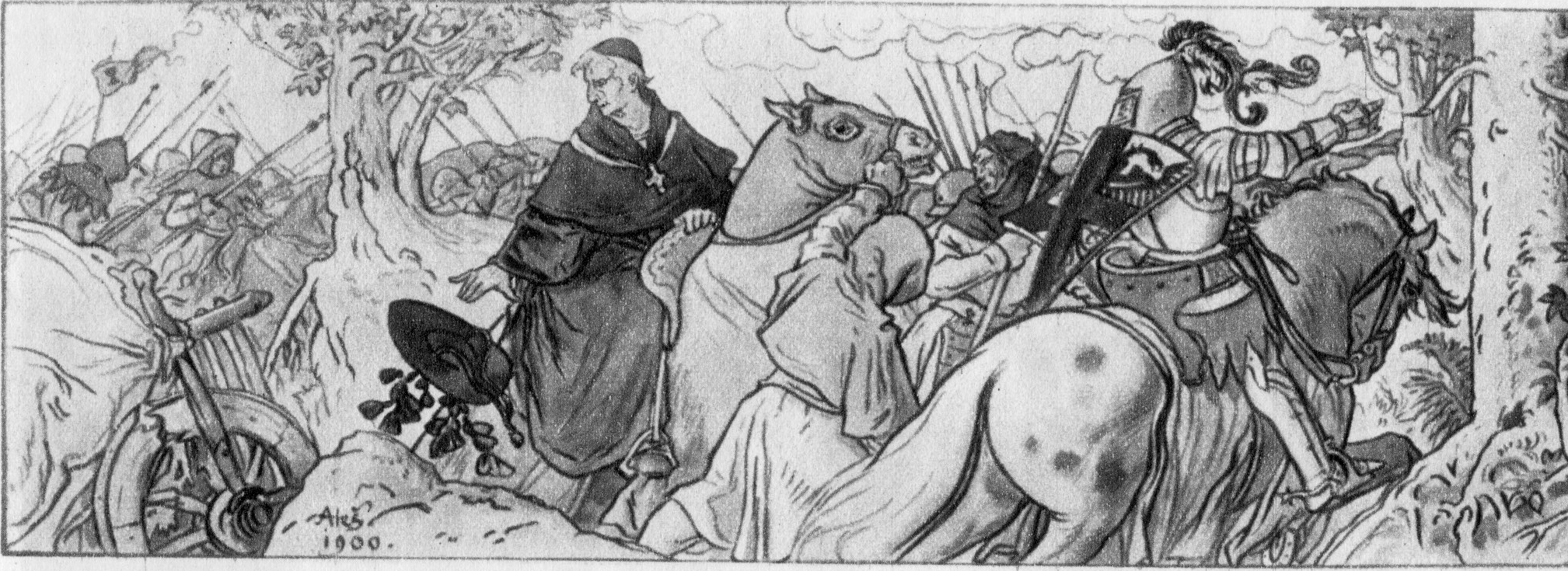
- Retreat of Catholic forces at Battle of Domažlice, romantic painting
Date	14 August 1431
Location	Domažlice (Taus), Bohemia
Result	Hussite victory

Belligerents
Crusade: Holy Roman Empire; Brandenburg; Bohemian Catholics; Bavaria; Saxony; Swabian cities; Electoral Cologne; Electoral Mainz; Austria; Prince-Bishopric of Würzburg; some Imperial cities; Papal States (Italian contingent); Kingdom of Hungary	Hussite coalition: Praguers; Orphans; Union of Žatec and Louny; Taborites; most of the Hussite cities; Hussite nobility; Grand Duchy of Lithuania

Commanders and leaders
Frederick of Brandenburg; Cardinal Cesarini; Jindřich of Plavno; Jan Vircburský; Albert of Habsburg	Prokop the Bald; Sigismund Korybut

Strength
30,000–50,000	20,000

Casualties and losses
>1,500	Unknown

The Battle of Domažlice (Czech: Bitva u Domažlic) or Battle of Taus (German: Schlacht bei Taus) or Battle of Tausch was fought on 14 August 1431 as the part of the 5th crusade against Hussites. The crusade was sent to Bohemia after negotiations, held in Pressburg and Cheb, between Hussites and the emperor Sigismund had failed.

== Outcome ==
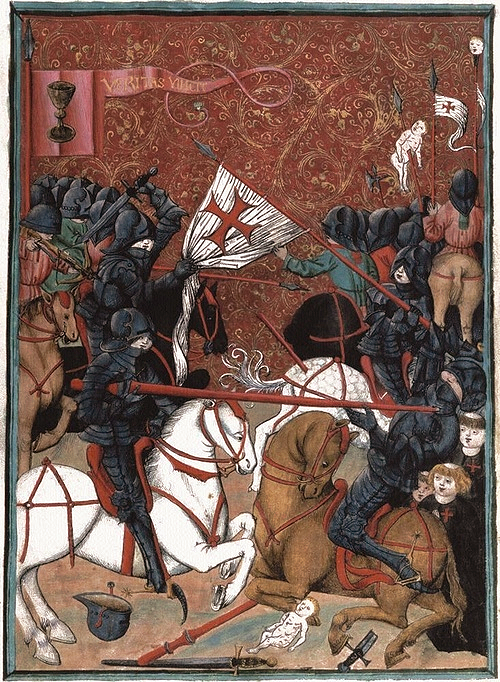
Iconic battle between Hussites and Catholic crusaders, probably Battle of Domažlice, illustration from the Jena codex (15th century)

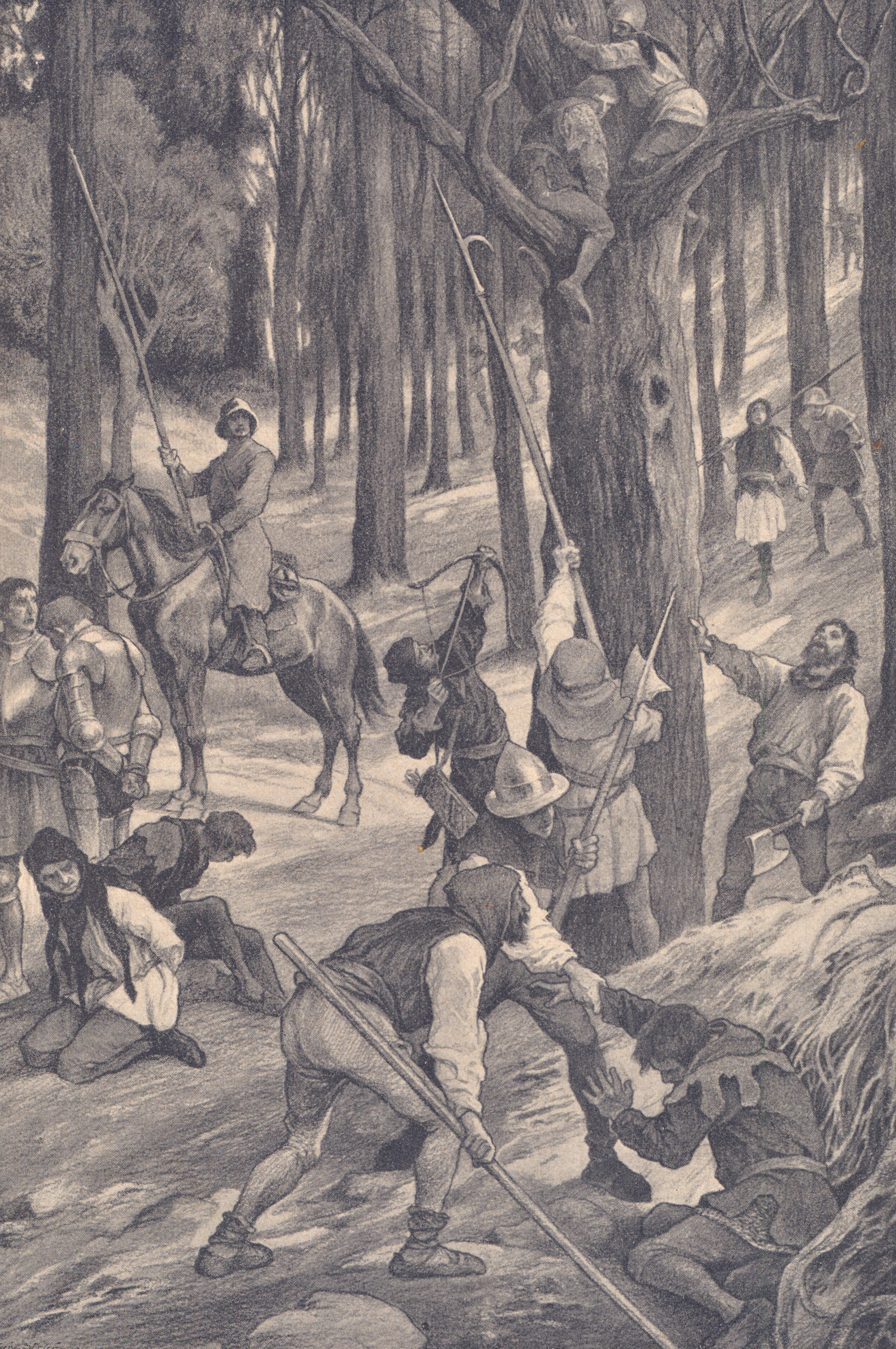
Hussites persecuting the German soldiers after the Battle of Domažlice, romantic painting

According to legend, the Imperial army was besieging the city of Domažlice since 8 August, when the sight of the approaching and singing Hussite relief army led by Prokop the Bald and hearing their battle hymn "Ktož jsú boží bojovníci" ("Ye Who are Warriors of God"), led to mass panicking among the crusaders, who fled through the Bohemian Forest. The Hussites immediately set after the fleeing Imperial army and annihilated its remnants. Reportedly, 8,000 wagons and all the equipment of the crusaders were captured. The crusader army was accompanied by papal legate Julian Cesarini who escaped, but lost all of his luggage in the retreat, including the secret correspondence and the Papal bull charging him to hire crusaders.

== Sources ==
- Ich Wolkenstein, by Dieter Kühn; Insel Verlag Frankfurt am Main, 1977 ISBN 3-458-32197-7
