= Sigismund Korybut =

Hussite military commander and governor

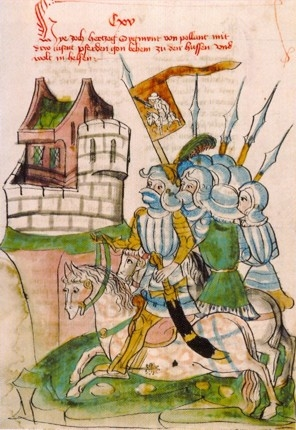
Sigismund Korybut and his troops flying a Lithuanian banner

Sigismund Korybut (Lithuanian: Žygimantas Kaributaitis; Belarusian: Жыгімонт Карыбутавіч; Polish: Zygmunt Korybutowicz; Czech: Zikmund Korybutovič; Ukrainian: Жиґимонт Корибутович or Сигізмунд Корибутович, c. 1395 – 1435 near Vilkmergė) was a duke and knight from the Korybut dynasty, best known as a military commander of the Hussite army and a governor of Bohemia and Prague during the Hussite Wars.

== Biography ==
Sigismund was most likely born in Novhorod-Siverskyi to Dymitr Korybut, son of Algirdas, Grand Duke of Lithuania, and Anastasia, daughter of Grand Prince Oleg of Ryazan, and raised in the court of Korybut's brother (his uncle) Jogaila (Władysław Jagiełło) in Kraków since 1404. Sigismund was rumored to be expected to become his successor on the Polish throne. Being just an adolescent, he commanded his own banner of the Army of the Crown in the victorious Battle of Grunwald in 1410.

His elder sister, Olena (Helena) had been married to an important magnate of Bohemian kingdom, John II, Duke of Opava-Ratibor.

As a regent of Bohemia for Grand Duke of Lithuania Vytautas, he was commissioned to lead his army to Bohemia in April 1422. The army of Sigismund of Hungary retreated to Hungary in avoidance of the encounter. Sigismund Korybut arrived in Prague on 16 May 1422, and was acknowledged ruler of Bohemia. He became commander of local Hussites, and fought in Hussite internal disputes. Pope Martin V insisted that Vytautas and Jogaila recall Sigismund from Bohemia. On 24 December 1423, under Jogaila's agreement with Sigismund of Hungary, Sigismund Korybut left Prague with his army.

However, he could not refuse an offer of the Bohemian throne and on 29 June 1424 he once again came to Prague with 1,500-strong army, this time without Vytautas' and Jogaila's consent; their primary objective had been a successful implementation of the Treaty of Melno, thus a conflict with Sigismund of Hungary was undesirable. Therefore, Jogaila ordered a confiscation of Sigismund's estates, and the Papal legate excommunicated him. Meanwhile, as a governor of Prague, he dismissed the city's council, summoned a new one and succeed in ending the internal discords between Jan Žižka and the Utraquists, enabling a successful Hussite military campaign to Moravia against Emperor Sigismund. After Žižka's death, he became a supreme commander of his army, leading it to victory in the Battle of Usti nad Labem on 16 June 1426.

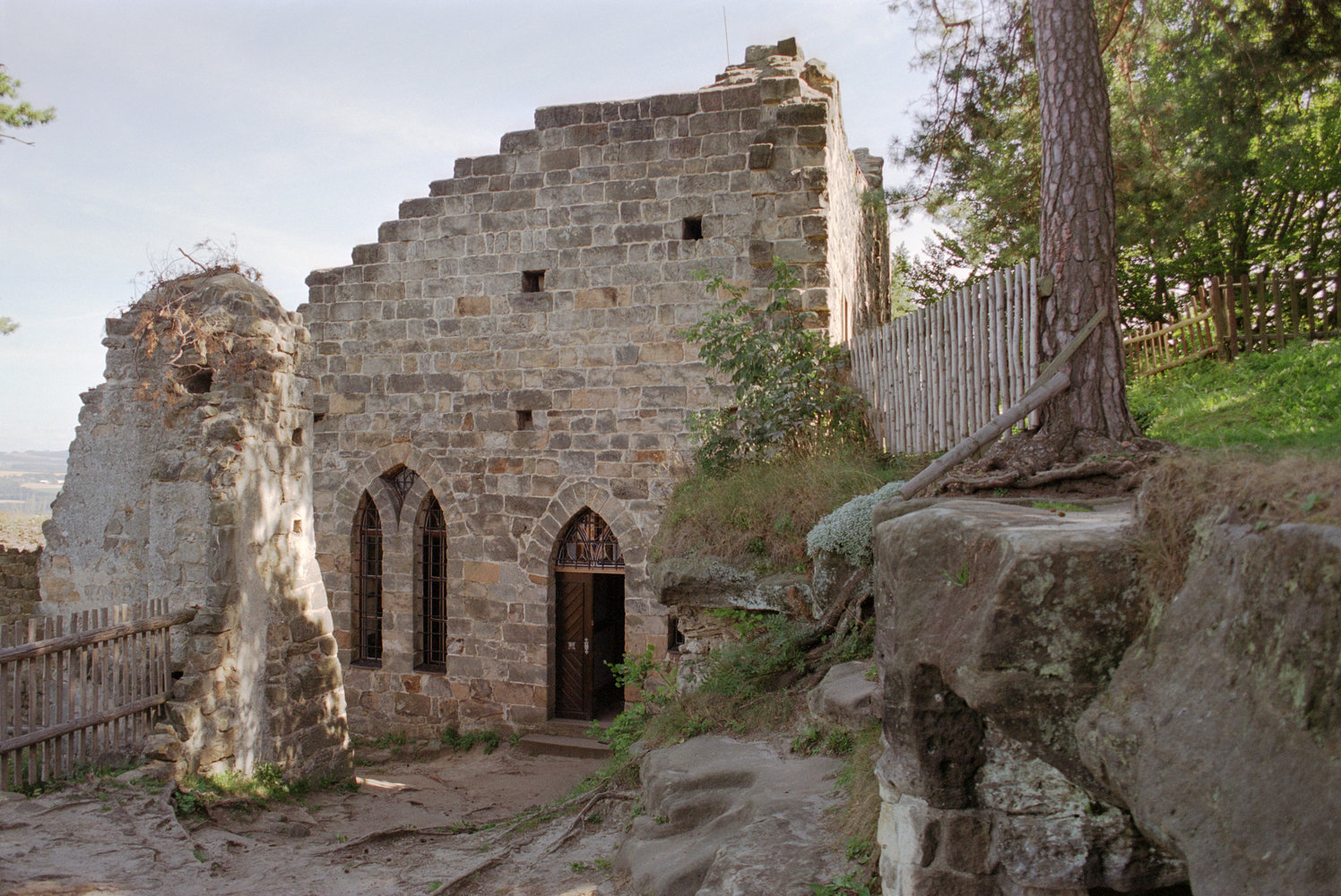
Castle Waldstein: Sigismund had spent several months in prison there

Sigismund Korybut began negotiations with Sigismund of Hungary, with an intention to reconcile the Catholics and Hussites. However, his political career came to an end in 1427, when by the initiative of suspicious Prague Taborites, he was imprisoned in Valdštejn Castle for the organization of a revolt in Prague. After release from prison in 1428, Sigismund participated in Taborite battles in Silesia. The decisive loss in the Battle of Lipany forced him to return to the Grand Duchy of Lithuania.

Sigismund Korybut was among the commanders in the Battle of Wiłkomierz on the side of his uncle Švitrigaila on 1 September 1435. His army was decisively defeated by Sigismund Kęstutaitis' forces. Sigismund Korybut was wounded during the battle, however he fought till the end. According to Jan Długosz, the cause of his death was severe infection of his wounds (extremo mortis horrendae supplicio).

== See also ==
- Gediminids

== Literature ==
- Chłędowski Kazimierz. Zygmunt Korybut: szkic historyczny (1420–1428). Warszawa, 1864.
- Grygiel Jerzy. Życie i działalność Zygmunta Korybutowicza. Studium z dziejów stosunków polsko-czeskich w pierwszej połowie XV wieku // PAN, oddział w Krakowie. Wydawnictwo Ossolineum. Wrocław, 1988.
- Nikodem Jarosław. Polska i Litwa wobec husyckich Czech w latach 1420–1433. Studium o polityce dynastycznej Władysława Jagiełły i Witolda Kiejstutowicza // Instytut Historii UAM. Poznań, 2004.
