= Prokop the Great =

14/15th-century Hussite general

- Portrait of Prokop Holý as imagined by a 17th-century artist.
- Born: c. 1380
- Died: 30 May 1434; Lipany (now part of Vitice, Kolín District, Czech Republic)
- Military career
- Conflicts: Hussite Wars: Battle of Aussig; Siege of Břeclav; Battle of Zwettl; Battle of Tachov; Battle of Nysa; Battle of Domažlice; Siege of Plzeň (1433–1434); Battle of Lipany †

Prokop defending himself at the Siege of Pilsen (1433–34)

Prokop the Great (Czech: Prokop Veliký, Latin: Procopius Magnus) or Prokop the Bald or the Shaven (Czech: Prokop Holý, Latin: Procopius Rasus) (c. 1380 – 30 May 1434) was a Czech Hussite general and a prominent Taborite military leader during the Hussite Wars. On his mother's side, he came from a German patrician family living in Prague.

Initially, Prokop was a member of the Utraquists (the moderate wing of the Hussites) and was a married priest (having received the tonsure early in life) who belonged to an eminent, partly German-speaking family from Prague. He studied in Prague, and then traveled for several years in foreign countries. On his return to Bohemia, though a priest and continuing to officiate as such, he became the most prominent leader of the advanced Hussite or Taborite forces during the latter part of the Hussite Wars. He was not the immediate successor of Jan Žižka as leader of the Taborites, as has been frequently stated, but he commanded the forces of Tabor when they obtained their great victories over the Germans and Catholics at Ústí nad Labem in 1426 and Domažlice in 1431. The crushing defeat that he inflicted on the crusaders of the Holy Roman Empire at Domažlice led to peace negotiations (1432) at Cheb between the Hussites and representatives of the Council of Basel.

He also acted as leader of the Taborites during their frequent incursions into Hungary and Germany, particularly when in 1429 a vast Bohemian army invaded Saxony and the territory of Nuremberg. The Hussites, however, made no attempt permanently to conquer German territory, and on 6 February 1430 Prokop concluded a treaty at Kulmbach with Frederick I, burgrave of Nuremberg, by which the Hussites engaged themselves to leave Germany. When the Bohemians entered into negotiations with Sigismund and the Council of Basel and, after prolonged discussions, resolved to send an embassy to the council, Prokop the Great was its most prominent member, reaching Basel on 4 January 1433. When the negotiations there for a time proved fruitless, Prokop with the other envoys returned to Bohemia, where new internal troubles broke out.

A Taborite army led by Prokop the Great besieged Plzeň, which was then in the hands of the Catholics. The discipline in the Hussite camp had, however, slackened in the course of prolonged warfare, and the Taborites encamped before Plzeň revolted against Prokop, who therefore returned to Prague.

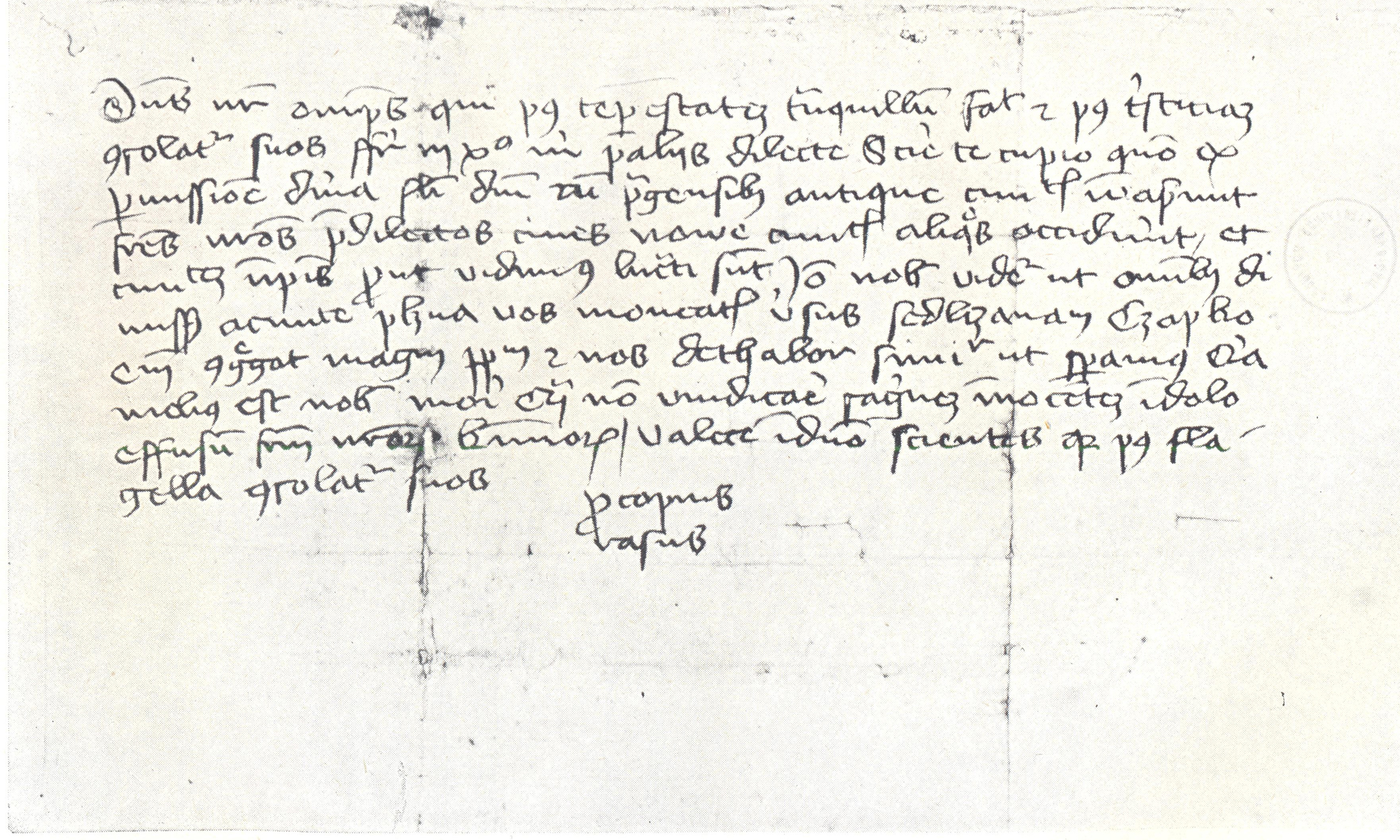
A letter dated 6 May 1434 from Prokop to the besiegers of Plzeň informing them of the taking of the New Town, signed "Procopius Rasus"

Probably encouraged by these dissensions among the men of Tabor, the Bohemian nobility, both Catholic and Utraquist, formed a league for the purpose of opposing radicalism, which through the victories of Tabor had acquired great strength in the Bohemian towns. The struggle began at Prague. Aided by the nobles, the citizens of the Old Town took possession of the more radical New Town, Prague, which Prokop unsuccessfully attempted to defend. Prokop now called to his aid Prokop the Lesser, who had succeeded him in the command of the Taborite army before Plzeň. They jointly retreated eastward from Prague, and their forces, known as the army of the towns, met the army of the nobles between Kourim and Kolín in the Battle of Lipany (30 May 1434). The Taborites were decisively defeated, and both Prokops, Great and Lesser, perished in the battle.

The fourth rifle regiment of Czechoslovak legions was named after him in July 1917.

== In popular culture ==
Martin Růžek portrayed Prokop the Great in 1963 film Spanilá jízda. Prokop the Great also appears in 2013 animated film The Hussites.

Prokop the Great is a supporting character in a 2022 video game 1428: Shadows over Silesia.
