= Bartholomaeus of Drahonice =

Bohemian soldier and author

Bartholomaeus of Drahonice (c. 1390–1443) was a Bohemian soldier, and author of a chronicle of the Hussite revolution.
