= Mikuláš of Pelhřimov =

Czech theologian and philosopher

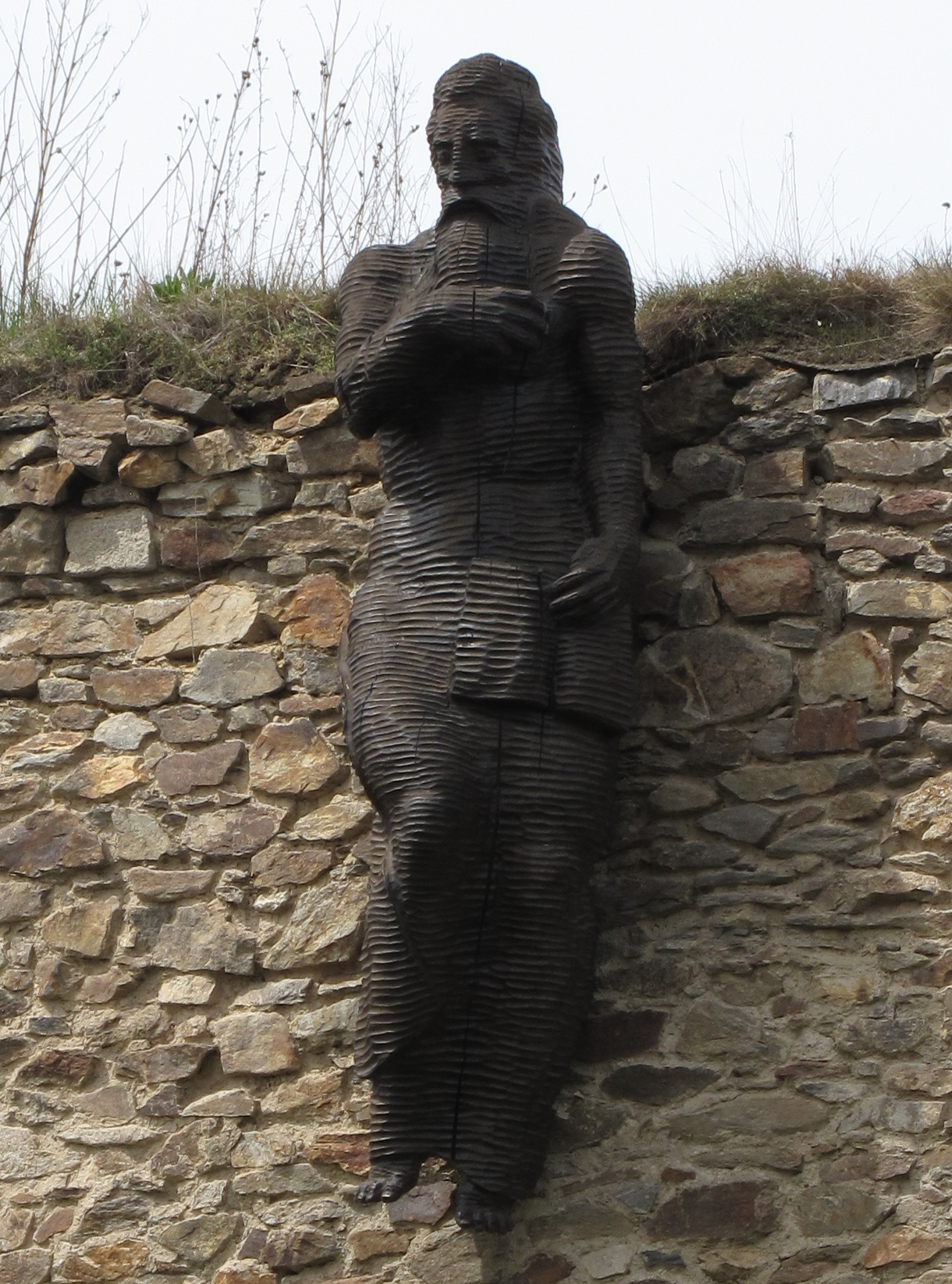
- Wooden statue of Mikuláš of Pelhřimov by Matouš Háša
- Born: c. 1385; Pelhřimov, Bohemia
- Died: c. 1459; Poděbrady, Bohemia
- Other names: Mikuláš Biskupec, Nicolaus Pilgramensis, Nicolaus Biskupec

Education
- Education: University of Prague

Philosophical work
- Era: Renaissance philosophy
- Region: Western philosophy
- School: Hussite
- Main interests: Theology

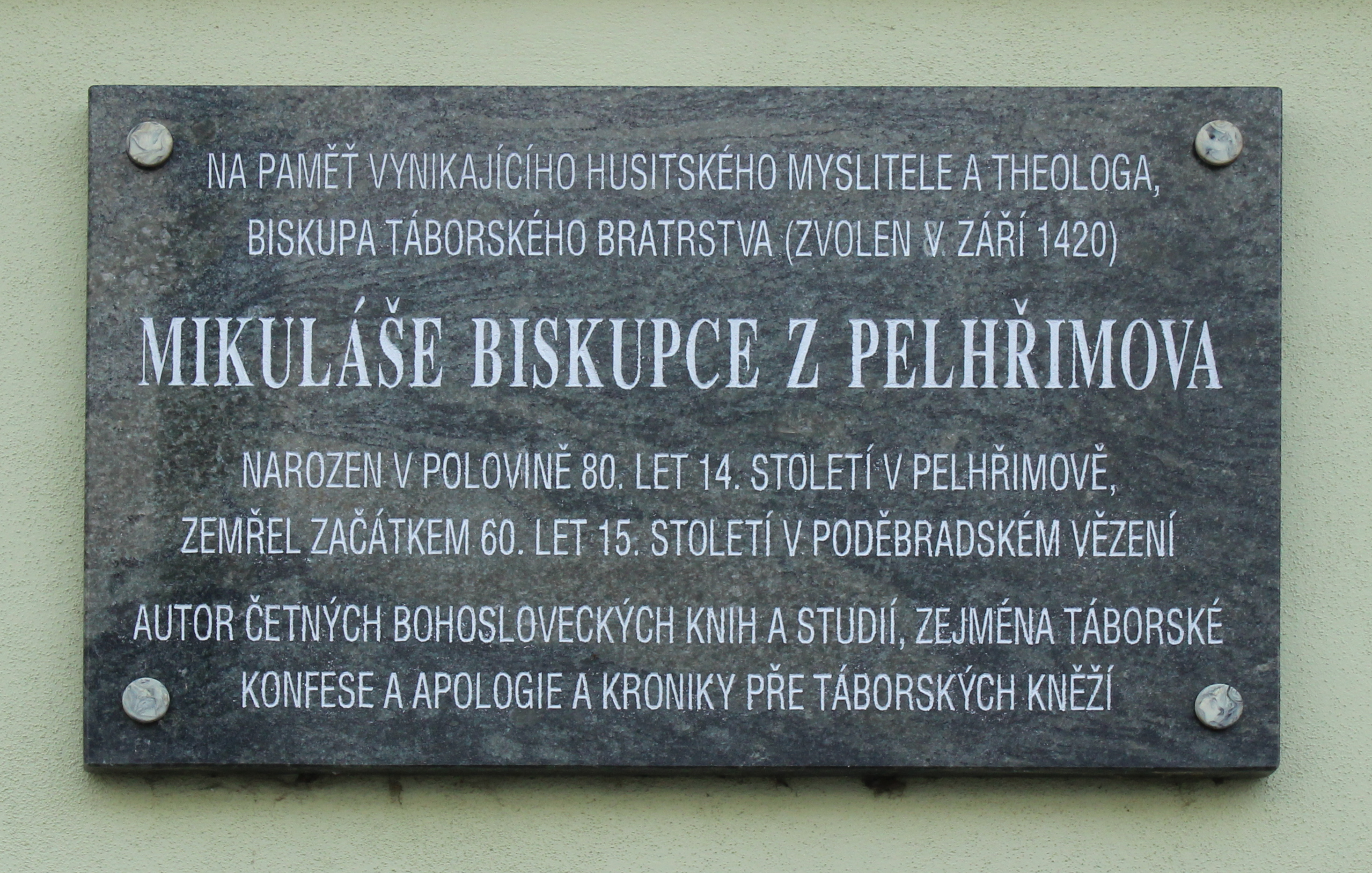
Commemorative plaque of Mikuláš of Pelhřimov on the wall of the congregation house of the Evangelical Church of Czech Brethren in Pelhřimov

Nicholas of Pelhřimov (Czech: Mikuláš z Pelhřimova), also called Mikuláš Biskupec (c. 1385 – c. 1459) was a Czech Hussite priest, bachelor of liberal arts, from 1420 the head ("bishop") of the independent Taborite church. In the theological polemics against the Prague masters, he was the main spokesman for the Taborites and their most important theologist. His treatise Confessio Taboritarum (Confession and Defense of Tábor) was significant in the international Reformation literature and is known from 16th and early 17th century prints.

== Biography ==
Mikuláš was born in Pelhřimov, most likely in a burgher family. He was born in the mid-1380s. He was educated at the Pelhřimov town school and later studied at the Faculty of Arts of the University of Prague; in 1409 he became a Bachelor of Liberal Arts. In Prague he witnessed the activities of the master Jan Hus. He was a follower of Hus, as evidenced by his membership of Queen Hedwig's College, founded largely thanks to Hus soon after the Decree of Kutná Hora. In 1415 he was ordained a priest and left to Kondrac. From the very beginning he was involved in the Hussite movement and from the foundation of Tábor until its fall he was one of its leading theologians.

In 1420, the people of Tábor "unanimously elected Mikuláš of Pelhřimov, a priest and bachelor of arts, as their bishop or elder, that all his priests should acknowledge him as their superior, and that no one should preach the word of God to the people except with the permission of the bishop, and that he and the other priests should faithfully distribute the money of the community according to the need of each brother, as he saw fit." Despite being called a "bishop", he was only an elde. The synod of priests held the power to decide important matters. He did not ordain the priests of Tábor, and he had the power only to choose the priests and laymen preachers. It has been suggested that he inherited the name "Bishop" from his father.

He first spoke as a representative of the Taborites at a meeting of the Hussite theologians of Tábor and Prague in the house of Petr Zmrzlík in December 1420. However, no consensus was reached there. He also defended the moderate Tábor doctrine against the radical Picardian and chiliastic ideas, which were held by a group of Tábor priests led by Martin Húska and Petr Kániš.

As a representative of Tábor he participated in all disputes with the Prague university masters. He also contributed significantly to the formulation of the Tábor doctrine, e.g. at the synod of in February 1422. He was present at the meeting in Cheb about the participation of the Hussite mission at the Council of Basel. Biskupec was one of the four speakers who defended the Hussite principles at the council. In his speeches on 20 and 21 January 1433 he justified the article on the punishment of public sins.

In 1443, he defended the Tabor doctrine against the Prague masters at the synod in Kutná Hora. The synod ended without agreement and postponed the decision to the congress. In 1444, the provincial congress approved the theological positions of Jan Rokycana and the teaching of the theologians of Tábor was condemned as false. However, Mikuláš of Pelhřimov and his followers refused to submit to the decision.

As an elder of the priests of Tábor, he was undoubtedly based in Tábor and certainly lived there for some time, but this was not always the case. For a considerable part of the Hussite wars he was the theological leader of the Písek Hussite community that was the most important after Tábor and belonged to the movement from its inception. Mikuláš is also recorded as a parish priest in Písek in 1443. When Písek submitted to the provincial governor George of Poděbrady in 1449, Biskupec left for Tábor. In August 1452, however, Tábor also surrendered to George and Mikuláš was imprisoned in the Old Town Hall until he promised obedience to Jan Rokycana. However, even then he was not released, and was kept in a dungeon in the castle of the provincial governor in Poděbrady. He suffered severe injuries during an attempted escape. Mikuláš died probably in 1459.

== Teachings ==
In the doctrine of the Eucharist, he rejected the dogma of transubstantiation ("over-substantiation"), which is the doctrine about the actual presence of the body of Jesus in this ritual. In his view, the sacramental bread "is not identical with the body of Christ seated in heaven at the right hand of God, nor is the body of Christ there as some claim, because this mode of presence would presuppose the extinction of the substance of the bread and the transformation of its substance into the body of Christ". Mikuláš rejects the dogma that the substance of bread and wine ceases after the consecration and is replaced by the substance of the body and blood of Christ. According to his doctrine, in the elements of the Eucharist (the bread and the wine) the body of Christ is present only spiritually and sacramentally. To the faithful who receive the sacrament properly, Christ gives "life, pasture, delight, spiritual help, consolation, and satiation."

Mikuláš also opposed the celebration of mass in chasubles, rejected purgatory, prayers for the dead, fasting, the celebration of feasts except on Sundays, and all ostentatious ecclesiastical ceremonies. The Bible alone should be the foundation of Christianity; the doctrines of the Church are from fallible men, and can only be accepted if they are in accordance with the law of Jesus Christ.

== Works ==
- 1431–1433 – Confessio Taboritarum (Confession and defense of Tábor). The work was written as an interpretation and defense of the Taborite orders before the Council of Basel.
- 1433 – Speeches from the Council of Basel
  1435–1439 – Scriptum super quattuor evangelia in unum concordata (interpretations of the Gospels).
- 1441–1444 – Chronicon continens causam sacerdotium taboriensium (The Chronicle of Tábor). The three-part chronicle describes the positions of the Taborites and describes the period from 1419 to 1444. It is not a complete work; only documents and tracts.

== See also ==
- Bohemian Reformation
- Husites
