= Peter Payne =

English theologian and diplomat (c. 1380-c. 1455)

Peter Payne (c. 1380 – c. 1455) was an English theologian, diplomat, Lollard and Taborite. The son of a Frenchman by an English wife, he was born at Hough-on-the-Hill near Grantham.

He was educated in Oxford, where he adopted Lollard opinions, and had graduated as a master of arts before 6 October 1406, when he was concerned in the irregular proceedings through which a letter declaring the sympathy of the university was addressed to the Bohemian reformers. From 1410 to 1414 Payne was principal of St Edmund Hall, and during these years was engaged in controversy with Thomas Netter of Walden, the Carmelite defender of Catholic doctrine.

In 1414 he was compelled to leave Oxford and taught for a time in London. Ultimately he had to flee from England, and took refuge in Bohemia, where he was received by the University of Prague on 13 February 1417, and soon became a leader of the reformers. He joined the sect of the "Orphans," and had a prominent part in the discussions and conferences of the ten years from 1420 to 1430.

When the Bohemians agreed to send representatives to the Council of Basel, Payne was naturally chosen to be one of their delegates. He arrived at Basel, on 4 January 1433, and his unyielding temper and bitter words probably did much to prevent a settlement. The Bohemians left Basel in April. The party of the nobles, who had been ready to make terms, were attacked in the Diet at Prague, by the Orphans and Taborites. Next year the dispute led to open war. The nobles were victorious at the Battle of Lipany in May 1434, and it was reported in England that Payne was killed. When soon afterwards the majority of the Orphans joined the moderate party, Payne allied himself with the more extreme Taborites.

Nevertheless, his reputation was so great that he was accepted as an arbitrator in doctrinal disputes amongst the reformers. In February 1437 the Pope desired the emperor Sigismund to send Payne to be tried for heresy at Basel. Payne had to leave his pastorate at Žatec, and took refuge with Petr Chelčický, the Bohemian author. Two years later he was captured and imprisoned at Gutenstein, but was ransomed by his Taborite friends. Payne took part in the conferences of the Bohemian parties in 1443–1444, and again in 1452. He died at Prague in 1455.

He was a learned and eloquent controversialist, and a faithful adherent to Wycliffe's doctrine. Payne was also known as Clerk at Oxford, as Peter English in Bohemia, and as Freyng, after his French father, and Hough from his birthplace.
