= Věnceslav Černý =

Czech illustrator and painter (1865–1936)

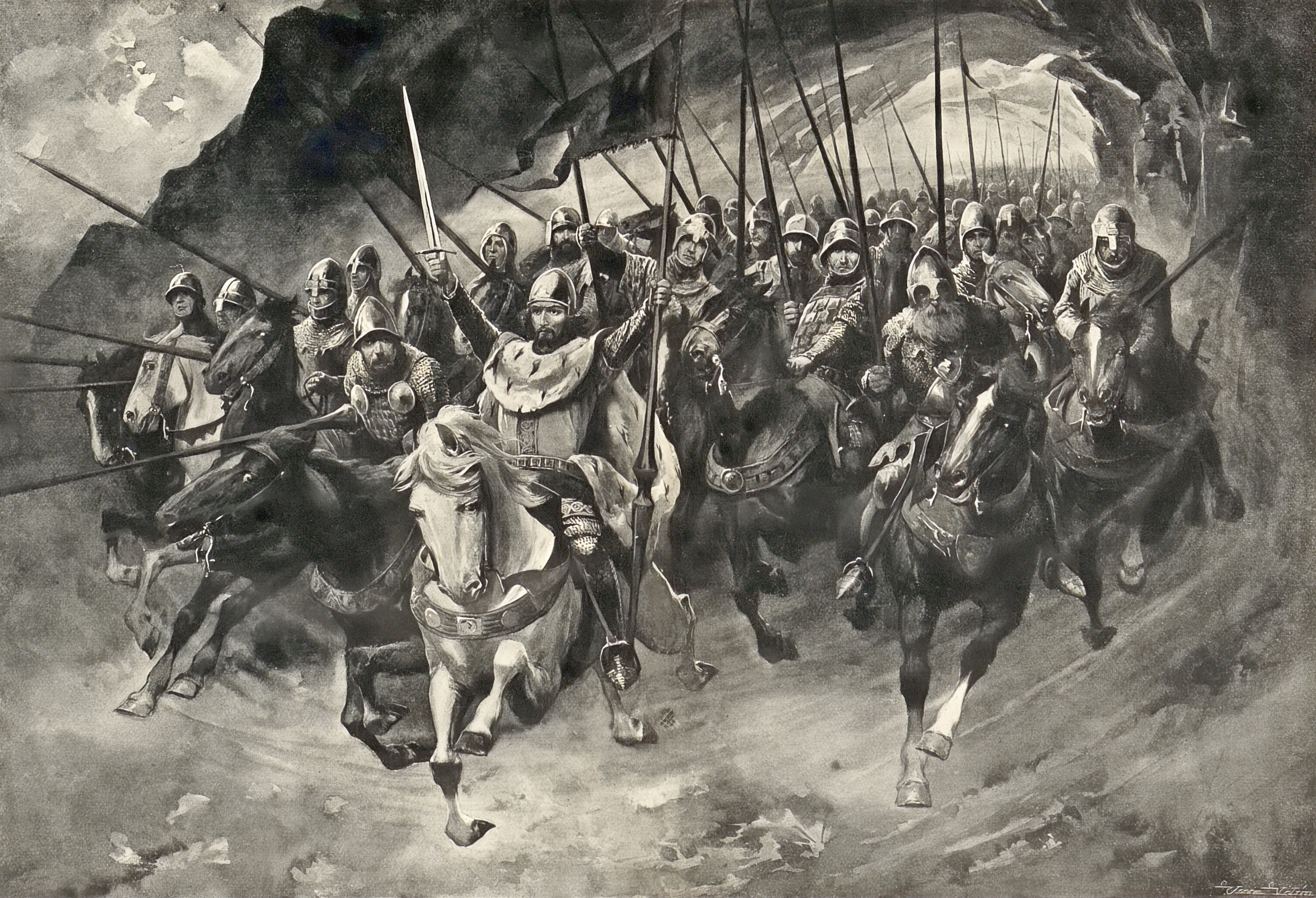
Saint Wenceslas Rises from the Mountain at the Head of the Knights of Blanice (1898)

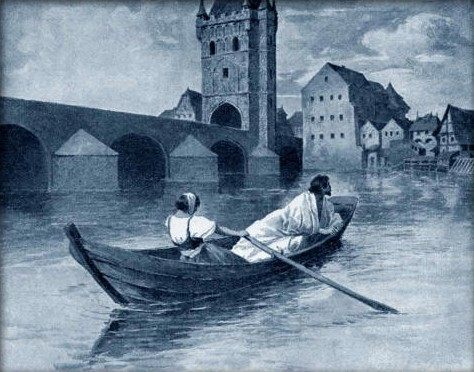
Lazebnice převáží krále Václava

Věnceslav Černý (27 January 1865 in Staré Benátky (part of Benátky nad Jizerou) - 15 April 1936 in Mladá Boleslav) was a Czech illustrator and painter.

He studied at the Prague Academy of Fine Arts, later the Academy in Vienna. Alternately lived in Prague, Mladá Boleslav and Železnice. He was almost exclusively devoted to illustrating books (especially adventure books) and magazines (Světozor, Zlatá Praha). A very high percentage of his works are related to historical battle themes and mediaeval civilisation in the form of drawings and large paintings.

He was a popular illustrator of many publishing houses in Prague (e.g. Kvasnička a Hampl, Alois Hynek, Toužimský etc.), and illustrated many books, especially those by Lidia Charskaya, František Josef Čečetka, Alois Jirásek, Karl May, Henryk Sienkiewicz. In the years 1893-1909 he illustrated sixteen books of Jules Verne. Černý also illustrated various cultural events that took place in the village where he lived.

== See also ==
- List of Czech painters
