= Taborites =

Faction of the Hussites

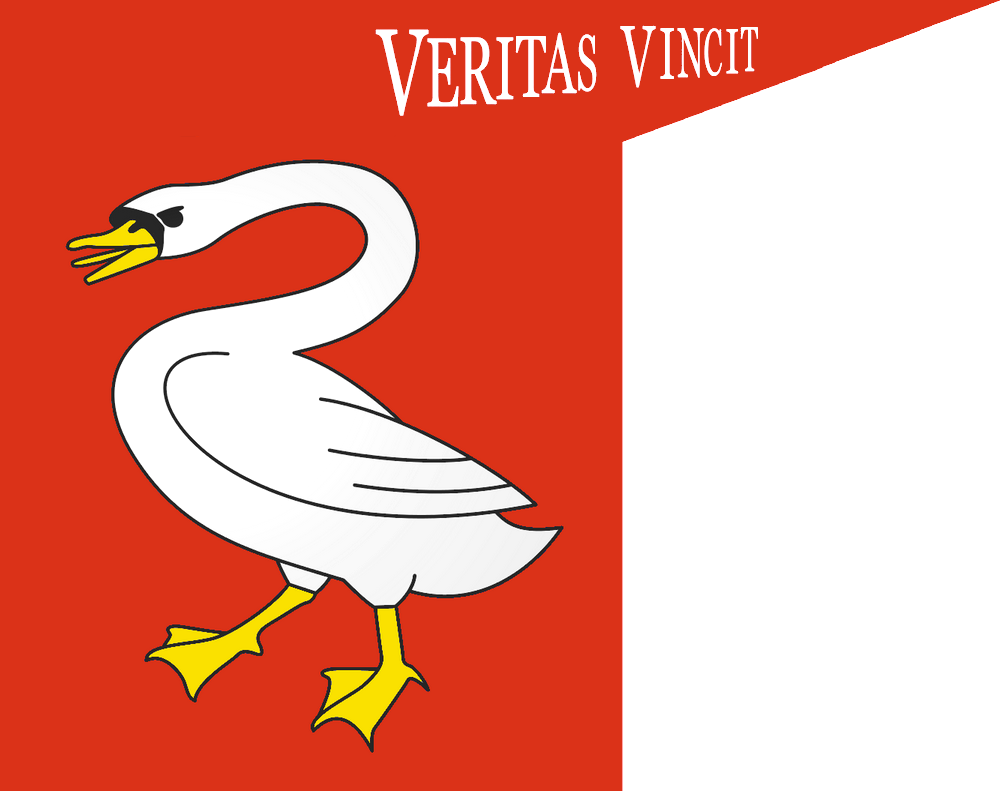
Banner supposedly used by Taborite forces led by Bohuslav of Švamberg, whose heraldic emblem was a swan on a red field, later confused with a goose (Czech: husa) as a general symbol of the Hussite movement.

The Taborites (Czech: Táborité, Czech: singular Táborita), were a faction within the Hussite movement in the medieval Lands of the Bohemian Crown. The Taborites were sometimes referred to as the Picards, a term used for groups which were seen as extreme in their rejection of traditional Catholic practices and societal norms, for example advocation for communal living.

Although most of the Taborites were of rural origin, they played a major role in the town of Tábor. Taborite politics were also encroached upon by their priests. The most important Taborites included the governors Jan Žižka of Trocnov, Mikuláš of Hus, Bohuslav of Švamberk, Chval Řepický of Machovice, and Jan Roháč of Dubá, and the priest Prokop Holý. The main centre of their association was Tábor.

The Taborites were centered in the Bohemian town of Tábor during the Hussite Wars in the 15th century. The religious reform movement in Bohemia splintered into various religious sects. Besides the Taborites, these included the Adamites, the Orebites, the Sirotci ("Orphans"), the Utraquists and the Praguers. Because the impetus for these movements came from the burning of Jan Hus, it has become common practice to label them all "Hussites".

The Taborites' theology represented a departure from that of the medieval Catholic Church. They insisted on the normativeness of biblical authority. Even though Taborite theologians were versed in scholastic theology, they rejected scholastic methods.

== History ==
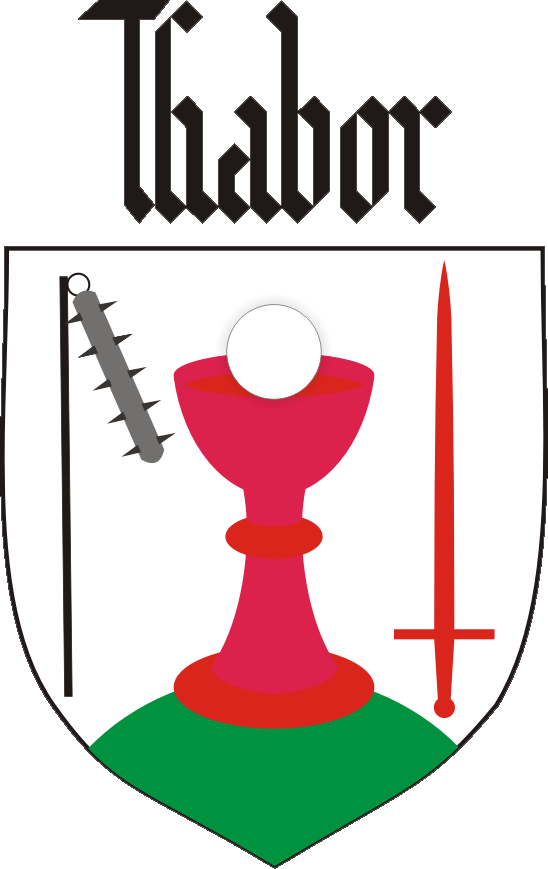
Coat of arms of Tábor until 1437

In the spring of 1420, a group of Hussites led by Petr Hromádka managed to seize the town of Sezimovo Ústí and the nearby Hradiště Castle in South Bohemia. They then began to build the model Hussite town Hradiště hory Tabor – shortened to Tábor – named after Mount Tabor in Galilee. Social and economic equality was promoted in the town, and the Taborites addressed each other as brothers and sisters. Hussites flocked to Tábor from all over Bohemia. Economically supported by Tábor's control of local gold mines, the citizens joined the local peasants in developing an intentionally communal living. Taborites announced the Millennium of Christ, and declared that there would be no more servants or masters, that all property would be held in common, and that there would be no more taxation. They promised that people would return to a state of pristine innocence. Some historians have found parallels to modern nationalist revolutionary movements. Additionally, Murray Bookchin argued that Tábor was an early example of anarcho-communism.

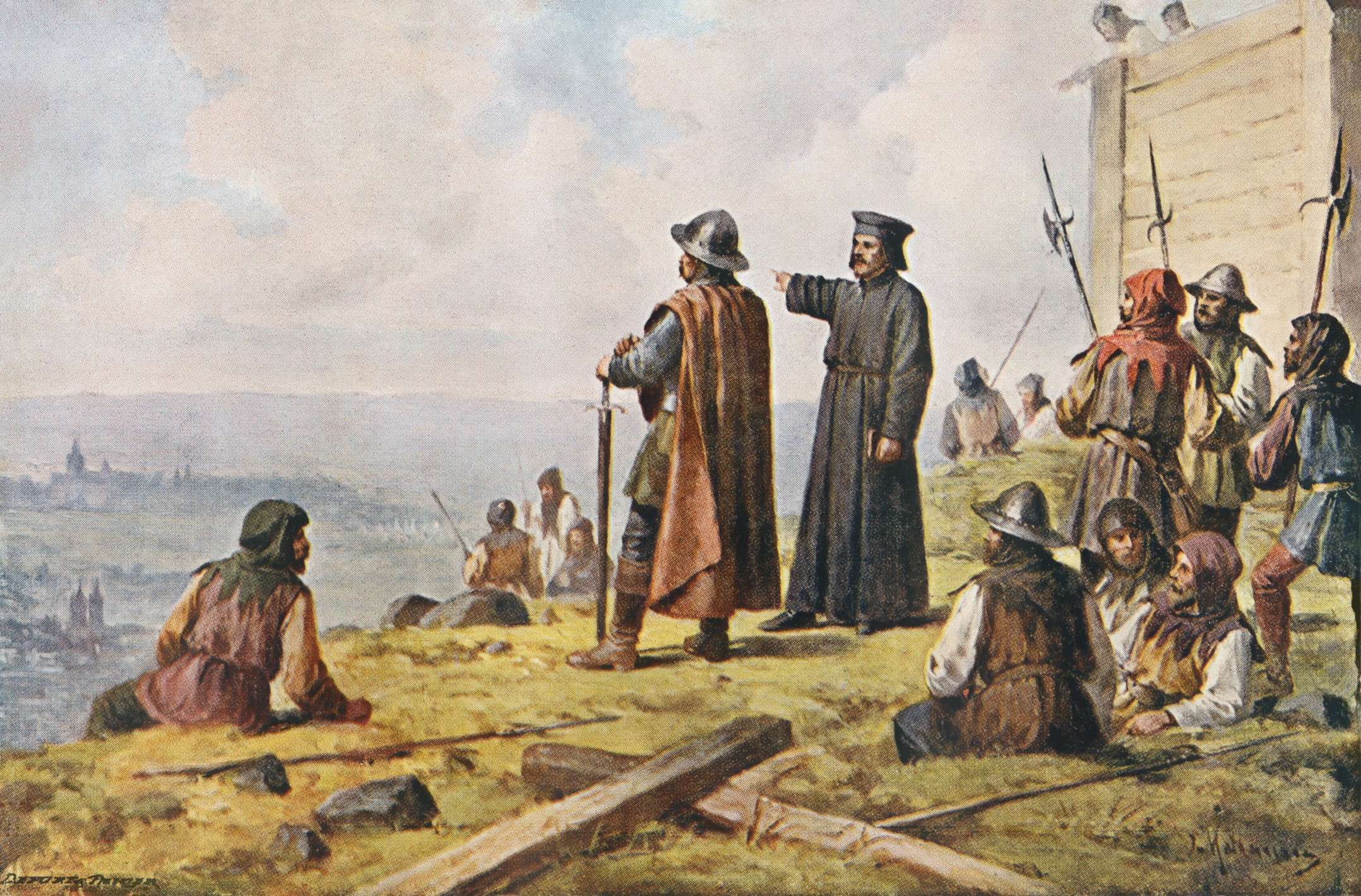
Jan Žižka with Václav Koranda at Vítkov

Hussites from Plzeň came to Tábor under the guidance of Břeňek Švihovský and Jan Žižka of Trocnov. These Hussites were attacked by Catholic knights near Sudoměř on 25 March 1420. The repulsion of the knights encouraged the Hussites, and they managed to reach Tábor, which was still under construction. The Taborites chose four military commanders (Hetmans) from among themselves: Jan Žižka, Mikuláš of Hus, Chval Řepický of Machovice and Zbyněk z Buchov. Under their leadership, the Taborites made many sorties in South Bohemia, and at the end of May 1420, they headed towards Prague, threatened by Catholic armies during the first anti-Hussite crusade. In June, Tábor was unsuccessfully besieged by the troops of a South Bohemian noble, Oldřich II of Rosenberg. Cavalry led by the governor Mikuláš of Hus dispersed the siege. On 14 July near Prague, there was the Battle of Vítkov Hill in which Jan Žižka managed to thwart an attempt by Hungary and Sigismund, Holy Roman Emperor to dominate the capital. The crusade then disintegrated without further struggle. In July, the Hussites negotiated about a possible future successor to the Czech throne. In response to the Four Articles of Prague, the Taborites published twelve revolutionary articles in Prague. However, the Praguers did not meet their demands and the troops left the city.

At the end of August, Jan Žižka launched a large offensive against the estate of Oldřich of Rosenberg. The governor seized Prachatice, Vodňany and Lomnice. Young Oldřich was forced to conclude a ceasefire with Tábor until February 1421. Mikuláš of Pelhřimov was elected bishop of Tábor in September 1420. In December, Hetman Nicholas of Hus died as a result of a fall from a horse. The leader of the Taborites was now the governor Jan Žižka of Trocnov.

Adolf Liebscher: The Taborites conquering Prachatice

Burning Adamites

Jan Žižka commanded his rag-tag Bohemian army in defense against the crusading Imperial Army under Emperor Sigismund. Žižka did not believe that all prisoners should be slain and often showed clemency to those he defeated. After one battle, when his army disobeyed him and killed many prisoners, Žižka ordered the army to pray for forgiveness. That experience partly inspired him to write a famous military code of conduct, "Žižkův vojenský řád" – a document partly inspired by the biblical book of Deuteronomy. Žižka eventually left Tabor because that community became too radical for his beliefs and took over the leadership of the more moderate Orebites in Hradec Králové. In response to the numerous attacks launched against Bohemia, the Taborites and Orebites often set aside their religious differences and cooperated militarily.

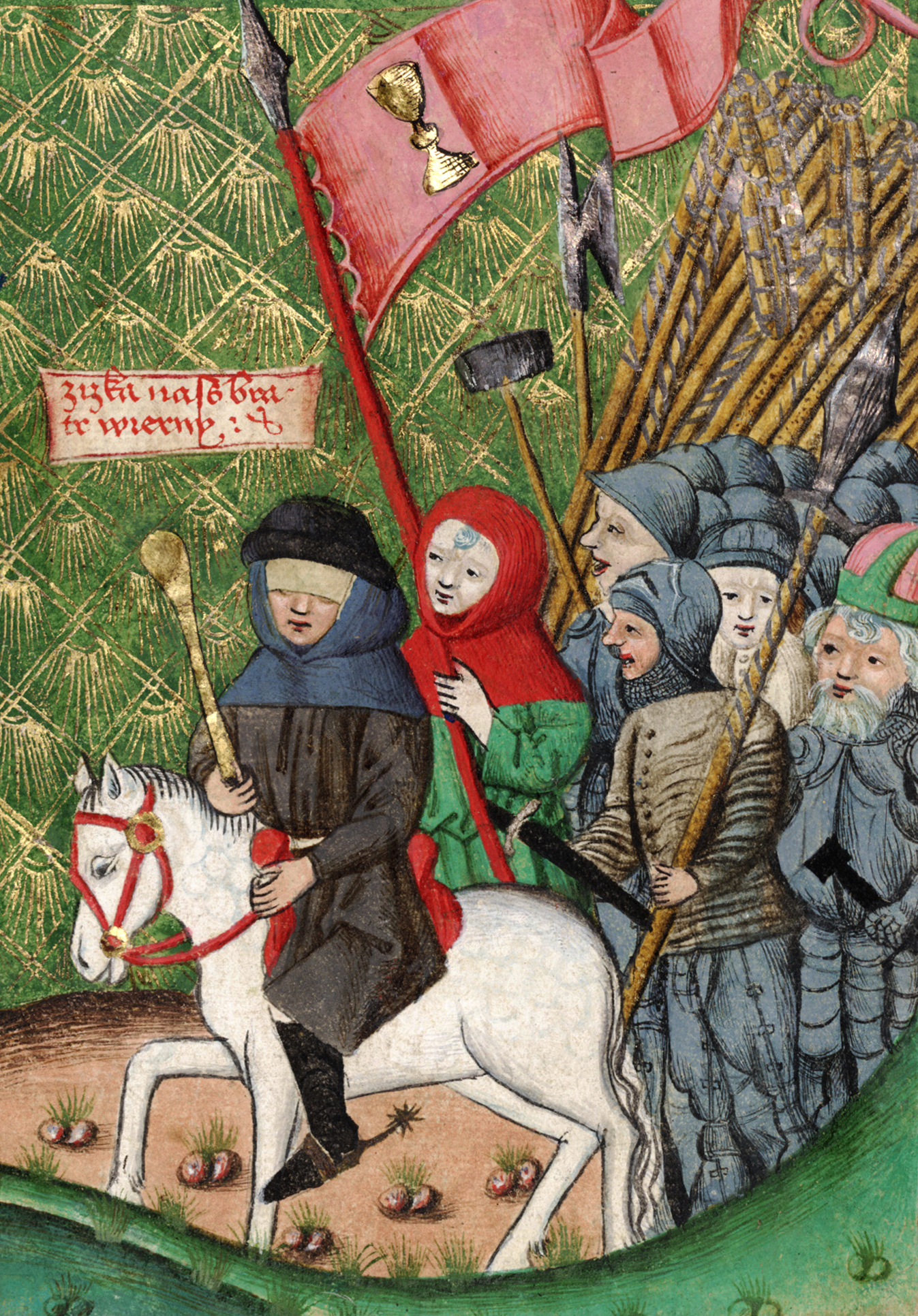
Jan Žižka leading troops of the Hussites; Jena Codex, 15th century

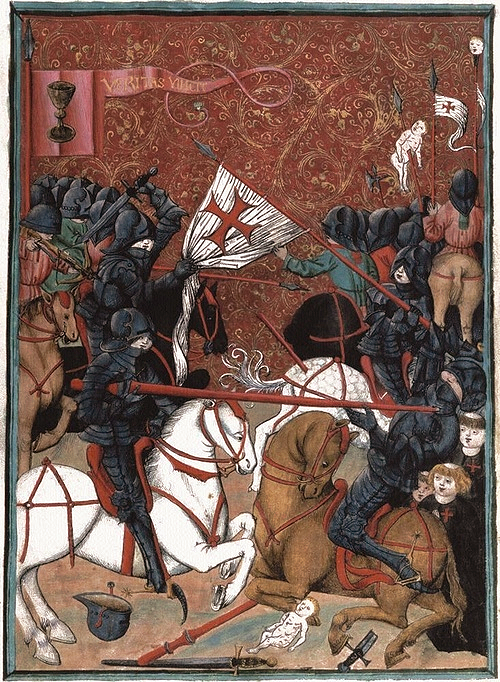
Battle between the Hussites and crusaders; Jena Codex, 15th century

Once the external threat was removed by Hussite victories, the various Hussite factions turned on each other. At the beginning of 1421, the Adamites, who completely rejected the Eucharist, were expelled from Tábor. Under the leadership of priests Petr Kániš and Martin Húska, they settled in the Příběnice Castle, where the Adamites fell. Žižka suppressed their movement, and most sectarians, including both leaders, were then burnt as heretics under his orders. During the winter offensive in West Bohemia, the Taborites managed to seize Chomutov. The joint campaign of Taborites and Praguers into East Bohemia under Jan Žižka's command was also successful and the towns Dvůr Králové, Polička and Vysoké Mýto fell into the Hussite hands. At the turn of 1421 and 1422, there was a battle, in which the blind governor managed to overwhelm King Sigismund of Luxembourg. At the end of April, the Lithuanian Grand Duke Vytautas arrived in Bohemia, where he was recognized (mostly by the Hussites and Taborites) as the country's steward. In January 1423, Jan Žižka of Trocnov broke with the Tábor union and began to build Nový Tábor (New Tábor) in East Bohemia.

Josef Mathauser: Battle of Lipany

After Jan Žižka's death on 11 October 1424, Jan Hvězda of Vícemilice and Bohuslav of Švamberk took the lead of the Taborite forces. The combined forces of Taborites, Sirotci and Praguers decisively defeated mercenaries from Saxony, Thuringia, Lusatia and Meissen in the Battle of Usti on 16 June 1426. Under the leadership of Prokop Holý, the combined troops of the Taborites and Sirotci defeated Albrecht II in the Battle of the Light. The Taborites in conjunction with the Sirotci and the Prague Union turned to flee from the Third and Fourth Crusades against the Hussites, in the battles of the Tachov and the Domažlice. In addition, led by Prokop Holý, they set out on campaigns abroad (German parts of the Holy Roman Empire, Austria, Upper and Lower Lusatia, Silesia, and Upper Hungary). In the spring of 1433, the council of Tábor at the Council of Basel was represented by Nicholas of Pelhřimov, who advocated the article on punishment of deadly sins. In the summer of 1433, the Taborites joined the siege of Catholic Plzeň. The city, however, defended well and Hussite troops were forced to abandon the ineffective siege. Finally, after twenty years, the power of the Taborites was broken with the Battle of Lipany on 30 May 1434, during which 13,000 of the 18,000-strong army of Taborites and Sirotci, led by Prokop Holý, were overwhelmingly defeated by the united Catholic forces. Under the weight of this defeat, the Sirotci's union completely disappeared. Many of the leading Taborite commanders fell in battle, including the leading priest Prokop Holý.

Banner used by Taborites (hypothetical colors)

After the Battle of Lipany, the opposition to King Sigismund and the agreement with the Council was led by governor Jan Roháč of Dubá. However, after the Taborites lost several of their castles and were defeated on 19 August 1435 by Oldřich of Rožmberk in the Battle of Křeč, the moderate wing, led by Bedřich of Strážnice, took over the Táborite faction. Jan Roháč and his faithful fortified at his castle Zion, which was soon conquered and all the surviving defenders were hanged in the Old Town Square of Prague. On 25 January 1437, by mutual agreement with Sigismund, Tábor was promoted to royal town and received the town's coat of arms: an imperial eagle. On 8 February 1449, the remnants of the Taborite union were joined with the Catholic and Utraquist nobility from South Bohemia, and so the so-called Strakonice Unity was established, which was directed against the ever-growing power of George of Poděbrady. On 1 September 1452, the town of Tábor was suddenly occupied by the army of the land administrator George of Poděbrady, and thus the independent political power of the Tábor union was ended.

== See also ==
- Peter Payne
- Wars of Religion
