= Hussites of Žatec and Louny =

Large military group of the Kingdom of Bohemia

The common military banner of Hussites with colors according to the Jena Codex from the 15th century

Hussites of Žatec and Louny, officially Union of Žatec and Louny (Czech: Žatecko-lounský svaz), were a large military group of Hussites of Bohemia notable for defeating a large imperial army sent to pacify them by Sigismund, Holy Roman Emperor on request of the Papacy in October 1421. The Hussite councillors seized power in the towns through coups. These followed the radicalisation of the situation in the country after the Prague defenestration and the death of King Wenceslas IV in August 1419. The first organisation of a town union between Louny and Žatec also dates back to this time.

This struggle became known as the second crusade against the Hussites. Their victory paved the way for a further Hussite takeover of the Kingdom of Bohemia.
