= Bohemian Reformation =

Protestant movement of the 15th century

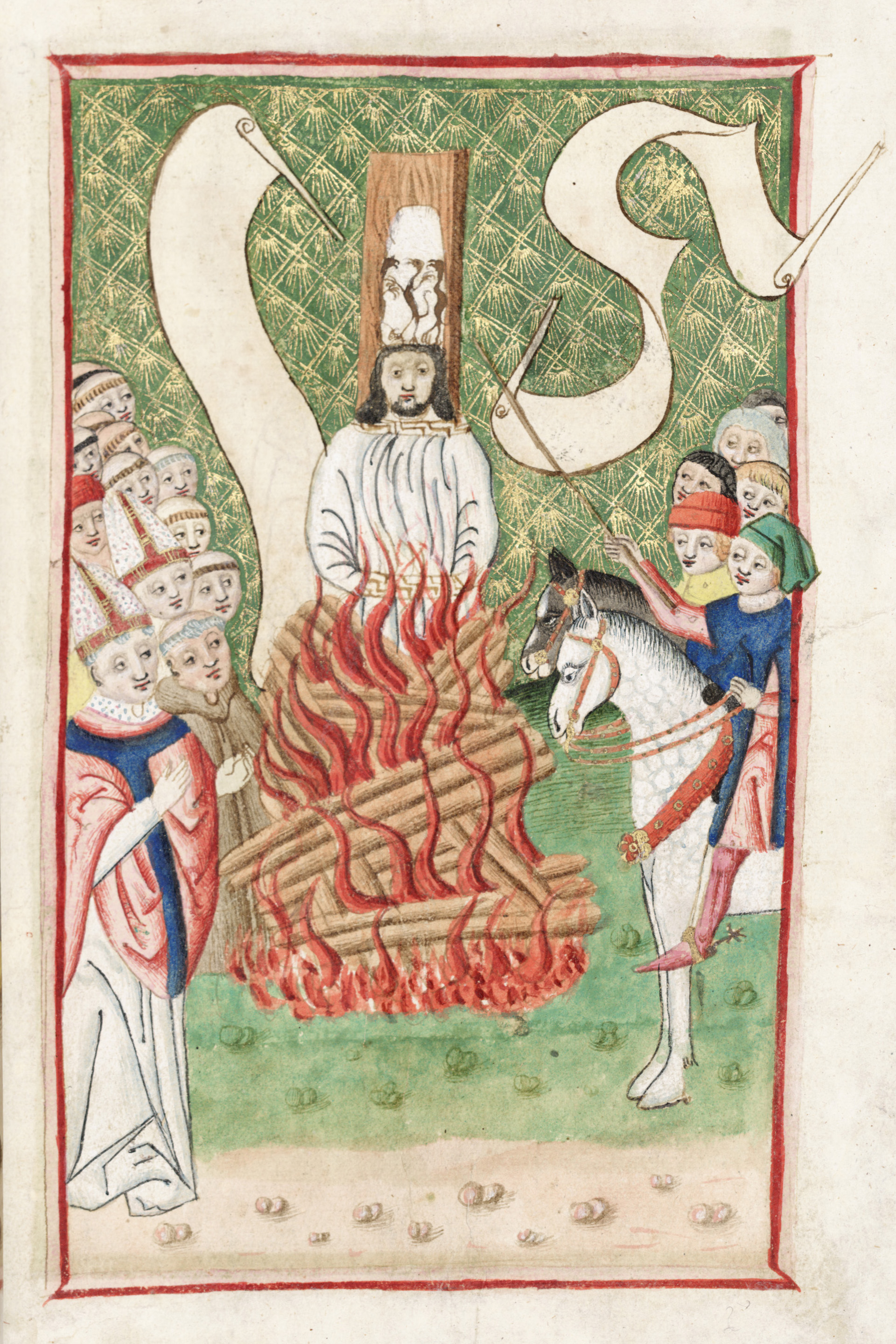
Jan Hus at the stake

The spread of reformation movements in 16th-century Europe (Bohemian Reformation in orange)

The Bohemian Reformation (also known as the Czech Reformation or Hussite Reformation), preceding the Reformation of the 16th century, was a Christian movement in the late medieval and early modern Kingdom and Crown of Bohemia (mostly what is now present-day Czech Republic, Silesia, and Lusatia) striving for a reform of the Catholic Church. Lasting for more than 200 years, it had a significant impact on the historical development of Central Europe and is considered one of the most important religious, social, intellectual and political movements of the early modern period. The Bohemian Reformation produced the first national church separate from Roman authority in the history of Western Christianity, the first apocalyptic religious movement of the early modern period, and the first pacifist Protestant church.

The Bohemian Reformation included several theological strains that developed over time. Although it split into many groups, some characteristics were shared by all of them – communion under both kinds, distaste for the wealth and power of the church, emphasis on the Bible preached in a vernacular language and on an immediate relationship between man and God. The Bohemian Reformation included particularly the efforts to reform the church before Jan Hus, the Hussite movement (including e.g. Taborites and Orebites), the Unity of the Brethren and Utraquists or Calixtines.

Together with the Waldensians, Arnoldists and the Lollards (led by John Wycliffe), the Bohemian Reformation's Hussite movement is considered to be the precursor to the Protestant Reformation. These movements are sometimes referred to as the First Reformation in the Czech historiography.

The Bohemian Reformation remained distinct from the German and Swiss Reformations despite their influence, although many Czech Utraquists grew close to the Lutherans. The Bohemian Reformation kept its own development until the suppression of the Bohemian Revolt in 1620. The restored King Ferdinand II decided to force every inhabitant of Bohemia and Moravia to become Catholic in accordance with the principle cuius regio, eius religio of the Peace of Augsburg (1555). The Bohemian Reformation ended up being diffused in the Protestant world and gradually lost its distinctiveness.

The Patent of Toleration issued in 1781 by Emperor Joseph II made Lutheran, Calvinist and Eastern Orthodox faiths legal in his realm but did not go so far as general religious toleration. Despite the eradication of the Bohemian Reformation as a distinctive Christian movement, its tradition survived. Many churches (not only in the Czech Republic) remember their legacy, refer to the Bohemian Reformation and try to continue its tradition, e.g., the Moravian Church (the continuator of the scattered Unity of the Brethren), Evangelical Church of Czech Brethren, Czechoslovak Hussite Church, Church of Brethren, Unity of Brethren Baptists and other denominations.

== History ==
=== Origins ===
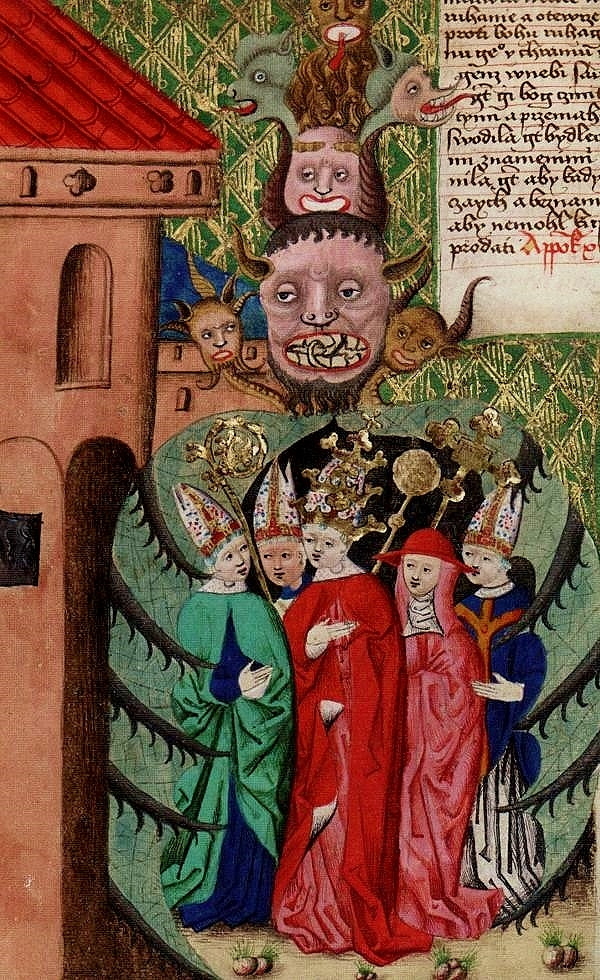
The pope with a cardinal and bishops as representatives of the decadent church in an embrace of the apocalyptic beast

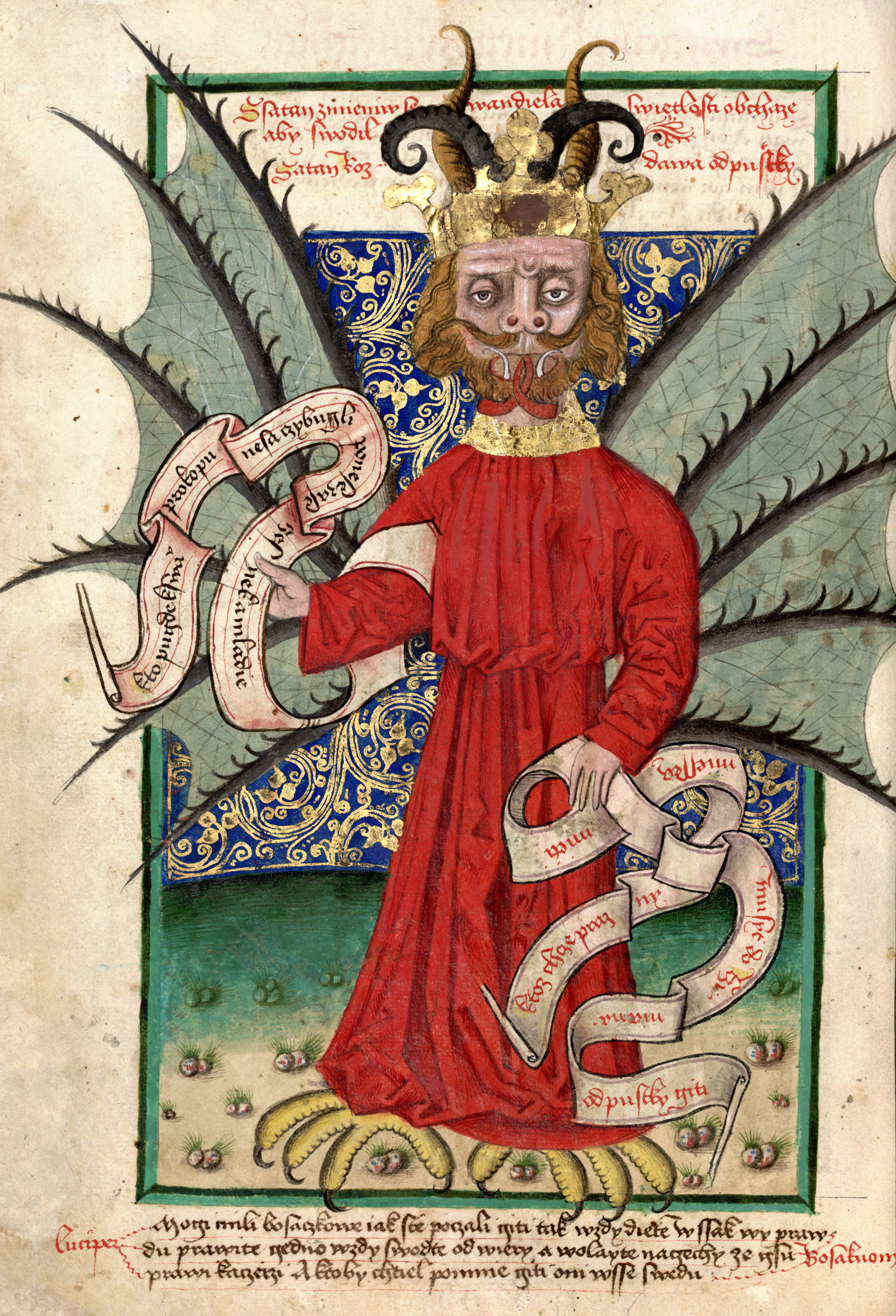
Satan selling indulgences

The Bohemian Reformation started in Prague in the second half of the 14th century. In that time Prague was the seat of the King of Bohemia as well as of the Holy Roman Emperor (and King of the Romans). Prague was one of Europe's largest cities and had a high concentration of clergy in Western Christendom. The beginnings of the Bohemian Reformation were closely related to the criticism of the lavish lifestyle of many priests. In the late 1370s and early 1380s the Prague university theologians and intellectuals called for the reform of the decadent priesthood in the spirit of emerging conciliarism, for education of unsatisfactorily educated priests, and for more frequent accepting of the Eucharist in the spirit of Devotio Moderna. The most significant representatives of the university reform movement were Henry of Bitterfeld (Heinrich von Bitterfeld) and Matthew of Cracow.

Apart from the university theologians there were also reform preachers, such as Conrad Waldhauser, a 14th century Austrian Augustinian from a monastery in Waldhausen who preached in the Old Town of Prague in German and Latin especially against simony and low morals. Another influential preacher was Milíč of Kroměříž who preached in Latin, Czech, and German. He helped many prostitutes to begin a new life. He served the Eucharist daily which was very uncommon because the laymen took communion usually only once per year. This practice of frequent communion became very popular. Although it was unique elsewhere in Europe, it became usual in Bohemia until the end of the 14th century. The matter of the Eucharist became crucial for the nascent Bohemian Reformation, and in the 1410s communion under both kinds and infant communion were introduced into Bohemian liturgical practice.

Matthias of Janov who studied at the University of Prague and at the University of Paris wrote Regulae Veteris et Novi Testamenti (Principles of the Old and the New Testaments) which is an essential book of the early Bohemian Reformation movement. The Bible was the only reliable authority in all matters of faith for him, and only sincere followers of Christ were true Christians in his opinion.

The complete translation of the Bible into Czech in the mid-14th century also contributed to the origin of the Bohemian Reformation. After French and Italian, Czech became the third modern European language in which the whole Bible was translated.

=== Jan Hus ===
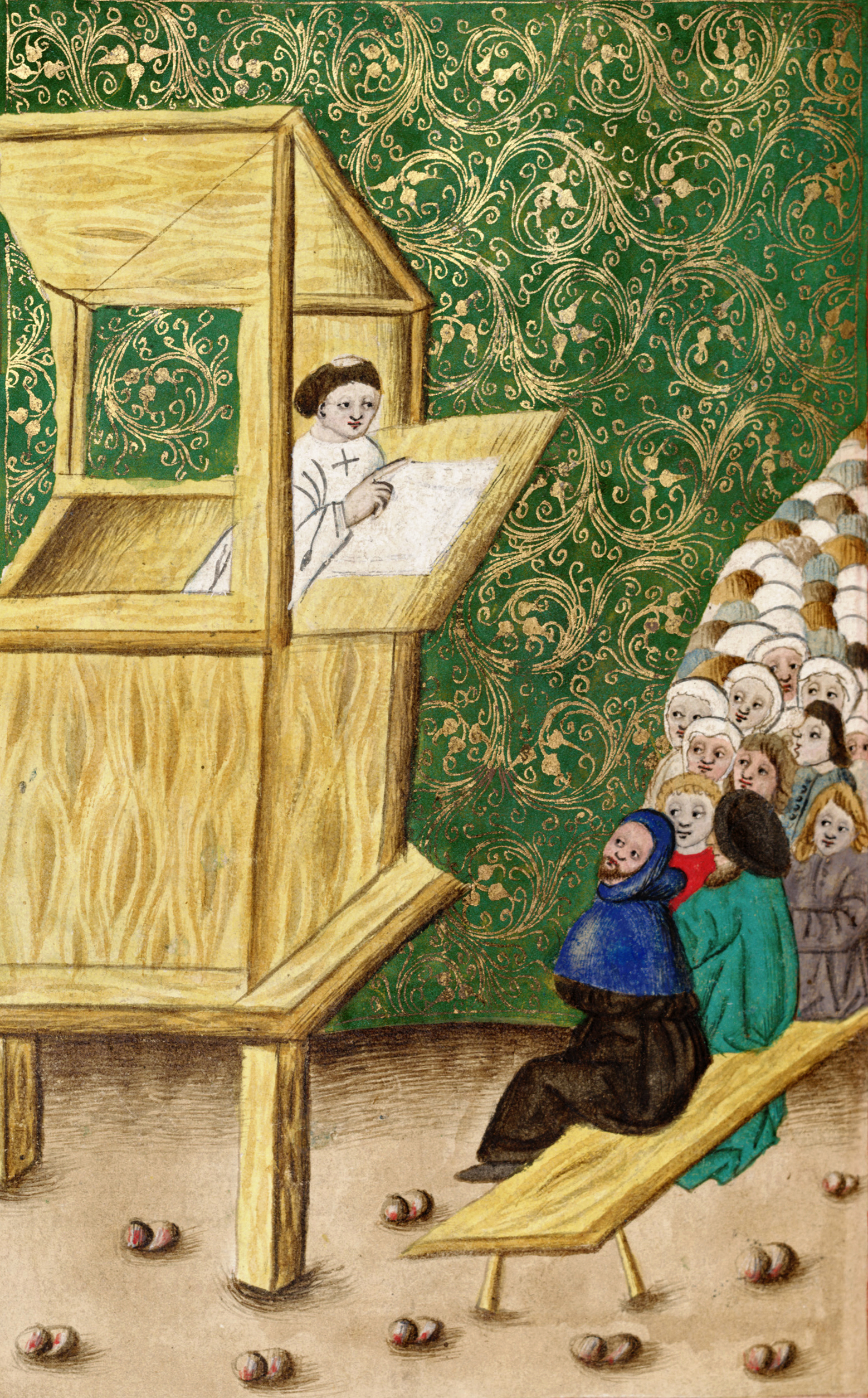
Jan Hus preaching

The best-known representative of the Bohemian Reformation is Jan Hus. He was an influential university teacher and a popular preacher in Bethlehem Chapel in the Old Town of Prague. The chapel was founded already in 1391 in the spirit of the nascent Bohemian Reformation. It was intended solely for sermons in Czech and it could admit 3,000 people. Hus and his friends (e. g. Jacob of Mies) were skeptical about the idea of conciliarism which called for a church reform from above via cardinals and theologians. For them the cardinals and theologians were bearers of the same corruption as the papacy. Hus believed that the head of the Church was Jesus Christ rather than the pope. In some issues they were inspired by the ideas of Oxford theologian and philosopher John Wycliffe. It can be seen in their cooperation with the secular power which supported them. Together with Wycliffe they thought that aristocracy could help the church to become poor and focused only on spiritual issues by confiscation of its property. In 1412, Hus criticized selling indulgences which led to an unrest in Prague suppressed by the city council.

When Hus, as a result of an interdict, left Prague for the country, he realized what a gulf there was between university education and theological speculation on one hand, and the life of uneducated country priests and the laymen entrusted to their care on the other. Therefore, he started to write many texts in Czech, such as basics of the Christian faith or preachings, intended mainly for the priests whose knowledge of Latin was poor.

Before Hus left Prague, he decided to take a step which gave a new dimension to his endeavors. He no longer put his trust in an indecisive king, a hostile pope or an ineffective council. On 18 October 1412, he appealed to Jesus Christ as the supreme judge. By appealing directly to the highest Christian authority, Christ himself, he bypassed the laws and structures of the medieval Church. For the Bohemian Reformation, this step was as significant as the 95 theses by Martin Luther in 1517.

The execution of Hus at the Council of Constance in 1415 led only to a radicalization of his followers. In 1414, Jacob of Mies first served the holy communion under both kinds to laymen (which was forbidden by the Fourth Council of the Lateran in 1215) by the approval of Hus who already dwelt in Constance. Communion under both kinds represented by chalice became the main symbol of the Bohemian Reformation. Up to the present time the chalice is a symbol of non-Catholic Christians in the Czech Republic.

=== Hussites ===
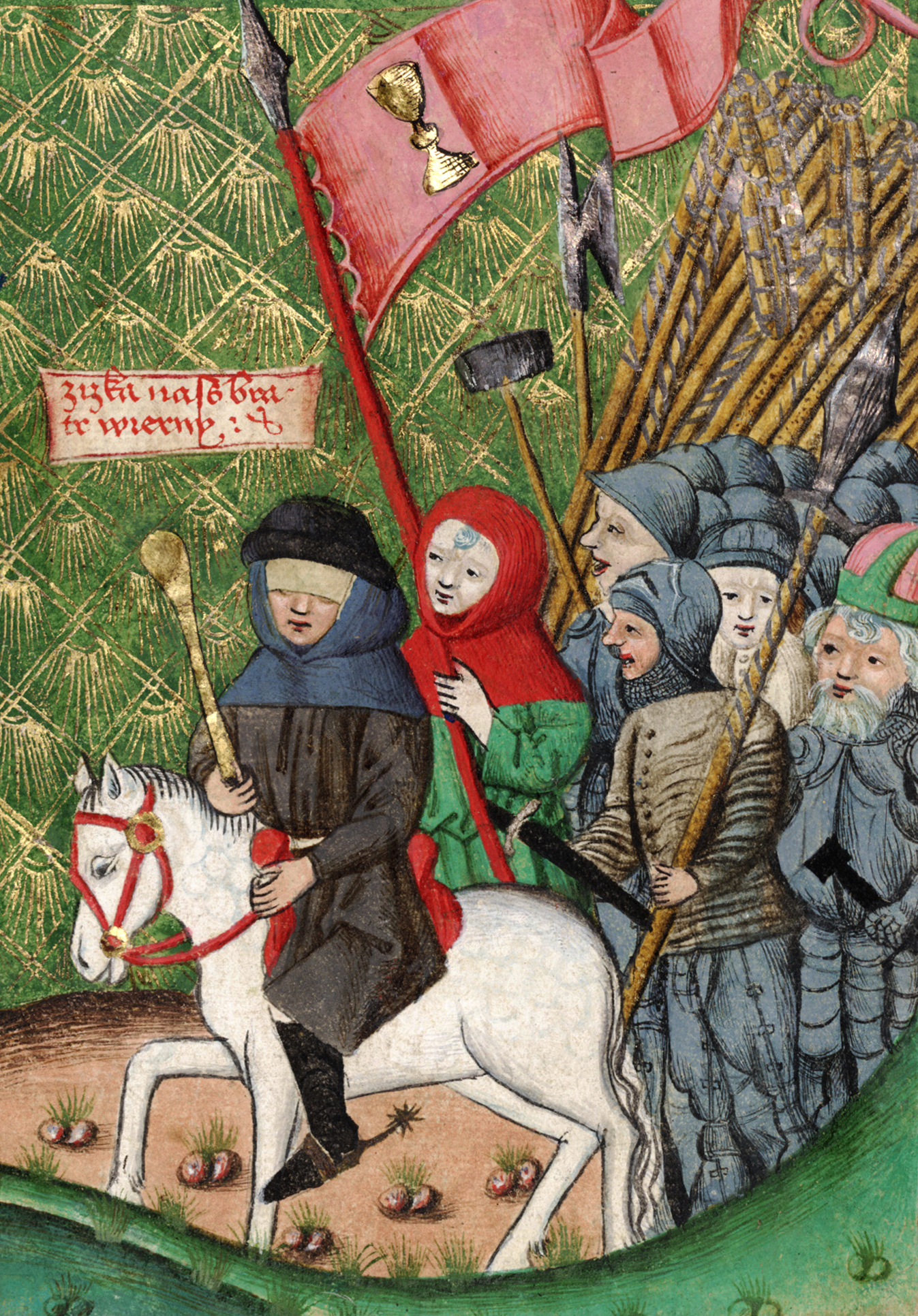
Jan Žižka leading troops of radical Hussites

After Hus was burnt at the stake, the Bohemian Reformation started to oppose the Council of Constance and later the pope, and became a distinctive religious movement with its own symbols (chalice), rituals (frequent communion under both kinds even for children), and martyrs (Hus, Jerome of Prague). In the 1420s it constituted a consciously independent church.

Because of the political situation the Hussites were a religious group that also became a political and military faction. The ideological and political program shared by the Hussites at the beginning of the Hussite Wars was contained in the Four Articles of Prague, which can be summarized as:

1. Freedom to preach the Word of God.
2. Freedom of the communion of the chalice (under both kinds also to laity).
3. Exclusion of the clergy from large temporal possessions or civil authority.
4. Strict repression and punishment of a mortal sin, whether in clergy or in laity.

In the summer of 1419, tens of thousands of people gathered for a massive outdoor religious service on a hill christened Mount Tabor, where the town Tábor was founded. The so-called Taborites practiced a form of communal economy that has been of great interest to Marxist historians.

After the Battle of Lipany in 1434, in which the moderate Hussites united with Catholics defeated the radical Hussites, a compromise with the Roman Church and the emperor and crowned Bohemian King Sigismund could have been realized. The compromise led to reconciliation of the Bohemian reformed mainstream with the Roman Church. The text of Compactata based on the Four Articles of Prague was accepted by the Czech (Bohemian and Moravian) political representation as well as by the Council of Basel, but the pope refused to recognize it.

==== Bohemian Utraquist Church ====
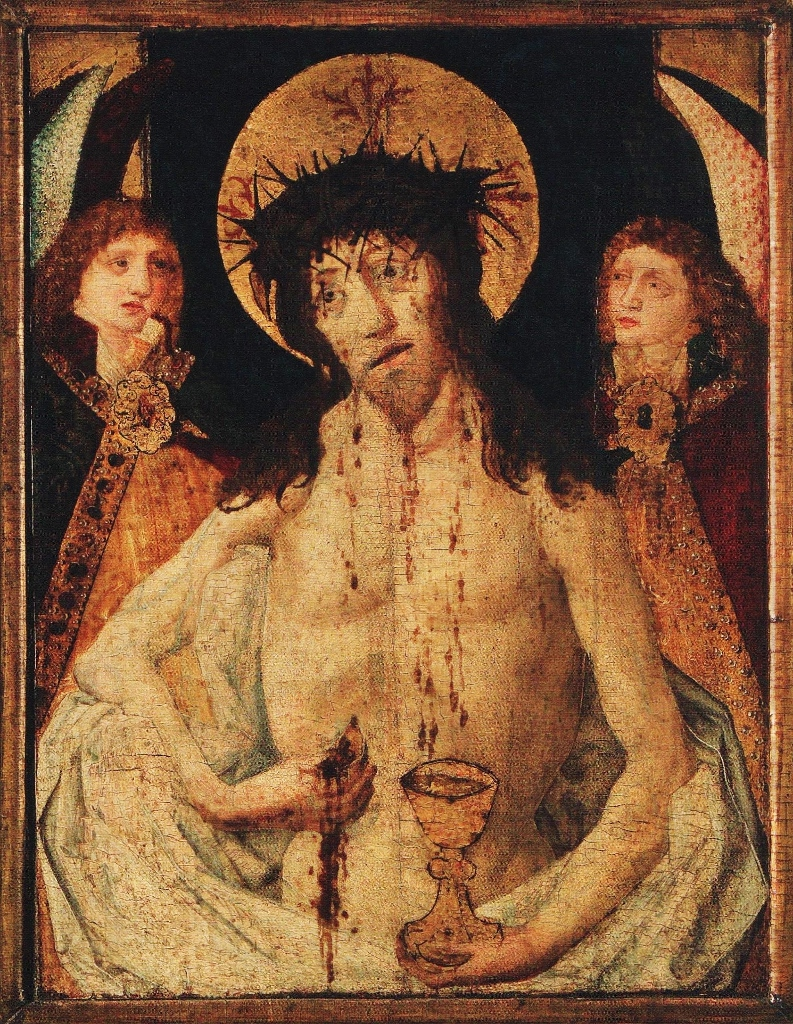
Man of Sorrows from the main Utraquist Church of Our Lady before Týn in Prague. It is a crucial artistic work of the Bohemian Reformation of the late 15th century. Christ touches the wound in his left flank, from which he takes a host (his body) while his blood flows into a chalice. The chalice – symbol of the Hussites – clearly demonstrates the practice of receiving the communion under both kinds.

The Utraquist Church of Bohemia was an autonomous ecclesial body which emerged in Bohemia and Moravia, that viewed itself as a part of the one, holy, catholic Church, but that remained in a merely formal communion with the Roman pope. During the 15th century it maintained an ambition to serve as a vanguard of reform for all Western Christendom. For a long time, this church – schismatic from the Roman point of view – remained a unique phenomenon in Europe. Until 1471, the church was led by the elected Archbishop of Prague, Jan Rokycana, who was never confirmed by the Holy See. After his death it was led by the Utraquist Consistory headed by the administrator. The Utraquist Consistory had its seat in the Old Town of Prague. The church continued to recognize the apostolic succession in the Roman Church and insisted on the ordination of its clergy by "proper" Catholic bishops. With its intermediate position between Rome and the Radical and Protestant Reformations, the Utraquist Church of Bohemia resembled the future Church of England.

The church was largely Czech-speaking, although it included some German-speaking parish communities as well. With the emergence of the Protestant Reformation the Utraquist Church found it necessary to define its identity in relation to Rome as well as to the reformed churches. During the 16th century Bohemia and Moravia enjoyed a considerable religious tolerance that was not limited by the principle cuius regio, eius religio. Defense of its own identity was a major problem of the Utraquist Church for the remaining period of its existence – roughly until 1622. The joining of the Utraquists with the Brethren and the Lutherans in support of the Bohemian Confession (Confessio Bohemica, 1575) could not but antagonize Rome further. In consequence of Letter of Majesty, issued in 1609 by Rudolf II, an illusory unified church organization emerged that further complicated the ecclesiological issue for the Utraquists, as well as for the Lutherans and, especially the Brethren.

The main expression of its confessional distinctiveness was a reformed liturgy that combined Latin and Czech, and practiced communion under both kinds for the laity of all ages, including little children as well as infants. Hus was considered a saint and venerated as a martyr in the cause of a renewal of Christ's Church. However better knowledge of Utraquist theology belongs among the major desiderata of historical scholarship.

=== Czech (Bohemian, Moravian) Brethren ===
The Unity of the Brethren (Latin: Unitas fratrum, Czech: Jednota bratrská) was founded in 1457 by Hussites who were disappointed by the religious development in their country, especially by the Hussite Wars which were led in the name of God. They were strongly impacted by the teaching of Petr Chelčický, and the early Unity was also in touch with the Waldensians. The Bohemian Brethren were known for their radical biblicism. After a certain amount of hesitation they decided to deny the apostolic succession and to establish a distinct church. Considered to be heretics and persecuted by both Catholics and Utraquists (Hussites, Calixtines) they became tolerant to other Christian denominations. They did not believe themselves to be the only true church. They even did not want to be called a church but used the term unity to describe their denomination, for they believed there was only one Church of Christ which was invisible.

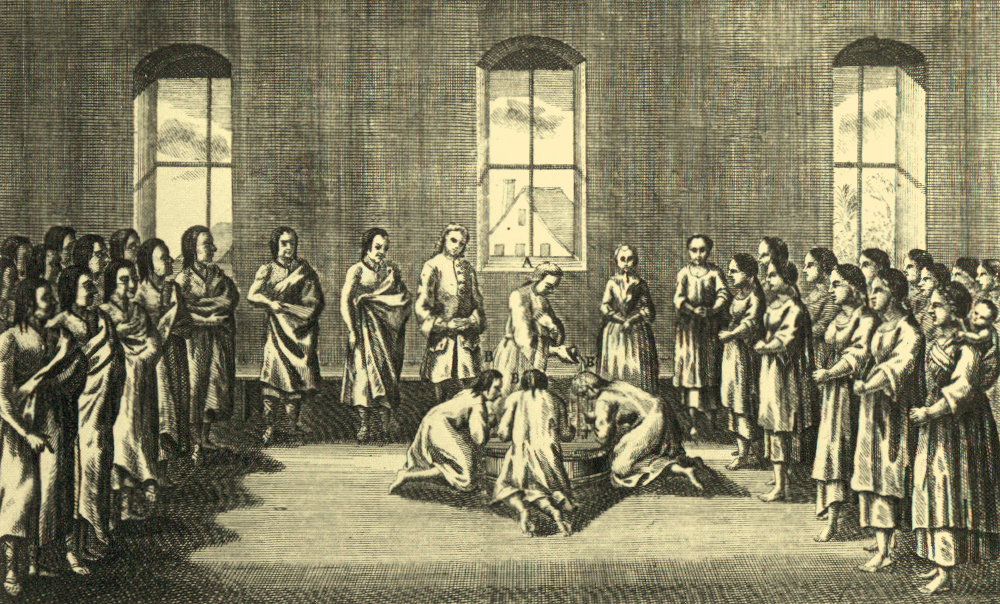
Moravian missionary baptising Native Americans in Bethlehem, Pennsylvania

The Unity of the Brethren executed the first Czech Bible translation from the original languages. This work was initiated by Brethren bishop Jan Blahoslav who translated the New Testament from Greek in 1564. The complete Bible was published in six volumes between 1579 and 1593 with extensive annotations. It was printed in a Moravian fortified house in Kralice nad Oslavou, therefore it is called the Kralice Bible. It was the first Czech Bible in which the verses were numbered.

The Brethren introduced the sacred song in the vernacular language as a basic element of the church service. Although the Unity of the Brethren was just a small religious group, its contribution for the development of the Czech monophonic sacred song is indisputable. Their first hymnal (in Czech) was printed in 1501 as the first printed hymnal in the whole Christian world (containing 89 hymns without tunes). During the 16th and early 17th century, the Unity became the foremost producer of hymns in Czech lands. The Unity printed some eleven different hymnals (in 28 publications) in Czech, German, and Polish, most including tunes as well as words. The first German-language Unity hymnal edited in 1531 by Michael Weisse had 157 hymns with tunes. In 1541 Jan Roh edited a new Czech hymnal containing 482 hymns with tunes, and in 1544, he issued a new revised edition of the German hymnal of 1531. Unity's best known Czech-language hymnbooks were printed in Ivančice (1561) and Szamotuły (1564) under the supervision of Jan Blahoslav. The hymnal of 1561 contained 735 hymn texts and over 450 melodies. That makes the importance of hymn singing in the Unity very clear. The Bohemian Brethren later also used the Genevan Psalter translated into Czech by Jiří Strejc in 1587.

Apart from Jan Blahoslav, other famous theologians of the Unity were Luke of Prague, Jan Augusta or John Amos Comenius. During the time of the intransigent Counter-Reformation in Bohemia and Moravia after 1620, the leaders of the Unity were forced to leave the country. Comenius tried to lead the Unity in exile but after his death it was in decline. In 1722 the Unity of the Brethren was renewed in Saxony by emigrants from Moravia with support of a local count Nikolaus Ludwig von Zinzendorf. Since that time the Unity has also been known as the Moravian Church.

== See also ==
- Western Schism

== Bibliography ==
- Betts, R. R. (April 1947). "The place of the Czech reform movement in the history of Europe". The Slavonic and East European Review. 25 (65).
- Brown, M. T. (2013). John Blahoslav – Sixteenth-Century Moravian Reformer Transforming the Czech Nation by the Word of God. Bonn: Verlag für Kultur und Wissenschaft. ISBN 978-3-86269-063-3.
- David, Zdeněk V. (2003). Finding the middle way : the Utraquists' liberal challenge to Rome and Luther. Baltimore (Md.): the J. Hopkins university press. ISBN 978-0-8018-7382-9.
- Fudge, Thomas A. (1998). The magnificent ride : the first reformation in Hussite Bohemia. Aldershot: Ashgate. ISBN 978-1-85928-372-1.
- Fudge, Thomas A. (2010). Jan Hus Religious Reform and Social Revolution in Bohemia. London: I.B. Tauris & Co. ISBN 978-0-85771-855-6.
- Fudge, Thomas A. (2016). Jerome of Prague and the Foundations of the Hussite Movement. New York: Oxford University Press. ISBN 9780190631550.
- Gillett, E. H. (1863). The life and times of John Huss: or, The Bohemian reformation of the fifteenth century. Volume 1. Boston: Gould and Lincoln.
- Gillett, E. H. (1864). The life and times of John Huss: or, The Bohemian reformation of the fifteenth century. Volume 2. Boston: Gould and Lincoln.
- Grant, Jeanne (2014). For the Common Good : The Bohemian Land Law and the Beginning of the Hussite Revolution. Leiden: Brill. ISBN 9789004283268.
- Haberkern, Phillip N. (2016). Patron Saint and Prophet: Jan Hus in the Bohemian and German Reformations. Oxford University Press. ISBN 9780190613976.
- Kaminsky, Howard (2004). A history of the Hussite revolution. Eugene, Or.: Wipf and Stock Publishers. ISBN 978-1-59244-631-5.
- McBride, Stephen Turnbull; illustrated by Angus (2004). The Hussite Wars 1419–36. Oxford: Osprey Publishing Ltd. ISBN 978-1-84176-665-2. Archived from the original on 2016-04-24.
- Zeman, J. K. (1973). "The Rise of Religious Liberty in the Czech Reformation". Central European History. 6 (2): 128–147. doi:10.1017/S0008938900015922. S2CID 145651918.
