= Leskovec-Dresden Bible =

Leskovec-Dresden Bible or Dresden Bible (Bible leskovecko-drážďanská or Bible drážďanská) was the oldest known manuscript with the complete Bible translation from Latin into Czech language, and the oldest complete Bible in any of the Slavic languages.

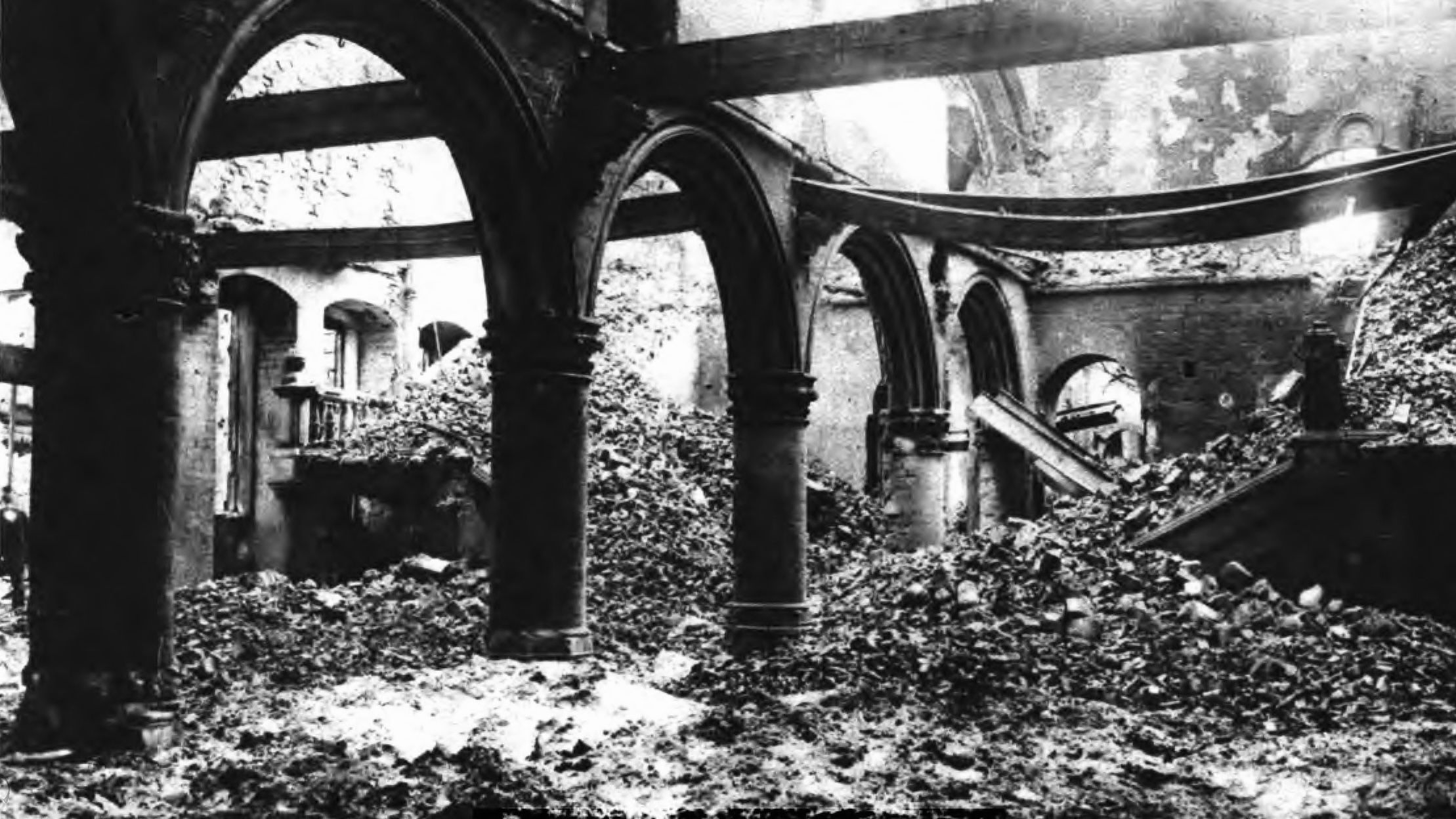
Destruction of the library of the Catholic University of Leuven, 1914

The bible was written approximately within the period of 1365–1375 (though this date might not be correct since Holy Roman Emperor stationed in Prague during this time, Charles IV, forbade translating Scripture).

In 1914 it was destroyed by fire in Leuven (Louvain), Belgium, where it had been sent to be photocopied during the sack of Leuven by German forces. One third of the text survived in black and white photographs and copies.

== Bibliography ==
- Hans Rothe, Vladimír Kyas, Friedrich Scholz (eds.): Die alttschechische Dresdener Bibel. (Facsimile aufgrund der photographischen Aufnahmen von 1914 nach dem verbrannten Original aus dem 14. Jahrhundert.) Padeborn 1993.
- Jakub Sichálek: European Background: Czech Translations. In: Elizabeth Solopova (ed.): The Wycliffite Bible. Origin, History and Interpretation. Leiden & Boston, 2017, p. 66-84

== See also ==
- Bible translations into Czech
- Prague Bible
- Bible of Kralice
