= Kralice =

Kralice may refer to:

== Music ==
- Kraliçe, an album of Turkish singer Hande Yener

== Places in the Czech Republic ==
- Kralice, a village and part of Chlístovice in the Central Bohemian Region
- Kralice na Hané, a market town in the Olomouc Region
- Kralice nad Oslavou, a municipality and village in the Vysočina Region
  - Bible of Kralice (Kralice Bible), printed in the village

== See also ==
- Krallice, an American band
