= Rašović =

Rašović or Rasovic is a surname.

== People with the given name ==
- Branko Rašović (1942–2024), Yugoslav footballer
- Strahinja Rašović, Serbian water polo player
- Umihana Rasovic (born 1986), Swedish politician
- Viktor Rašović, Serbian water polo player
- Vuk Rašović, Serbian footballer

== See also ==
- Rašovice
- Radoviš
