= Mladá Vožice =

- Town
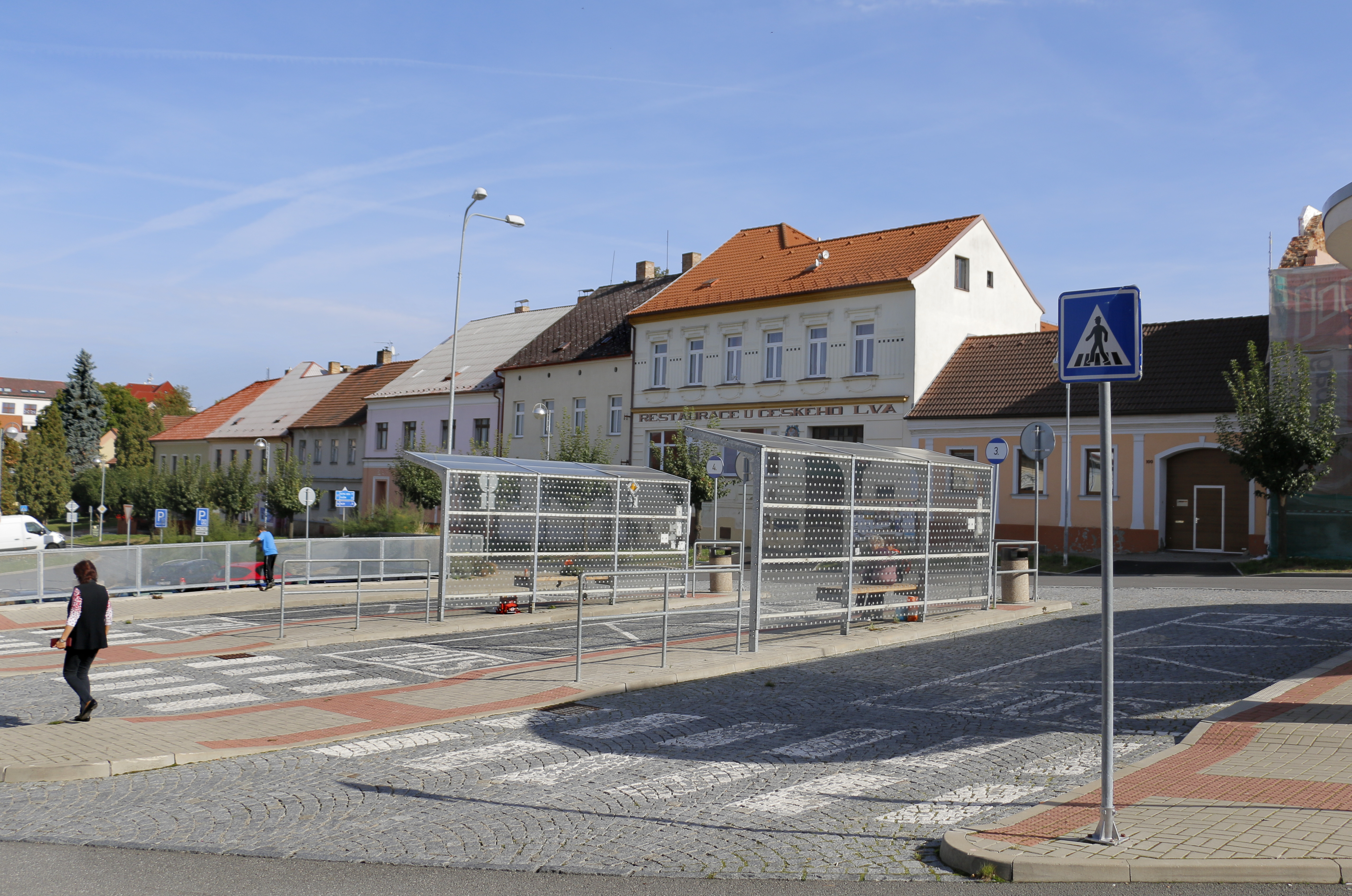
- The square Husovo náměstí

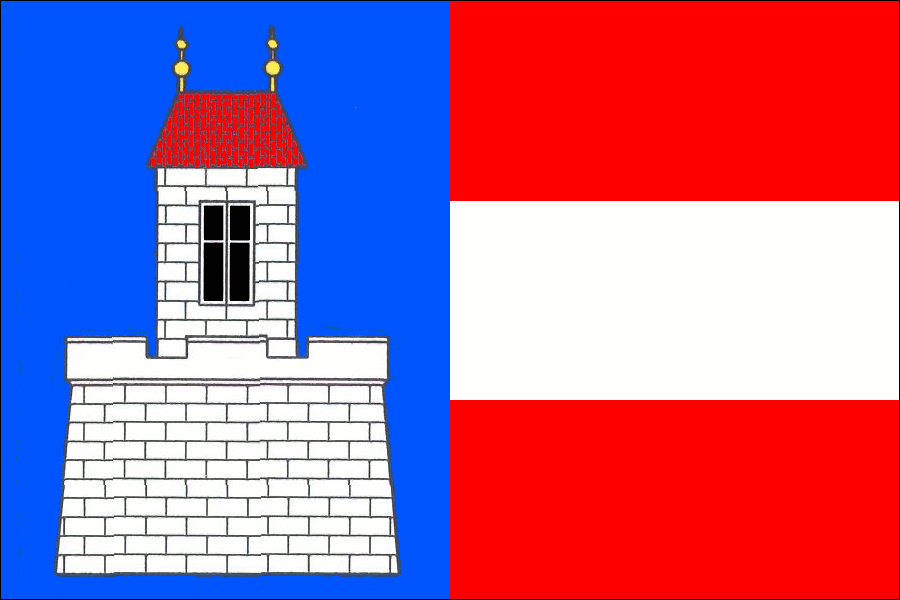
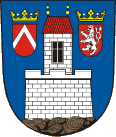
- Flag Coat of arms

- Location in the Czech Republic
- Coordinates: 49°31′59″N 14°48′31″E
- Country: Czech Republic
- Region: South Bohemian
- District: Tábor
- First mentioned: 1273

Government
  - Mayor: Jaroslav Větrovský

Area
  - Total: 31.59 km^{2} (12.20 sq mi)
- Elevation: 453 m (1,486 ft)

Population (2026-01-01)
  - Total: 2,711
  - Density: 85.82/km^{2} (222.3/sq mi)
- Time zone: UTC+1 (CET)
  - Summer (DST): UTC+2 (CEST)
- Postal code: 391 43
- Website: www.mu-vozice.cz

Mladá Vožice (Czech pronunciation: [ˈmladaː ˈvoʒɪtsɛ]; German: Jung Woschitz) is a town in Tábor District in the South Bohemian Region of the Czech Republic. It has about 2,700 inhabitants.

== Administrative division ==
Mladá Vožice consists of 15 municipal parts (in brackets population according to the 2021 census):

- Mladá Vožice (2,196)
- Bendovo Záhoří (10)
- Blanice (59)
- Chocov (28)
- Dolní Kouty (4)
- Dubina (8)
- Horní Kouty (13)
- Janov (26)
- Krchova Lomná (27)
- Noskov (111)
- Pavlov (17)
- Radvanov (45)
- Staniměřice (7)
- Stará Vožice (80)
- Ústějov (0)

== Etymology ==
The origin of the name Vožice is unknown. There is a theory that the name of the settlement could originally be Božice and be derived from the personal name Božut. The prefix mladá means 'young' (to distinguish it from Stará ['old'] Vožice).

== Geography ==
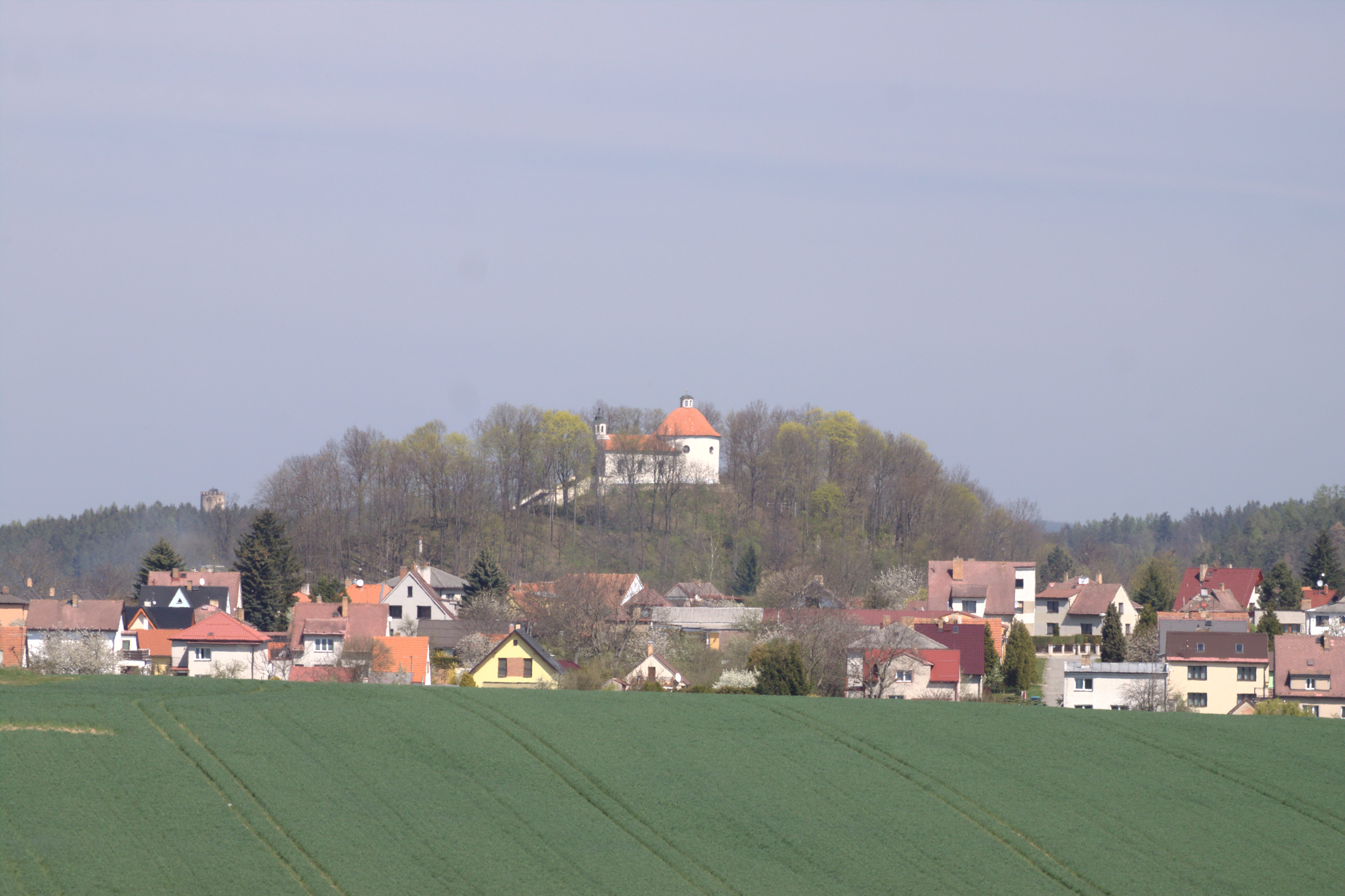
View from the south

Mladá Vožice is located about 17 kilometres (11 mi) northeast of Tábor and 60 km (37 mi) southeast of Prague. It lies mostly in the Vlašim Uplands. The southeastern part of the municipal territory extends into the Křemešník Highlands and includes the highest point of Mladá Vožice, the hill Bušová at 669 m (2,195 ft) above sea level. The town is situated on the Blanice River. There are several fishponds in the territory, the largest of which is Podhradní rybník.

== History ==
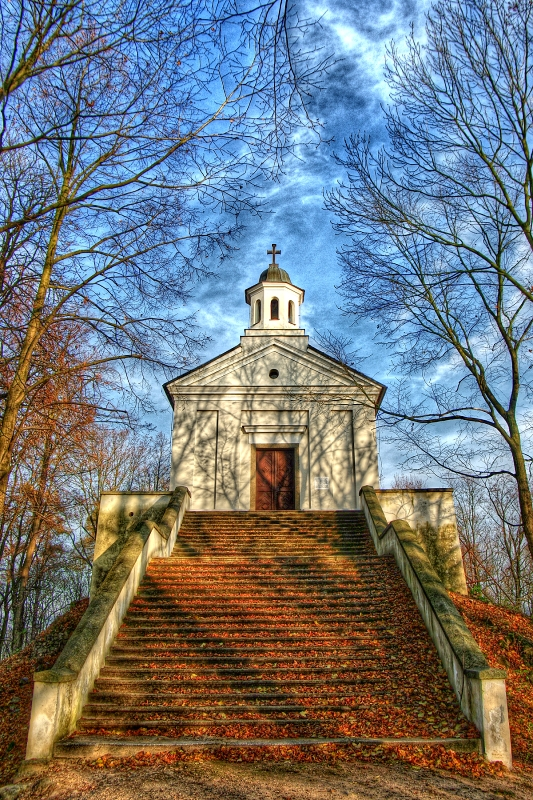
Church of the Assumption of the Virgin Mary

The area of today's Mladá Vožice began to settle between 711 and 796. Duke Spytihněv I founded here a castle for storing gold and silver which were mined here. The first written mention of Mladá Vožice is from 1273, when the probable first owner of the settlement, Stanimír of Vožice, was mentioned.

Mladá Vožice goods were probably owned by the royal chamber but were frequently pawned or lent to feudal lords for services to the king. One of the first ones was Vilém of Vožice who possessed the estate until 1318. From 1318 to 1425, Mladá Vožice was owned by the Lords of Landštejn, Lords of Janovice, Lords of Orlík, Lords of Pacov and the Ronovci family.

In March 1420, after the Battle of Sudoměř, Mladá Vožice was occupied by about 2,000 horse riders led by Mikeš Divůček of Jemniště, the master of the Kutná Hora mint. On Great Friday morning 1420, Jan Žižka attacked the town and set it on fire. Many lords were captured or killed and just those who had escaped to the castle got away with their lives. Žižka also seized a lot of horses for his army. In September 1425, the Hussites conquered the castle after five weeks' besiegement. They had the castle destroyed and it was never renewed.

Mladá Vožice was then acquired by Čeněk of Klinštejn, who sold half of Mladá Vožice to Oldřich of Kralovice and the second half to Mikuláš of Lípa. Mikuláš of Lípa then bought the second half and attached the town to the Vlašim estate. In 1548, the Voračický of Paběnice family bought the town from the Lords of Lípa. The next notable owners were the Špánovskýs of Lisov, who ruled it from 1579 to 1629. During this period, Mladá Vožice gained various privileges and flourished.

In 1678, the estate changed owners for the Küenburg family, who adjoined other smaller possessions in the area and established it a hereditary estate. The Küenburg family owned Mladá Vožice until the abolition of serfdom.

=== 20th century ===
The town and neighbourhood of Mladá Vožice was a purely agricultural area until 1945, and the change towards industrialisation only began after the liberation. Until 1947 Mladá Vožice had been a court district in the political Tábor District.

Since 1949, after the change in the political and state system, Mladá Vožice was included in the newly established district of Votice in Prague Region. After the land reorganisation of 1960, Mladá Vožice fell under the Tábor District in the South Bohemian Region. In 1975–1980, several small villages and hamlets were merged with the town of Mladá Vožice into one municipality but in 1990, Běleč, Hlasivo, Řemíčov and Vilice became again independent municipalities.

== Demographics ==
Historical population

Year	Pop.	±%
1869	4,144	—
1880	4,163	+0.5%
1890	3,909	−6.1%
1900	3,539	−9.5%
1910	3,507	−0.9%

Year	Pop.	±%
1921	3,327	−5.1%
1930	3,029	−9.0%
1950	2,605	−14.0%
1961	2,656	+2.0%
1970	2,573	−3.1%

Year	Pop.	±%
1980	2,735	+6.3%
1991	2,777	+1.5%
2001	2,735	−1.5%
2011	2,656	−2.9%
2021	2,631	−0.9%

Source: Censuses

== Transport ==
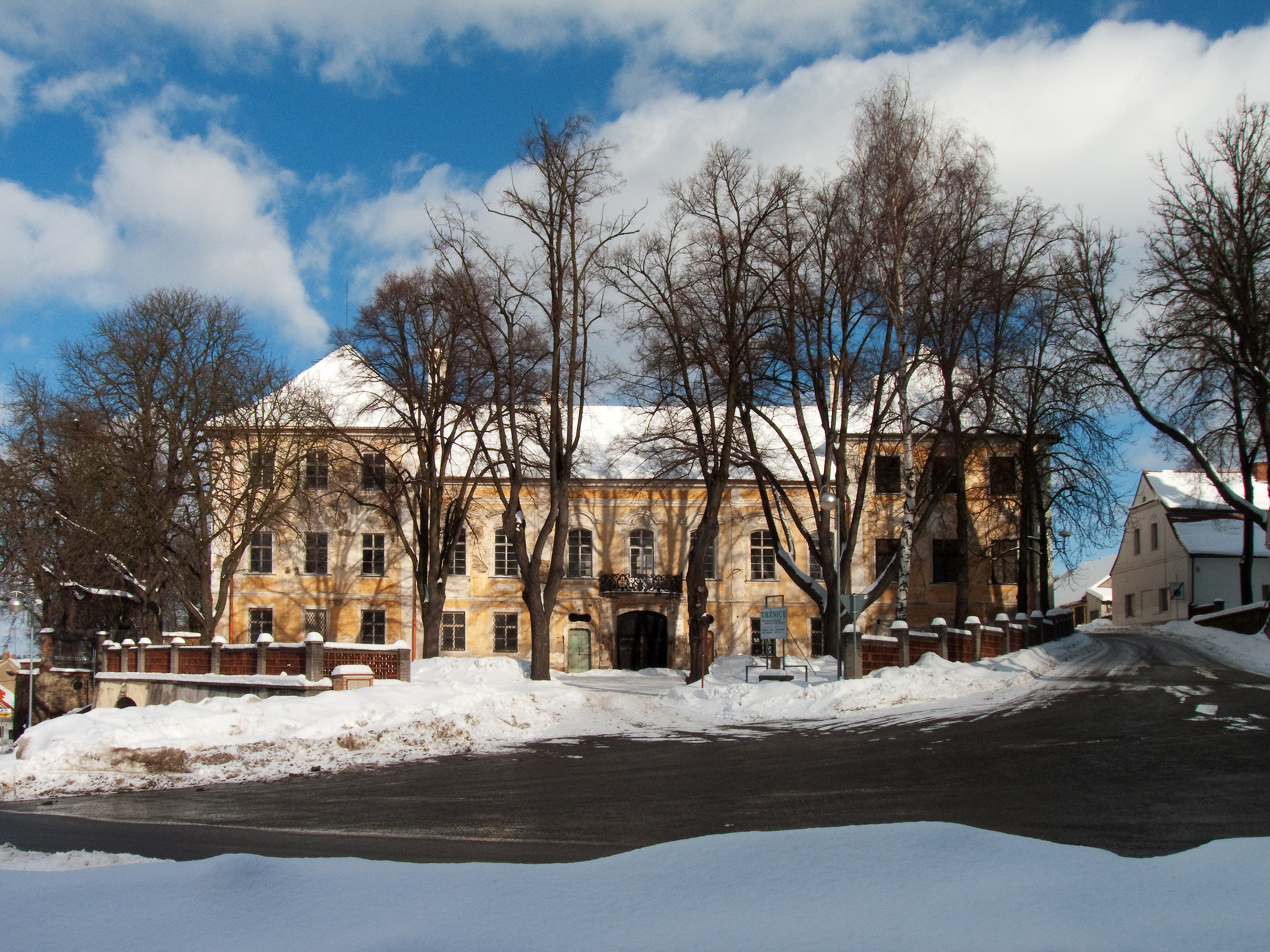
Mladá Vožice Castle

There are no railways or major roads passing through the town.

== Sights ==
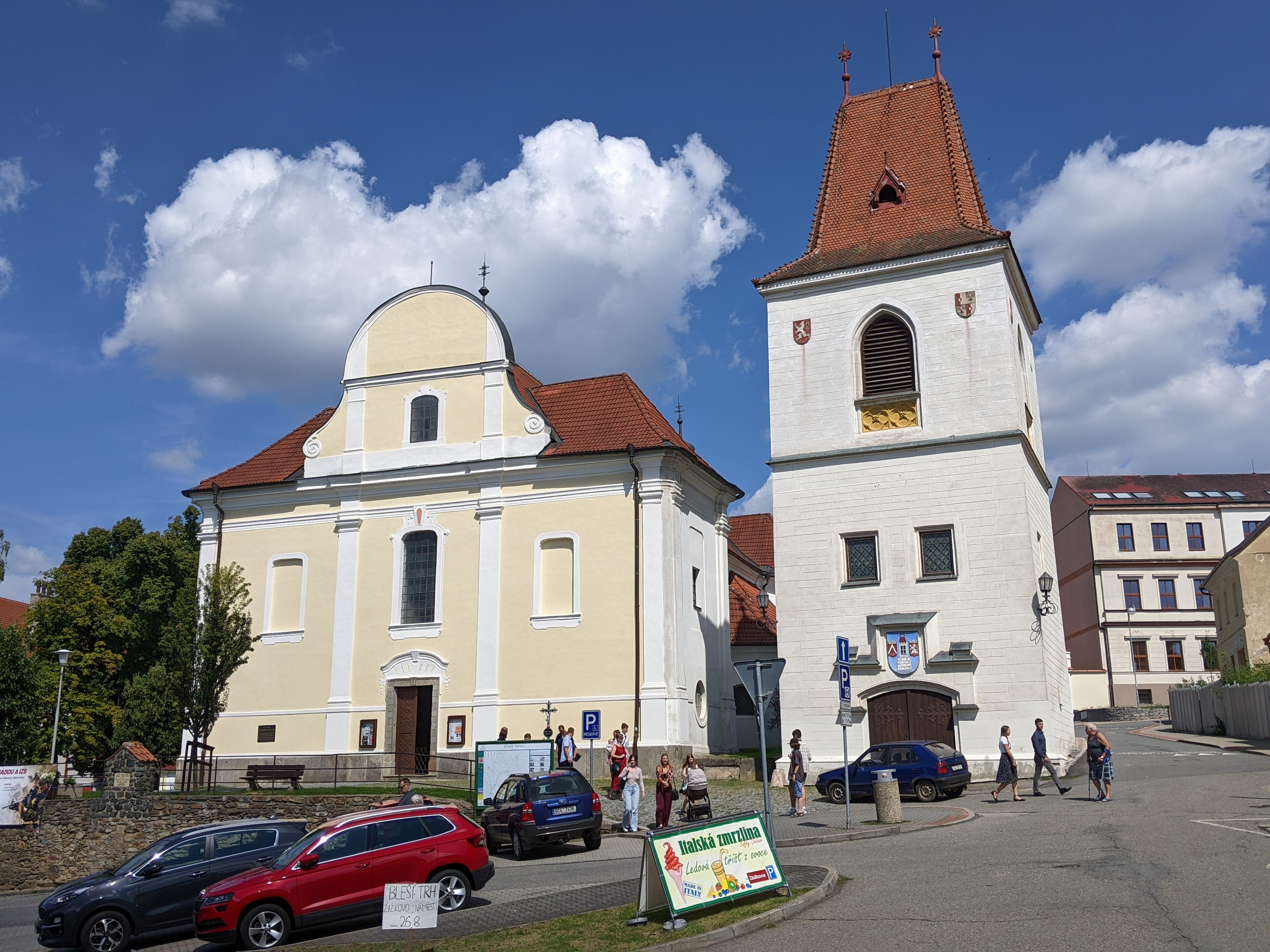
Church of Saint Martin and the bell tower

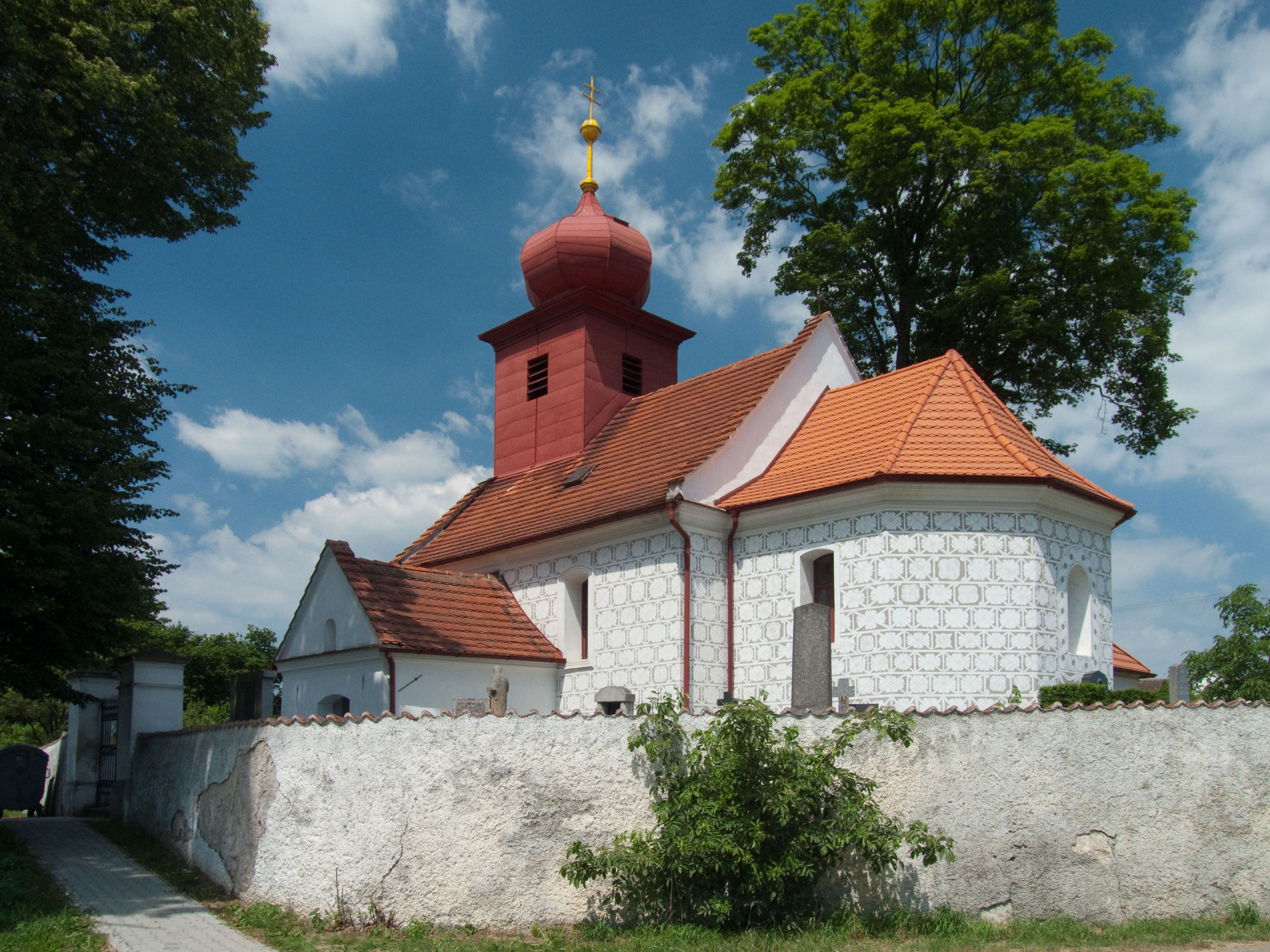
Church of the Virgin Mary and Saint Wenceslaus

Among the main landmarks of the town is the Church of Saint Martin. Existence of the church was first documented in 1348. After it dilapidated, a new Baroque church was built in 1794. It is situated on a reinforced terrace above the Žižkovo Square. Next to the church is a separate bell tower, built in 1425 and rebuilt in the pseudo-Gothic style at the beginning of the 20th century. All the church bells were seized in 1942 except for the passing bell; the bell called Jan was returned and blessed as late as 1952 and three new bells, Maria, Václav and Martin sounding Gloria in concord, were bought thanks to fund-raising in 1986.

The Mladá Vožice Castle was built in the same square in 1570–1603. It was rebuilt to its present Baroque form by the Küenburg family, who owned it from 1678 to 1945. In 1946, the castle was confiscated and its interiors were used by the Koh-i-Noor factory. In 2001, it was bought by two private companies.

The Church of the Assumption of the Virgin Mary is situated on top of a hill above the town, on the site of the former castle. Built in the early Baroque style in 1646, it was extended in 1827. It was built by Krištof Karel Přehořovský of Kvasejovice, the owner of the Vožice estate. Late Neoclassical Stations of the Cross leads to the church.

The Church of Saint Nicholas is located on the northwestern outskirts of the town. It is an early Baroque cemetery church from the mid-17th century, which replaced a dilapidated church from the 14th century.

The Church of the Virgin Mary and Saint Wenceslaus is located in Blanice. It was originally a Gothic church, most likely from the first half of the 14th century. It was then rebuilt in the Renaissance and Baroque styles. The sgraffito decoration dates from the 15th century.

The Church of All Saints is located in Janov. It was built in the Baroque style in 1725 or 1726. It probably has medieval core.

== Notable people ==
- Matthias of Janov (1350/55–1393/94), ecclesiastical writer
- August Sedláček (1843–1926), historian and archivist
- Ota Bubeníček (1871–1962), landscape painter; lived here from 1932
- Fran Lhotka (1883–1962), Czech-Croatian composer and musician
