= Bible translations into Czech =

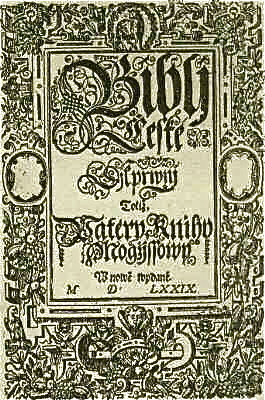
Bible of Kralice, title page, vol.1

The Czech literature of the Middle Ages is very rich in translations of Biblical books, made from the Vulgate. During the 14th century all parts of the Bible seem to have been translated at different times and by different hands. The oldest translations are those of the Psalter. The New Testament must also have existed at that time, for according to a statement of Wyclif, Anne, daughter of Charles IV, received in 1381 upon her marrying Richard II of England a Bohemian New Testament.

It is certain that Jan Hus had the Bible in Bohemian before him as a whole and he and his successors undertook a revision of the text according to the Vulgate. The work of Hus on the Bible antedated 1412. During the 15th century the revision was continued. The first complete Bible was published at Prague in 1488 (the Prague Bible); other editions were issued at Kutná Hora in 1489, and Venice in 1506. These prints were the basis of other editions which were published from time to time.

With the United Brethren a new period began for the translation of the Bible. In 1518 the New Testament appeared at Mladá Boleslav at the instance of Luke of Prague. It was not satisfactory and the same must be said of the edition of 1533. Altogether different was the New Testament translation made by Jan Blahoslav from the original Greek (1564, 1568). The Brethren anon undertook the translation of the Old Testament from the original and appointed for this work a number of scholars, who based their translation upon the Hebrew text published in the Antwerp Polyglot. The work began in 1577 and was completed in 1593, and from the place of printing, Kralice in Moravia, it is known as the Bible of Kralice (6 parts, 1579–93, containing also Blahoslav's New Testament). This excellent translation was issued in smaller size in 1596, and again in folio in 1613 (reprinted at Halle in 1722, 1745, 1766; Pressburg, 1787; Berlin, 1807).

After the year 1620 the publication of non-Catholic Bibles in Bohemia and Moravia ceased, and efforts were made to prepare Bibles for the Catholics. After some fruitless beginnings the work was entrusted to certain Jesuits, who took the Venice edition of 1506 as the basis, but relied greatly, especially for the Old Testament, on the Brethren's Bible. Between 1677 and 1715 the so-called St. Wenceslaus Bible was published at the expense of a society founded in honor of the saint. A new edition appeared at Prague 1769–71. A thoroughly revised edition, using the text of the Brethren's Bible, was published in 1778–80. Still more dependent on the Brethren's Bible was Prochaska's New Testament (Prague, 1786), and his edition of the whole Bible (1804). Editions of Prochaska's text, slightly amended, were issued in 1851 and 1857. The Bible edited by Besdka (Prague, 1860) gives the text of the Brethren's Bible with slight changes. G. Palkovi translated the Bible from the Vulgate into Slovak (2 parts, Gran, 1829).

The first translation of the whole Bible into Czech, based on the Latin Vulgate, was done in 1360. The Bible is called the "Bible of Dresden". This manuscript was lost during World War I. Many other translations followed this Bible of Dresden, and from the linguistic point of view they can be divided in four different redactions. The last one was finally printed. One of the lesser known Czech bibles is the Bible Padeřova, whose only extant manuscript (kept today at the Austrian National Library under the signature Biblia Bohemica, saec. XV) was probably copied in the period 1431-1435 by order of the Taborite hetman Filip of Padeřov (Czech Filip z Padeřova). Historian Viktor Kubík has analyzed the illumination of the Bible Padeřova in a recent work of his.

The first printed Czech New Testament is the "New Testament of Dlabač", printed in 1487. The first printed complete Bible is the "Bible of Prague" from 1488. Another Czech Bible printed before the year 1501 is the "Bible of Kutná Hora", printed in 1489. All these texts were translated from the Vulgate.

The first translation from the original languages into Czech was the Bible of Kralice, first published in years 1579–1593. The translation was done by the Unity of the Brethren. The third edition from 1613 is considered classical and is one of the most used Czech Bible translations.

== Comparison ==
Translation	Genesis 1:1–3	John (Jan) 3:16
Bible of Kralice (1613; Bible kralická)	Na počátku stvořil Bůh nebe a zemi. Země pak byla nesličná a pustá, a tma byla nad propastí, a Duch Boží vznášel se nad vodami. I řekl Bůh: Buď světlo! I bylo světlo.	Nebo tak Bůh miloval svět, že Syna svého jednorozeného dal, aby každý, kdož věří v něho, nezahynul, ale měl život věčný.
Bible svatováclavská (1677, 1715)	Na počátku stvořil Bůh nebe a zemi. Země pak byla nenesoucí užitku a prázdná, a tmy byly nad tváří propasti; a Duch Boží vznášel se nad vodami. I řekl Bůh: Buď světlo. A učiněno jest světlo.	Nebo tak Bůh miloval svět, že Syna svého jednorozeného dal, aby každý, kdož věří v něho, nezahynul, ale měl život věčný.
Český ekumenický překlad (1979)	Na počátku stvořil Bůh nebe a zemi. Země byla pustá a prázdná a nad propastnou tůní byla tma. Ale nad vodami vznášel se duch Boží. I řekl Bůh: 'Buď světlo!' A bylo světlo.	Neboť Bůh tak miloval svět, že dal svého jediného Syna, aby žádný, kdo v něho věří, nezahynul, ale měl život věčný.
Bible, překlad 21. století (2009; "Bible21")	Na počátku Bůh stvořil nebe a zemi. Země pak byla pustá a prázdná, nad propastí byla tma a nad vodami se vznášel Boží Duch. Bůh řekl: „Ať je světlo!“ – a bylo světlo.	Neboť Bůh tak miloval svět, že dal svého jednorozeného Syna, aby žádný, kdo v něj věří, nezahynul, ale měl věčný život.
New World Translation of the Holy Scriptures (ed. 2019; Překlad nového světa)	Na počátku Bůh stvořil nebe a zemi. Země byla beztvará a pustá, nad povrchem vodní hlubiny byla tma a nad vodami se pohybovala Boží aktivní síla. A Bůh řekl: „Ať je světlo. A bylo světlo.	Vždyť Bůh tak miloval svět, že dal svého jediného Syna, aby nikdo, kdo v něj věří, nezahynul, ale měl věčný život.
