= Fran Lhotka =

Czech-born Croatian composer

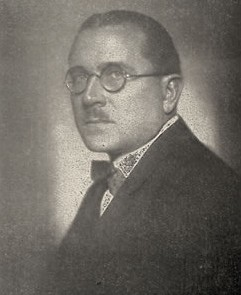
- Born: 25 December 1883; Mladá Vožice, Bohemia, Austria-Hungary
- Died: 26 January 1962; Zagreb, Croatia, Yugoslavia
- Occupations: Composer and teacher of music

Fran Lhotka (25 December 1883 – 26 January 1962) was a Czech-born Croatian composer and teacher of classical music.

He studied under Antonín Dvořák, Leoš Janáček, and Josef Klička in Prague. In 1909, he moved to Zagreb where as an instructor at the Conservatory he taught various contemporary Croatian composers. He composed in many genres, including orchestral music, ballet, chamber music, and opera.

== Biography ==
Fran Lhotka was born on 25 December 1883 in the town of Mladá Vožice in Bohemia. In 1899 he became a student at the Prague Conservatory, studying horn and composition, which he was taught by Karel Stecker, Josef Klička and Antonín Dvořák. Six years later he graduated in both courses. He worked for a short time as a teacher in a branch of the Moscow Conservatory in Yekaterinoslav (present-day Dnipropetrovsk, Ukraine), before moving to Zagreb in 1909, where he was employed as the first hornist and rehearsal pianist in the Opera. From 1910, Lhotka was also a teacher in the Academy of Music, where he taught various subjects, including harmony, horn, conducting, theory, and composition.

Between 1912 and 1920, he led the 'Lisinski' Chorus, with which he toured Central Europe. He also conducted the orchestra of the Music Academy (1922 – 1941). For some time he ran the Community Orchestra of the Croatian Music Institute (1923 – 1930) and occasionally conducted the Zagreb Philharmonic Orchestra. He also had administrative duties at the Academy, twice being rector there. In addition to his teaching work, Lhotka wrote textbooks on conducting (1931) and harmony (1948).

On 26 January 1962, Lhotka died in Zagreb, Croatia. He had three sons, Ivo Lhotka-Kalinski (1913–1987), also a composer; Nenad Lhotka, a ballet dancer/ballet master of the Royal Winnipeg Ballet; and Sasha Lhotka.

== Composition ==
Beside his pedagogical and academic work, Lhotka was also known for composition. He arrived in Zagreb when European Classical music was transitioning from the Romantic style to the modernist style of the 20th century, typified by the works of Arnold Schoenberg, Igor Stravinsky, Béla Bartók and Alexander Scriabin. At that time, writing in the spirit of folk music marked a composer's place in a national culture, and Lhotka found himself inspired by the Czech folk music of his home, incorporating it into his compositional style. As well as choral works and arrangements of folk songs, he was most attracted by orchestral and stage music. His works for orchestra, his two operas (Minka and More / The Sea), his film music (documentaries and features, among which the last was Svoga tela gospodar / Master of his Own Body), and a number of ballet works were the mainstay of his creative work. He achieved particular successes with ballets created in association with Pia and Pino Mlakar, both dancers and choreographers. With them he produced Đavo u selu, balada o jednoj srednjovjekovnoj ljubavi / Devil in the Village, Ballad of a Middle Aged Love and The Bow, on of his most successful pieces which was widely performed across Europe.

== Works (selection) ==
A selection of his works include:

- Violin Concerto
- Piano Concerto
- Symphony
- String quartet in G minor (1911)
- The Devil in the Village (ballet in 8 scenes) (by 1935)
- Film People Will Survive (1947)(Zivjece ovaj narod)
- Concerto for Strings (by 1957)
- Frescoes, Three Symphonic Movements (1957)
- Film The Master of his Own Body (1957)(Svoga tela gospodar)
- Sljepačka for viola and piano (1960)
- Serenade for two flutes, clarinet and piano
