= Anna Pammrová =

Czech writer, feminist and philosopher (1860-1945)

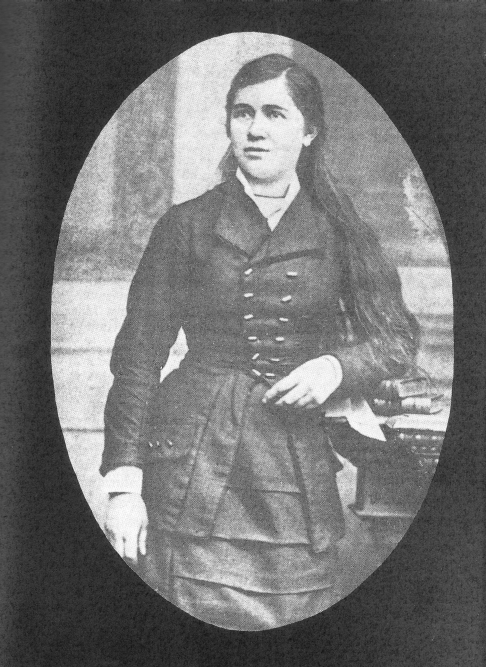
Anna Pammrová

Anna Pammrová (29 June 1860, Kralice nad Oslavou – 19 September 1945, Žďárec) was a Czech writer, feminist and philosopher. She had a difficult personal life with an unhappy childhood and marriage. After her divorce, she lived in poverty in a forest with her two children. Her daughter died and her son escaped and did not return. She survived with the help of her friends. Throughout her life she corresponded with her friend Otokar Březina who she met in Jinošov in 1887 and their letters resurfaced in 2008. Her autobiographical fragmentary novel 'Antieva' was published posthumously in 1997.

== Bibliography ==
- Alfa. Embryonální pokus o řešení ženské otázky, 1917
- O mateřství a pamateřství, 1919
- Cestou k zářnému cíli, 1925
- Zápisky nečitelné, 1936
- Odezva z lůna stvoření, 1937
- Mé vzpomínky na Otokara Březinu, 1940
- Zrcadlo duše, ed. J. Vitula, 1945
- Žena s duší lesa (výběr z dopisů A. P. Leonoře Pammrové-Pohorské), ed. L. Kuchař. 1970
- Dopisy A. P. rodině Havlových, před. I. M. Havel, SI 1982
- Antieva, Společnost Anny Pammrové, 1997
