= Žďárec =

- Municipality
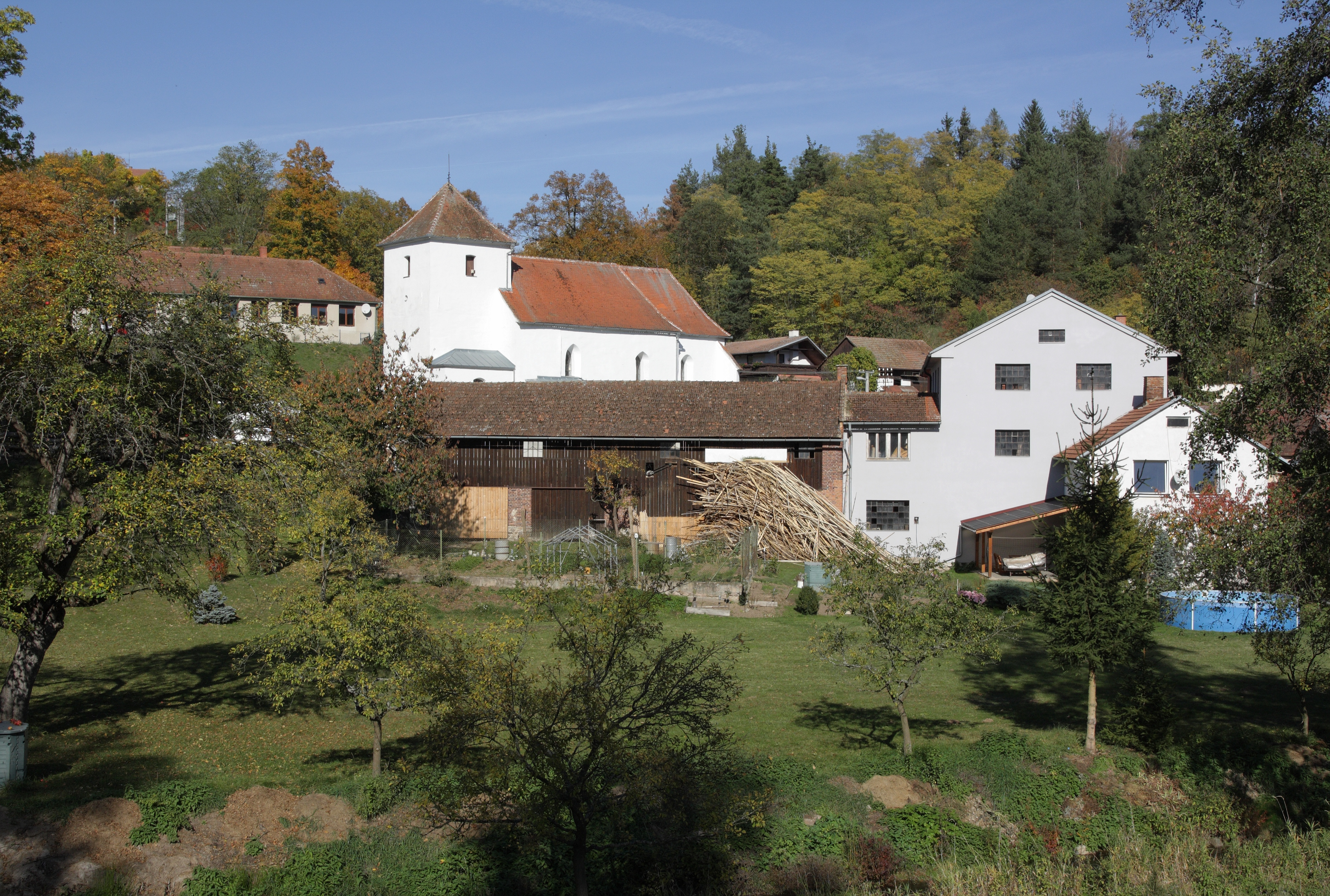
- View from the south

- Location in the Czech Republic
- Coordinates: 49°22′47″N 16°15′59″E
- Country: Czech Republic
- Region: South Moravian
- District: Brno-Country
- First mentioned: 1358

Area
  - Total: 8.02 km^{2} (3.10 sq mi)
- Elevation: 462 m (1,516 ft)

Population (2026-01-01)
  - Total: 384
  - Density: 47.9/km^{2} (124/sq mi)
- Time zone: UTC+1 (CET)
  - Summer (DST): UTC+2 (CEST)
- Postal codes: 594 51, 594 56
- Website: obec-zdarec.cz

Žďárec is a municipality and village in Brno-Country District in the South Moravian Region of the Czech Republic. It has about 400 inhabitants.

Žďárec lies approximately 33 kilometres (21 mi) north-west of Brno and 155 kilometres (96 mi) south-east of Prague.

== Administrative division ==
Žďárec consists of three municipal parts (in brackets population according to the 2021 census):

- Žďárec (311)
- Ostrov (27)
- Víckov (9)

== Demographics ==
Historical population
Year	Pop.	±%
1869	475	—
1880	552	+16.2%
1890	505	−8.5%
1900	564	+11.7%
1910	609	+8.0%
1921	600	−1.5%
1930	574	−4.3%
1950	460	−19.9%
1961	412	−10.4%
1970	387	−6.1%
1980	381	−1.6%
1991	344	−9.7%
2001	354	+2.9%
2011	378	+6.8%
2021	347	−8.2%
Source: Censuses

== Notable people ==
- Anna Pammrová (1860–1945), writer, feminist and philosopher; died here
