= Rašovice =

Rašovice may refer to places in the Czech Republic:

- Rašovice (Kutná Hora District), a municipality and village in the Central Bohemian Region
- Rašovice (Vyškov District), a municipality and village in the South Moravian Region
- Rašovice, a village and part of Hlasivo in the South Bohemian Region
- Rašovice, a village and part of Klášterec nad Ohří in the Ústí nad Labem Region
- Rašovice, a village and part of Úštěk in the Ústí nad Labem Region
- Rašovice, a village and part of Týniště nad Orlicí in the Hradec Králové Region
