= Chotiněves =

- Municipality
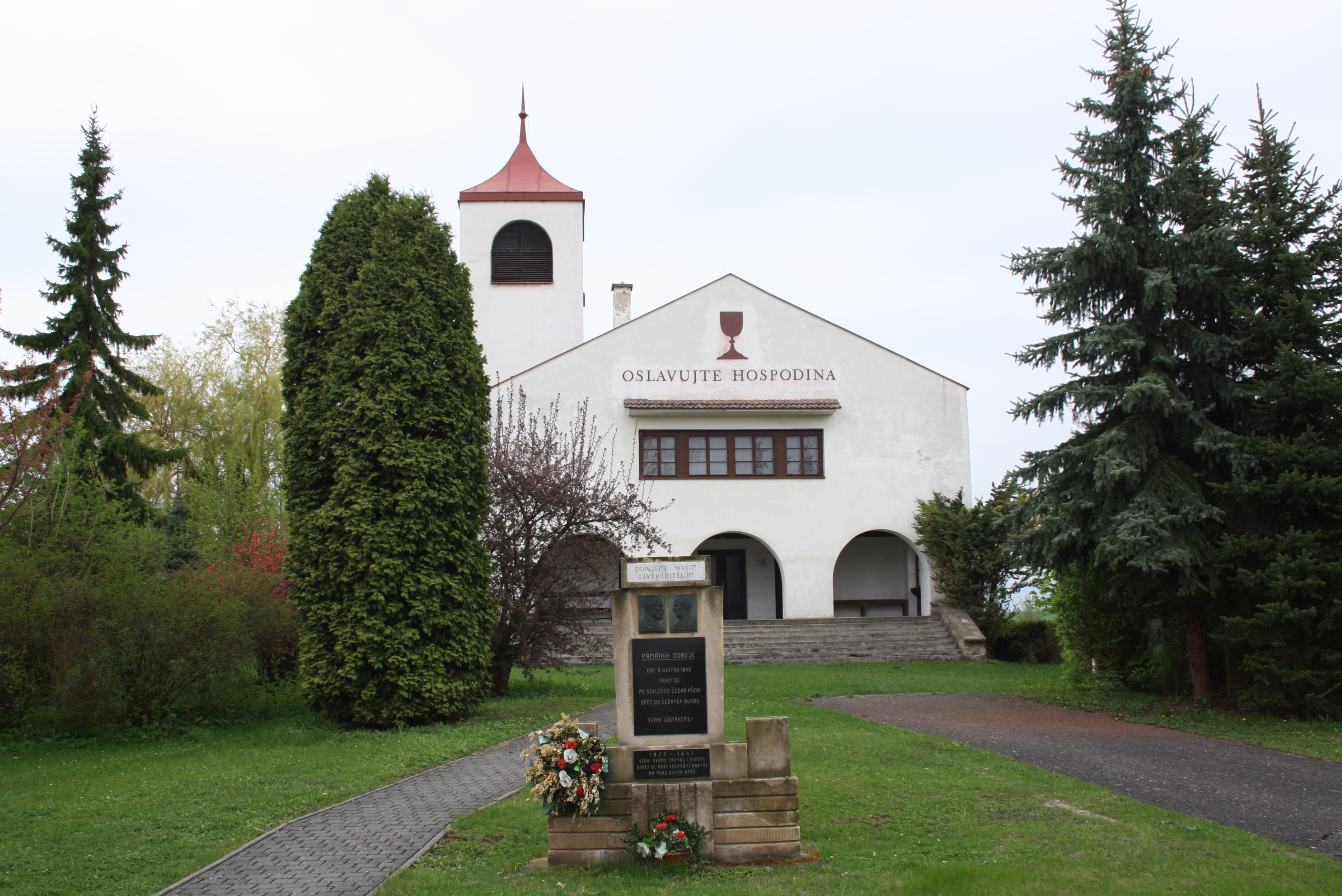
- Protestant church of the Czech Brethren

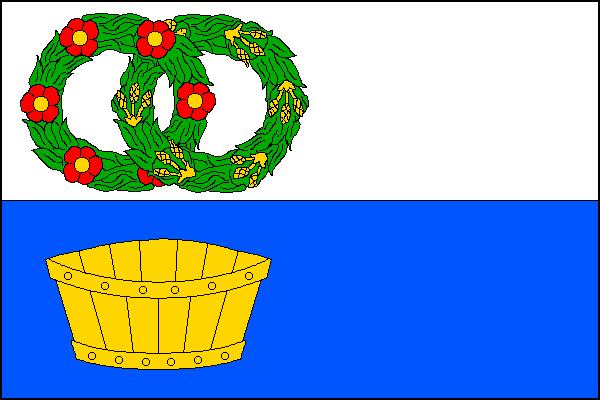
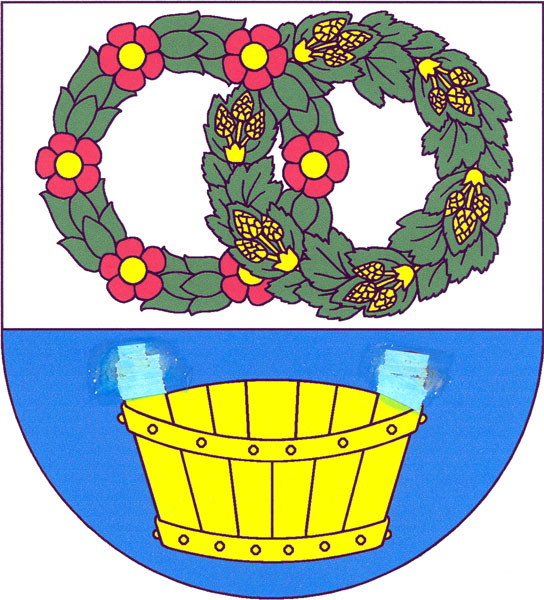
- Flag Coat of arms

- Location in the Czech Republic
- Coordinates: 50°33′8″N 14°16′46″E
- Country: Czech Republic
- Region: Ústí nad Labem
- District: Litoměřice
- First mentioned: 1323

Area
  - Total: 7.04 km^{2} (2.72 sq mi)
- Elevation: 275 m (902 ft)

Population (2026-01-01)
  - Total: 200
  - Density: 28/km^{2} (74/sq mi)
- Time zone: UTC+1 (CET)
  - Summer (DST): UTC+2 (CEST)
- Postal code: 411 45
- Website: www.chotineves.cz

Chotiněves (German: Kuttendorf) is a municipality and village in Litoměřice District in the Ústí nad Labem Region of the Czech Republic. It has about 200 inhabitants.

Chotiněves lies approximately 12 kilometres (7 mi) east of Litoměřice, 21 km (13 mi) south-east of Ústí nad Labem, and 53 km (33 mi) north of Prague.

== Administrative division ==
Chotiněves consists of two municipal parts (in brackets population according to the 2021 census):

- Chotiněves (155)
- Jištěrpy (53)

== Demographics ==
Historical population
Year	Pop.	±%
1869	644	—
1880	635	−1.4%
1890	648	+2.0%
1900	691	+6.6%
1910	646	−6.5%
1921	597	−7.6%
1930	582	−2.5%
1950	386	−33.7%
1961	361	−6.5%
1970	294	−18.6%
1980	235	−20.1%
1991	185	−21.3%
2001	176	−4.9%
2011	201	+14.2%
2021	208	+3.5%
Source: Censuses
