= Ota Bubeníček =

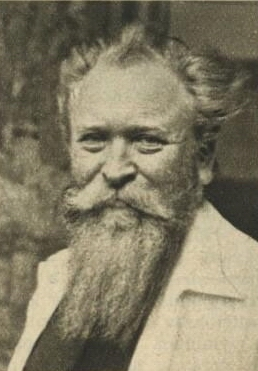
Ota Bubeníček in 1941

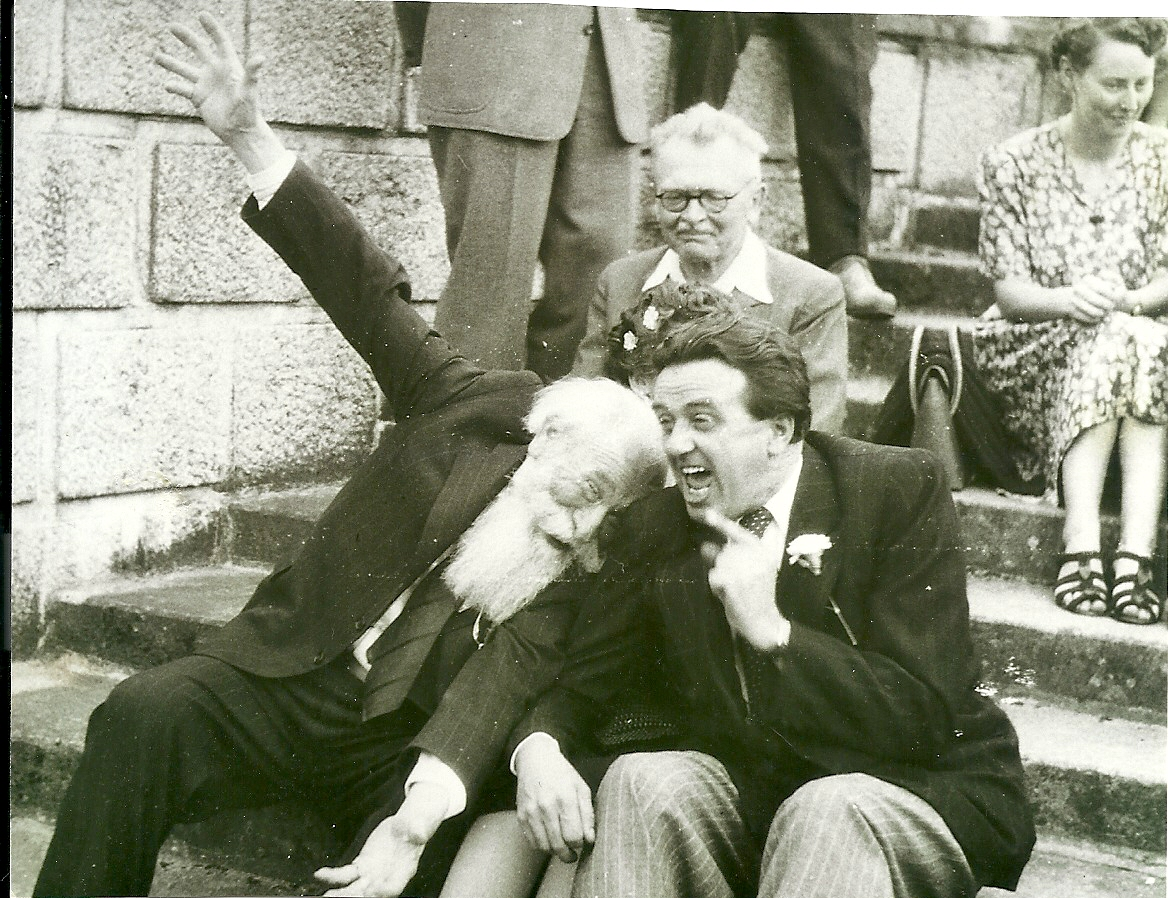
Ota Bubeníček (left) and Jan Vavřík-Rýz

Ota Bubeníček (31 October 1871 in Uhříněves – 10 September 1962 in Mladá Vožice) was a Czech landscape painter. He was also widely regarded as Bohemia's greatest marionnetter.
