= August Sedláček =

Czech historian and archivist

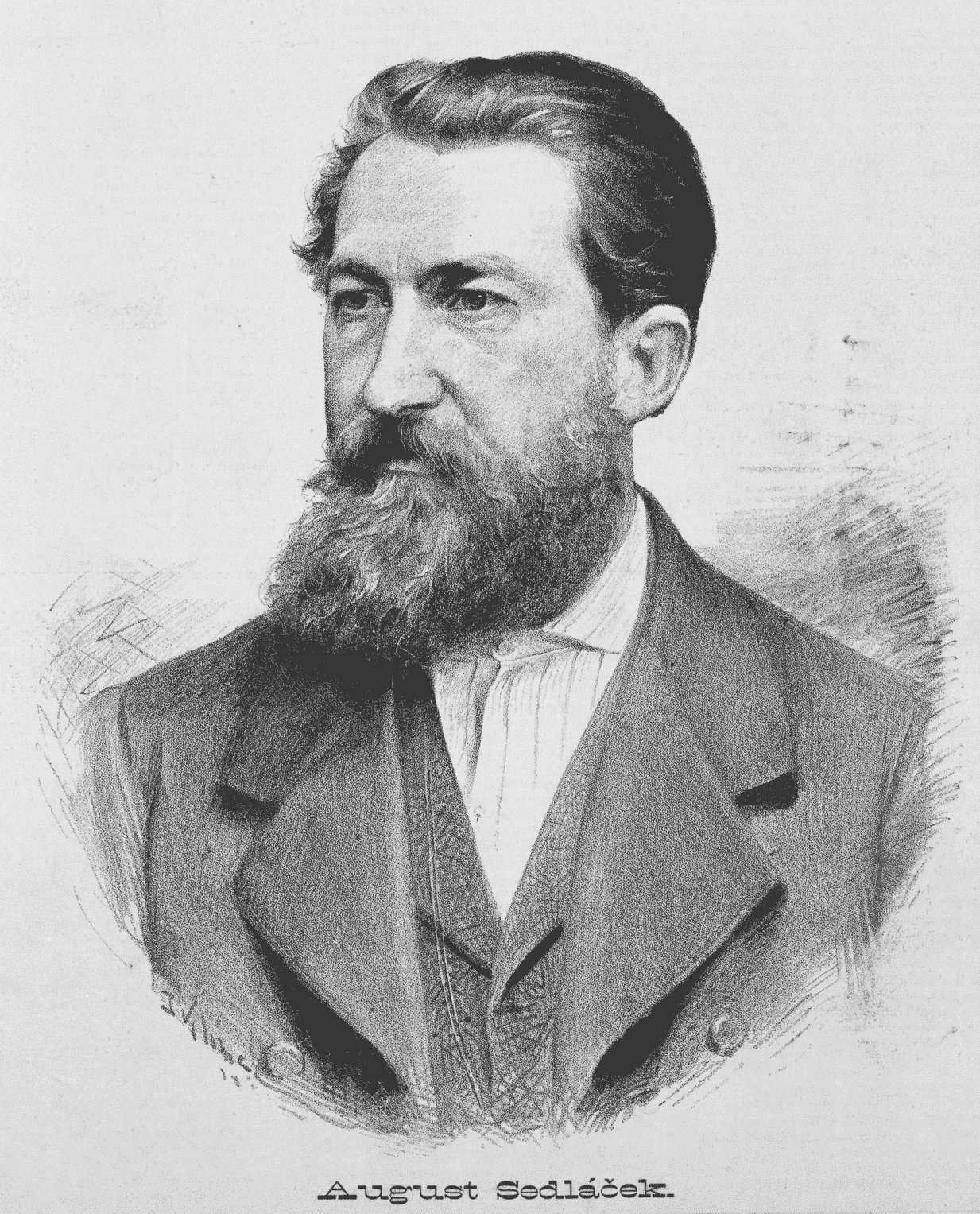
August Sedláček (1882)

August Sedláček (28 August 1843 – 15 January 1926) was a Czech historian and archivist.

Sedláček was born in Mladá Vožice, Bohemia. Notably, he worked in medieval history, detailing the history of Medieval castles in the Bohemian Kingdom. He wrote among others extensively on autonomous region of Prachens in the southwest of Bohemia in 1926 (Děje Prachenského Kraje, Písek).

== Bibliography ==
- Hrady, zámky a tvrze království českého, 15 vols., 1882–1927.
