= Luke of Prague =

Czech Unitas Fratrum bishop (1450s-1528)

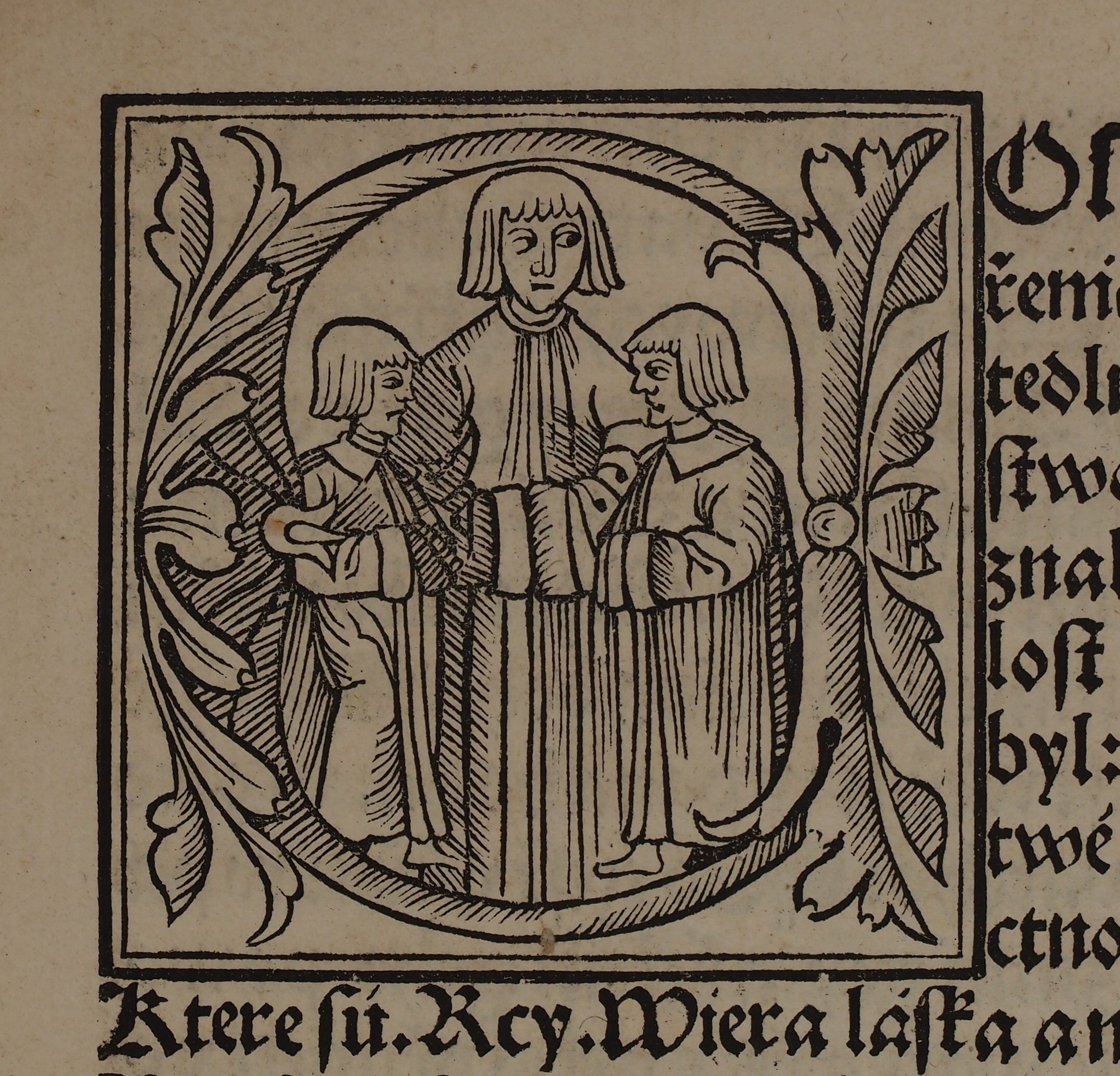

Luke (Lukáš) of Prague (Czech: Lukáš Pražský, d. December 11, 1528) was a bishop of the Unitas Fratrum, one of the most significant theologians of the Bohemian Reformation.

Luke of Prague was born in Prague in the late 1450s and grew up in Prague. He attended University of Prague where he studied the standard church fathers and medieval teachers but was also exposed to the writings of Petr Chelčický. He graduated from the University of Prague on October 2, 1481.

Luke encountered the Unitas Fratrum around the time he graduated from university and after reading some their writings and meeting with members in Litomyšl, decided to accept their basic principles and become a member. Around the time that Luke joined the Unitas Fratrum, the “seclusionary and narrow views” of the early members of the Unity were being challenged by views that “were not so completely terrified of any involvement in the outside world.” During this difficult time, Luke and three other members were sent to find a Christian community “fully keeping and living the “apostolic faith.” Luke travelled to through the Balkans and covered the Turkish lands in Europe and Asia but did not find any such communities.

Luke wrote Bárka [The Ship] in 1493 as an allegorical tale where the Unity was depicted as a boat that was weathering a storm. The Ship sought to address the issues that were dividing the Unity but also illustrates Luke's theology that “involves a full dependence on Christ.”

The Unitas Fratrum went into an open schism in 1495 with the church divided into the Minor Party representing the views of the early members of the Unity and the Major Party backing the ideas of Luke and other newer members. The viewpoint of Luke and those that felt similarly ultimately prevailed at a Synod in Rychnov in 1494. Luke was elected to the Inner Council of the Church at that Synod.

Luke was the head of the Unity when the Protestant Reformation began and corresponded with Martin Luther.

Luke died on December 11, 1528, in Mladá Boleslav.
