= Prague Bible =

1488 printing of the Bible, first complete version in Czech

The Prague Bible printed in 1488 was the first complete version of the Bible printed in Czech and in a Slavic language at the same time. The Bible was printed in Prague, the capital of the Kingdom of Bohemia, present-day Czech Republic. The text of the Bible represents the fourth version of the Czech Bible translation from Latin (the first version was made before 1360). The Bible consists of more than 610 pages. It was published at the expense of four rich Prague citizens. Today there are around 90 preserved copies of the Prague Bible.

One year later, in 1489, another Czech Bible was published in Kutná Hora, which is the oldest Czech printed Bible with illustrations.
