= Matthias of Janov =

Czech priest (c. 1350–1393/1394)

Matthias of Janov (Czech: Matěj z Janova; Latin: Matthias de Janow; c. 1350 – 1393/1394 in Prague) was a fourteenth-century Bohemian ecclesiastical writer and one of the most significant authors of the nascent Bohemian Reformation.

He was the son of Václav of Janow, a Bohemian knight, and began his studies at the University of Prague, before leaving to complete them in Paris. He graduated nine years later. For this he is known as Magister Parisiensis ("Parisian Master").

In 1381, he was appointed canon and confessor in the Prague cathedral, offices he would hold until his death. Between 1388 and 1392, he wrote several essays, which were later collected and entitled Regulae Veteris et Novi Testamenti ("Principles of the Old and the New Testaments"). This work has never been published in its entirety, nor can it befound complete in any one manuscript. Some parts were falsely thought to be the work of Jan Hus and published with his writings.

Janow disapproved of the contemporary Papal Schism and of the large number of papal exemptions and reservations, and criticized other Christians for placing excessive weight on accidental external practices. He advocated the removal of saints and their relics from the churches, because of the abuses he witnessed involving their veneration. He also took the view that it was all but necessary for the laity to receive Communion every day. At the Synod of Prague in 1389 such encouragement of daily Communion was prohibited, and the veneration of images defended. Janow retracted his views and swore repeatedly that he had unfailing loyalty towards the Catholic Church; therefore, he was not punished. Still, because of his previous claims, there are some who considered him to be a forerunner of Jan Hus.

== Literature ==
- Forst, Vladimír; Jeřábek, Dušan (1993). Lexikon české literatury: osobnosti, díla, instituce. Ústav pro českou a světovou literaturu. Praha: Academia. pp. 459–461. ISBN 978-80-200-0345-4.
- Augusta, Pavel, ed. (1999). Kdo byl kdo: v našich dějinách do roku 1918 (4. vyd ed.). Praha: Naklad. Libri. p. 259. ISBN 978-80-85983-94-4.
