= Jan Blahoslav =

Czech linguist and writer (1523–1571)

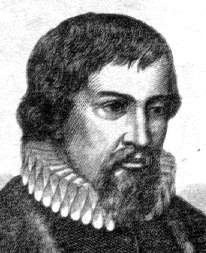
Jan Blahoslav

Jan Blahoslav (20 February 1523 – 24 November 1571) was a Czech humanistic writer, poet, translator, etymologist, hymnographer, grammarian, music theorist and composer. He was a Unity of the Brethren bishop, and translated the New Testament into Czech in 1564. This was incorporated into the Bible of Kralice.

== Life ==
Blahoslav was born in Přerov, Moravia. He studied theory under Listenius and Hermann Finck at University of Wittenberg from 1544. At Wittenberg he became acquainted with Martin Luther, and he was also acquainted with Philipp Melanchthon. After a short period at Mladá Boleslav (1548–9) he continued his education at Königsberg and Basle. He was a linguist who strove to preserve the purity of his native tongue and succeeded in bridging the gulf between Christianity and humanism. He was ordained at Mladá Boleslav in 1553, and became a bishop of the Fraternity of Czech (or Moravian) Brethren in 1557 during the imprisonment of Jan Augusta. In the following year he established himself at Ivančice, where before long he installed a printing press. Towards the end of his life he moved to Moravský Krumlov, where he died, aged 48.

Blahoslav was the editor of the 1561 Czech-language hymnal of the Unity, a hymnal which was reprinted and revised at least 10 times over the next 50 years. His Muzika (1558) -- a "theoretical instruction book for the singing of hymns"—has been called "the first book in Czech presenting the theory of music and singing." He also worked for many years on a translation of the New Testament and is responsible for the creation of the Moravian Archives. some of his work is held by the Moravian Music Foundation in North Carolina

Blahoslav's work influenced Jan Amos Komenský.

== Works ==
- O původu Jednoty – Rules of Unity
- Filipika proti misomusům
- Gramatika česká – Czech Grammar
- Bratrský archiv
- Naučení mládencům
- Akta Jednoty bratrské – Rules of the Unity of the Brethren
- Rejstřík skladatelů bratrských písní

== Works on music ==
- Muzika (Olomouc, 1558) – On Music
- Šamotulský kancionál (1561) – Cantionale
- Věčný králi, pane náš – Song published in Staročeské hymny a písně (Old Czech Hymns and Songs) (1940)

== Bibliography ==
- Brown, Marshall T., Jan Blahoslav: Sixteenth-Century Moravian Reformer, Edinburgh, The Banner of Truth Magazine, Issue 544, January 2009, pp. 1–9.
- Brown, M. T. (2013). John Blahoslav – Sixteenth-Century Moravian Reformer : Transforming the Czech Nation by the Word of God. Bonn: Verlag für Kultur und Wissenschaft. ISBN 9783862690633.

== See also ==
- List of Czech writers
- Slavic translations of the Bible
