= Jan Augusta =

Czech bishop (1500–1572)

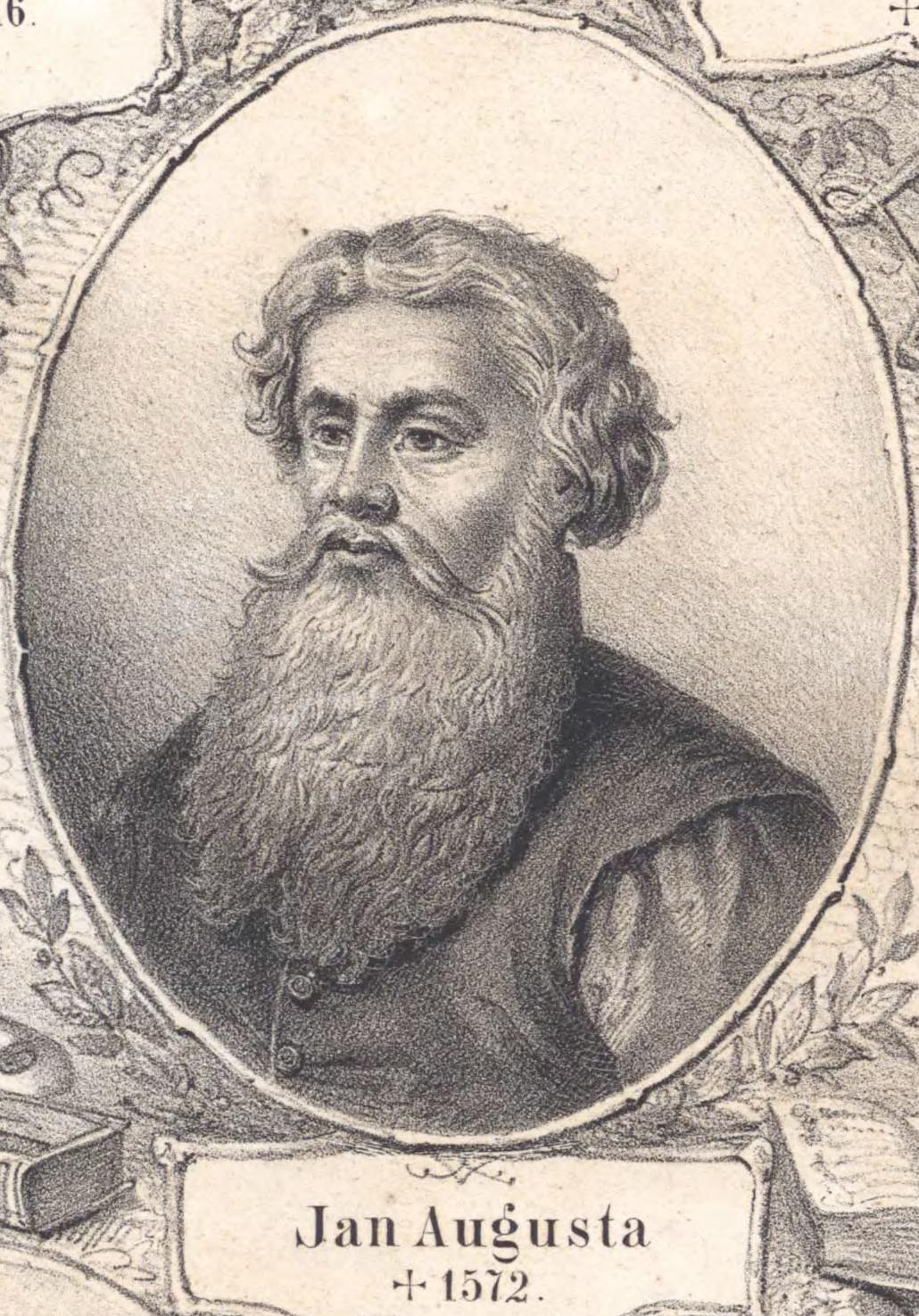
Jan Augusta

Jan Augusta (1500, Prague – 13 January 1572, Mladá Boleslav) was a Czech bishop of the Unitas Fratrum and a Protestant Reformer.

== Life ==
Augusta was born in Prague in 1500 and learned his father's trade of hat making. He was not formally educated but had read the works of Czech priests like Matthias of Janov and Jan Hus. Augusta joined the Unitas Fratrum in 1524 after exploring and rejecting other Christian communities. He was elected a bishop of the Unitas Fratrum in 1532 and in 1535 journeyed to Wittenberg, Germany on behalf of the Unity to consult with Martin Luther. Augusta was named the president of the Inner Council of the Unitas Fratrum in 1547.

He prepared Czech and Latin versions of a confession of the faith for the Unity and wrote many hymns that were included in several Czech hymnals.

He discouraged members of the Unitas Fratrum from cooperating with Ferdinand I during the Smalkaldic War. After the war was over, Ferdinand banished the whole sect and arrested the principal preachers. Augusta attempted to escape in the garb of a peasant, but was captured and taken in chains to Prague, where he was thrown into prison. He was offered his liberty on condition of making public recantation and becoming either a Catholic or an Utraquist. Augusta was ready to profess himself a Utraquist, but not to recant in public, and he accordingly remained in prison 16 years.

He was imprisoned from 1548 to 1564, during which time he maintained correspondence with other leaders of the Unity but was reluctant to relinquish his leadership role to others but was reconciled to them following his release from prison on the death of Ferdinand. In addition, Augusta included many hymns within his letters, some of which are still preserved today. As a condition of his release, he had to promise not to preach any more. He died in 1572.
