= Hlasivo =

- Municipality
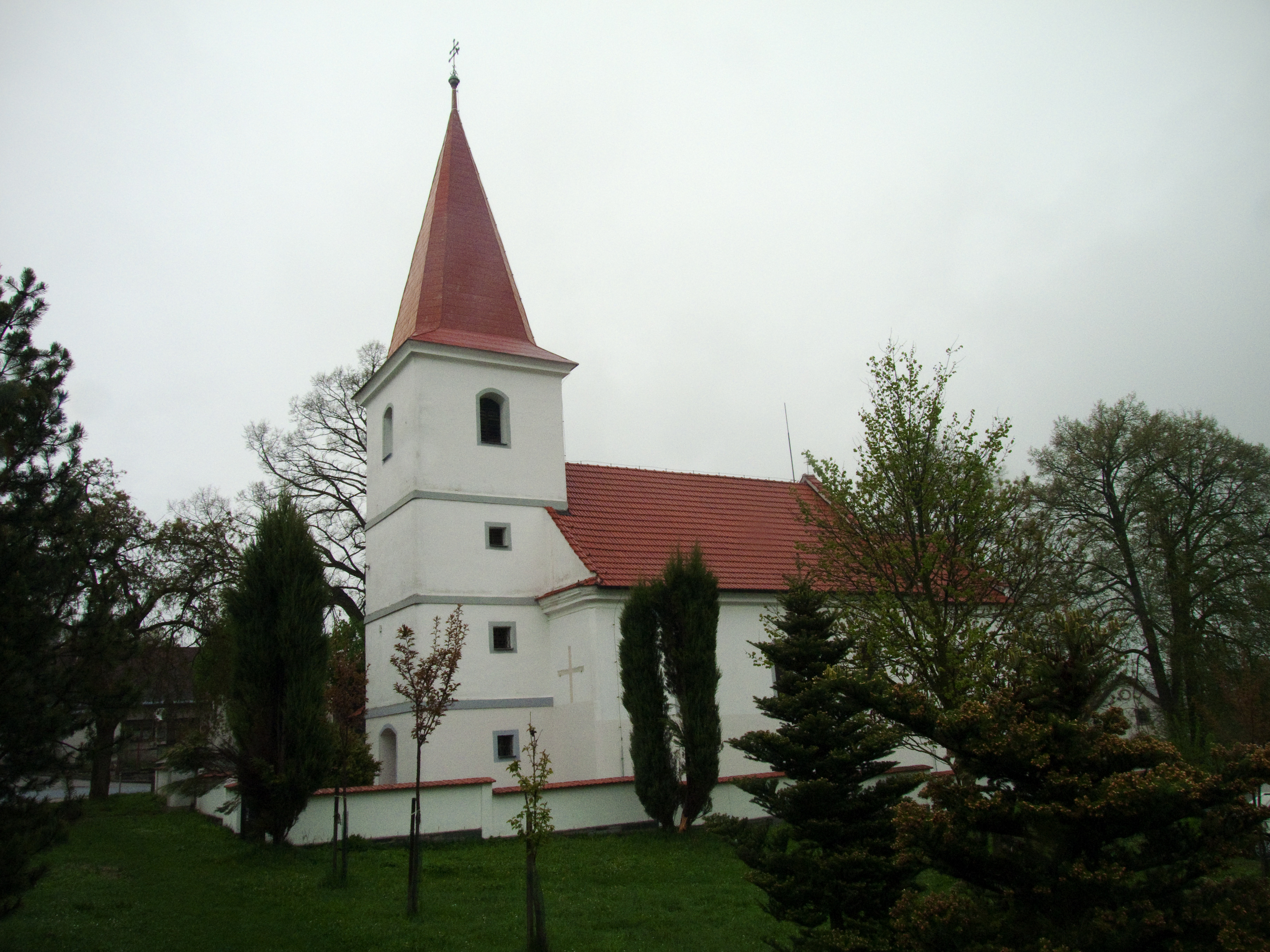
- Church of the Nativity of the Virgin Mary

- Location in the Czech Republic
- Coordinates: 49°29′55″N 14°45′1″E
- Country: Czech Republic
- Region: South Bohemian
- District: Tábor
- First mentioned: 1316

Area
  - Total: 12.26 km^{2} (4.73 sq mi)
- Elevation: 565 m (1,854 ft)

Population (2026-01-01)
  - Total: 133
  - Density: 10.8/km^{2} (28.1/sq mi)
- Time zone: UTC+1 (CET)
  - Summer (DST): UTC+2 (CEST)
- Postal code: 391 43
- Website: www.hlasivo.cz

Hlasivo is a municipality and village in Tábor District in the South Bohemian Region of the Czech Republic. It has about 100 inhabitants.

Hlasivo lies approximately 12 kilometres (7 mi) north-east of Tábor, 62 km (39 mi) north of České Budějovice, and 70 km (43 mi) south of Prague.

== Administrative division ==
Hlasivo consists of four municipal parts (in brackets population according to the 2021 census):

- Hlasivo (117)
- Hlasívko (9)
- Rašovice (11)
- Temešvár (3)

== Demographics ==
Historical population
| Year | Pop. | ±% |
|---|---|---|
| 1869 | 761 | — |
| 1880 | 766 | +0.7% |
| 1890 | 724 | −5.5% |
| 1900 | 668 | −7.7% |
| 1910 | 680 | +1.8% |
| 1921 | 621 | −8.7% |
| 1930 | 530 | −14.7% |
| 1950 | 378 | −28.7% |
| 1961 | 341 | −9.8% |
| 1970 | 289 | −15.2% |
| 1980 | 266 | −8.0% |
| 1991 | 201 | −24.4% |
| 2001 | 174 | −13.4% |
| 2011 | 168 | −3.4% |
| 2021 | 140 | −16.7% |
Source: Censuses
