= Bible of Kralice =

First translation of the Bible into the Czech language

Kralice Bible
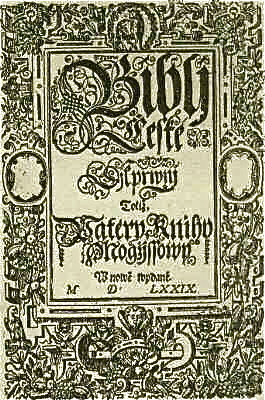
- Bible of Kralice, title page, vol. 1.
- Full name: Biblj ſwatá. To geſt, Kniha w njž se wſſecka Pjſma S. Starého y Nowého Zákona obſahugj (1613 one-volume edition)
- Language: Middle Czech
- Complete Bible published: 1593
- Textual basis: NT: Textus Receptus, Beza's edition (Blahoslav); OT: Masoretic Text, Plantin Polyglot edition
- Copyright: Public domain due to age
- Genesis 1:1–3 Transliteration: Na počátku ſtwořil Bůh nebe a zemi. Země pak byla neſličná a puſtá; a tma byla nad propastj; a Duch Božj wznáſſel se nad wodami. I řekl Bůh: Buď ſwětlo. I bylo ſwětlo. Transcription: Na počátku stvořil Bůh nebe a zemi. Země pak byla nesličná a pustá, a tma byla nad propastí, a Duch Boží vznášel se nad vodami. I řekl Bůh: Buď světlo! I bylo světlo. John 3:16 Transliteration: Nebo tak Bůh milowal ſwět, že Syna ſwého gednorozeného dal, aby každý, kdož wěří v něho, nezahynul, ale měl žiwot wěčný. Transcription: Nebo tak Bůh miloval svět, že Syna svého jednorozeného dal, aby každý, kdož věří v něho, nezahynul, ale měl život věčný.

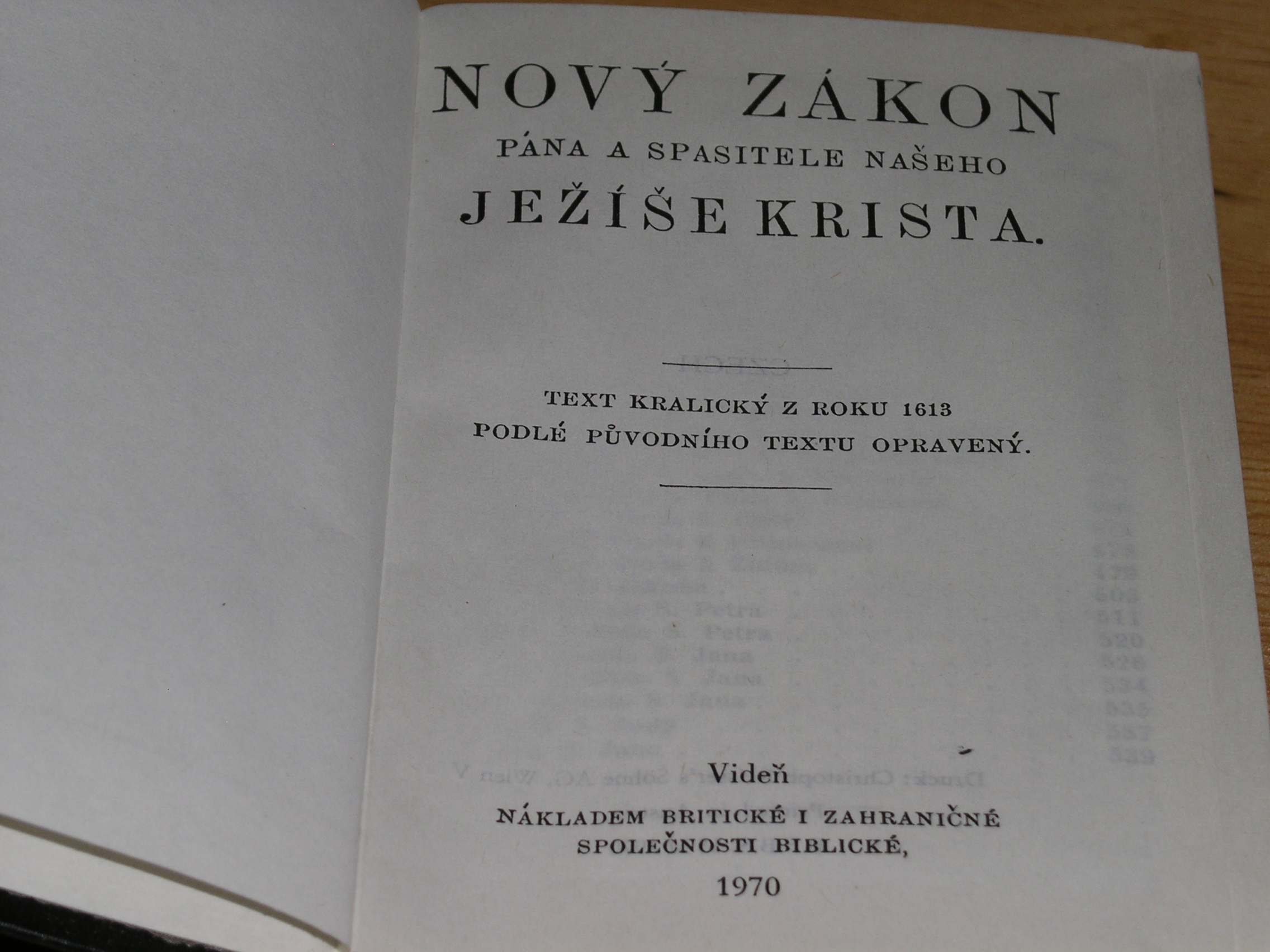

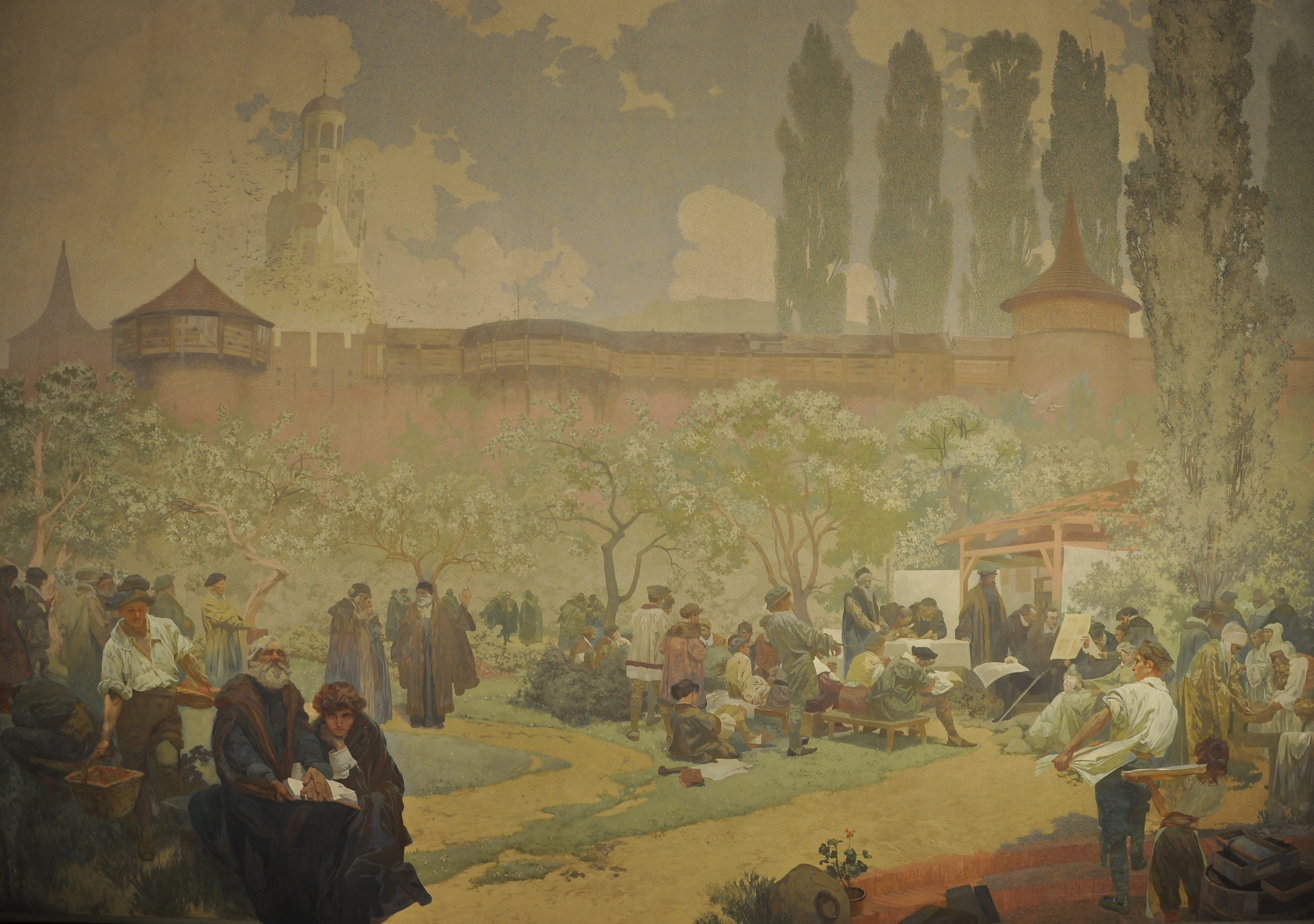
The Printing of the Bible of Kralice in Ivančice (1914), by Alphonse Mucha, The Slav Epic

The Bible of Kralice, also called the Kralice Bible (Czech: Bible kralická), was the first complete translation of the Bible from its original languages into Czech. Translated by the Unity of the Brethren and printed in Kralice nad Oslavou, the first edition had six volumes and was published between 1579 and 1593. The third edition, published in 1613, is considered a classic and has remained through the modern day the most widely-known and commonly-used Czech translation of the Bible. The New Testament had previously been translated from Greek by Jan Blahoslav and published in 1564.

Ten Biblical songs (Czech: Biblické Písně) by Antonín Dvořák
Antonín Dvořák's 1894 setting of selections from Psalms in the Bible of Kralice's translation.

== See also ==
- Bible translations into Czech
- Slavic translations of the Bible
