= Kralice nad Oslavou =

- Municipality
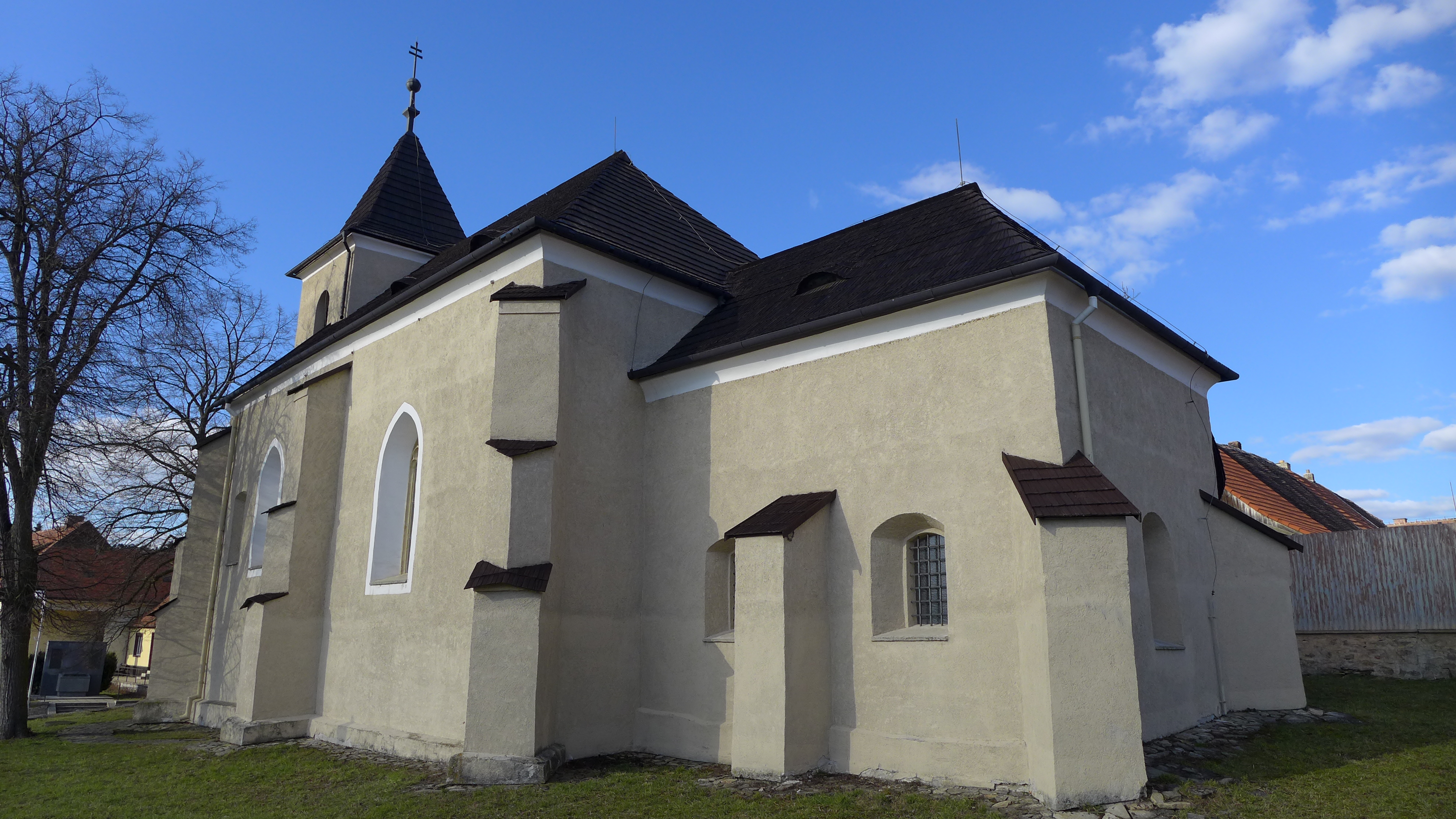
- Church of Saint Martin

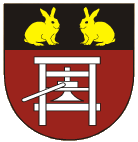
- Flag Coat of arms

- Location in the Czech Republic
- Coordinates: 49°11′58″N 16°12′6″E
- Country: Czech Republic
- Region: Vysočina
- District: Třebíč
- First mentioned: 1379

Area
  - Total: 13.48 km^{2} (5.20 sq mi)
- Elevation: 412 m (1,352 ft)

Population (2026-01-01)
  - Total: 1,012
  - Density: 75.07/km^{2} (194.4/sq mi)
- Time zone: UTC+1 (CET)
  - Summer (DST): UTC+2 (CEST)
- Postal code: 675 73
- Website: www.kralicenosl.cz

Kralice nad Oslavou (until 1960 Kralice) is a municipality and village in Třebíč District in the Vysočina Region of the Czech Republic. It has about 1,000 inhabitants.

== Administrative division ==
Kralice nad Oslavou consists of two municipal parts (in brackets population according to the 2021 census):

- Kralice nad Oslavou (883)
- Horní Lhotice (123)

== Etymology ==
The village was originally named Králice. The name is derived from the Czech word král ('king'), meaning "the village of king's people".

== Geography ==
Kralice nad Oslavou is located about 23 kilometres (14 mi) east of Třebíč and 28 km (17 mi) west of Brno. It lies mostly in the Křižanov Highlands, but the southern part of the municipal territory extends into the Jevišovice Uplands. There are several small fishponds in the territory. The Oslava River, contained in the name of the municipality, flows outside the municipal territory.

== History ==
The first written mention of Kralice is from 1379, when a fortress was here. Among the most notable owners of the village was the Zierotin family.

A secret printing shop of the Unity of the Brethren was hidden in the Kralice Fortress, in which the Bible of Kralice, the first complete translation of the Bible from the original languages into the Czech language, was printed between 1579 and 1593.

== Demographics ==
Historical population

Year	Pop.	±%
1869	804	—
1880	803	−0.1%
1890	890	+10.8%
1900	951	+6.9%
1910	921	−3.2%

Year	Pop.	±%
1921	873	−5.2%
1930	1,003	+14.9%
1950	942	−6.1%
1961	1,004	+6.6%
1970	873	−13.0%

Year	Pop.	±%
1980	828	−5.2%
1991	824	−0.5%
2001	865	+5.0%
2011	963	+11.3%
2021	1,006	+4.5%

Source: Censuses

== Transport ==
The I/23 road (the section from Třebíč to Rosice) runs through the municipality.

Kralice nad Oslavou is located on the railway line Brno–Třebíč.

== Sights ==
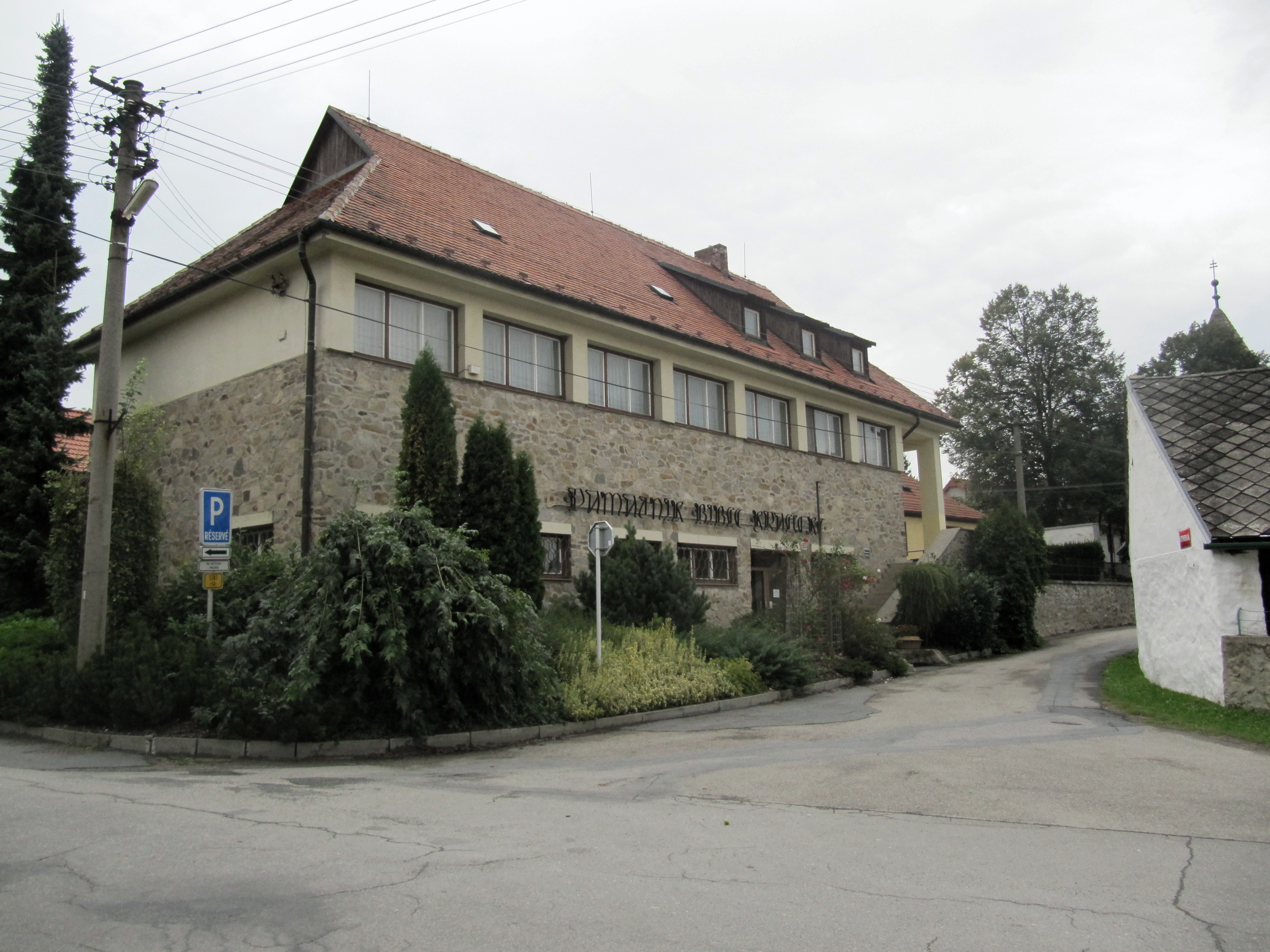
Memorial of the Bible of Kralice

The main landmark of the village is the Church of Saint Martin. It is a Gothic church from the 14th century with Renaissance modifications.

Fragments of the local two-storey fortress have been preserved to this day. Remains of walls and cellars have been preserved, which were discovered during an archaeological survey.

Memorial of the Bible of Kralice was built in 1967–1969. The memorial, managed by Moravské zemské muzeum in Brno, contained an exhibition about local archaeological research, the activities of the Brethren printing house, and an exhibition about J. A. Comenius. However, it was closed until further notice due to technical reasons.

== Notable people ==
- Anna Pammrová (1860–1945), writer, feminist and philosopher
