= Chotýšany =

- Municipality
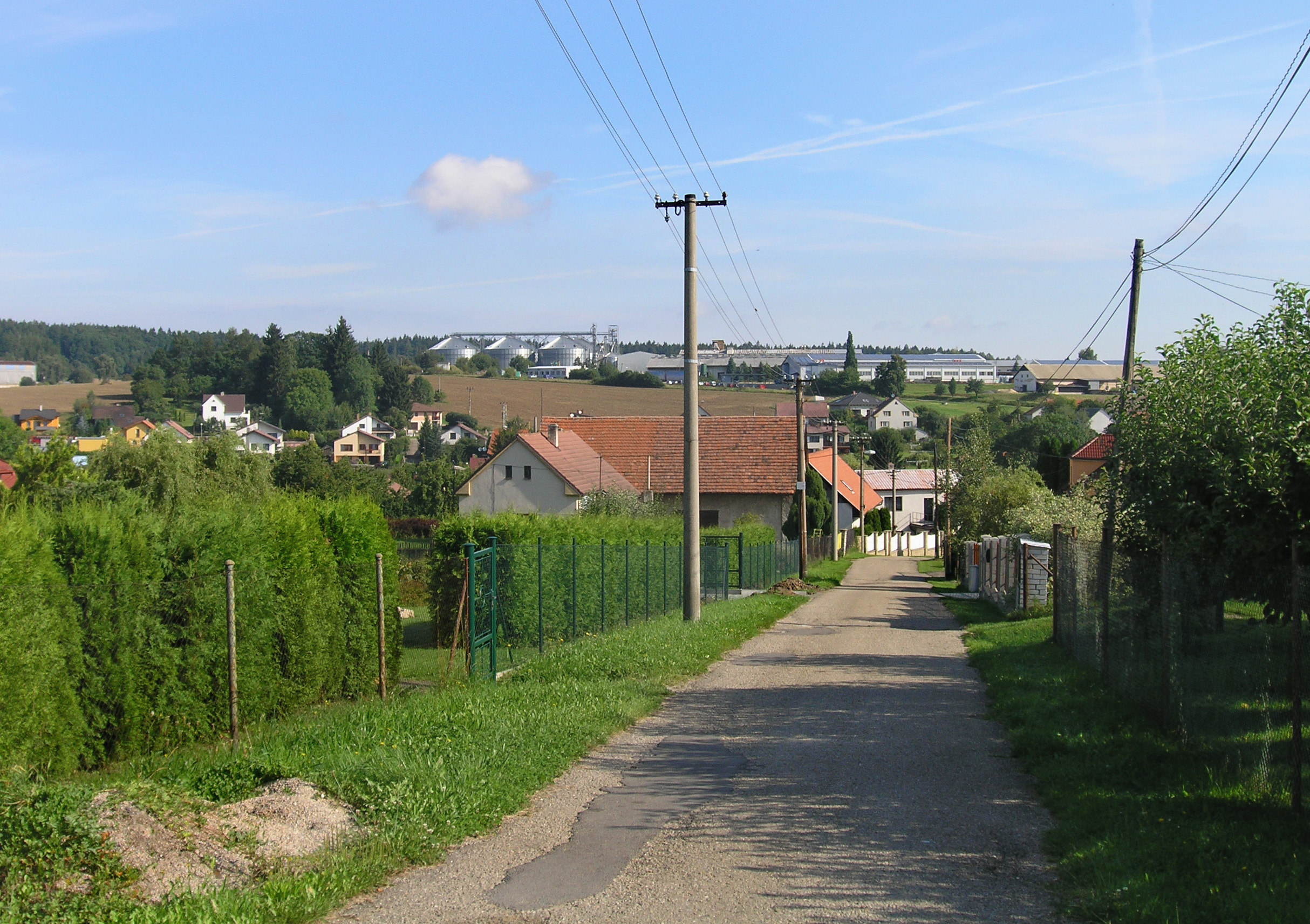
- View from the south

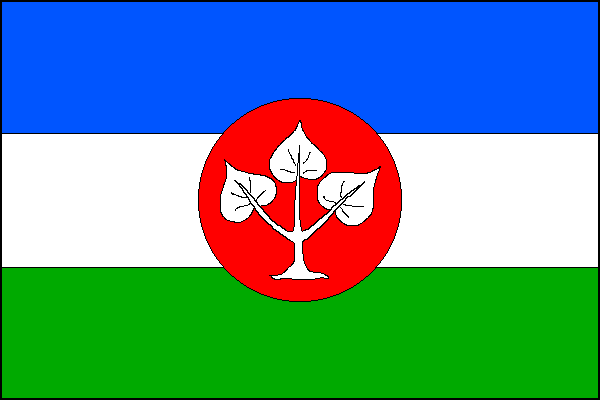
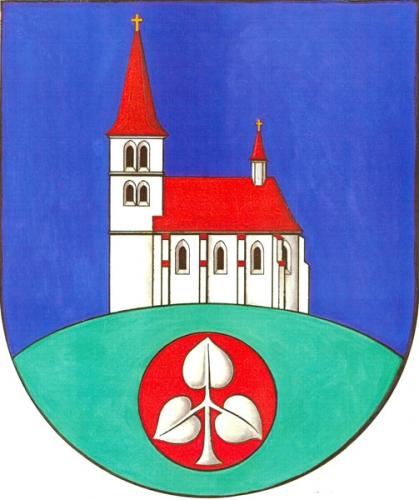
- Flag Coat of arms

- Location in the Czech Republic
- Coordinates: 49°44′39″N 14°48′53″E
- Country: Czech Republic
- Region: Central Bohemian
- District: Benešov
- First mentioned: 1250

Area
  - Total: 13.97 km^{2} (5.39 sq mi)
- Elevation: 450 m (1,480 ft)

Population (2026-01-01)
  - Total: 670
  - Density: 48/km^{2} (120/sq mi)
- Time zone: UTC+1 (CET)
  - Summer (DST): UTC+2 (CEST)
- Postal codes: 257 01, 257 28
- Website: www.chotysany.cz

Chotýšany is a municipality and village in Benešov District in the Central Bohemian Region of the Czech Republic. It has about 700 inhabitants.

== Administrative division ==
Chotýšany consists of four municipal parts (in brackets population according to the 2021 census):

- Chotýšany (459)
- Křemení (47)
- Městečko (92)
- Pařezí (27)

== Etymology ==
The name Chotýšany was derived from the word Chotýšané, which meant either "Chotýš's people" (derived from the personal name Chotýš) or "people who came from Chotýš".

== Geography ==
Chotýšany is located about 16 kilometres (10 mi) east of Benešov and 43 km (27 mi) southeast of Prague. It lies in the Benešov Uplands. The highest point is the hill Vápenný vrch at 497 m (1,631 ft) above sea level. The municipal territory is rich in brooks and fishponds. The Chotýšanka River flows through the municipality.

== History ==
The first written mention of Chotýšany is from 1250.

== Demographics ==
Historical population

Year	Pop.	±%
1869	747	—
1880	827	+10.7%
1890	842	+1.8%
1900	789	−6.3%
1910	714	−9.5%

Year	Pop.	±%
1921	708	−0.8%
1930	596	−15.8%
1950	471	−21.0%
1961	511	+8.5%
1970	475	−7.0%

Year	Pop.	±%
1980	462	−2.7%
1991	471	+1.9%
2001	456	−3.2%
2011	491	+7.7%
2021	625	+27.3%

Source: Censuses

== Transport ==
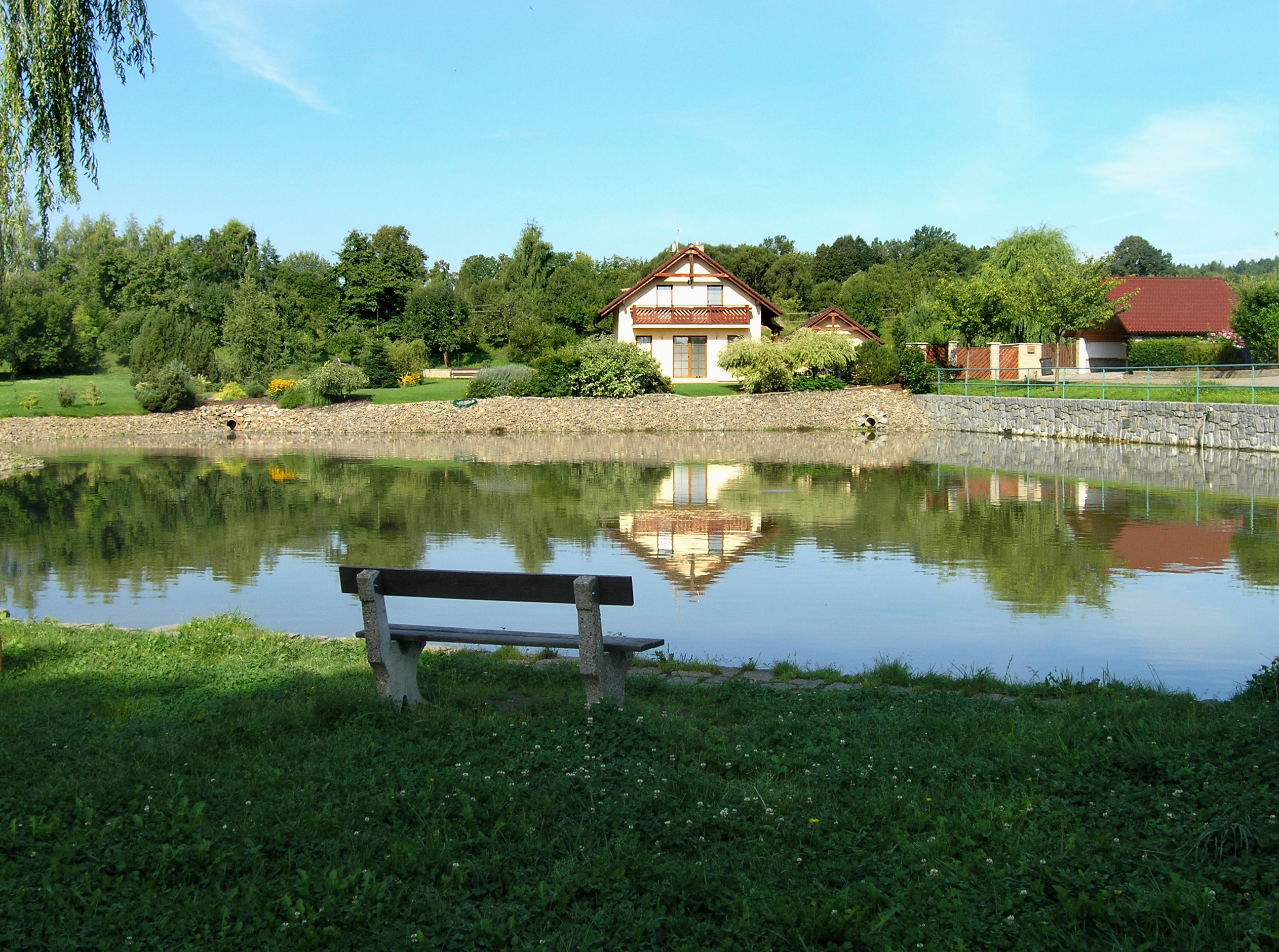
Common pond

The railway line Benešov–Vlašim runs through the municipality. In the municipal territory is the Lhota Veselka train stop, primarily serving the neighbouring village of Lhota Veselka. The stop Městečko u Benešova near Městečko is located just outside the municipal territory.

== Sights ==
The most important monument is the Church of Saint Gall. It was first documented in 1357. Originally a Romanesque building, it was rebuilt into its present Gothic form. The façade is the result of neo-Gothic modifications.

The Chotýšany Castle was built in the first half of the 18th century next to remains of a medieval fortress. The southern wing is baroque; the northwern neo-Gothic wing was added in the mid-19th century. Today the buildings of the castle are dilapidated and unused.
