= 1437 =

Calendar year and important year to Germany

1437 in various calendars
- Gregorian calendar: 1437; MCDXXXVII
- Ab urbe condita: 2190
- Armenian calendar: 886; ԹՎ ՊՁԶ
- Assyrian calendar: 6187
- Balinese saka calendar: 1358–1359
- Bengali calendar: 843–844
- Berber calendar: 2387
- English Regnal year: 15 Hen. 6 – 16 Hen. 6
- Buddhist calendar: 1981
- Burmese calendar: 799
- Byzantine calendar: 6945–6946
- Chinese calendar: 丙辰年 (Fire Dragon); 4134 or 3927 — to — 丁巳年 (Fire Snake); 4135 or 3928
- Coptic calendar: 1153–1154
- Discordian calendar: 2603
- Ethiopian calendar: 1429–1430
- Hebrew calendar: 5197–5198
- Hindu calendars
- Vikram Samvat: 1493–1494
- Shaka Samvat: 1358–1359
- Kali Yuga: 4537–4538
- Holocene calendar: 11437
- Igbo calendar: 437–438
- Iranian calendar: 815–816
- Islamic calendar: 840–841
- Japanese calendar: Eikyō 9 (永享９年)
- Javanese calendar: 1352–1353
- Julian calendar: 1437; MCDXXXVII
- Korean calendar: 3770
- Minguo calendar: 475 before ROC 民前475年
- Nanakshahi calendar: −31
- Thai solar calendar: 1979–1980
- Tibetan calendar: མེ་ཕོ་འབྲུག་ལོ་ (male Fire-Dragon); 1563 or 1182 or 410 — to — མེ་མོ་སྦྲུལ་ལོ་ (female Fire-Snake); 1564 or 1183 or 411

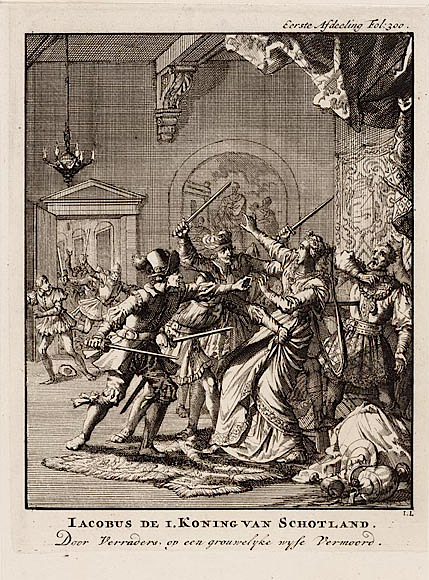
February 21: King James of Scotland is assassinated.

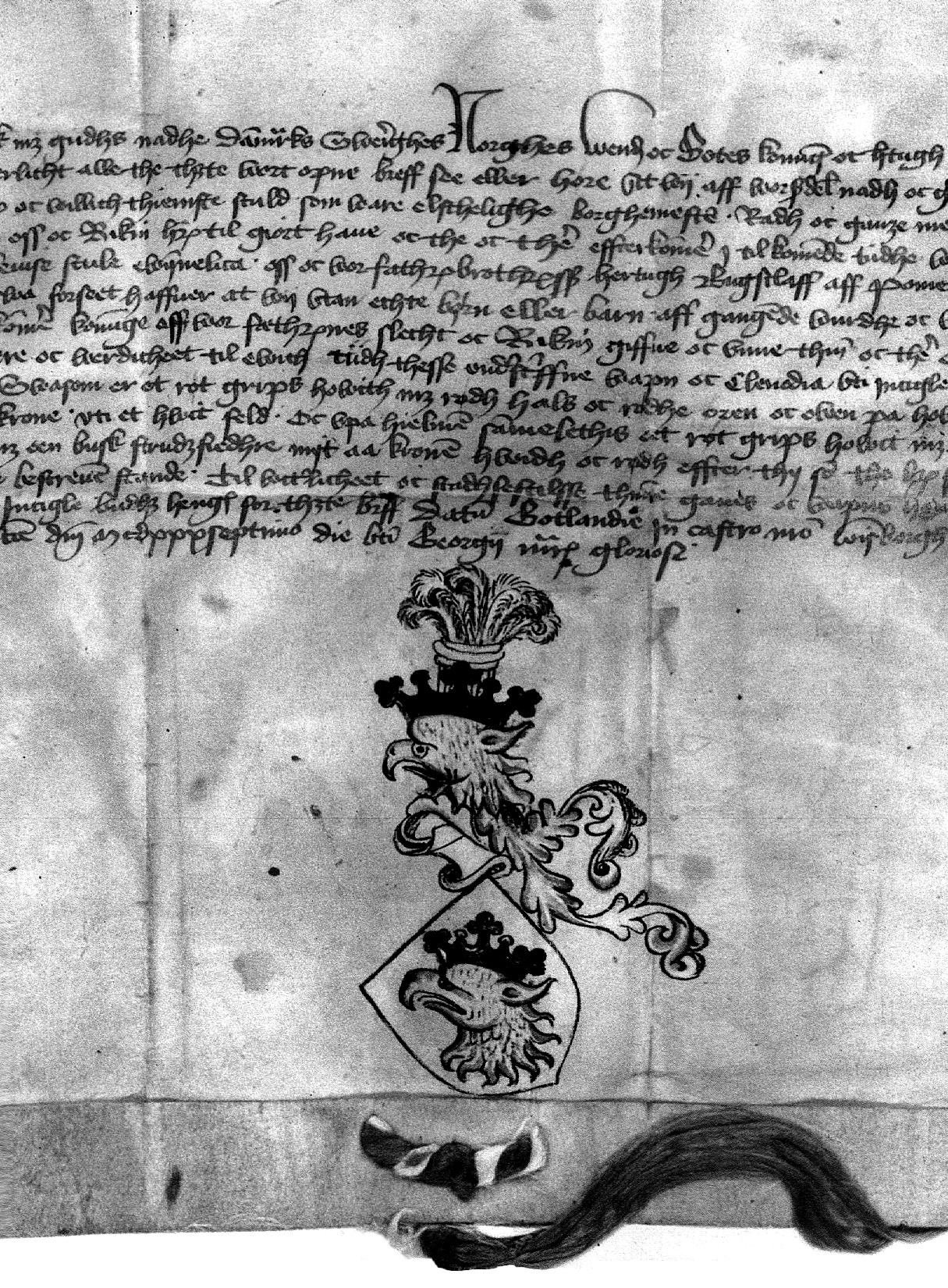
The letter from Erik of Pomerania to Malmö, about its coat of arms

Year 1437 (MCDXXXVII) was a common year starting on Tuesday of the Julian calendar.

== Events ==
=== January–March ===
- January 15– The Compacts of Basel are ratified by the Council of Basel in Switzerland, as the Roman Catholic Church ends its campaign against the Hussites. Among other things, the Church authorizes Hussite priests to administer sacramental wine to their congregations as part of the Communion during the Eucharist before Easter without declaring the same to be heresy, but stops short of allowing the Communion wafer.
- January 17 – Battle of Hällaskogen, Sweden: Rebels from the cities of Arboga, Köping, and Örebro, led by Erik Puke, defeat the troops sent by King Karl Knutsson. Puke is captured a few weeks later, and beheaded on February 13.
- January 21– The English Parliament, summoned in the name of King Henry VI on October 29, assembles at Westminster. The House of Commons elects the ailing John Tyrrell as its Speaker.
- February 13– In France, English troops led by the Earl of Shrewsbury capture the town of Pontoise, less than 18 miles (29 km) from Paris, and threaten the royal capital before being forced to abandon their position.
- February 21– King James I of Scotland is assassinated in an attempted coup d'état led by his uncle and former ally, Walter Stewart, Earl of Atholl. The night before, the King and his wife, Catherine Douglas had stopped at Blackfriars monastery in Perth. Queen Catherine is injured while barring the door with her arm in order to allow the King to escape, and King James is found in the early hours of the morning and stabbed to death while trying to escape.
- March 11– The nova Scorpii AD 1437 is first observed, and is seen by Korean astronomers at Seoul. It remains visible until March 25.
- March 24– In Italy, Tomaso di Campofregoso, the Doge of the Republic of Genoa is forced to step down in favor of his brother, Battista di Campofregoso, however, changes his mind later in the day and Tomaso is re-installed as the doge.
- March 25 – In a ceremony in Holyrood Abbey, six-year old Prince James is crowned as James II of Scotland by Pope Eugene IV. For the security of the crown, the capital of Scotland is moved from Dunfermline to Edinburgh.
- March 26 – In Scotland, Walter Stewart, Earl of Atholl, at one time the heir presumptive to the Scottish throne until the birth of James II, is brutally executed for the assassination of King James I. A red hot iron crown placed upon his head, after which he is cut into pieces while still alive and his heart was taken out, after which his body is thrown into a fire.
- March 27 – The regents for King Henry VI give royal assent to the legislation passed by the English Parliament, including the Marshalsea Act; the Exportation of Corn Act (excusing licensing fees of small amounts of grain, at less than 6 shillings, 8 pence for wheat or 3 shillings for barley); and the Guilds and Fraternities Act.

=== April–June ===
- April 2 – A bubonic plague epidemic strikes the independent city of Ragusa (modern-day Dubrovnik in Croatia), capital of the Republic of Ragusa, and a group of 10 patricians reject the chance to flee, staying to govern the city. Within 15 days, nine of the ten are dead, and only Marin Simunov Rastic survives. The progress of the plague, which lasts for more than two months, is chronicled by an Italian-born resident, Opis Diversis.
- April 23 – Malmö, at this time in Denmark, receives its current coat of arms.
- April 23 – Pope Eugene IV issues the papal bull Dominatur Dominus, further to safeguard the rights of the Guanches, the natives of the Portuguese-controlled Canary Islands.
- May 1 – In Bohemia, Sion Castle near Kutná Hora in the modern-day Czech Republic is besieged by royal forces sent by the Emperor Sigismund of Luxembourg and commanded by his Hofmeister, Hynce Ptáček of Pirkštejn. The siege, defended by the Taborite Hussite Jan Roháč of Dubá, lasts for four months before succeeding.
- May 18 (Full moon of Nayon 799 M.E.) – In Burma, King Mohnyin Thado of Ava announces that, effective March 30, 1438, the year will be recalibrated after 799 M.E. to will become 2 M.E., as part of the recommendations of his astrologers.
- May 21 – During a visit by Phillip III of Burgundy, who still controls parts of France while his war against King Charles VI continues, rebels in the city of Bruges take over and lynch his representative, Marshal Jean de Villiers de L'Isle-Adam, while Philip himself narrowly escapes capture.
- June 6 – A peasant army gathers at Babolna during the Transylvanian peasant revolt against King Sigismund of Hungary and defeat the Hungarian Governor, Ladislaus Csaki.
- June 24 – On the feast day of St. John the Baptist, the plague in Ragusa is declared at an end.

=== July–September ===
- July 6– The Transylvanian peasant revolt comes to an end with a formal treaty signed at the monastery of Cluj-Manastur, reducing the tithe to be paid to their employers, and abolishing the tax requiring surrendering one-ninth of each individual's production of wine and grain, and confirming the right of peasants to move freely within Transylvania.
- August 22– Portugal's disastrous Tangier expedition to attack Morocco begins as Prince Henry the Navigator and more than 6,000 troops (3,000 knights, 2,000 infantry, 1,000 archers) sail from the port of Belém toward Africa and the Portuguese colony of Ceuta. They arrive at Ceuta five days later.
- September 20–
  - Led by Prince Henry the Navigator, a poorly-prepared Portuguese attempt to conquer the city of Tangier in the Marinid Sultanate in Morocco begins. Although the Portuguese have more than 6,000 troops, they reach the walled city and find that their scaling ladders are too short to reach the top, and their artillery is too weak to damage the walls.
  - The siege of Sion Castle in Bohemia by the armies of the Emperor Sigismund of Luxembourg is successful.
- September 30– A Moroccan relief force of at least 10,000 cavalry and 90,000 foot soldiers arrives at Tangier to halt Portugal's assault on Tangier.

=== October–December ===
- October 5 – The Portuguese, reinforced with better equipment and having routed the Moroccans two days earlier, make a second assault on Tangier and fail.
- October 9 – A counterattack on the Portuguese troops' camp, with additional troops led by the Moroccan grand vizier, Abu Zakariya Yahya al-Wattasi, forces the Portuguese to flee to their ships but King Henry's son, Prince Ferdinand, is taken as a prisoner of war.
- October 15 – Prince Henry the Navigator (Henrique, o Navegador), brother of King Duarte of Portugal, agrees on behalf Portugal to cede its North African colony of Ceuta back to Morocco in return for being allowed to withdraw all of his troops, including those taken prisoner.
- October 19 – After negotiating a surrender and exchanging prisoners of war with the Moroccans, the Portuguese troops leave Tangier and sail away from Morocco.
- November 1 – On All Saints Day, five weeks before his 16th birthday, King Henry VI of England has a second coronation ceremony at Merton Priory, near London. Henry had previously been crowned in 1429 at Westminster at the age of seven.
- November 12 – King Charles VII of France and his son Prince Louis ride into Paris for the first time in 17 years after the royal family had fled from the invasion by the Duke of Burgundy in 1420.
- November 13 – England's Privy Council votes to confirm the independent authority of King Henry.
- December 6 – King Henry VI reaches the age of majority on his 16th birthday and is deemed ready to rule the Kingdom of England in his own right.
- December 9 – Sigismund, Holy Roman Emperor, dies, and is succeeded by Frederick III.

=== Date unknown ===
- Sandside Chase in the north of Scotland: Clan Mackay defeat the Clan Gunn of Caithness.
- The Kazan Khanate is established.
- Ulugh Beg's Zij-i Sultani star catalogue is published.

== Births ==
- March 7 – Anna of Saxony, Electress of Brandenburg (d. 1512)
- April 30 – János Thurzó, Hungarian businessman (d. 1508)
- July 22 – John Scrope, 5th Baron Scrope of Bolton, English Baron (d. 1498)
- October 4 – John IV, Duke of Bavaria (d. 1463)
- date unknown – Isaac Abravanel, Jewish statesman (d. 1508)
- probable – Elizabeth Woodville, Queen consort of King Edward IV of England (d. 1492)

== Deaths ==
- January 3 – Catherine of Valois, queen of Henry V of England (b. 1401)
- January 22 – Niccolò de' Niccoli, Italian Renaissance humanist (b. 1364)
- February 21 – King James I of Scotland (b. 1394) (murdered)
- March 26 – Walter Stewart, Earl of Atholl, Scottish nobleman and regicide (executed)
- June 10 – Joan of Navarre, Queen of England (b. 1370)
- November 20 – Thomas Langley, cardinal bishop of Durham and lord chancellor of England (b. 1363)
- December 9 – Sigismund, Holy Roman Emperor (b. 1368)
- date unknown – John II Stanley of the Isle of Man
