= Chlístovice =

- Municipality
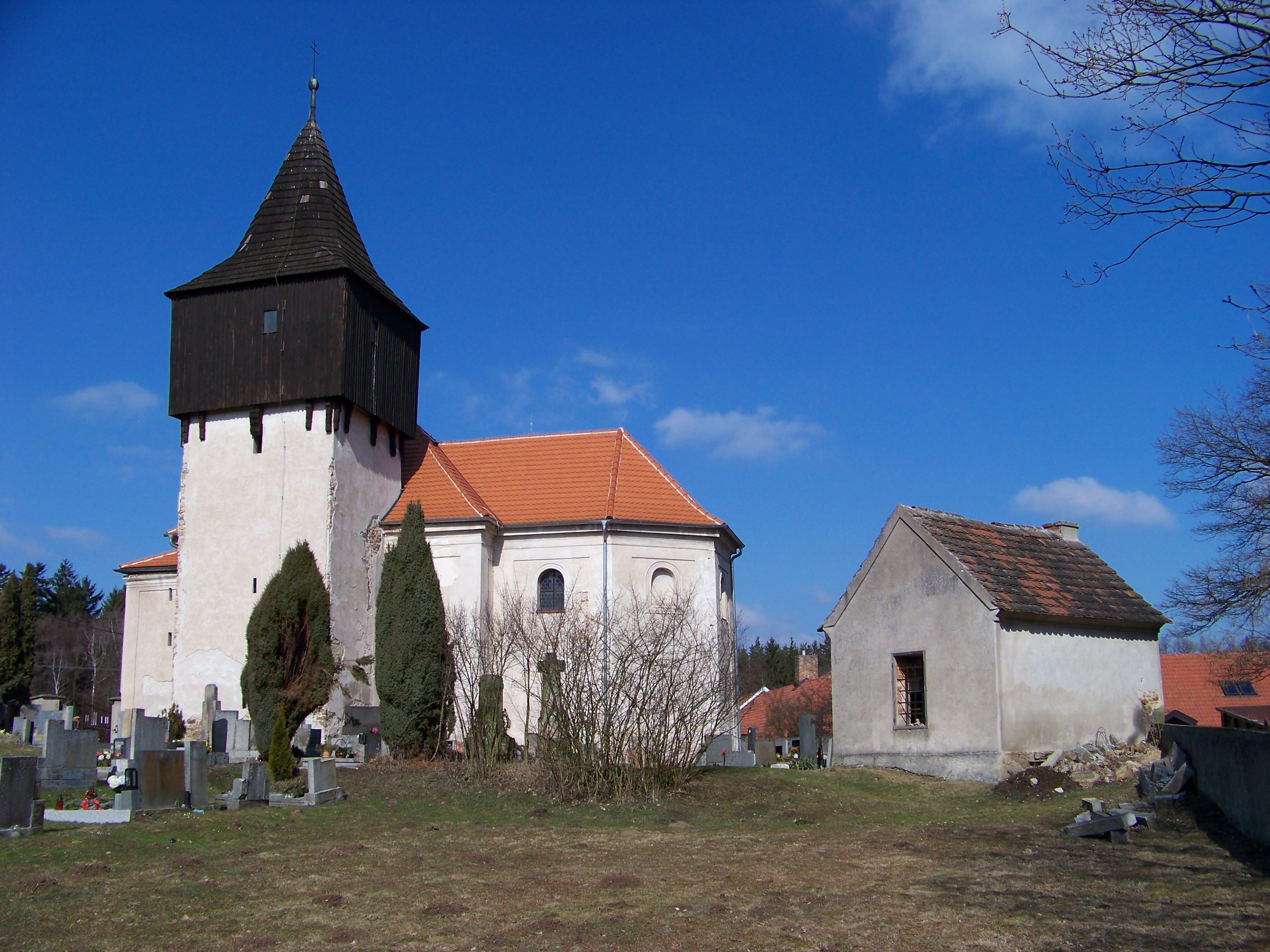
- Church of Saint Andrew

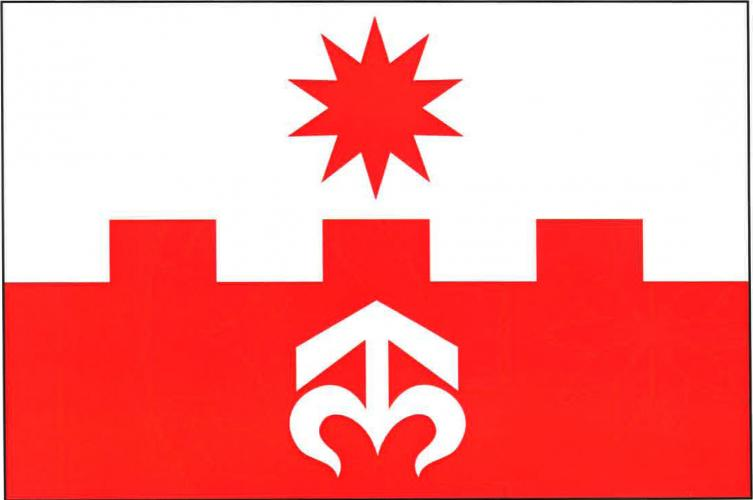
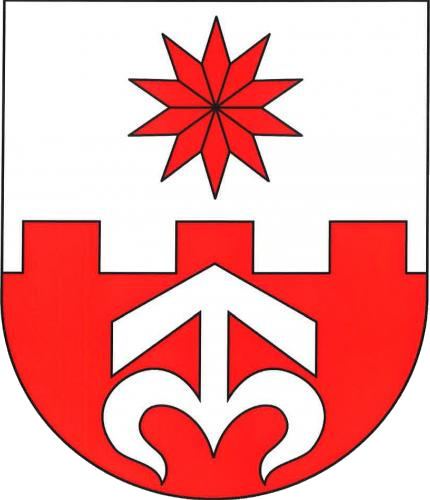
- Flag Coat of arms

- Location in the Czech Republic
- Coordinates: 49°53′9″N 15°12′9″E
- Country: Czech Republic
- Region: Central Bohemian
- District: Kutná Hora
- First mentioned: 1359

Area
  - Total: 29.50 km^{2} (11.39 sq mi)
- Elevation: 392 m (1,286 ft)

Population (2026-01-01)
  - Total: 779
  - Density: 26.4/km^{2} (68.4/sq mi)
- Time zone: UTC+1 (CET)
  - Summer (DST): UTC+2 (CEST)
- Postal codes: 284 01, 285 04
- Website: www.obec-chlistovice.cz

Chlístovice is a municipality and village in Kutná Hora District in the Central Bohemian Region of the Czech Republic. It has about 800 inhabitants.

== Administrative division ==
Chlístovice consists of 11 municipal parts (in brackets population according to the 2021 census):

- Chlístovice (329)
- Chroustkov (36)
- Kralice (81)
- Kraličky (13)
- Pivnisko (36)
- Švábínov (0)
- Svatý Jan t. Krsovice (36)
- Vernýřov (24)
- Všesoky (25)
- Žandov (92)
- Zdeslavice (58)

== Etymology ==
The name is derived from the personal name Chlíst, meaning "the village of Chlíst's people".

== Geography ==
Chlístovice is located about 8 kilometres (5 mi) southwest of Kutná Hora and 50 km (31 mi) southeast of Prague. It lies in the Upper Sázava Hills. The highest point is the hill Březina at 555 m (1,821 ft) above sea level, which is also the highest point of Kutná Hora District. The Vrchlice Stream flows along the eastern municipal border.

== History ==
The first written mention of Chlístovice is from 1359.

== Demographics ==
Historical population

Year	Pop.	±%
1869	2,088	—
1880	2,084	−0.2%
1890	2,026	−2.8%
1900	1,962	−3.2%
1910	1,925	−1.9%

Year	Pop.	±%
1921	1,803	−6.3%
1930	1,613	−10.5%
1950	1,156	−28.3%
1961	1,064	−8.0%
1970	899	−15.5%

Year	Pop.	±%
1980	778	−13.5%
1991	701	−9.9%
2001	707	+0.9%
2011	694	−1.8%
2021	730	+5.2%

Source: Censuses

== Transport ==
There are no railways or major roads passing through the municipality.

== Sights ==
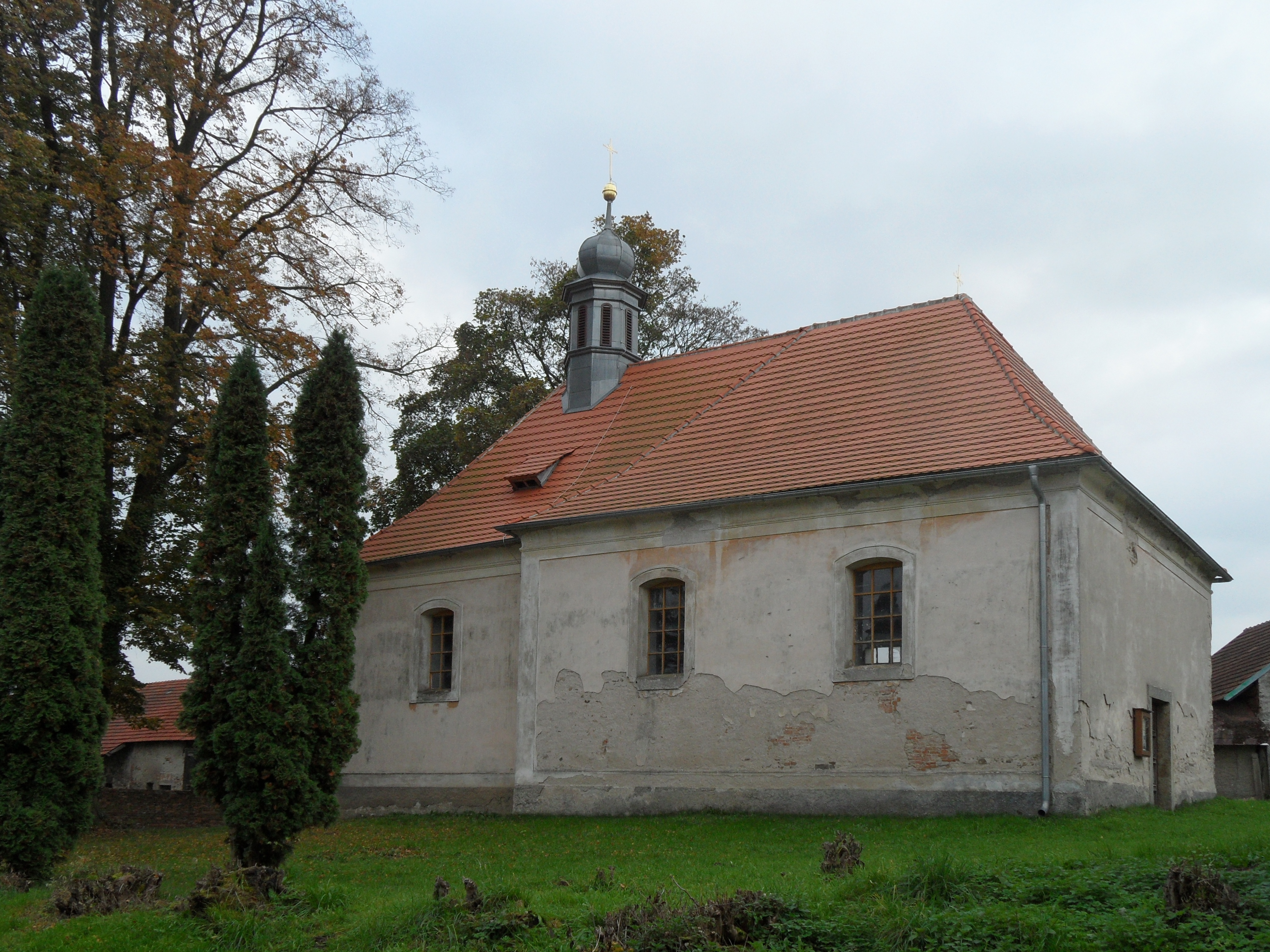
Church of Saint John the Baptist

The Church of Saint Andrew was originally a late Gothic cemetery church, rebuilt in the Baroque style at the beginning of the 18th century. It has an atypical tower with a wooden floor.

Near the Church of Saint Andrew is the ruin of Sion Castle, where the Hussite marshal Jan Roháč of Dubá made his last stand. It was built in the 1420s or 1430s, but was besieged, captured, and destroyed in 1437.

The Church of Saint John the Baptist is located in Svatý Jan t. Krsovice. It was built in the Baroque style in 1768–1772. It replaced a medieval church from the 13th century, which fell into disrepair and was therefore demolished.

On the Březina hill is a steel telecommunication tower, which also serves as an observation tower. There are 109 steps to the top.
