= Lipany (Vitice) =

- Village
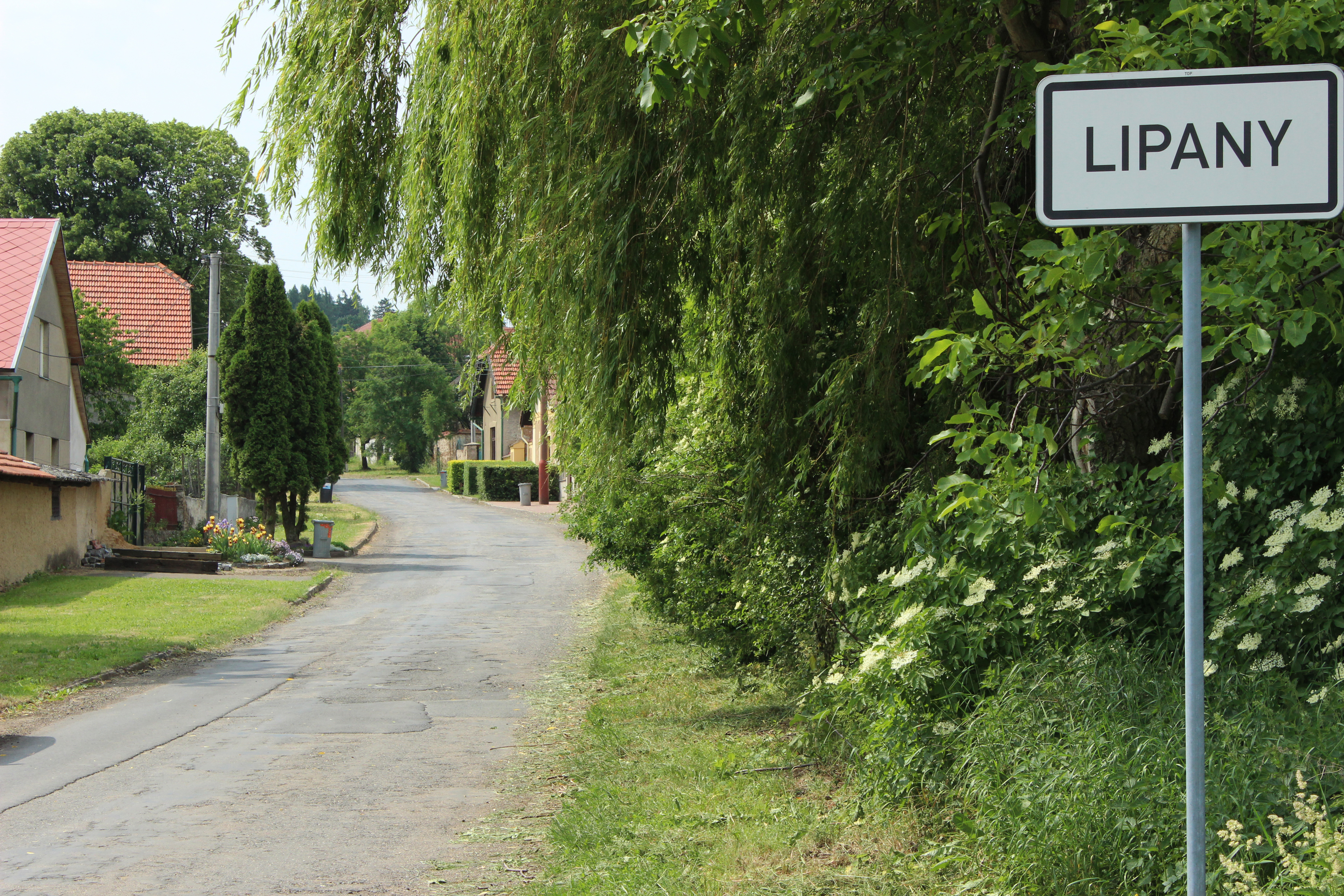
- Entrance to Lipany

- Location in the Czech Republic
- Coordinates: 50°2′5″N 14°56′22″E
- Country: Czech Republic
- Region: Central Bohemian
- District: Kolín
- Municipality: Vitice
- First mentioned: 1357

Area
  - Total: 3.22 km^{2} (1.24 sq mi)
- Elevation: 306 m (1,004 ft)

Population (2021)
  - Total: 107
  - Density: 33.2/km^{2} (86.1/sq mi)
- Time zone: UTC+1 (CET)
  - Summer (DST): UTC+2 (CEST)
- Postal code: 281 63

Lipany is a village and municipal part of Vitice in Kolín District in the Central Bohemian Region of the Czech Republic. It has about 100 inhabitants.

The Battle of Lipany took place in the area between Lipany and Vitice on 30 May 1434.

== Demographics ==
Historical population
Year	Pop.	±%
1869	195	—
1880	275	+41.0%
1890	288	+4.7%
1900	265	−8.0%
1910	256	−3.4%
1921	243	−5.1%
1930	244	+0.4%
1950	166	−32.0%
1961	164	−1.2%
1970	149	−9.1%
1980	129	−13.4%
1991	114	−11.6%
2001	96	−15.8%
2011	110	+14.6%
2021	107	−2.7%
Source: Censuses
