= Malešov =

- Market town
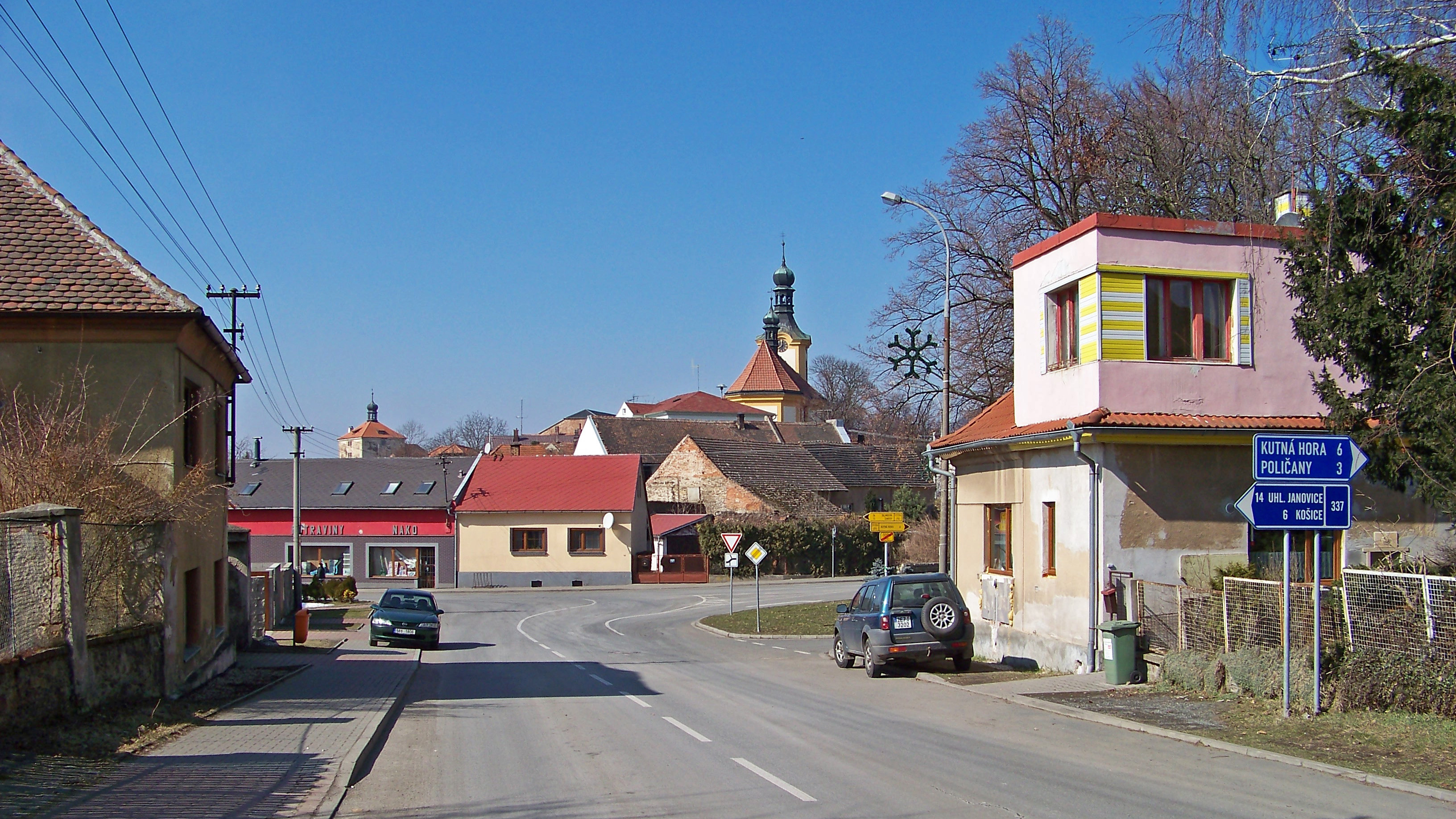
- View towards the Church of Saint Wenceslaus

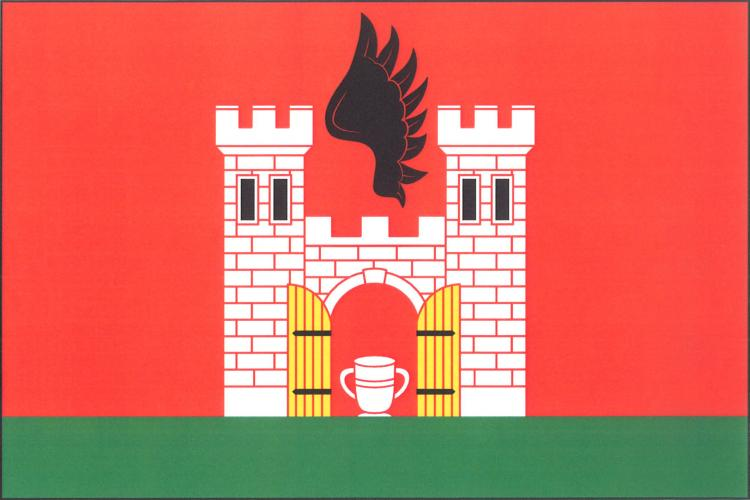
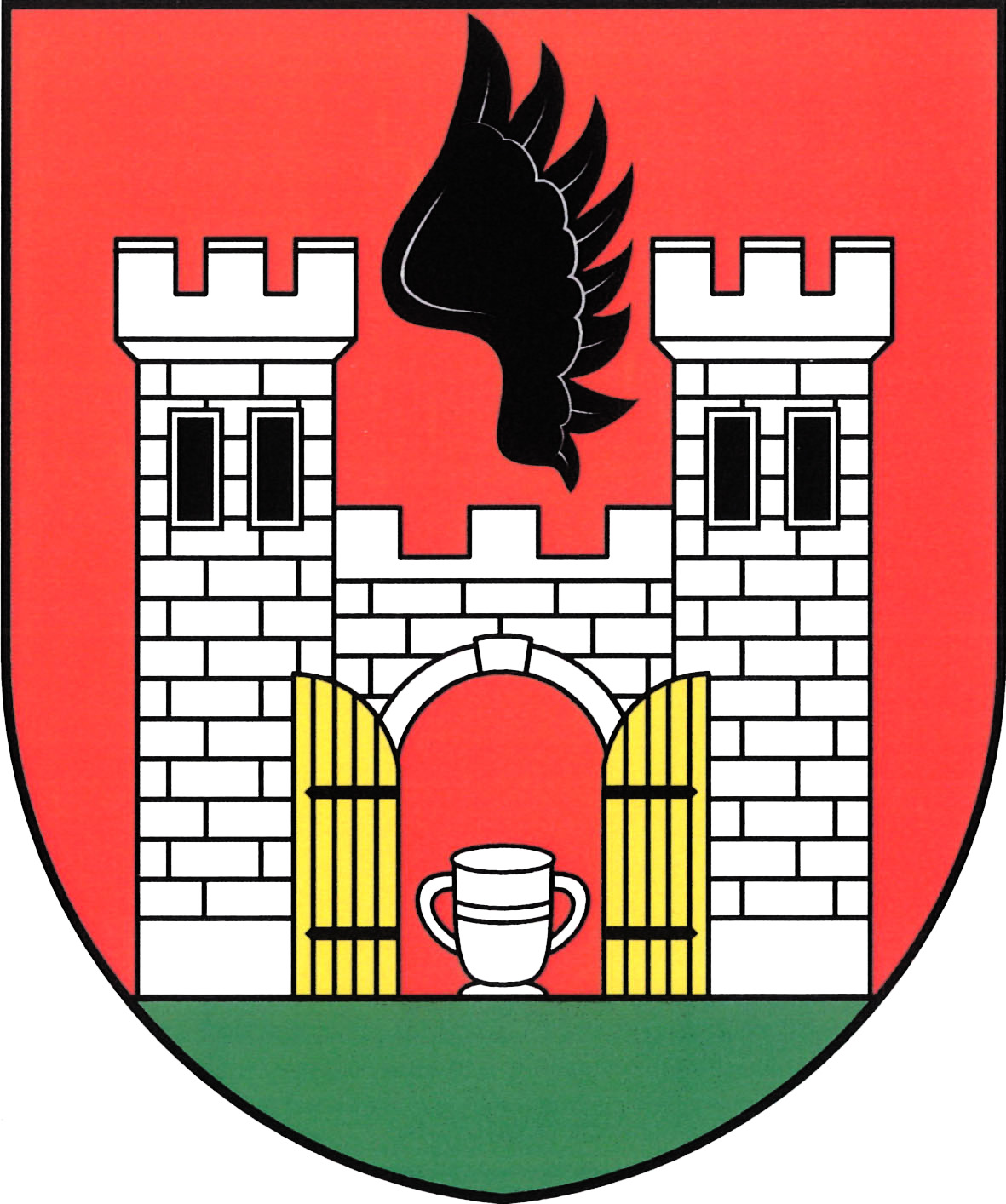
- Flag Coat of arms

- Location in the Czech Republic
- Coordinates: 49°54′38″N 15°13′34″E
- Country: Czech Republic
- Region: Central Bohemian
- District: Kutná Hora
- First mentioned: 1303

Area
  - Total: 14.28 km^{2} (5.51 sq mi)
- Elevation: 330 m (1,080 ft)

Population (2026-01-01)
  - Total: 1,065
  - Density: 74.58/km^{2} (193.2/sq mi)
- Time zone: UTC+1 (CET)
  - Summer (DST): UTC+2 (CEST)
- Postal code: 285 41
- Website: www.malesov-kh.cz

Malešov (Czech pronunciation: [ˈmalɛʃof]; German: Maleschau) is a market town in Kutná Hora District in the Central Bohemian Region of the Czech Republic. It has about 1,100 inhabitants. The historic centre is well preserved and is protected as an urban monument zone.

== Administrative division ==
Malešov consists of five municipal parts (in brackets population according to the 2021 census):

- Malešov (865)
- Albrechtice (15)
- Maxovna (45)
- Polánka (42)
- Týniště (46)

== Etymology ==
The name is derived from the personal name Maleš, meaning "Maleš's (court)".

== Geography ==
Malešov is located about 5 kilometres (3 mi) south of Kutná Hora and 52 km (32 mi) east of Prague. It lies in the Upper Sázava Hills. The highest point is at 423 m (1,388 ft) above sea level. The Vrchlice Stream flows through the municipal territory. Vrchlice Reservoir and the fishpond Hamerský rybník are located on the stream.

== History ==
The first written mention of Malešov is from 1303. In June 1424, Jan Žižka's radical Hussites army defeated the resisting Prague Hussites in the Battle of Malešov.

== Demographics ==
Historical population

Year	Pop.	±%
1869	1,546	—
1880	1,397	−9.6%
1890	1,378	−1.4%
1900	1,358	−1.5%
1910	1,461	+7.6%

Year	Pop.	±%
1921	1,390	−4.9%
1930	1,472	+5.9%
1950	1,225	−16.8%
1961	1,229	+0.3%
1970	1,114	−9.4%

Year	Pop.	±%
1980	1,041	−6.6%
1991	903	−13.3%
2001	863	−4.4%
2011	966	+11.9%
2021	1,013	+4.9%

Source: Censuses

== Transport ==
Malešov is located on the railway line Kutná Hora–Zruč nad Sázavou.

== Sights ==
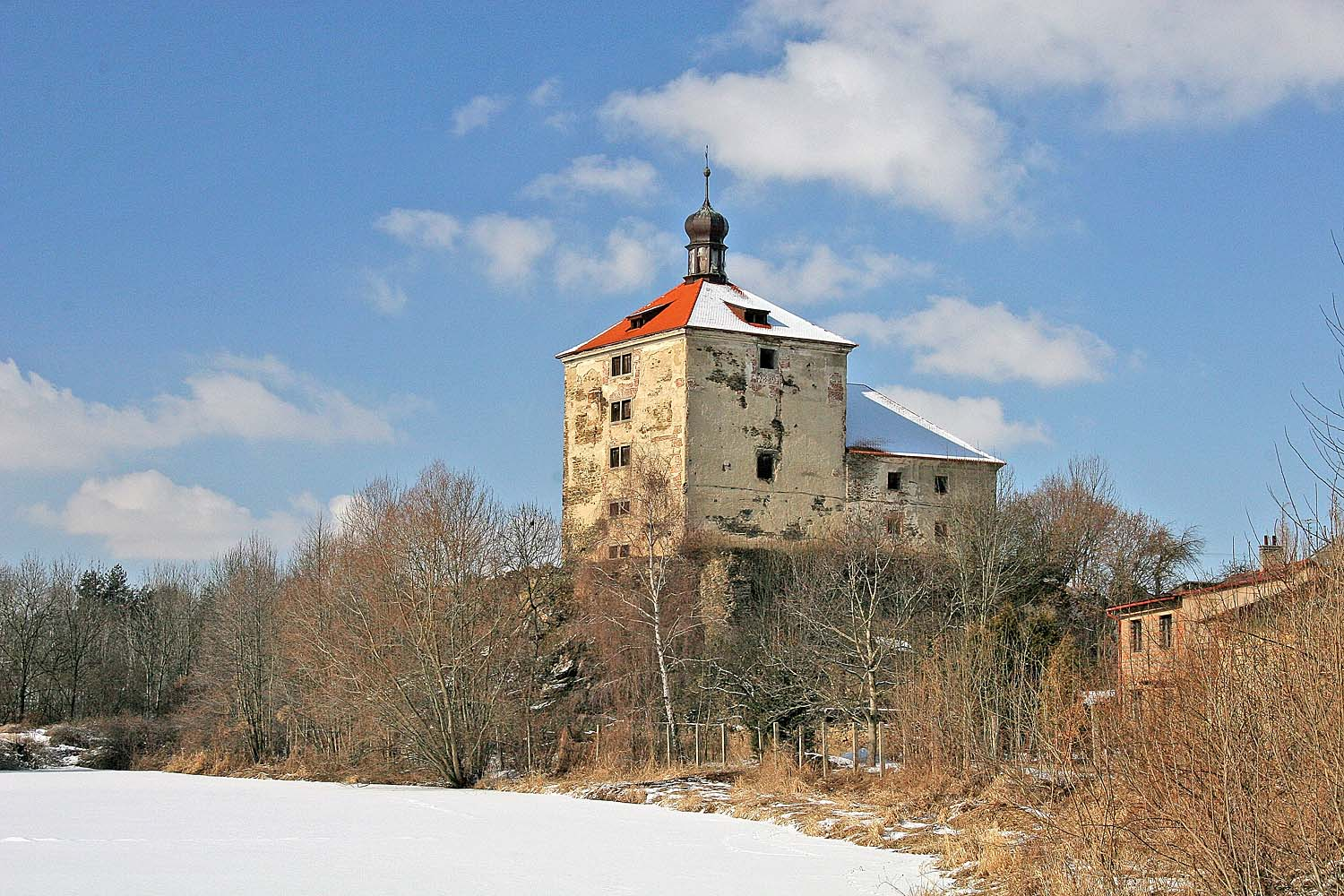
Malešov Fortress

The Malešov Fortress is a notable medieval monument. It was probably built in the first half of the 14th century. During the Thirty Years' War, it was abandoned, but in 1666, it became the administrative centre of the estate, then owned by the Sporck family. In the 1820s, Empire modifications were made. From the mid-19th century, the fortress area fell into disrepair and was abandoned. In 1850, one tower collapsed. At the end of the 19th century, the remains of the residential building were removed. The surviving core of the fortress was repaired in 2002–2003. It is one of the largest preserved residential towers of Czech fortresses.

The Malešov Castle was probably built in the first third of the 18th century. It is a small Baroque castle with a neoclassical façade.

The Church of Saint Wenceslaus is the main landmark of the town square. It was built in the Baroque style in 1731–1733. It replaced a wooden chapel, destroyed by fire in 1729.

== Notable people ==
- Charles Jonas (1840–1896), Czech-American journalist, linguist and politician
- Hugo Meisl (1881–1937), Austrian football coach
