= Battle of Lipany =

Fought at Lipany, Vitice in 1434 during the Hussite Wars

Coordinates: 50°01′43″N 14°56′13″E

- Part of the Hussite Wars
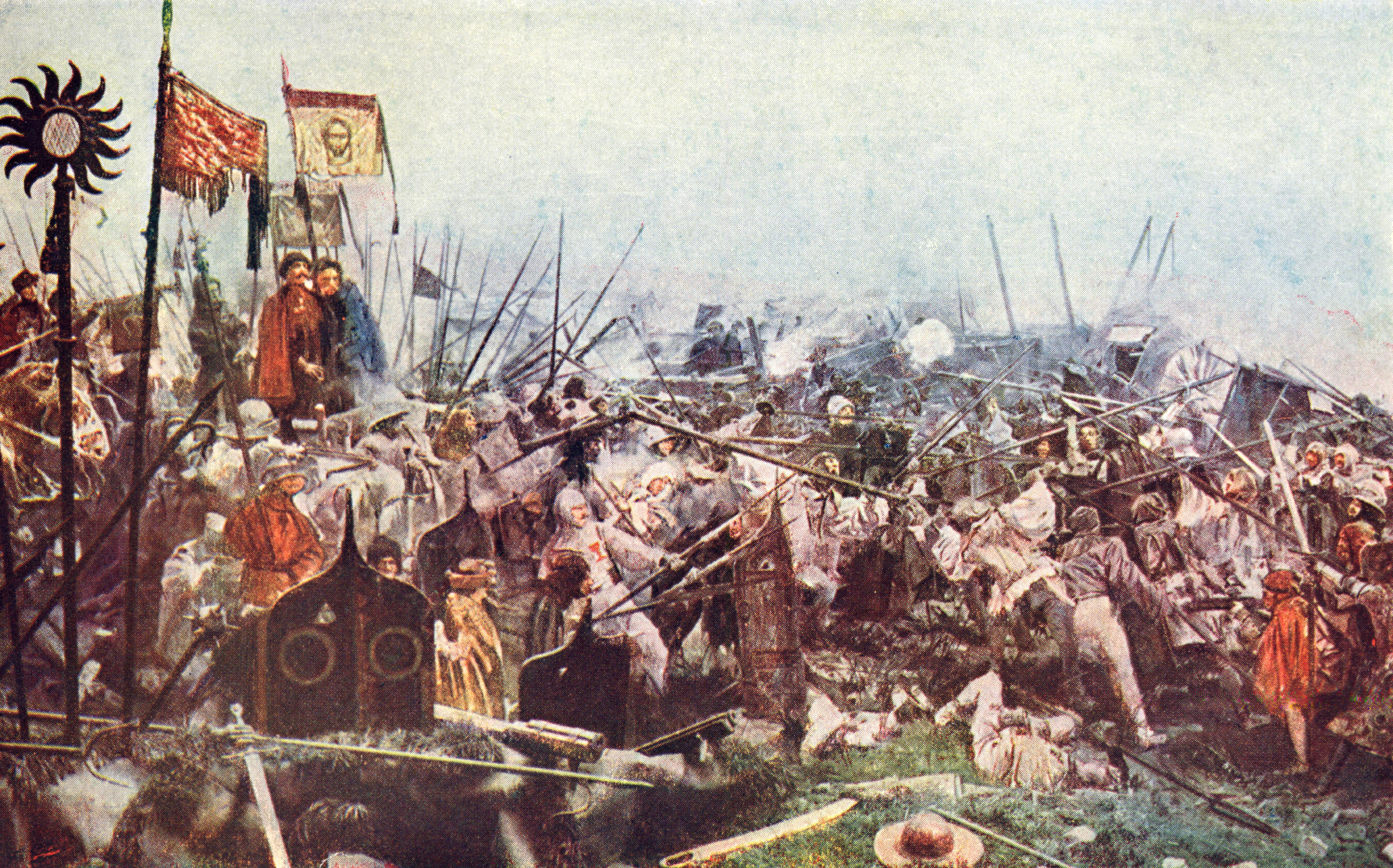
Date	30 May 1434
Location	Lipany near Český Brod
Result	Victory of moderate Hussites and Catholics

Belligerents
Radical Hussites: Taborites; Orphans	Moderate Hussites (Calixtines): Praguers; Hussite nobles; Bohemian Catholics: forces of Pilsen; forces of Pilsen's Landfrieden; forces of Karlštejn; Rosenberg's forces; city units of Prague and Mělník

Commanders and leaders
Prokop the Great †; Jan Čapek of Sány; Prokop the Lesser †; Jan Roháč of Dubá (POW)	Diviš Bořek of Miletínek; Oldřich II of Rosenberg

Strength
10,700	14,300

Casualties and losses
1,300 killed 700 executed	200 killed

The Battle of Lipany (Czech: Bitva u Lipan), also called the Battle of Český Brod, was fought at Lipany 40 km east of Prague on 30 May 1434 and virtually ended the Hussite Wars. An army of moderate Hussite (or Calixtine) nobility and Catholics, called the Bohemian League, defeated the radical Taborites and Orphans (or Sirotci) led by Prokop the Great, the overall commander, and by Jan Čapek of Sány, the cavalry commander.

== Battle ==
The radicals set up a Wagenburg on a strategically advantageous hill, and both armies stood opposite each other for some time. An attempt by the Calixtines/Utraquists to negotiate and peacefully resolve the conflict failed on account of the irreconcilable positions of the two sides. Three days after the unsuccessful negotiations, the Leaguers advanced to the radicals' encampment. Although the following mutual cannonade was harmless due to distance between the two armies, to the surprise of the radicals the Leaguers began to retreat with all their wagons.

Thinking that the enemy was fleeing, the radicals' commanders opened the Wagenburg to attack the Leaguers' formation, not knowing that the retreat was a trick to draw them out of the Wagenburg. As the radicals approached the Leaguers' army, the Leaguers stopped and began to fire from their wagons. At the same time, the Leaguers' heavy cavalry, which had been hidden near the radicals' camp, undertook a surprise attack from the side and penetrated into the open Wagenburg. The radicals' army quickly collapsed and the commander of the Orphans' cavalry, Čapek of Sány, fled with all his men to the nearby town of Kolín.

The battle now changed into a massacre of the lightly equipped radical forces. Both Prokop the Great and Prokop the Lesser were killed making a last stand at the wagons. Some prominent leaders of the radicals, including Jan Roháč of Dubá, were captured, but about 700 ordinary soldiers who surrendered after promises of renewed military service were burned to death in nearby barns.

== Aftermath ==
As a consequence of the battle, the Taborite army was markedly weakened, and the Orphans virtually ceased to exist as a military force. The road towards acceptance of the Compacts of Basel was now open, and it was signed on 5 July 1436 in Jihlava. The next month, Sigismund was accepted as King of Bohemia by all major factions. Sigismund commented on the Battle of Lipany that "the Bohemians could be overcome only by Bohemians."

The last formation of Taborites under the command of Jan Roháč of Dubé was besieged at his castle Sion near Kutná Hora. It was then captured by Sigismund's forces, and on 9 September 1437 Roháč, still refusing to accept Sigismund as his king, was hanged in Prague.

== See also ==
- Luděk Marold – Painter of the Marold's Panorama, which depicts this battle.
