= Battle of Malešov =

1424 battle of the Hussite Wars

Coordinates: 49°54′41″N 15°13′27″E

- Part of the Hussite Wars
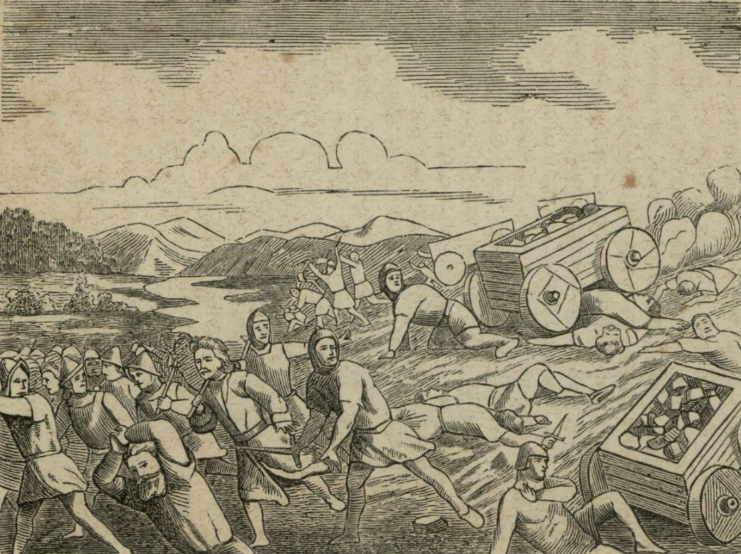
- Battle of Malešov on the 19th-century book illustration
| Date | 7 June 1424 |
| Location | Malešov |
| Result | Decisive Orebites victory |

Belligerents
| Orebites | Prague Hussites; Landfried of Pilsen; Bohemian Catholic nobility |

Commanders and leaders
| Jan Žižka; Jan Hvězda of Vícemilice | Diviš Bořek of Miletínek |

Strength
| 7,000 infantry 500 cavalry 300 war wagons few cannons and firearms | 7,000–10,000 infantry and cavalry some wagons and cannons |

Casualties and losses
| 200 killed or wounded | 1,200 killed or wounded |

The Battle of Malešov (Czech: Bitva u Malešova) was a battle of the Hussite Wars between the Orebites united armies under the command of Jan Žižka and the Prague Hussites with their Catholic allies that took place on 7 June 1424 near Malešov fortress, about 6 kilometres from Kutná Hora. The clash was won by Žižka's troops.

== Prelude ==
In 1423, an inner conflict broke out between the Hussite movement, defending itself from the attacks from the Catholic coalitions. Jan Žižka, key Hussite military and political leader, formed a new military alliance, so-called Orebits, which was based on four cities and towns (besides Hradec Králové also Jaroměř, Dvůr Králové and Čáslav) and a small stable field army. In mid-October 1423, the Prague Hussites who controlled the capital city of the Kingdom of Bohemia created their own union from representatives of the moderate Prague Hussites and Catholic nobility. Throughout the second half of 1423 and the first half of 1424, several battles took place between both Hussite alliances with varying success.

At the beginning of May 1424, Jan Žižka moved with his troops to the Plzeň region, defended by the alliance of the Catholic nobility, so-called Landfried of Pilsen (Plzeň). Here the Orebites were joined by a small detachment of Taborites led by Jan Hvězda of Vícemilice. Žižka's opponents were able to gather large forces, as Catholic troops from the Pilsen Landfried joined the Prague Hussites.

Under pressure from superior enemy forces, Žižka was forced to retreat. In Kostelec nad Labem he was surrounded by enemies. But Žižka deceived them and at night he unexpectedly withdrew his troops from Kostelec, crossed the Elbe river and held towards Stará Boleslav. From there he turned his army southeast, passed by Kolín and Kutná Hora and led his men to build a fortified camp near Malešov fortress.

== Battle ==
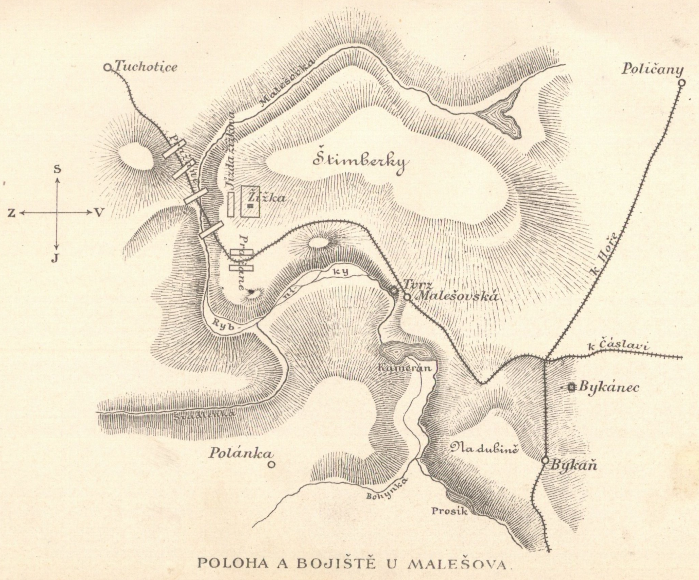
Late 19th-century map of the battlefield

Žižka's main tactical plan was to eliminate the enemy's numerical superiority, for this purpose he used the terrain advantage. His troops were located on a hill overlooking the road in the valley along which the joined Hussite-Catholic forces walked. In the center of his army, Žižka placed numerous carts filled with stones. About 300 other carts lined up on either side of the carts with stones, not in a typical defensive formation, but in such a way as to be able to advance. On both wings of Žižka's army there was cavalry with a total number of 500 soldiers, the infantry (about 7,000 soldiers) was located along with the carts.

The Praguers, who outnumbered the Orebites, began to prepare for the battle. Žižka waited until half of their army was lined up and moved forward. When this happened, he ordered his infantry to push carts with stones from above towards the enemy's center, and these actions were accompanied by cannon fire. The Praguers, thrown into confusion, were attacked by Žižka's cavalry, which led to defeat of their enemy.

The Hussite-Catholic army lost about 1,200-1,400 men, all their carts and cannons, while the Orebites lost only 200 casualties. In terms of human losses, the Battle of Malešov is one of the bloodiest battles of the entire Hussite war.

== Aftermath ==
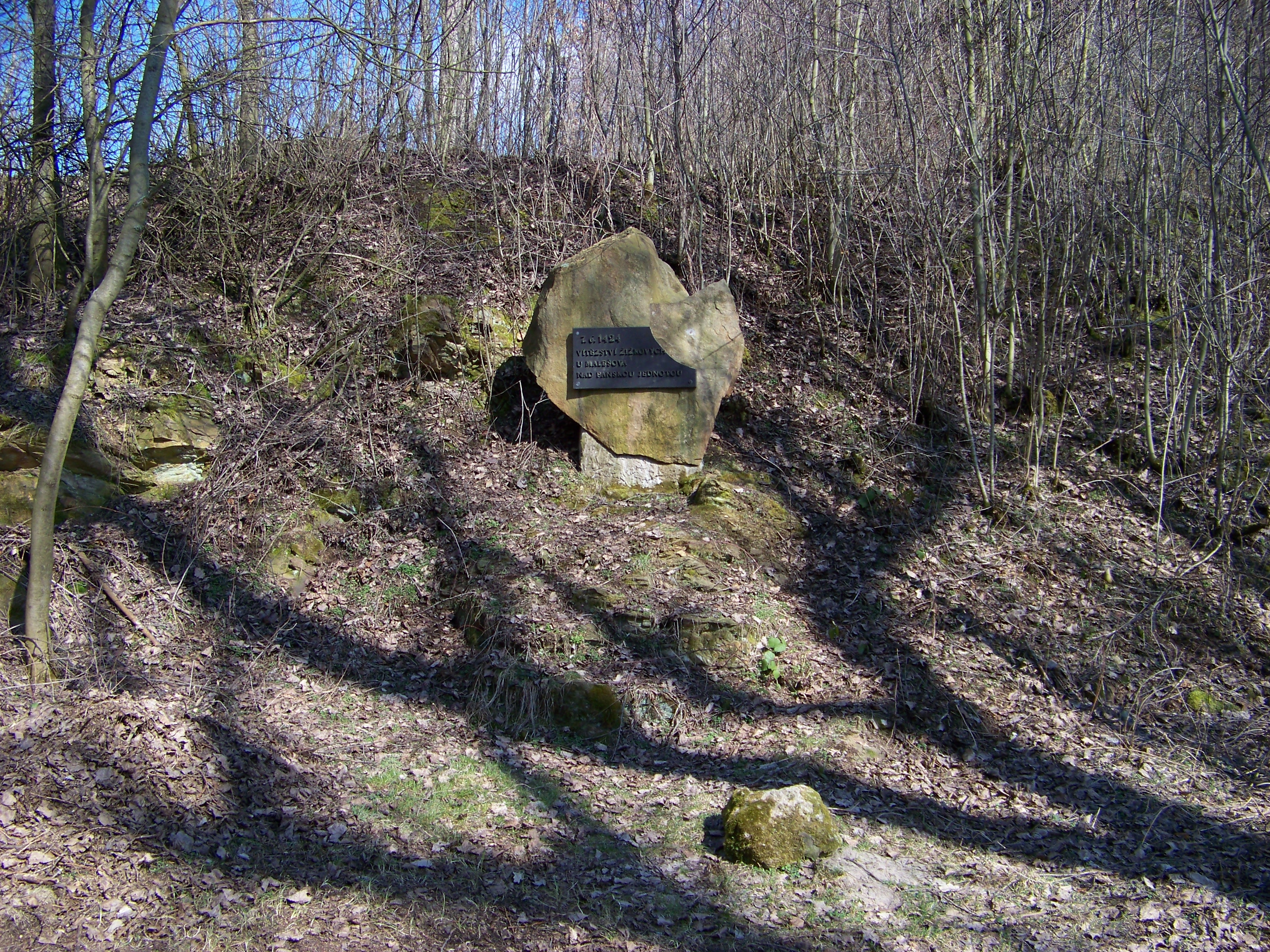
Memorial plaque on the site of the battle

The victory at Malešov strengthened Jan Žižka's leading position in the Hussite movement. In the following months, he turned a tactical victory into a strategic one. In September, he marched on Prague and on the 14th of that month, peace was concluded between the Hussite parties through the influence of John of Rokycany, afterwards Utraquist archbishop of Prague. It was agreed that the now reunited Hussites should attack Moravia, part of which was still held by Sigismund's partisans, and that Žižka should be the leader in this campaign.

However, Žižka died on the Bohemia-Moravian frontier near Přibyslav, during the siege of the town in Přibyslav in what is today Žižkovo Pole, on 11 October 1424 and since then the Hussite Wars entered to their new phase.

The clash is commemorated by the 20th-century build memorial stone with a plaque, placed on the site of the battle near the market town of Malešov.

== Sources ==
- Čornej, Petr. Velké dějiny zemí Koruny české V. 1402–1437. Prague: Paseka, 2000. ISBN 80-7185-296-1. (in Czech)
- Lenková, Jitka; Pavlík, Václav. Nejdůležitější bitvy v českých dějinách. 1st ed. Frýdek-Mistek: Alpress, 2007. ISBN 978-80-7362-470-5. (in Czech)
