= Miskovice =

- Municipality
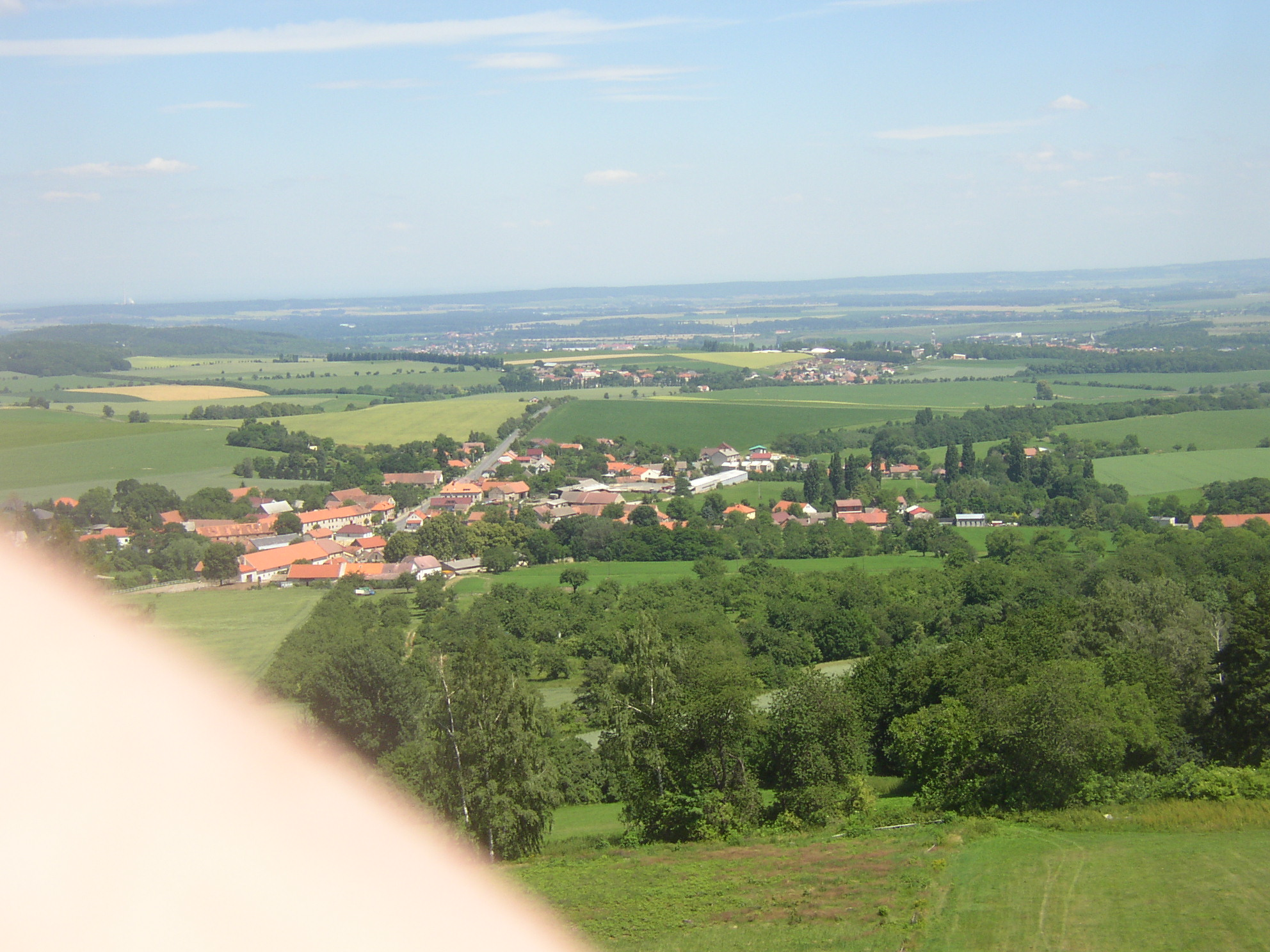
- View from the west

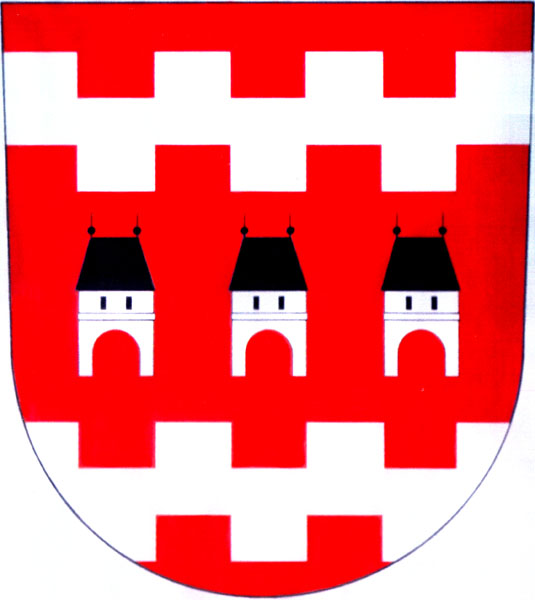
- Flag Coat of arms

- Location in the Czech Republic
- Coordinates: 49°56′46″N 15°12′17″E
- Country: Czech Republic
- Region: Central Bohemian
- District: Kutná Hora
- First mentioned: 1131

Area
  - Total: 19.21 km^{2} (7.42 sq mi)
- Elevation: 363 m (1,191 ft)

Population (2026-01-01)
  - Total: 1,165
  - Density: 60.65/km^{2} (157.1/sq mi)
- Time zone: UTC+1 (CET)
  - Summer (DST): UTC+2 (CEST)
- Postal codes: 284 01, 285 01
- Website: www.miskovice-kh.cz

Miskovice is a municipality and village in Kutná Hora District in the Central Bohemian Region of the Czech Republic. It has about 1,200 inhabitants.

== Administrative division ==
Miskovice consists of five municipal parts (in brackets population according to the 2021 census):

- Miskovice (403)
- Bylany (222)
- Hořany (83)
- Mezholezy (49)
- Přítoky (386)

== Etymology ==
The initial name of the village was Myslkovice. The name was derived from the personal name Myslek, meaning "the village of Myslek's people". In the 15th century, the name was distorted to Miskovice.

== Geography ==
Miskovice is located about 4 kilometres (2 mi) west of Kutná Hora and 48 km (30 mi) east of Prague. It lies in an agricultural landscape in the Upper Sázava Hills. The highest point is at 469 m (1,539 ft) above sea level. The Vrchlice Stream flows along the southern municipal border. Part of the Vrchlice Reservoir, built on the Vrchlice, is located within the territory of Miskovice.

== History ==
The first written mention of Miskovice is from 1131.

== Demographics ==
Historical population

Year	Pop.	±%
1869	1,424	—
1880	1,491	+4.7%
1890	1,520	+1.9%
1900	1,662	+9.3%
1910	1,606	−3.4%

Year	Pop.	±%
1921	1,587	−1.2%
1930	1,522	−4.1%
1950	998	−34.4%
1961	1,038	+4.0%
1970	882	−15.0%

Year	Pop.	±%
1980	767	−13.0%
1991	687	−10.4%
2001	761	+10.8%
2011	917	+20.5%
2021	1,143	+24.6%

Source: Censuses

== Transport ==
The I/2 road from Prague to Kutná Hora and Pardubice runs through the municipality.

== Sights ==
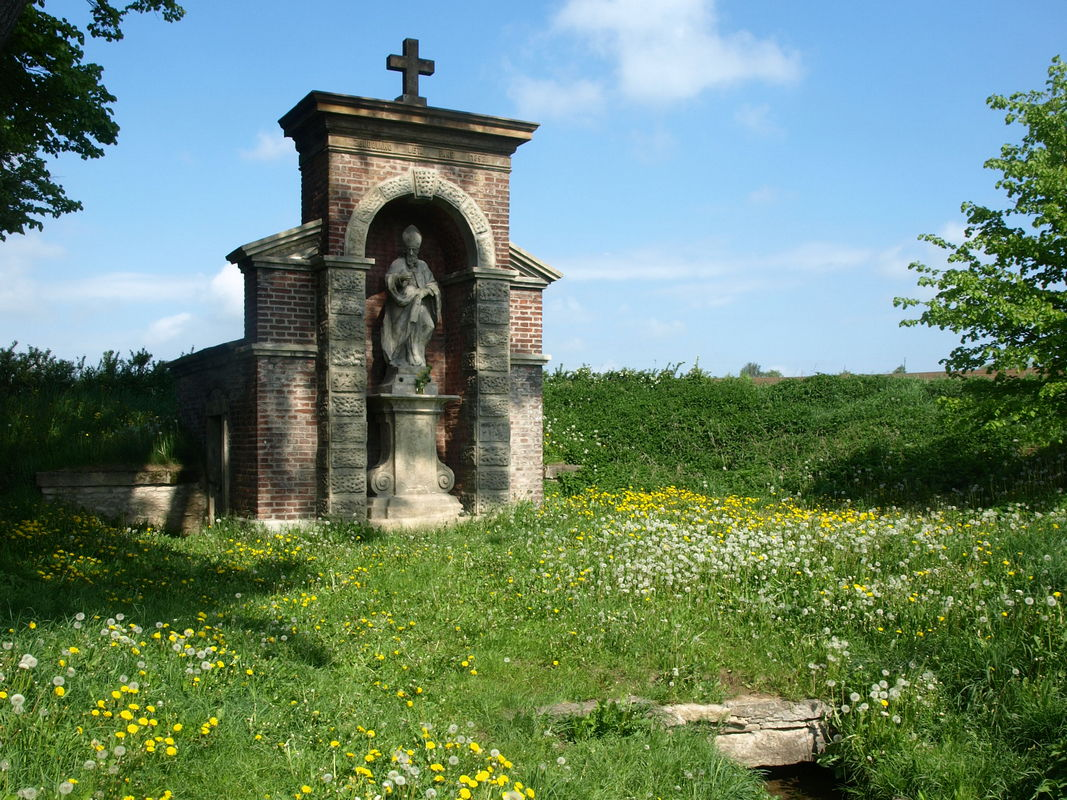
Chapel of Saint Adalbert

A notable building is the former Renaissance fortress in Přítoky. It dates from the end of the 16th century. Later it was rebuilt into a homestead, but many Renaissance elements have been preserved.

Near Bylany is the Spring of Saint Adalbert, which supplied Kutná Hora with drinking water in the Middle Ages. Above the spring stands the Chapel of Saint Adalbert from the end of the 19th century, decorated with a statue of St. Adalbert from the first half of the 18th century.

== Archaeology ==
In 2003, the first Czech fossil bones of a non-avian dinosaur were found in an abandoned quarry in the municipality. These belong to a small ornithopod related to the popular genus Iguanodon.

== Notable people ==
- Antonietta Brandeis (1848–1926), Czech-Italian painter
