= Vrchlice =

Stream in the Czech Republic

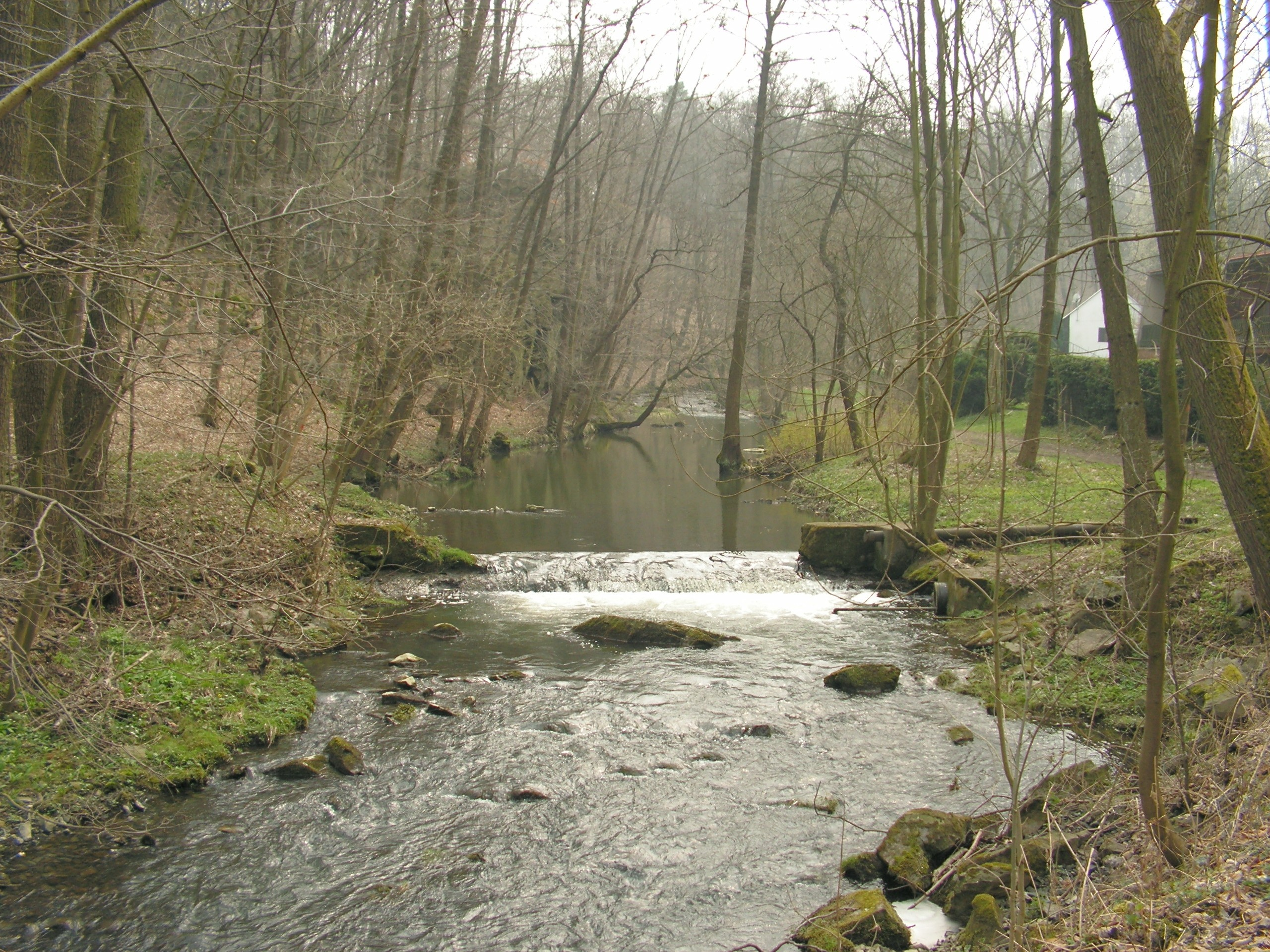
- The Vrchlice near Kutná Hora

Location
- Country: Czech Republic
- Region: Central Bohemian

Physical characteristics
- Source
  - location: Černíny, Upper Sázava Hills
  - coordinates: 49°49′16″N 15°13′33″E
  - elevation: 488 m (1,601 ft)
- Mouth
  - location: Klejnárka
  - coordinates: 49°58′16″N 15°19′11″E
  - elevation: 204 m (669 ft)
- Length: 30.0 km (18.6 mi)
- Basin size: 133.3 km^{2} (51.5 sq mi)
- Discharge
  - average: 0.53 m^{3}/s (19 cu ft/s) near estuary

Basin features
- Progression: Klejnárka→ Elbe→ North Sea

The Vrchlice is a stream in the Czech Republic, a left tributary of the Klejnárka River. It flows through the Central Bohemian Region. It is 30.0 km (18.6 mi) long.

== Etymology ==
The initial name of the stream was Vysplice. The German miners then began to call the stream Bach (literally 'stream' in German), from which the Czech name Pách developed. In 1824, the stream was renamed Vrchlice, which was derived from its oldest name, Vysplice.

== Characteristic ==
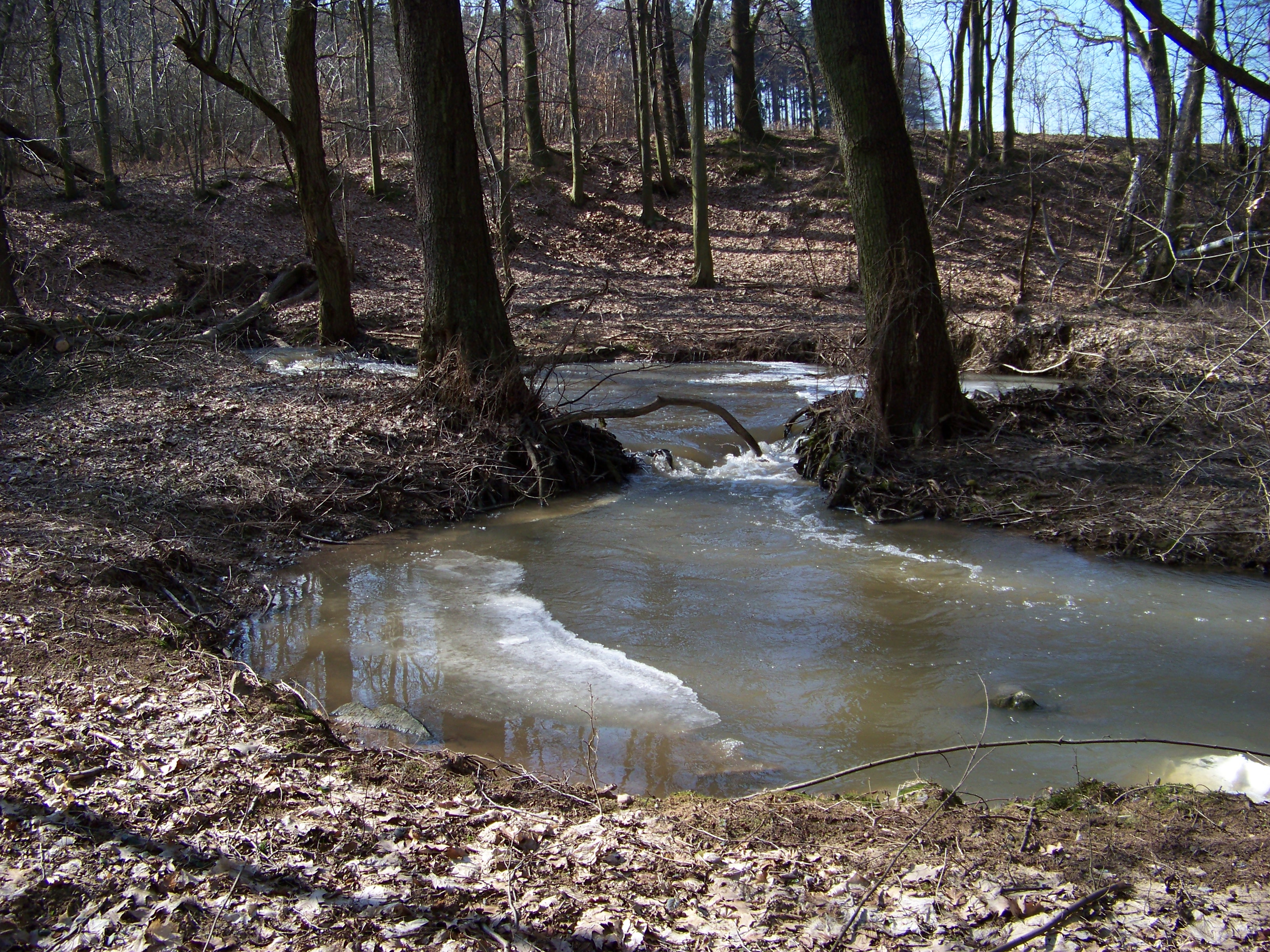
The Vrchlice near Chlístovice

The Vrchlice originates in the Zdeslavice exclave of the Černíny municipality in the Upper Sázava Hills at an elevation of 488 m (1,601 ft) and flows to Nové Dvory, where it enters the Vrchlice River at an elevation of 204 m (669 ft). It is 30.0 km (18.6 mi) long. Its drainage basin has an area of 133.3 km^{2} (51.5 sq mi).

The longest tributaries of the Vrchlice are:

Tributary	Length (km)	River km	Side
Opatovický potok	14.8	16.9	right
Chlístovický potok	9.0	20.0	left

== Course ==
The most populated settlement on the stream is the town of Kutná Hora. The stream flows through the municipal territories of Černíny, Štipoklasy, Chlístovice, Malešov, Vidice, Miskovice, Kutná Hora and Nové Dvory.

== Bodies of water ==
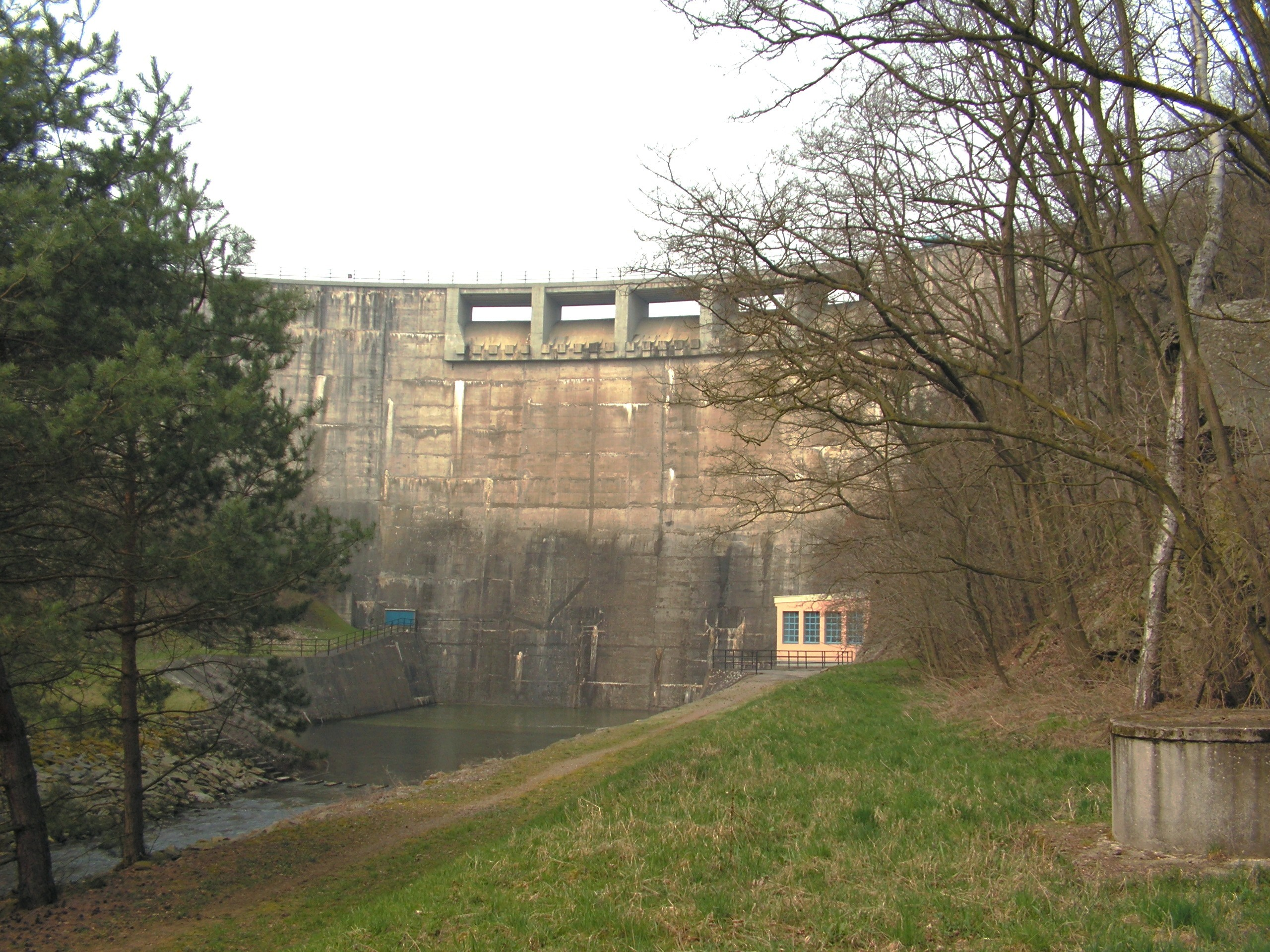
Dam of the Vrchlice Reservoir

The Vrchlice Reservoir was built on the middle course of the stream in 1966–1970. It has an area of 93.5 ha (231 acres). The main purpose of the reservoir is the accumulation of water for drinking water supply. Other purposes are provision of minimum flow under the dam, the energy use of water outflow from the reservoir and contribution to flood protection. The dam of the reservoir is the only arch dam in the Czech Republic. In addition to the reservoir, there are many fishponds on the stream.

== Nature ==
The most valuable part of the Vrchlice basin is the Vrchlice valley in Kutná Hora, which was proposed to be declared a nature reserve. According to a 2009 study, three species of bivalves occur in the stream in this area: Galba truncatula, Ancylus fluviatilis and Sphaerium corneum.

== In culture ==
Jaroslav Vrchlický (a famous Czech writer, eight times nominated for the Nobel Prize in Literature) chose his pseudonym after the Vrchlice valley, which he liked very much. In his memory, the Vrchlický relief is carved in the rock in the Vrchlice valley.

== See also ==
- List of rivers of the Czech Republic
