= Vitice =

- Municipality
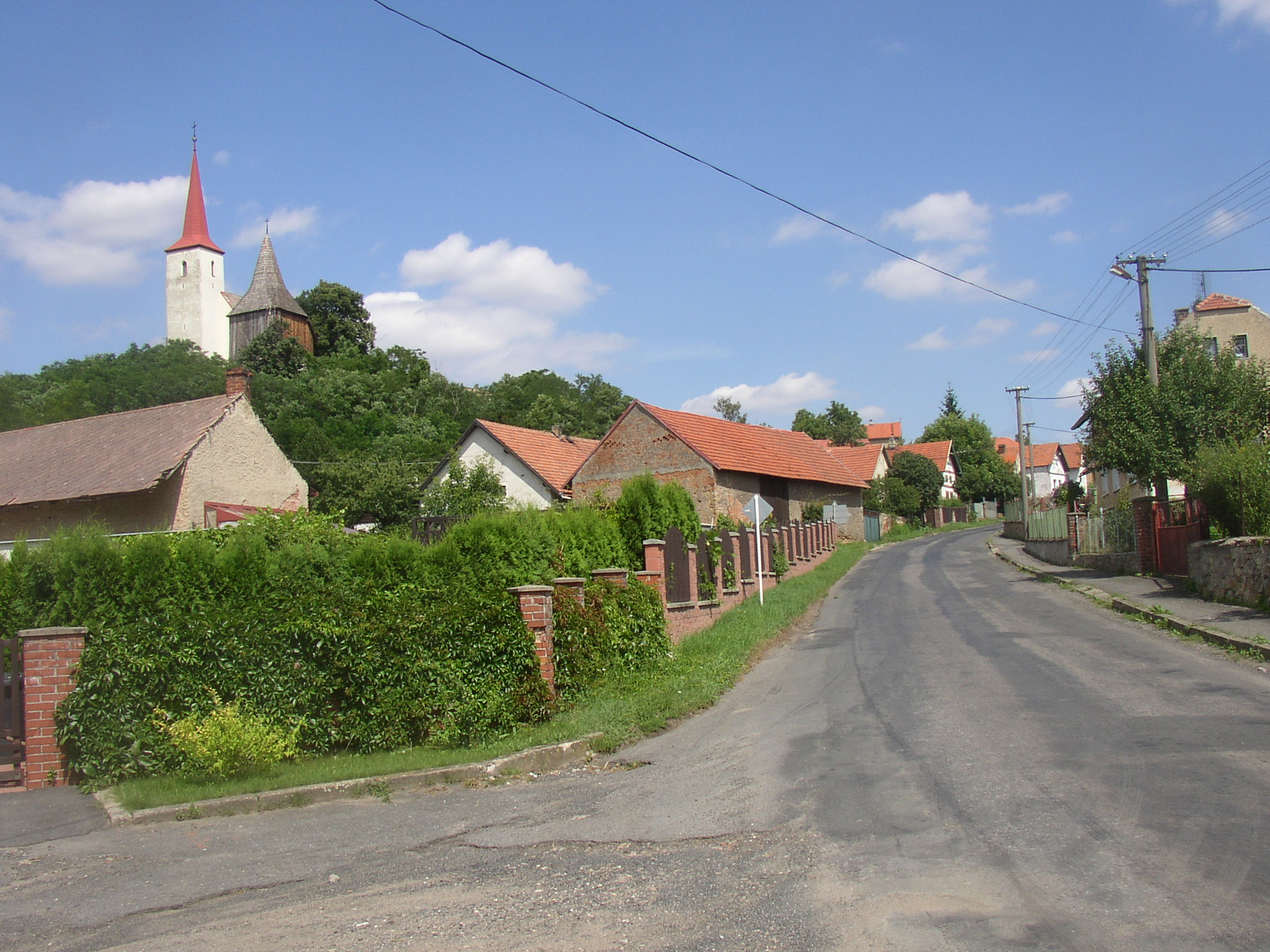
- View from the southwest

- Location in the Czech Republic
- Coordinates: 50°1′52″N 14°54′52″E
- Country: Czech Republic
- Region: Central Bohemian
- District: Kolín
- First mentioned: 1352

Area
  - Total: 22.41 km^{2} (8.65 sq mi)
- Elevation: 295 m (968 ft)

Population (2026-01-01)
  - Total: 1,191
  - Density: 53.15/km^{2} (137.6/sq mi)
- Time zone: UTC+1 (CET)
  - Summer (DST): UTC+2 (CEST)
- Postal codes: 281 06, 281 63
- Website: www.vitice.cz

Vitice is a municipality and village in Kolín District in the Central Bohemian Region of the Czech Republic. It has about 1,200 inhabitants.

== Administrative division ==
Vitice consists of six municipal parts (in brackets population according to the 2021 census):

- Vitice (241)
- Chotýš (165)
- Dobré Pole (368)
- Hřiby (196)
- Lipany (107)
- Močedník (31)

== Etymology ==
The name Vitice is derived from the personal name Vít, meaning "the village of Vít's people".

== Geography ==
Vitice is located about 20 kilometres (12 mi) west of Kolín and 28 km (17 mi) east of Prague. It lies on the border between the Central Elbe Table and Benešov Uplands. The highest point at 407 m (1,335 ft) above sea level.

== History ==
The first written mention of Vitice is from 1352. In 1632, the village was annexed to the Černý Kostelec estate and shared its owners since then.

The Battle of Lipany, which was the last battle of the Hussite Wars, took place in the area of the municipality on 30 May 1434. It is named after the village of Lipany, but it took place in a wider area.

== Demographics ==
Historical population

Year	Pop.	±%
1869	1,755	—
1880	1,850	+5.4%
1890	1,951	+5.5%
1900	1,960	+0.5%
1910	1,890	−3.6%

Year	Pop.	±%
1921	1,748	−7.5%
1930	1,689	−3.4%
1950	1,136	−32.7%
1961	1,120	−1.4%
1970	1,034	−7.7%

Year	Pop.	±%
1980	1,007	−2.6%
1991	943	−6.4%
2001	942	−0.1%
2011	997	+5.8%
2021	1,108	+11.1%

Source: Censuses

== Transport ==
The I/12 road from Prague to Kolín runs along the northern municipal border.

== Sights ==
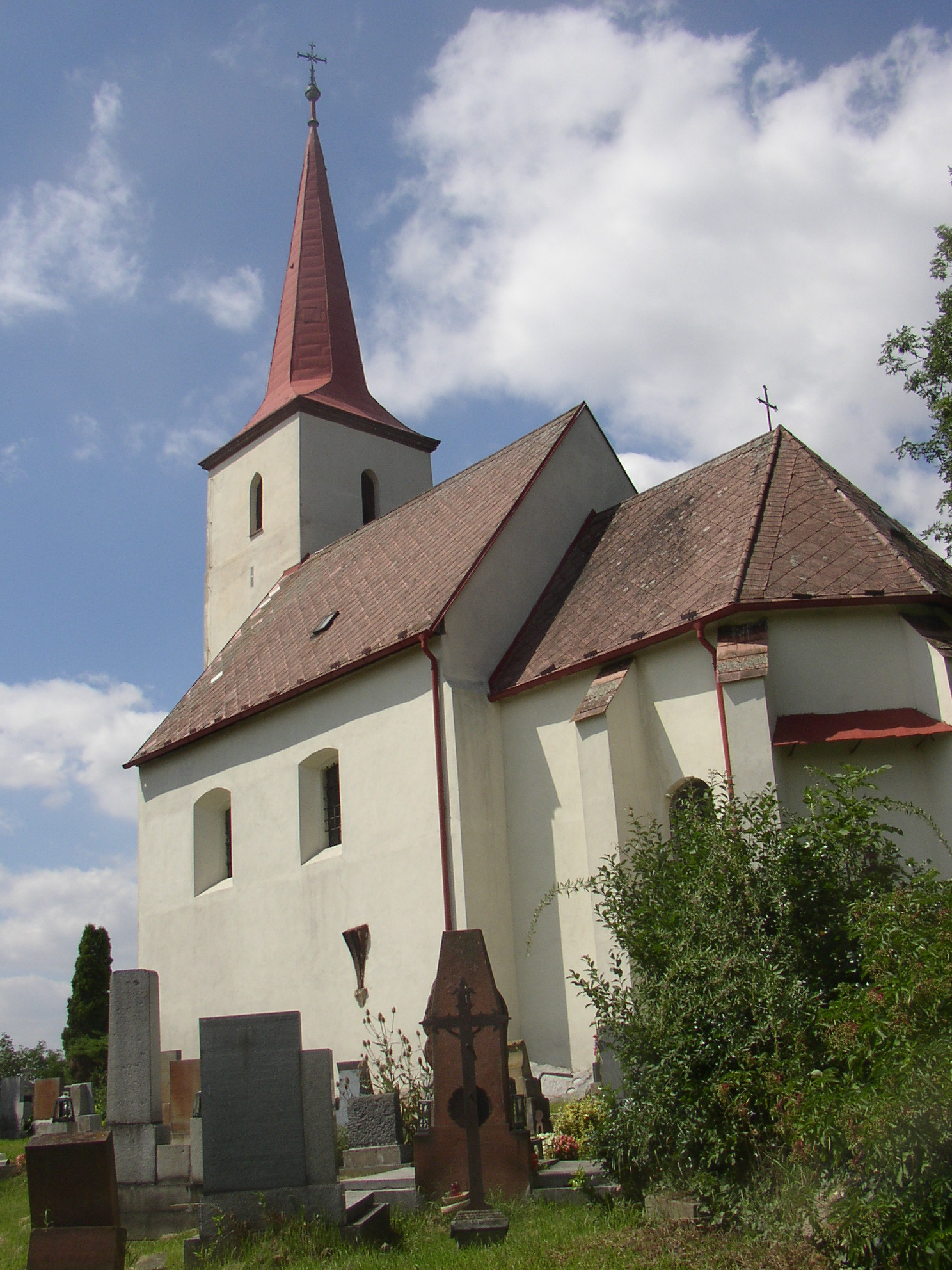
Church of Saints Simon and Jude

The main landmark of Vitice is the Church of Saints Simon and Jude. It was built in the Gothic style in the 13th century. It is a valuable cemetery church. Next to the church is a separate wooden bell tower.

The Battle of Lipany is commemorated by a memorial that was raised on a hill called Lipská hora.
