= Sion Castle =

Castle

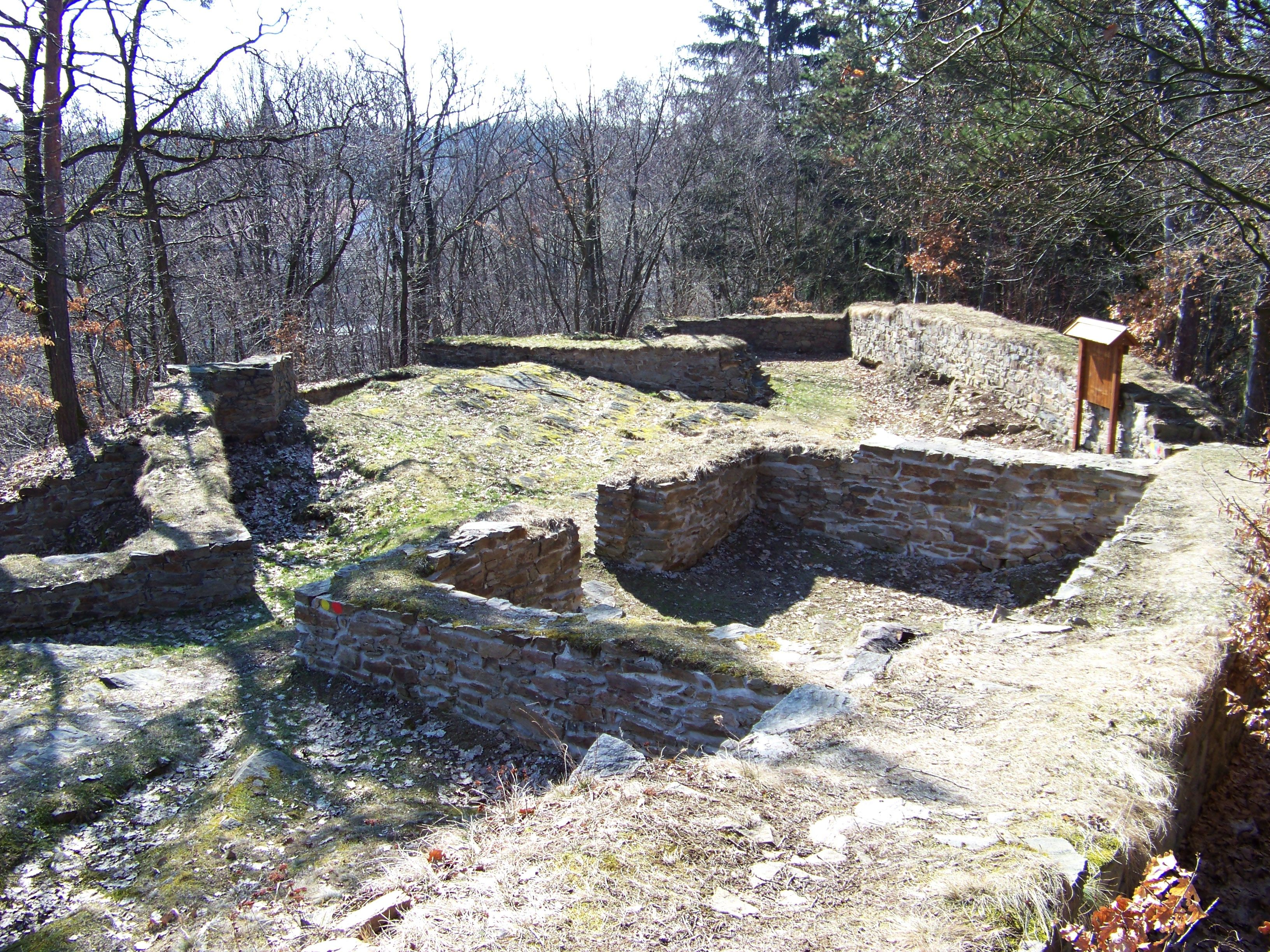
- The ruins of Sion Castle in 2013

Site information
- Type: Castle
- Condition: Ruined

Location
- Coordinates: 49°53′20″N 15°12′38″E

Site history
- Built: 1420s or 1430s
- Built by: Jan Roháč of Dubá
- Demolished: 1437
- Battles/wars: Siege of Sion Castle

Sion is a castle ruin in Chlístovice in the Central Bohemian Region of the Czech Republic. It lies near Kutná Hora. It was established in the 15th century by Jan Roháč of Dubá. Sion Castle was used for a short time before it was besieged and subsequently destroyed. The site was investigated by archaeologists in the 20th century. Today, only scattered parts of the basement stone walls with some arches and stairs remain of the original castle.

== History ==
Sion Castle was founded at some point between 1424 and 1436 by Hussite Jan Roháč of Dubá. Most documentary sources detailing the castle focus on its demise in 1437. By 1437, Sion was one of the last footholds of opposition to the rule of Sigismund, Holy Roman Emperor. In April that year, Hynce Ptáček of Pirkštejn led an army to the castle and began besieging it. The garrison resisted for several months until reinforcements for Ptáček arrived under Michal Országh's command. The castle was captured on 6 September and demolished (slighted) soon after. There are traces of siege works near the castle.

Amateur investigations were carried out at Sion Castle in 1937, uncovering human remains thought to be of the castle's defenders and some artefacts which have since been lost. In the view of archaeologist Eva Jánská, the digging contributed little to the understanding of the site while damaging the remains. The castle was designated a cultural monument in 1958. The Military History Institute began excavating the castle in 1961, marking the beginning of a planned seven-year project.

== Location and layout ==
Sion Castle was built in a bend of the river Vrchlice, using it to surround three sides of the site with access from the east.
