= Černíny =

- Municipality
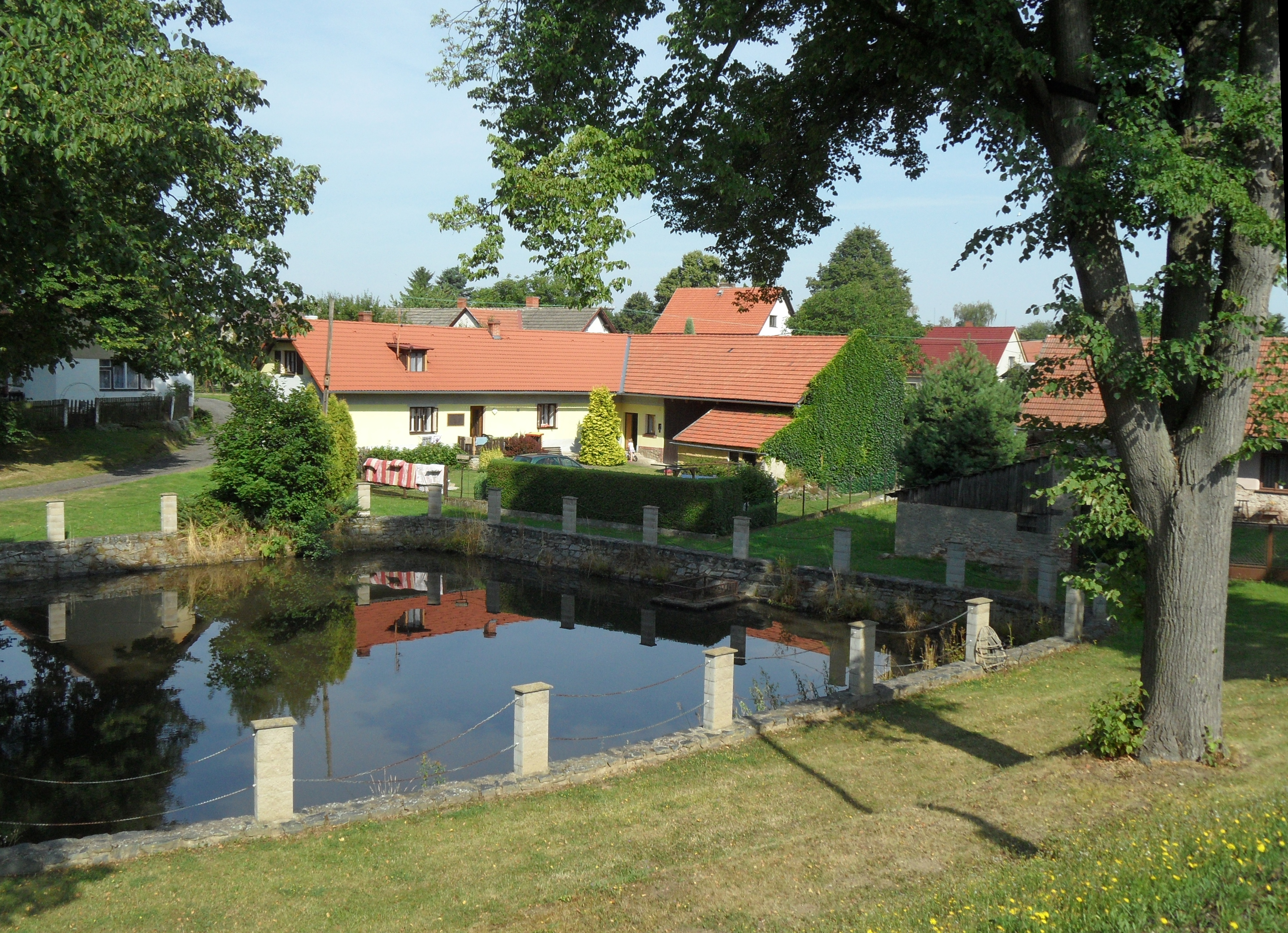
- Pond in the centre of Černíny

- Location in the Czech Republic
- Coordinates: 49°50′24″N 15°13′8″E
- Country: Czech Republic
- Region: Central Bohemian
- District: Kutná Hora
- First mentioned: 1327

Area
  - Total: 16.12 km^{2} (6.22 sq mi)
- Elevation: 446 m (1,463 ft)

Population (2026-01-01)
  - Total: 444
  - Density: 27.5/km^{2} (71.3/sq mi)
- Time zone: UTC+1 (CET)
  - Summer (DST): UTC+2 (CEST)
- Postal codes: 284 01, 286 01
- Website: www.cerniny.cz

Černíny is a municipality and village in Kutná Hora District in the Central Bohemian Region of the Czech Republic. It has about 400 inhabitants.

== Administrative division ==
Černíny consists of six municipal parts (in brackets population according to the 2021 census):

- Černíny (142)
- Bahno (96)
- Hetlín (61)
- Krasoňovice (22)
- Předbořice (47)
- Zdeslavice (27)

Zdeslavice forms an exclave of the municipal territory.

== Demographics ==
Historical population
Year	Pop.	±%
1869	1,165	—
1880	1,145	−1.7%
1890	1,097	−4.2%
1900	986	−10.1%
1910	988	+0.2%
1921	1,009	+2.1%
1930	919	−8.9%
1950	713	−22.4%
1961	734	+2.9%
1970	593	−19.2%
1980	527	−11.1%
1991	437	−17.1%
2001	400	−8.5%
2011	370	−7.5%
2021	395	+6.8%
Source: Censuses
