= Postupice =

- Municipality
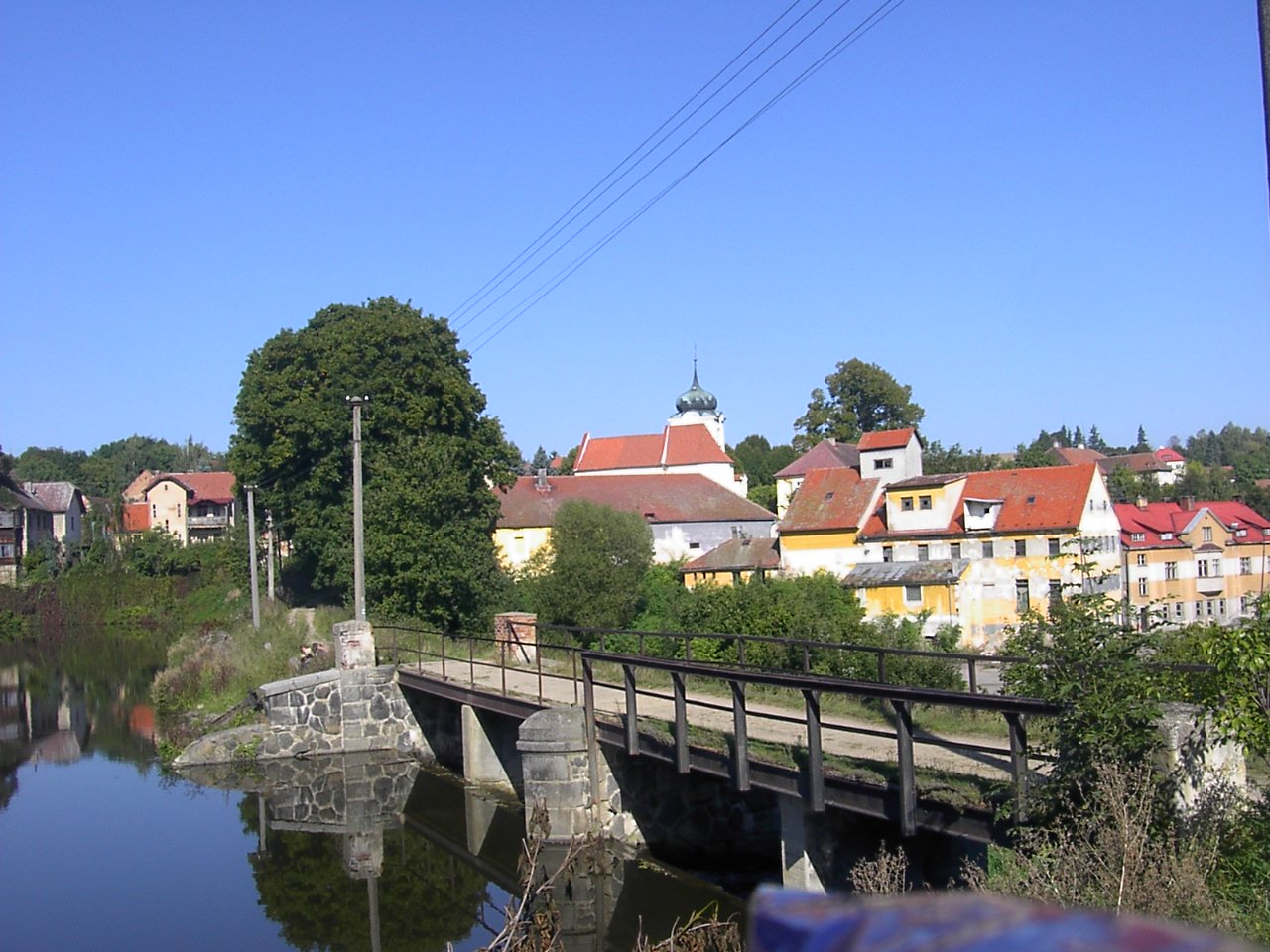
- General view of Postupice

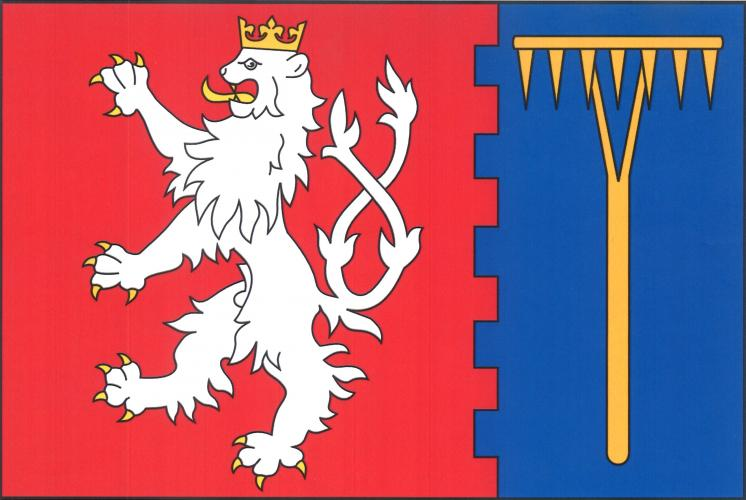
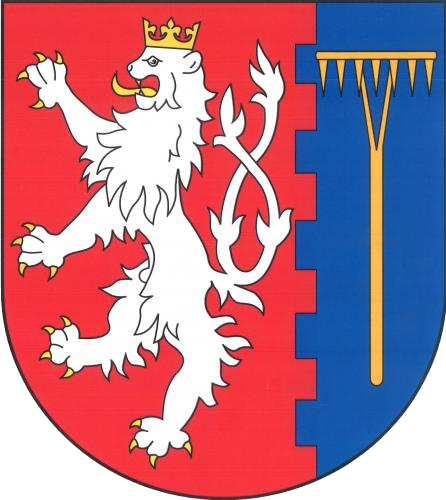
- Flag Coat of arms

- Location in the Czech Republic
- Coordinates: 49°43′41″N 14°46′38″E
- Country: Czech Republic
- Region: Central Bohemian
- District: Benešov
- First mentioned: 1205

Area
  - Total: 40.01 km^{2} (15.45 sq mi)
- Elevation: 416 m (1,365 ft)

Population (2026-01-01)
  - Total: 1,446
  - Density: 36.14/km^{2} (93.60/sq mi)
- Time zone: UTC+1 (CET)
  - Summer (DST): UTC+2 (CEST)
- Postal code: 257 01
- Website: www.chopos.cz/postupice-titulni-strana.html

Postupice is a municipality and village in Benešov District in the Central Bohemian Region of the Czech Republic. It has about 1,400 inhabitants.

== Administrative division ==
Postupice consists of 16 municipal parts (in brackets population according to the 2021 census):

- Postupice (648)
- Buchov (27)
- Čelivo (52)
- Dobříčkov (126)
- Holčovice (25)
- Jemniště (85)
- Lhota Veselka (82)
- Lísek (120)
- Milovanice (76)
- Miroslav (42)
- Mokliny (3)
- Nová Ves (101)
- Pozov (49)
- Roubíčkova Lhota (18)
- Sušice (1)
- Vrbětín (6)

== Etymology ==
The name is derived from the personal name Postupa, meaning "the village of Postupa's people".

== Geography ==
Postupice is located about 7 kilometres (4 mi) southeast of Benešov and 40 km (25 mi) southeast of Prague. The large municipal territory lies mostly in the Benešov Uplands, but the southeastern part extends into the Vlašim Uplands. The highest point is the hill Věž at 574 m (1,883 ft) above sea level. The territory is rich in fishponds, fed by the Chotýšanka and other small watercourses.

== History ==
The first written mention of Postupice is in a deed of King Ottokar I from 1205, where he confirmed the ownership of the village by the Ostrov Monastery in Davle.

== Demographics ==
Historical population

Year	Pop.	±%
1869	2,775	—
1880	2,821	+1.7%
1890	2,650	−6.1%
1900	2,588	−2.3%
1910	2,564	−0.9%

Year	Pop.	±%
1921	2,444	−4.7%
1930	2,203	−9.9%
1950	1,720	−21.9%
1961	1,670	−2.9%
1970	1,489	−10.8%

Year	Pop.	±%
1980	1,253	−15.8%
1991	1,147	−8.5%
2001	1,125	−1.9%
2011	1,200	+6.7%
2021	1,461	+21.8%

Source: Censuses

== Transport ==
Postupice is located on the railway line Benešov–Vlašim.

== Sights ==
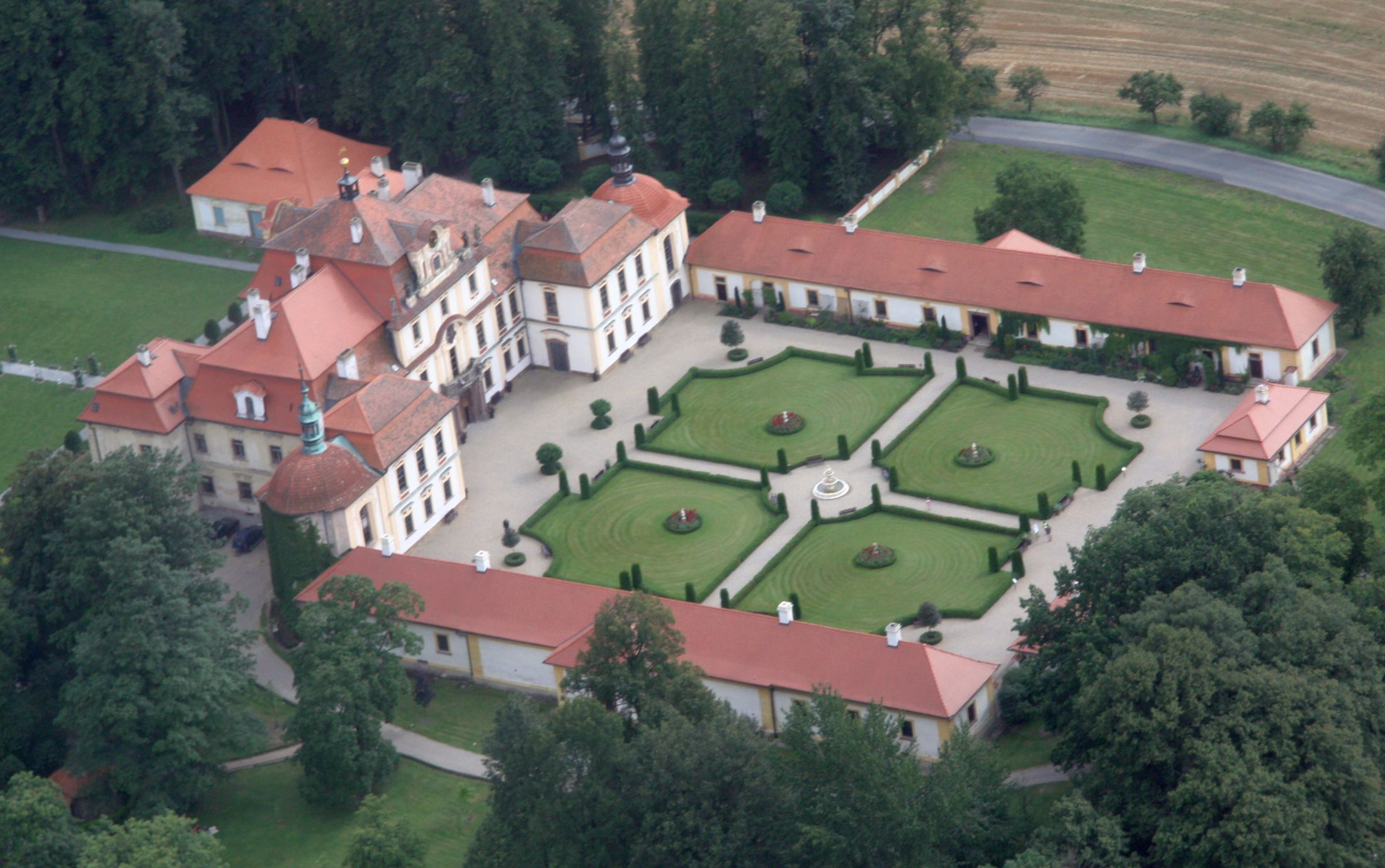
Jemniště Castle

The village of Jemniště is known for the Jemniště Castle. It is a Baroque residence built by František Maxmilián Kaňka in 1724–1725 for Count Frances Adam of Trauttmansdorff. At the turn of the 18th and 19th centuries, the French-style garden was remodelled into an English-style park. In 1868, the residence was bought by the Sternberg family. It was returned to their ownership in 1995. Part of the castle is open to the public and offers sightseeing tours.

== Notable people ==
- Svatopluk Čech (1846–1908), writer; attended local school
- Miroslav Januš (born 1972), sport shooter
