= Jan Roháč of Dubá =

Bohemian general

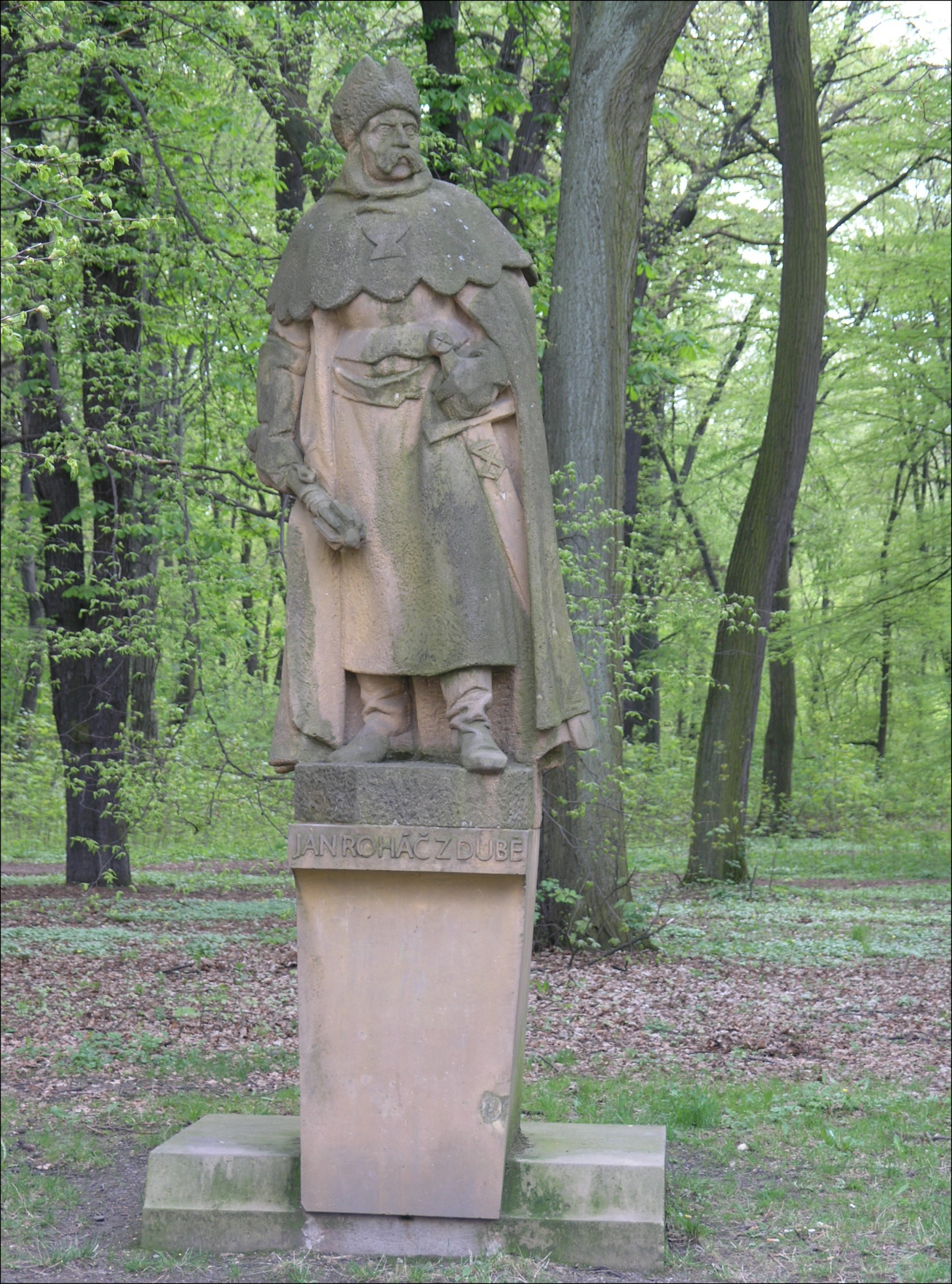
Statue of Jan Roháč at Hvězda Park in Prague

Jan Roháč of Dubá (Czech: Jan Roháč z Dubé; died 9 September 1437) was a Bohemian Hussite general who originated in the Bohemian gentry.

== Life ==
Following the death of Jan Žižka, he became Master of Orphans, a radical Hussite sect. He survived the Battle of Lipany in 1434 and, in 1437, he retreated with his last remaining disciples to his Sion Castle in what is now the Czech Republic. There he was besieged and after four months the castle defenses were successfully breached by the combined efforts of Bohemian troops under Hynek Ptáček and Hungarian troops led by Michael Ország. Roháč was hanged on Emperor Sigismund's order three days later in Prague, alongside the survivors of his garrison. His death marked the end of involvement of the radical Hussites in public affairs in Bohemia.
