= Prague Hussites =

Moderate Hussite faction

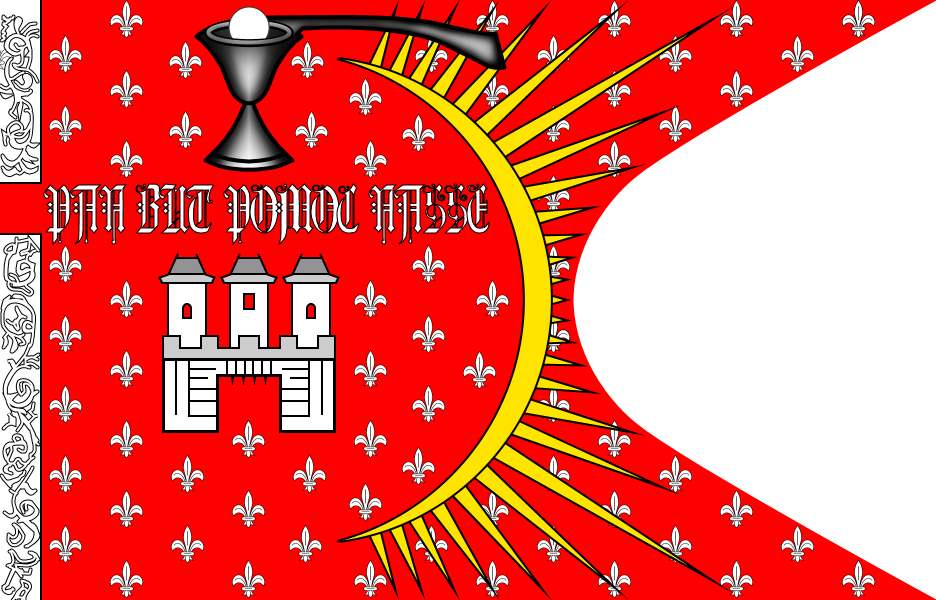
The "Prague Banner". During the Hussite Wars the city militia fought under this banner. Later banner was captured by Swedish troops in 1649 and placed in the Royal Military Museum in Stockholm

The Prague Hussites, Prague Union (Czech: Pražský svaz) or simply "Praguers" (Czech: Pražané) was a faction of Moderate Hussites based in Prague, the capital of the Kingdom of Bohemia.

In September 1420, the first year of the Hussite Wars, the Prague Hussites, led by Hynek Krušina of Lichtenburg, besieged Vyšehrad castle, which was held by Czech and German Imperial knights. They established a military camp on a nearby hill and engaged in artillery duels with the Vyšehrad garrison. Imperial troops from nearby Hradčany Castle fired into the Old Town of Prague in support of the besieged Vyšehrad garrison. The Prague Hussites sent out a call for aid, which resulted in thousands of Hussite reinforcements coming from Hradec Králové, Louny, and Žatec. However, Tábor, the home of the Taborites, a Radical Hussite faction, only sent forty horsemen. The Prague Hussites then completely surrounded the castle except for the cliffside by the river, which forced the garrison to agree to surrender if their lack of supplies persisted and Emperor Sigismund did not arrive to relieve them by 09:00 on 31 October.

Sigismund arrived at noon on 31 October and found that the castle had already surrendered. He initiated the Battle of Vyšehrad, in which his forces were defeated. Radical Hussite priests called for the Imperial corpses to rot on the field for three days, but the army of the Prague Hussites ignored it. The castle was sacked and on 21 June 1421; Hradcany Castle was also taken by the Prague Hussites and similarly ransacked.

The Prague Hussites included primarily Bohemian nobility and merchants as opposed to the Taborites and Orebites, who included many peasants and lower-class clergy. During the Hussite Wars, Prague Hussites tried to unite Hussite groups and reestablish the Christian church in Bohemia, but this effort was hindered by the Taborites who gained control of communities in southern Bohemia.
