= Matěj Rejsek =

Czech stonemason, sculptor, builder and architect

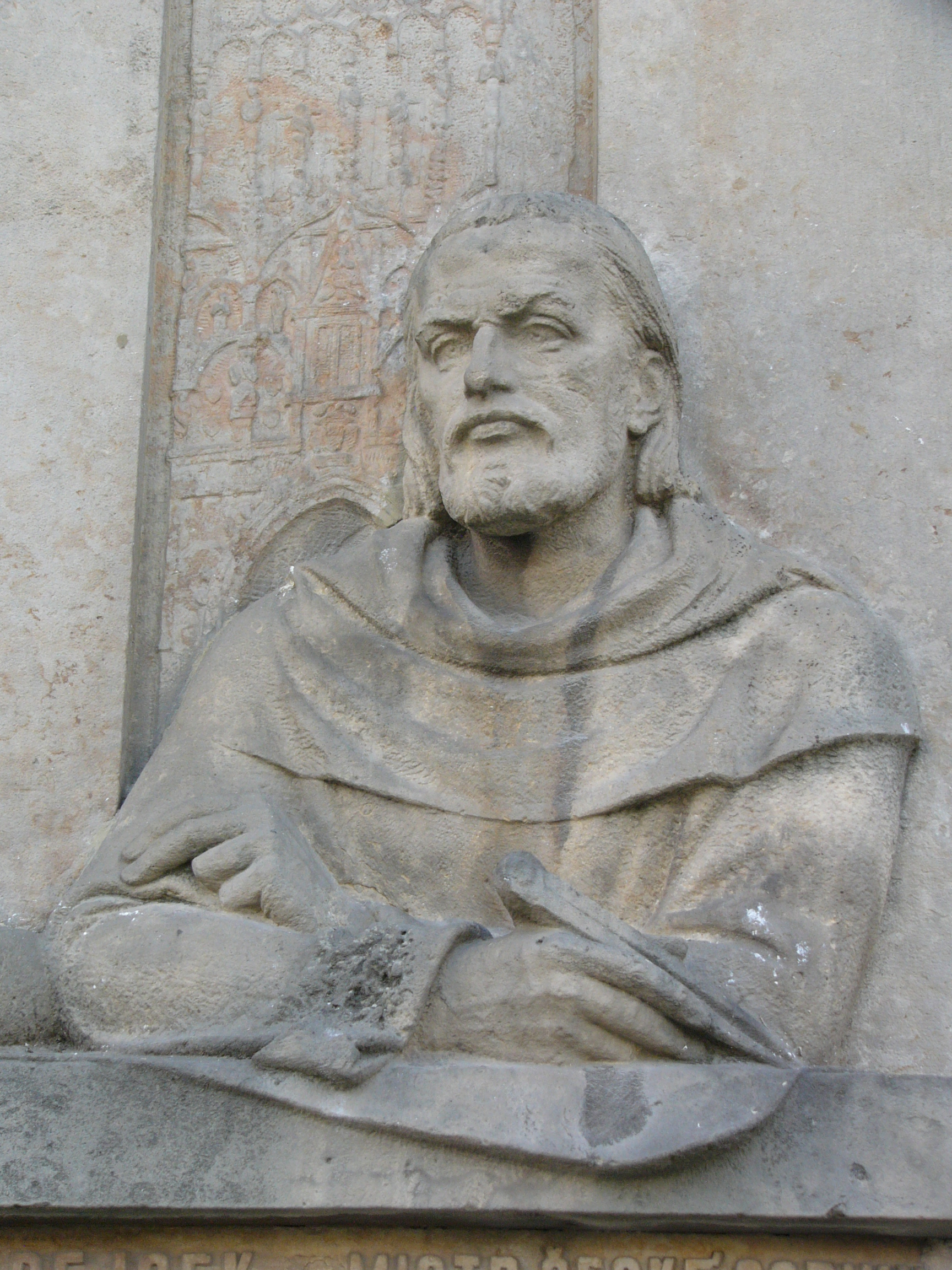
- Memorial plaque of Matěj Rejsek at city hall in Prostějov
- Born: c. 1445; Prostějov, Moravia, Bohemia
- Died: 1 July 1506; Kutná Hora, Bohemia
- Known for: Architecture, sculpture
- Notable work: Powder Tower in Prague, St. Barbara's Church in Kutná Hora
- Movement: Gothic style (Jagiellonian late Gothic)

Matěj Rejsek or Matyáš Rejsek (German: Matthias Rejsek; c. 1445 – 1 July 1506) was a Czech stonemason, sculptor, builder and architect of the late Gothic style.

== Life ==
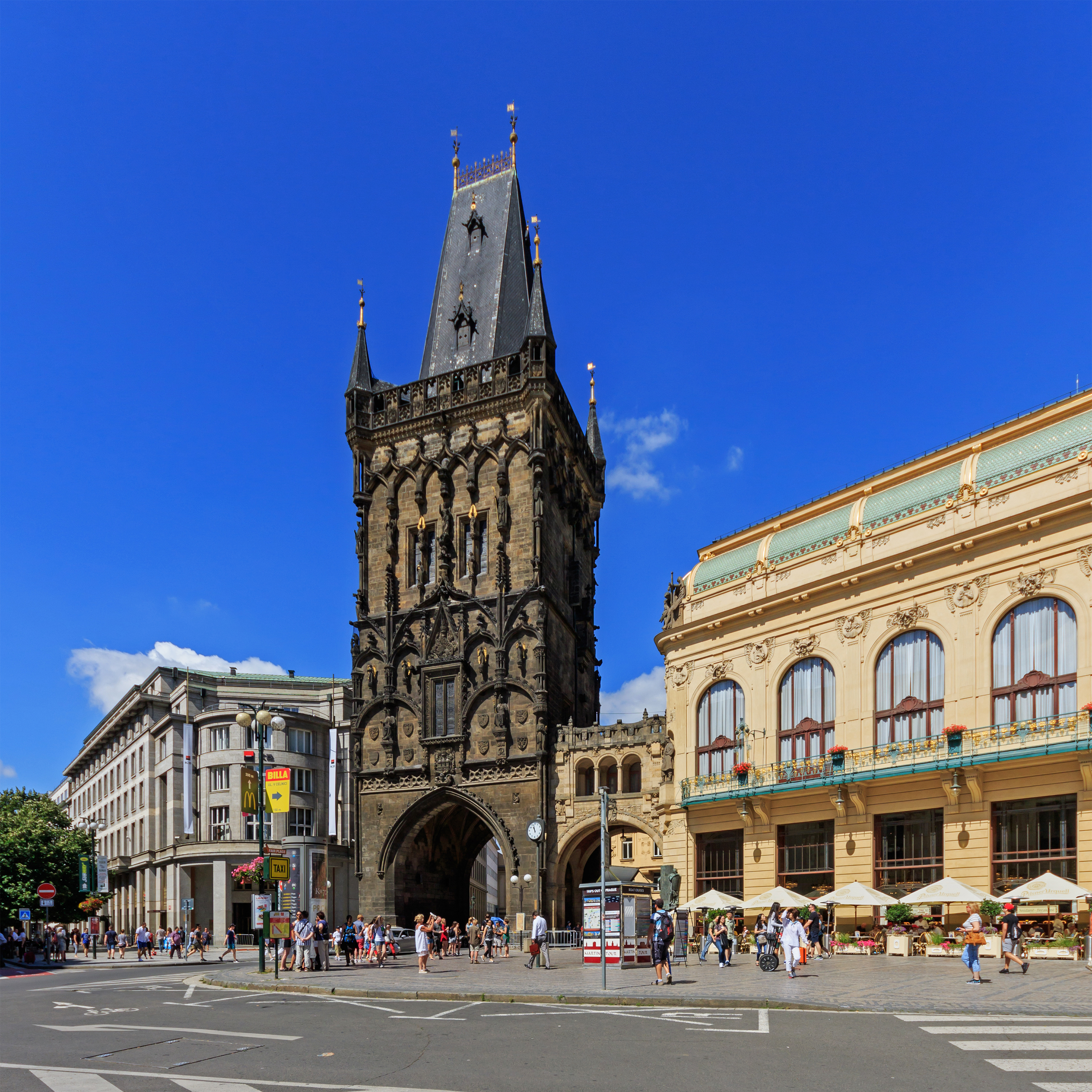
Powder Tower in Prague

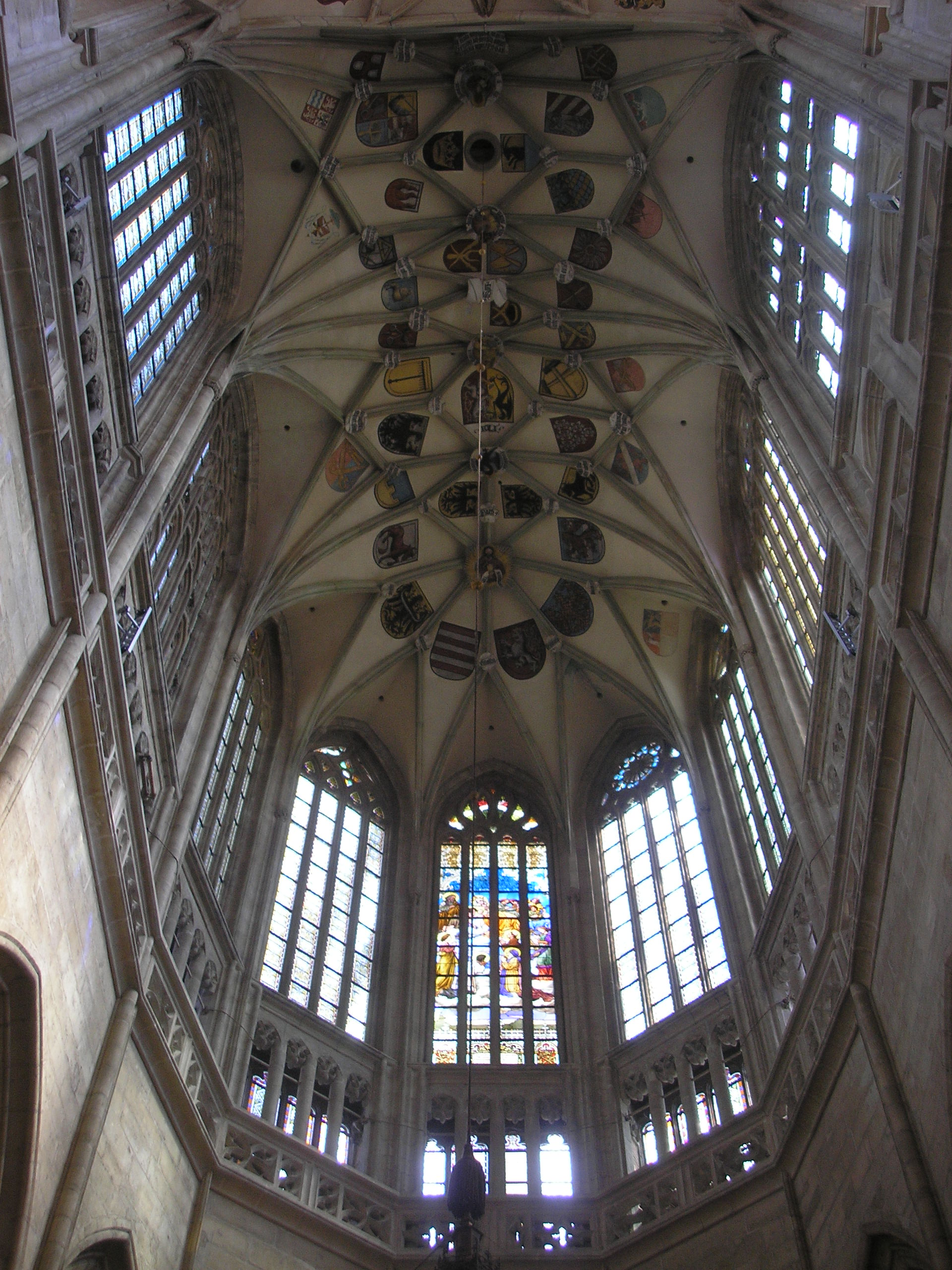
Presbytery of St. Barbara's Church in Kutná Hora from 1499

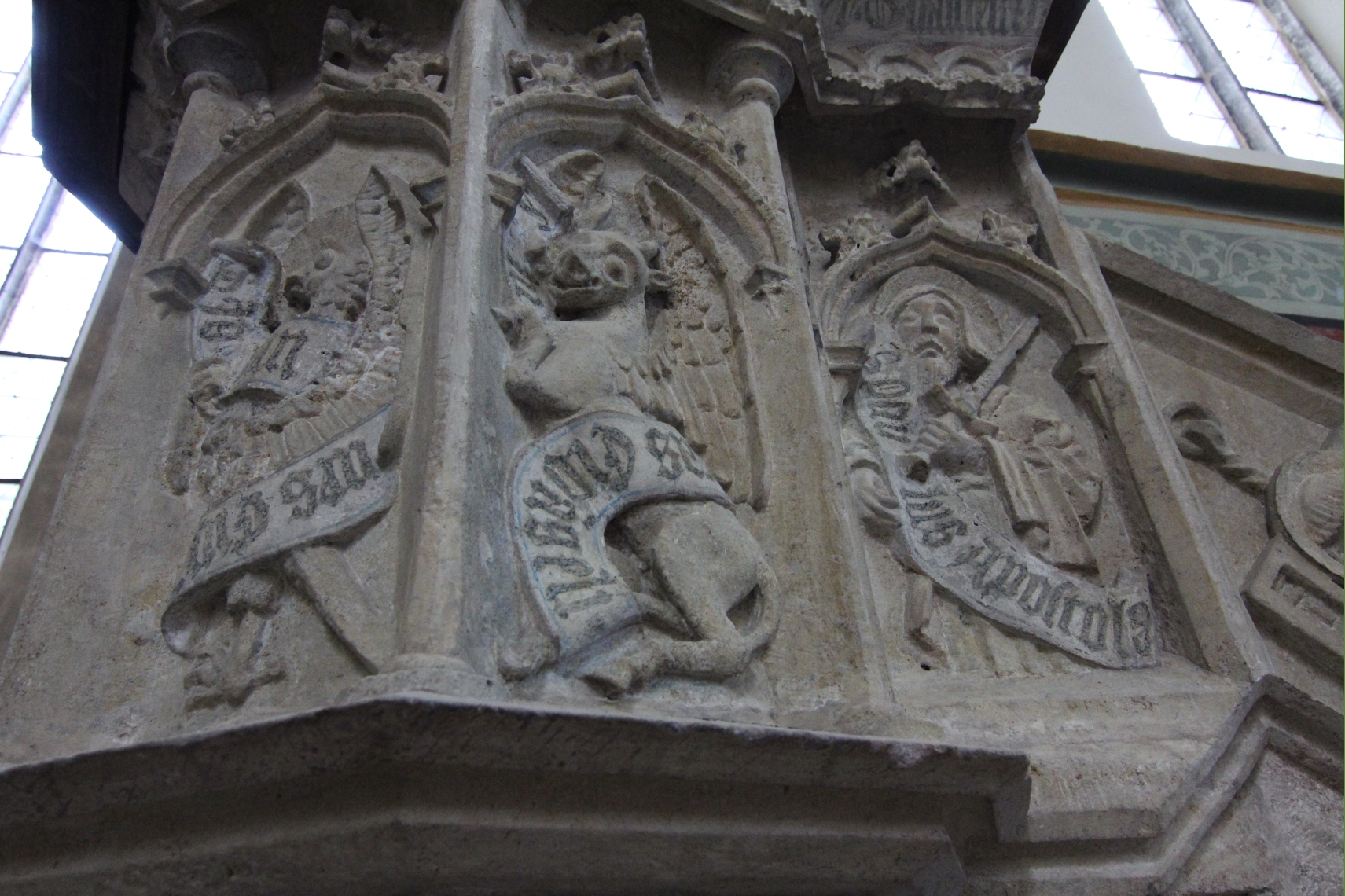
Pulpit in the church in Kaňk (Kutná Hora) from 1504

Matěj Rejsek was born probably in 1445 in Prostějov, Moravia. He was educated at the Augustinian monastery's school in Prostějov. As a young man he came to Prague to study at the Faculty of Arts at the Charles University in Prague. He finished his studies in 1469 as a bachelor and became the rector and teacher at the parish school of the Church of Our Lady before Týn in the Old Town of Prague.

He built some houses in Prague. One of his most famous works is the Powder Tower which was built as a representative gate of the Old Town of Prague after 1475. Matěj Rejsek became the main builder of the tower in 1478. His work was inspired by Petr Parler's work.

In 1489 he moved to Kutná Hora where he worked at the completion of the St. Barbara's Church. Rejsek began to build the outer supporting system, triforium and vaulting. The net vault of the presbytery was completed in 1499.

He died on 1 July 1506 in Kutná Hora and was buried in the St. Barbara's Church.

== Works ==
- Marble tomb for utraquist Bishop Jan Rokycana in the Church of Our Lady before Týn in the Old Town of Prague (1470) – not preserved
- Funeral baldachin for Italian Catholic Bishop Augustine Lucian of Mirandola in the Church of Our Lady before Týn
- Powder Gate (Czech: Prašná brána) in Prague, statues and decoration cut in sandstone (1478–1483)
- Upper part of triforium and vault of choir of St. Barbara's Church, Kutná Hora (1489–1506)
- Pulpit in the St. Lawrence Church in Kaňk near Kutná Hora (1504)
- Pulpit with statues of four signs of evangelists, in the St. Batholomew Church in Rakovník in Central Bohemia (1504)
- Town Hall in Kutná Hora (after 1490) – not preserved

Probably created by Matěj Rejsek:

- Statue of a mythic knight Bruncvík with a lion (Roland statue) at the Charles Bridge in the Lesser Town of Prague, damaged in 1648, since 1875 placed in the Lapidarium of the National Museum in Prague
- Stone fountain in Kutná Hora (1495)

== Honours ==
A relief of Matěj Rejsek, created in 1949, is located on the Prostějov city hall.
