= Inquisition in the Czech lands =

Church institution established to combat heresies

The history of the inquisition in the Czech lands spans nearly two and a half centuries, beginning in 1257. However, it can be said to have functioned consistently for only about 100 years, from around 1315/1318 to around 1415. This church institution, established to combat heresies, took on a rather specific form in this country, as from the mid-14th century it was placed under the direct control of the Archbishop of Prague, whereas the norm was for the Inquisition to be subordinated solely to the Holy See.

Geographically, the Czech Inquisition operated only in the ethnically Czech areas, i.e., Bohemia and Moravia, which, since 1344, formed the ecclesiastical Prague Metropolitanate. Although Silesia had been under the Kingdom of Bohemia since 1327, it remained part of the Polish ecclesiastical province of Gniezno and fell under the jurisdiction of inquisitors from the Polish Dominican province.

== 1257–1318 ==
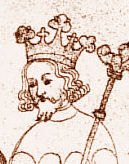
Ottokar II of Bohemia, the initiator of appointing the first inquisitors for the Czech lands

The first inquisitors in the Czech lands were appointed by Pope Alexander IV (1254–1261) on 17 April 1257, at the request of King Ottokar II. They were the Franciscans Bartholomew of Brno and Lambert of Germany. Their appointment was likely prompted by the appearance of a group of Waldensians in neighboring Austria, who may have already been spreading into Bohemia. However, there is no record of any activities by these inquisitors or their potential successors in the 13th century. It is, however, certain that at the beginning of the 14th century, there was no papal Inquisition in Bohemia, as the anti-heresy resolutions of the 1301 synod in Prague only mandated the denunciation of heretics to episcopal officials, without mentioning papal inquisitors.

In 1315, Bishop of Prague, John IV of Dražice, ordered the initiation of inquisitorial proceedings against several individuals suspected of heresy, including the Italian physician Rychardyn of Pavia. The episcopal inquisitors were the Franciscan Walter, titular bishop of Sura, and Thomas Blasius, dean of Brandýs nad Labem-Stará Boleslav (later archdeacon of Prague). For unknown reasons, this investigation ended in a sharp conflict between the bishop and his inquisitors. The bishop refused to approve the death sentences for the fourteen convicted heretics and ordered their release. As a result, he was accused of favoring heresy. Pope John XXII considered the accusations sufficiently justified and suspended the bishop from his duties until the matter was clarified. The pope also appointed papal inquisitors in the Kingdom of Bohemia.

== 1318–c. 1353 ==
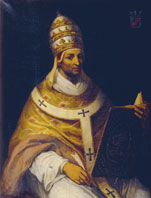
Pope John XXII

On 1 May 1318, Pope John XXII appointed the Dominican Kolda of Koldice and the Franciscan Hartmann of Pilsen as papal inquisitors in the Kingdom of Bohemia. They were to work together in the dioceses of Prague and Olomouc. Kolda died in 1327 and was replaced by the Dominican Rudolf, appointed by John XXII. Hartmann, who was also the Polish-Czech provincial superior of the Franciscans, held the position until 1335.

The new tribunal faced numerous difficulties in its operations. Inquisitor Kolda of Koldice quickly fell into conflict with the municipal authorities of Prague and the Prague canon Michael Folclini. He had to leave the city twice due to threats to his life. The diocesan clergy were also unfavorably inclined toward an Inquisition dominated by religious orders. Meanwhile, Bishop John of Dražice, after clearing himself of charges of supporting heretics and returning to his diocese in 1329, gave strong support to the Inquisition.

In 1335, Pope Benedict XII removed Rudolf and Hartmann of Pilsen from office and divided the territory of Bohemia between newly appointed inquisitors. The Dominican Gallus of Neuhaus was made inquisitor in the Prague diocese, while the Franciscan Peter of Naceradec was appointed inquisitor in the Olomouc diocese. Nothing further is known about Peter of Naceradec, but Gallus, in the 30s and 40s of the 14th century, conducted a large-scale investigation against heretics (mainly Waldensians) in southern Bohemia. It likely involved several thousand people, almost all of whom were of German nationality. His activities led to numerous jurisdictional disputes and sparked active resistance from heretics. His opponents accused him of arbitrariness, while he, in turn, accused them of supporting heresy. Several assassination attempts were made on his life. He died around 1353, probably due to wounds sustained in one such attempt.

Alongside the papal Inquisition, the episcopal Inquisition continued to function in Bohemia. From 1329 to 1345, the office of episcopal inquisitor in the Prague diocese was once again held by Thomas Blasius, the archdeacon of Prague since 1319, who closely collaborated with Gallus of Neuhaus.

== C. 1353–1415 ==
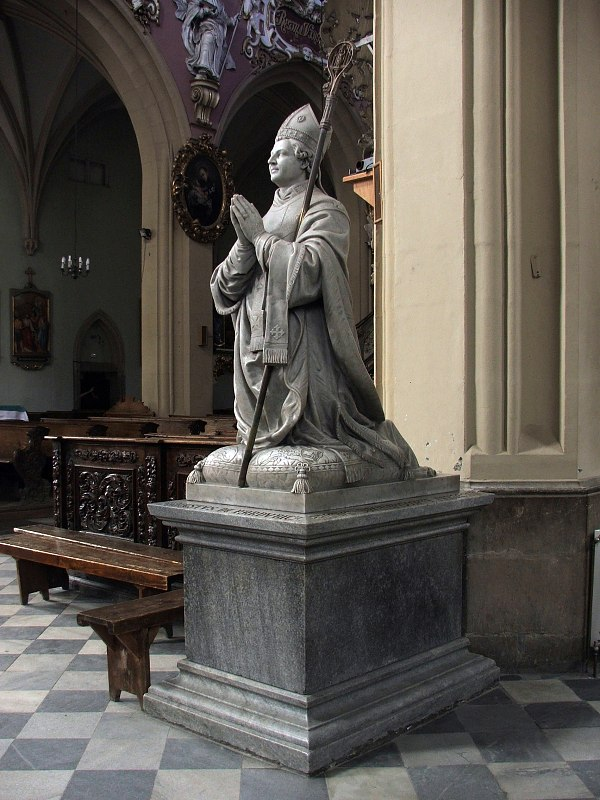
Archbishop Arnošt of Pardubice

After the death of Gallus of Neuhaus, Archbishop of Prague Arnošt of Pardubice, who had recently (in 1344) elevated his diocese to metropolitan status, reorganized the Inquisition in Bohemia. By 1355, he had independently appointed three clergy members to replace Gallus: Jan of Padua (d. 1358), dean of the Vyšehrad chapter, and two Dominicans, Leon and Swatobor. From that point onward, the papal Inquisition in Bohemia was definitively replaced by the episcopal Inquisition, subordinate to the archbishop of Prague. Initially, inquisitors were mostly Dominicans, but later, at the turn of the 14th/15th century, the position was generally entrusted to one of the auxiliary bishops. From 1370 to 1372, the Augustinian Jan Klenkok served as the episcopal inquisitor in the diocese of Olomouc, where he became notorious for seeking out heresy in the German legal compilation Sachsenspiegel.

Sources provide scant information about anti-heretical activities in Bohemia during the second half of the 14th century. The case of the wandering preacher Milíč of Kroměříž, accused of heresy, was examined by the papal curia in Avignon (1374) rather than by Czech inquisitors, whom Pope Gregory XI reprimanded for their inactivity. Milíč managed to clear himself of the charges, but he died in Avignon shortly after the process concluded. In the 1380s, the disciple of Milíč, Matthew of Janov, gained significant popularity and was condemned (along with two other clergy, Andrew and Jacob) by synods in Prague in 1388 and 1389. In the 1390s, Bohemia, along with the eastern and southern regions of Germany, became the focus of a large Inquisition campaign against the Waldensians, led by two traveling episcopal inquisitors, Peter Zwicker of Celje and Martin of Amberg. Martin of Amberg's presence in Bohemia is documented between 1395 and 1396.

The ideas of the Oxford scholar John Wycliffe (d. 1384), condemned in 1382, gained significant support in Bohemia. They especially resonated with professors and students at Prague University. Combined with the popularity of the earlier ideas of Milic and Matthew of Janov, and the native Bohemians' resentment of the Germans who dominated their country (including the clergy), this formed a solid foundation for the emergence of a mass reform movement in Bohemia. In Prague, the so-called Bethlehem Chapel, where sermons in Czech were delivered, began functioning in 1394. From 1402, Jan Hus, dean of the Faculty of Arts at Prague University, served as rector of the Bethlehem Chapel. His sermons, strongly anti-German in tone, gained great popularity. Hus was a supporter of Wycliffe's theories. At this time, two hostile factions formed at Prague University, one supporting Wycliffe's ideas and the other condemning them. This division largely mirrored the ethnic divide between the Czechs and Germans. The then Archbishop of Prague, Zbyněk Zajíc of Hazmburk (d. 1411), initially supported Hus but began opposing the spread of Wycliffe's views from 1408 onward. However, political circumstances allowed the Czech reformers to gain the support of King Wenceslaus IV, as the archbishop remained loyal to the "Roman" Pope Gregory XII, while the king joined the obedience of the Council of Pisa. The Decree of Kutná Hora of 1409 allowed Hus' faction to dominate Prague University and caused a massive exodus of German masters and students. Jan Hus became the university's rector.

By around 1412, Bohemia had a well-established, radical reformist movement under Hus' leadership, further bolstered by the Waldensians who had been persecuted for the past century. This movement alarmed the papal curia. In July 1412, Cardinal Pietro Stefaneschi, the legate of Antipope John XXIII, placed Prague under interdict. Two years later, the titular bishop of Nezaro, Nicholas, was appointed papal inquisitor of Prague. However, in a surprising move, he issued a document certifying the orthodoxy of Jan Hus. Despite this, Hus was summoned to the Council of Constance, which began in November 1414. Despite assurances of safety from King Sigismund, Hus was arrested, tried by the council, and sentenced to be burned at the stake as a heretic. The sentence was confirmed by King Sigismund and carried out on 6 July 1415. A year later, Hus' associate, Jerome of Prague, was also burned at the stake in Constance.

== After 1415 ==
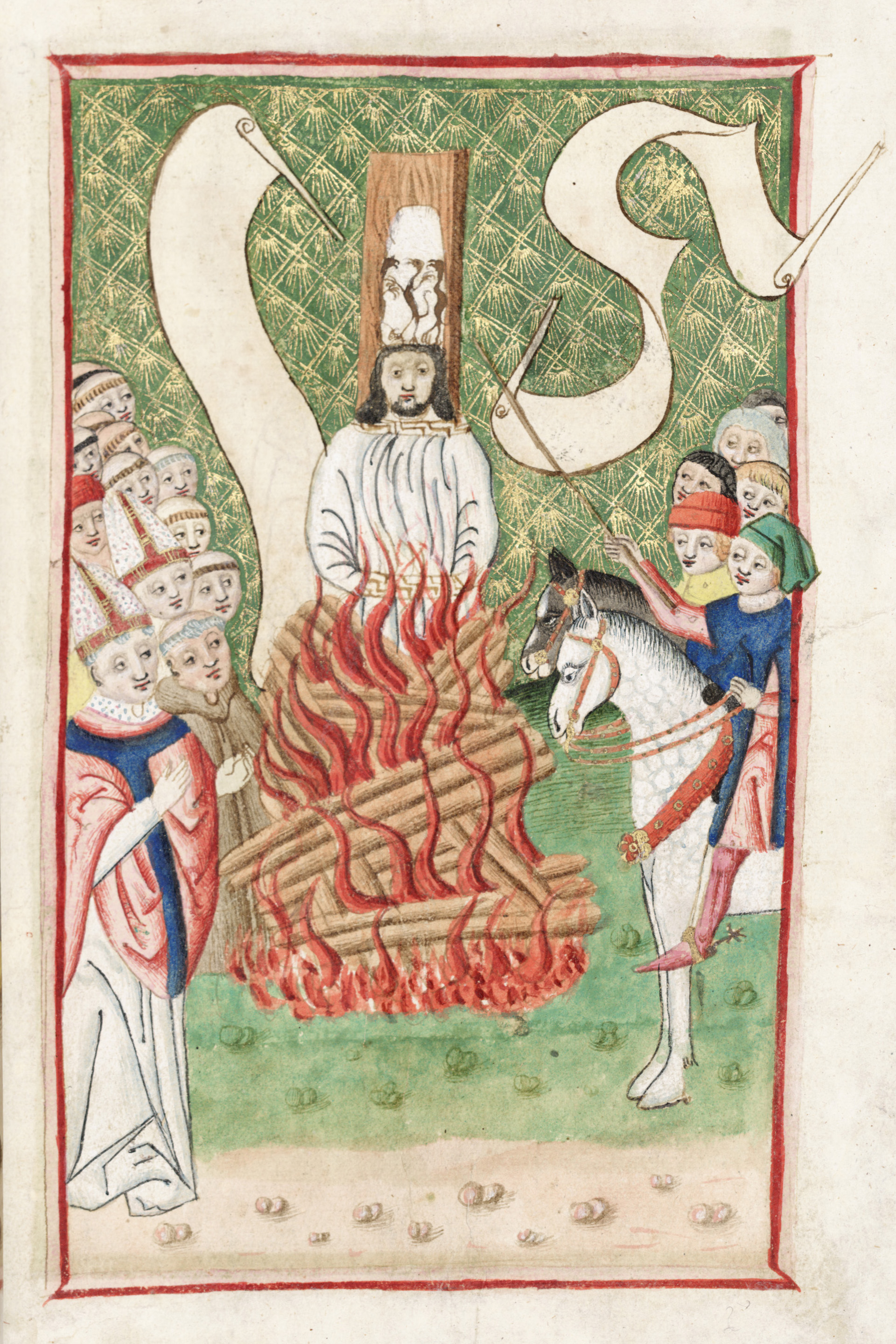
Jan Hus on the stake

The execution of Hus caused widespread outrage in Bohemia. The Czech nobility issued an official protest letter, and a spontaneous revolt erupted throughout the country, during which the Hussites took control of local parishes, removing priests who refused to administer communion under both species, which became a central demand of the Hussites. These events occurred with the complete inaction of the Czech King Wenceslaus IV. In July 1419, the Hussite uprising broke out, intensifying after the death of Wenceslaus IV and the ascension of Sigismund of Luxembourg, who was partly responsible for Hus' execution. Though Sigismund managed to be crowned in Prague, the uprising eventually triumphed, leading to the Hussite Wars that lasted for several years. These wars concluded in 1436 with a compromise between Catholics and the more moderate wing of the Hussites (the Utraquists). The Prague Compacts, agreed upon in that year and ratified by the Compacts of Basel, recognized the orthodoxy and autonomy of the Hussite Church in Bohemia. The radical Hussites (the Taborites), however, were excluded from this agreement and faced significant physical extermination in the final stages of the Hussite Wars (1434).

The events between 1415 and 1419 marked the end of the office of the Inquisitor in Bohemia. For nearly two decades, the country remained largely under the control of the Hussite movement, which enjoyed genuine and widespread support. The 1436 compromise guaranteed Hussites religious freedom and the right to worship. In 1421, Archbishop of Prague, Conrad of Vechta, embraced Hussitism, and in 1437, his successor was elected to be the Utraquist Jan Rokycana.

However, the 1436 agreement did not apply to Hussite sympathizers outside Bohemia, who were still persecuted as heretics. The Catholic Church soon began to gradually withdraw from the agreement, as the papacy never officially confirmed it, and it was based solely on the authority of the Compacts of Basel. Additionally, Archbishop Rokycana never received recognition from the Holy See, and in 1451, Pope Nicholas V sent the Franciscan inquisitor general John of Capistrano, who had held the position since 1426, to Bohemia with an anti-Hussite mission. However, the internal situation in Bohemia did not favor the restoration of the Inquisition. In 1451, the regent of the Kingdom of Bohemia, Utraquist George of Poděbrady, prevented John of Capistrano from carrying out his mission, restricting his activities to preaching. Furthermore, John of Capistrano was not granted permission to visit Prague. In 1458, George of Poděbrady was officially crowned King of Bohemia.

In 1462, Pope Pius II declared the Prague Compacts invalid, and in 1466, his successor, Pope Paul II, excommunicated King George as a heretic and called for a crusade against him. Hungarian King Matthias Corvinus, who claimed rights to the Czech throne, answered this call. In 1461, Italian Franciscan Gabriele Rangone (1410–1486), later a bishop and cardinal, was appointed by Pius II as the "Inquisitor General against Wycliffites and Hussites". However, he had no real opportunity to perform his duties in Bohemia.

Even after George of Poděbrady's death in 1471, the revival of heretic persecution in Bohemia was impossible. The 1485 Compacts of Kutná Hora, renewed in 1512, confirmed the principle of mutual tolerance and religious freedom. Although in 1488, Dominican Order General Gioacchino Torriani appointed the Dominican Valentine of Brno as inquisitor for Hungary and Bohemia, Valentine was based in a Hungarian convent in Banská Štiavnica and there is no evidence that he ever visited Bohemia in his capacity as inquisitor. In fact, he was dismissed from his position in 1489.

In 1500, Pope Alexander VI appointed two German Dominicans, Heinrich Kramer (d. 1505), known for his work Malleus Maleficarum, and Jakob Pamperl (d. 1509) as inquisitors and nuncios for Bohemia and Moravia. However, it is doubtful whether Pamperl ever visited Bohemia. Kramer's activities were most likely limited to preaching, engaging in theological debates with heretics, and writing polemical treatises. One papal brief instructed Kramer to collect heretical books and send them to the bishop of Olomouc, Stanislaus Thurzo, to be burned. However, there is no evidence that any trials against Czech heretics were held during this period. They were the last inquisitors in Bohemia.

== Number of convicted ==
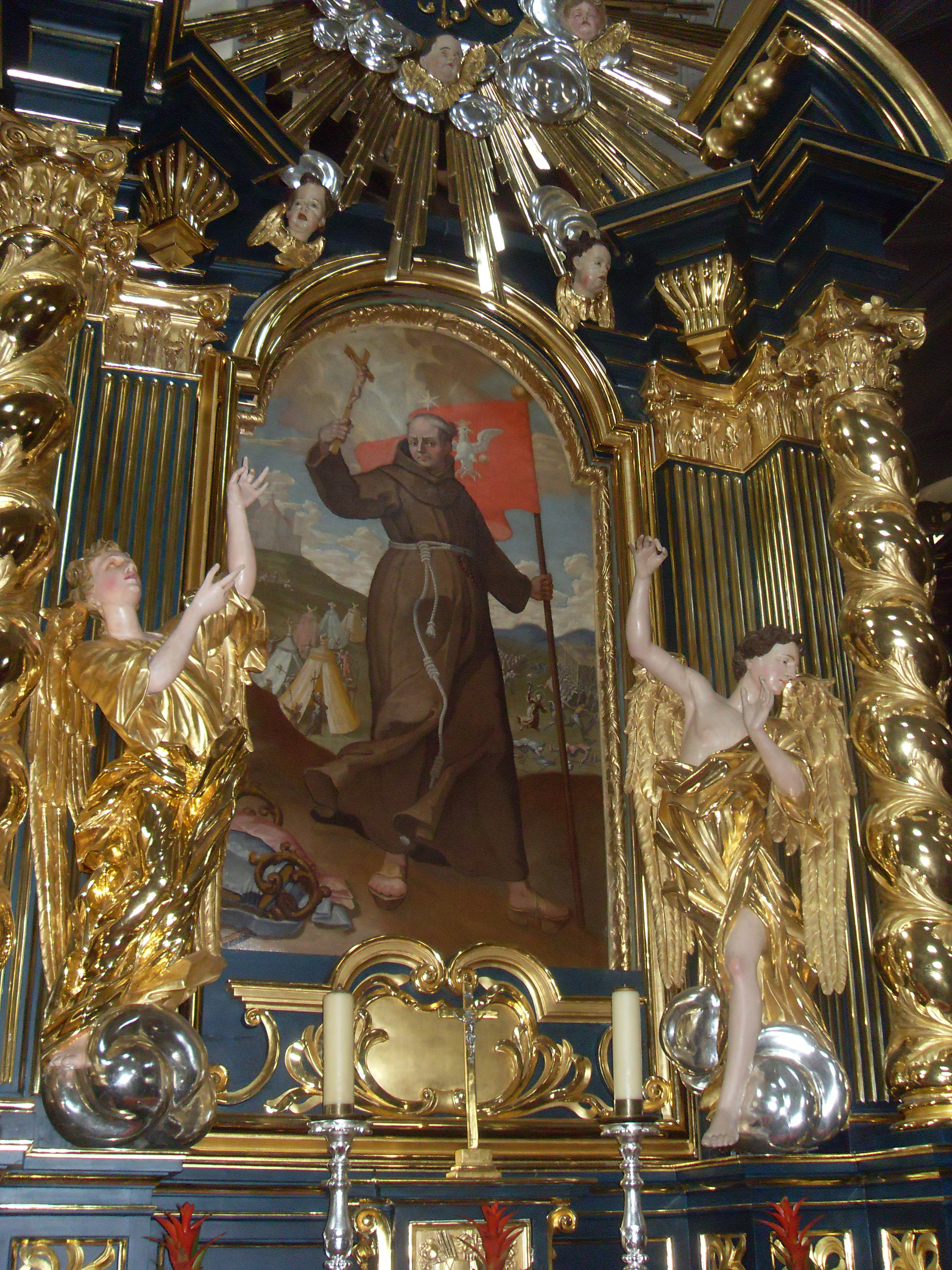
General Inquisitor John of Capistrano

The numerical data concerning the activities of the Inquisition in Bohemia are, as everywhere else, incomplete. However, based on the surviving materials, it can be stated that in the 14th century, this region was among those with particularly intense anti-heretical activity. In connection with the case of Rychardyn of Pavia (1315–1318), episcopal inquisitors issued 14 death sentences, which were not carried out because Bishop John pardoned the condemned. The fragmentarily preserved records of Inquisitor Gallus of Neuhaus (1335–1353) document the interrogation of about 300 individuals (including over 30 witnesses) and report 14 executions as well as one case of burning exhumed remains. Based on this, it is estimated that investigations conducted by this inquisitor involved around 4,000 suspects (mainly Waldensians), of whom over 200 were burned. Numerous trials of Czech Waldensians also took place as part of a major campaign against this sect in Central Europe at the end of the 14th century. Between approximately 1393 and 1395, in Germany’s Thuringia and Meissen, as well as in Bohemia and Moravia, around 1,000 Waldensians were reconciled with the church.

During his stay in Moravia in 1451–1452, John of Capistrano brought about over 11,000 conversions to Catholicism. However, these were exclusively voluntary conversions influenced by his sermons and not the result of inquisitorial proceedings, as the Franciscan was not authorized to conduct such actions in Bohemia.

== Bibliography ==
- Kras, Paweł (2010). "Inkwizycja papieska w Europie Środkowo-Wschodniej. Powstanie i organizacja" [The Papal Inquisition in Central and Eastern Europe. Formation and Organization]. In Kras, Paweł (ed.). Inkwizycja papieska w Europie środkowo-wschodniej [The Papal Inquisition in Central and Eastern Europe] (in Polish). Kraków: Esprit SC. ISBN 978-83-61989-33-2.
- Soukop, Pavel (2010). "Inkvizitoři v Čechách v letach 1315–1415" [Inquisitors in Bohemia from 1315 to 1415]. In Kras, Paweł (ed.). Inkwizycja papieska w Europie środkowo-wschodniej [The Papal Inquisition in Central and Eastern Europe] (in Polish). Kraków: Esprit SC. ISBN 978-83-61989-33-2.
- Lambert, Malcolm (2002). Średniowieczne herezje [Medieval Heresies] (in Polish). Gdańsk; Warsaw: MARABUT. ISBN 83-916989-5-5.
- Lea, Henry Charles (1887). A History of the Inquisition of the Middle Ages. Vol. II. London; New York: MacMillan Co.
- Lerner, Robert (2007). The Heresy of the Free Spirit in the Middle Ages. University of Notre Dame Press. ISBN 978-0-268-01094-2.
- Patchovsky, Alexander (1979). Quellen zur böhmischen Inquisition im. 14. Jahrhundert [Sources on the Bohemian Inquisition in the 14th Century] (in German). Weimar: Monumenta Germaniae Historica.
