= Czech lands =

Historical regions of the Czech Republic

Coordinates: 49°45′N 15°30′E

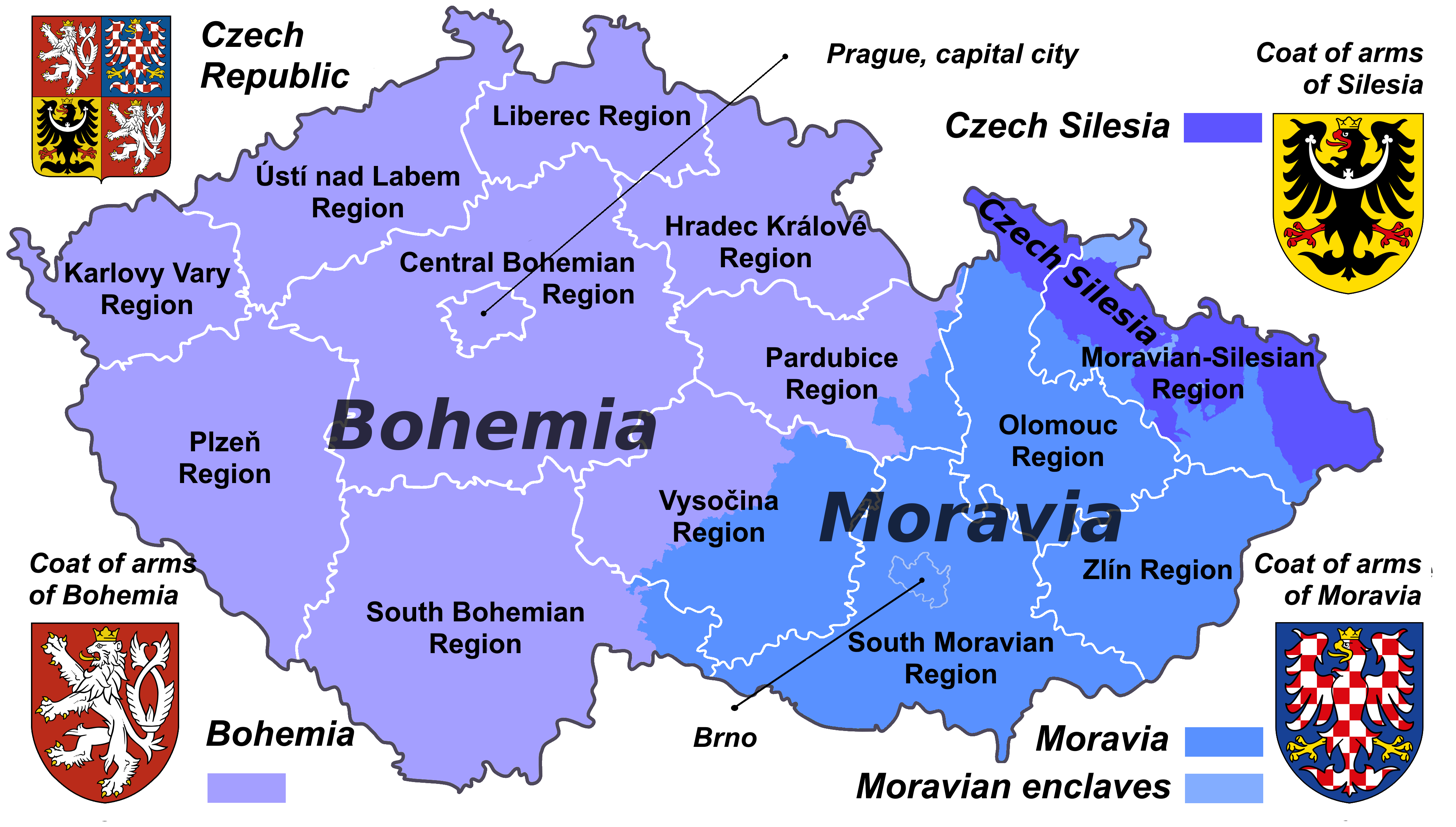
Czech historical lands and current administrative regions (kraje)

The Czech lands (Czech: České země, pronounced [ˈtʃɛskɛː ˈzɛmɲɛ]) is a historical-geographical term which denotes the three historical regions of Bohemia, Moravia, and Czech Silesia out of which Czechoslovakia, and later the Czech Republic and Slovakia, were formed. Together the three have formed the Czech part of Czechoslovakia since 1919, and the Czech Republic since 1 January 1993.

In a historical context, Czech texts use the term to refer to any territory ruled by the Kings of Bohemia, i.e., the lands of the Bohemian Crown (země Koruny české) as established by Emperor Charles IV in the 14th century. This includes territories like the Lusatias (which in 1635 fell to Saxony) and the whole of Silesia, which at the time were all ruled from Prague Castle. Since the conquest of Silesia by the Prussian king Frederick the Great in the First Silesian War in 1742, the remaining lands of the Bohemian Crown—Bohemia, Moravia and Austrian Silesia—have been more or less co-extensive with the territory of the modern-day Czech Republic.

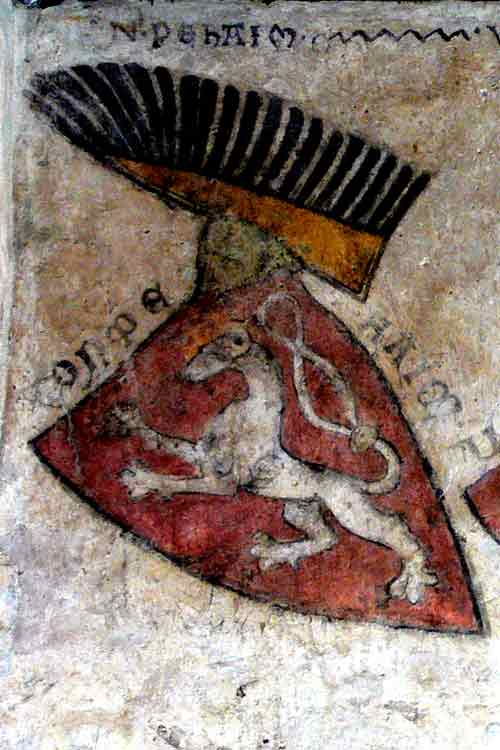
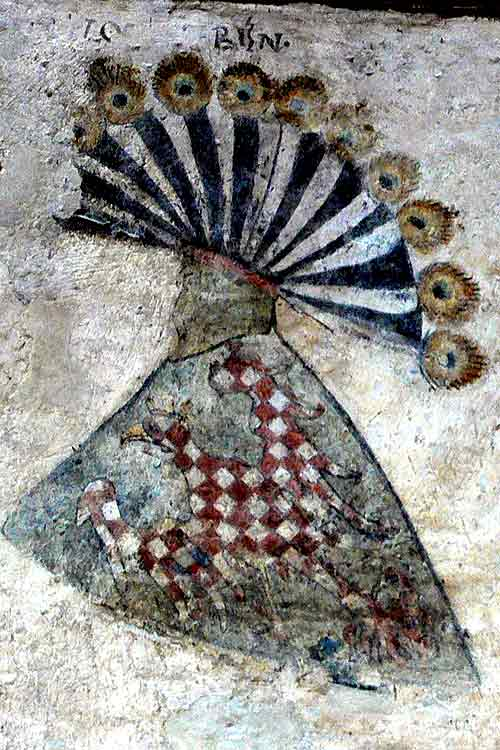
The oldest depiction of coat of arms of Bohemia (left) and Moravia (right), castle Gozzoburg in Krems, fresco painting from the 13th century. The fresco decoration of the hall of Gozzoburg Castle in Krems was made no later than around 1270 (1269), or in connection with the newly built Catherine's Chapel (1267), certainly after 1262.

== Alternative names ==
The term Czech lands has been used to describe different things by different people. While the Czech name of Bohemia proper is Čechy, the adjective český refers to both "Bohemian" and "Czech". The non-auxiliary term (i.e. the term used in official Czech geographical terminology lists) for the present-day Czech lands (i.e. Bohemia, Moravia, Czech Silesia) is Česko. This term is documented as early as 1704, but in that time meant only Bohemia (Čechy).

During the period of the First and Second Czechoslovak Republics, the Czech lands were frequently referred to as Historical lands, in particular when mentioned together with Slovakia (which was never an autonomous historical region within the Kingdom of Hungary).

== History ==
The Bohemia had been settled by Celts (Boii) from 5th century BC until the 2nd century AD, and then by various Germanic tribes (Marcomanni, Quadi, Lombards and others) until they moved on to the west during the Migration Period (1st–5th century). At the beginning of the 5th century the population decreased dramatically and, according to mythology, was led by a chieftain named Čech. The first Western Slavs came in the second half of the 6th century. In the course of the decline of the Great Moravian realm during the Hungarian invasions of Europe in the 9th and 10th centuries, the Czech Přemyslid dynasty established the Duchy of Bohemia. Backed by the East Frankish kings, they prevailed against the reluctant Bohemian nobility and extended their rule eastwards over the adjacent Moravia.

In 1198, Duke Ottokar I of Bohemia received the royal title by the German anti-king Philip of Swabia. Attached to his Kingdom of Bohemia was the Margraviate of Moravia established in 1182 and Kłodzko Land, the later County of Kladsko. From the second part of the 13th century onwards, German colonists ("German Bohemians"), who had already been living in Prague since the early 12th century, settled in the mountainous border area on the basis of the king's invitation during the Ostsiedlung.

The Silesian lands north of the Sudetes mountain range had been ruled by the Polish Piast dynasty from the 10th century onwards. While Bohemia rose to a kingdom, the Silesian Piasts alienated from the fragmenting Kingdom of Poland. After in 1310 the Bohemian crown had passed to the mighty House of Luxembourg, nearly all Silesian dukes pledged allegiance to King John the Blind, and in 1335 the Polish king Casimir III the Great officially renounced Silesia via the Treaty of Trentschin. King John had also acquired the lands of Bautzen and Görlitz (later Upper Lusatia) in 1319 and 1329. His son and successor Charles IV, also King of the Romans since 1346, incorporated the Silesian and Lusatian estates into the Bohemian Crown and upon his coronation as Holy Roman Emperor confirmed their indivisibility from and affiliation with the Holy Roman Empire.

In 1367 Emperor Charles IV also purchased the former March of Lusatia (Lower Lusatia) in the northwest. However, during the Thirty Years' War both Lusatias passed to the Electorate of Saxony by the Peace of Prague. After the Bohemian Crown (Crown of Saint Wenceslas) passed to the House of Habsburg in 1526, the Bohemian crown lands together with the Kingdom of Hungary and the Austrian "hereditary lands" became part of the larger Habsburg monarchy. In 1742 the Habsburg queen Maria Theresa lost the bulk of Silesia to Prussia in the First Silesian War, part of the War of the Austrian Succession.

The Czech state in form of Duchy of Bohemia (green) in 11th century, within the Holy Roman Empire (light green)

Czech lands in form of Lands of the Bohemian Crown (red) in the 17th century, within Holy Roman Empire

== Coats of arms ==
The coat of arms of the Czech Republic incorporates those of the three integral Czech lands: Bohemia proper, Moravia, and Czech Silesia. The arms of Bohemia originated with the Kingdom of Bohemia, like those of Moravia with the Moravian margraviate. The arms of Czech Silesia originated as those of all of the historical region of Silesia, much of which is now in Poland.

Bohemia, also used as the Lesser coat of arms of the modern Czech Republic

Moravia

Silesia

Greater coat of arms of the present-day Czech Republic

Coat of arms of the Bohemian crown lands (until 1635), clockwise from left above: (checked) Eagle of Moravia, Eagle of Lower Silesia, Ox of Lower Lusatia, Eagle of Upper Silesia, Wall of Upper Lusatia, en surtout Bohemian Lion, upon Crown of Saint Wenceslas, garlanded by lime. Drawn by Hugo Gerard Ströhl (1851–1919).

== See also ==
- Protectorate of Bohemia and Moravia
- Kłodzko Land
- Inquisition in the Czech lands

== Sources ==
- Pánek, Jaroslav; Tůma Oldřich; et al. (2009). A History of the Czech lands. Prague: Karolinum. ISBN 978-80-246-1645-2.
