= Vlčkovice v Podkrkonoší =

- Municipality
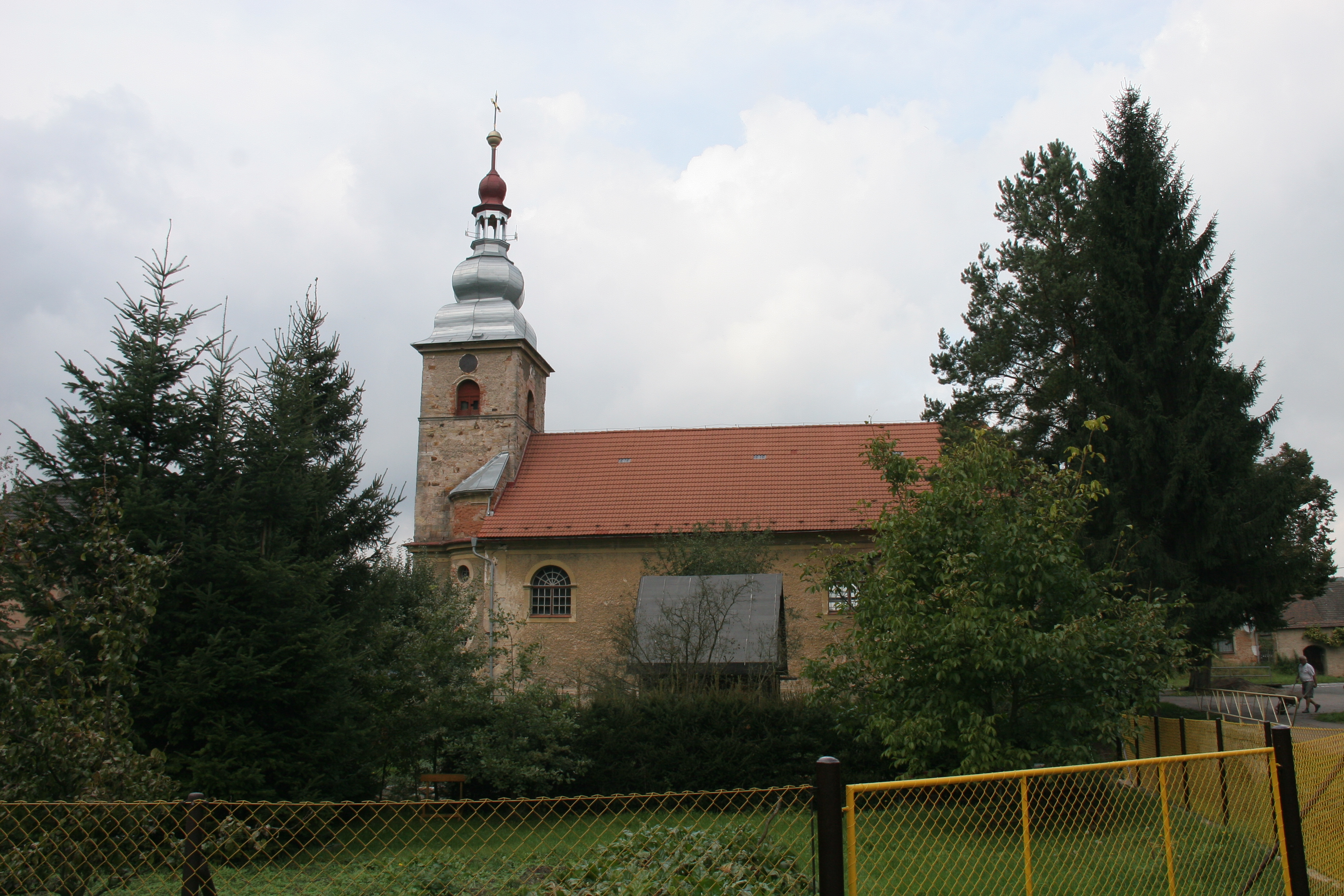
- Church of Saint Joseph

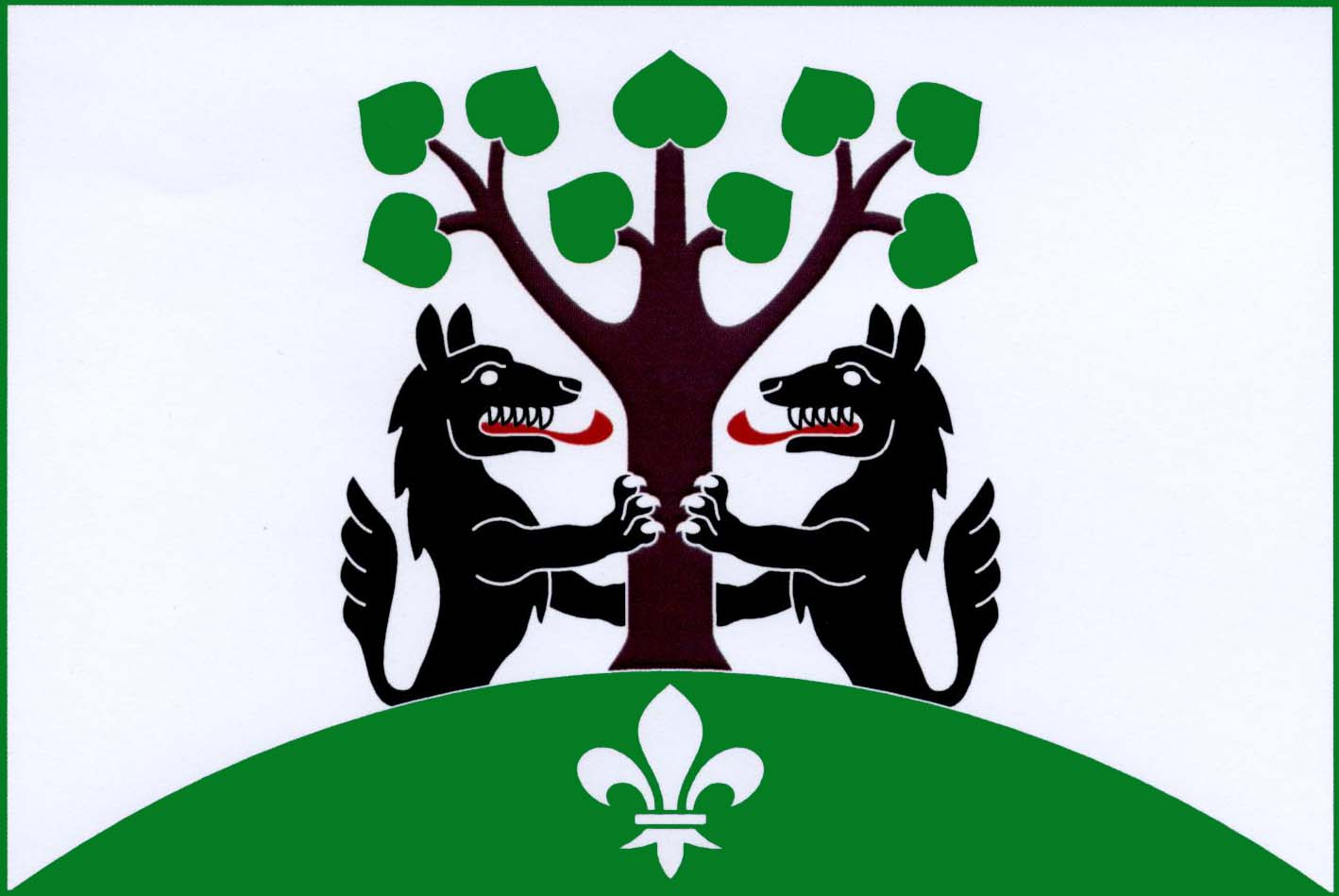
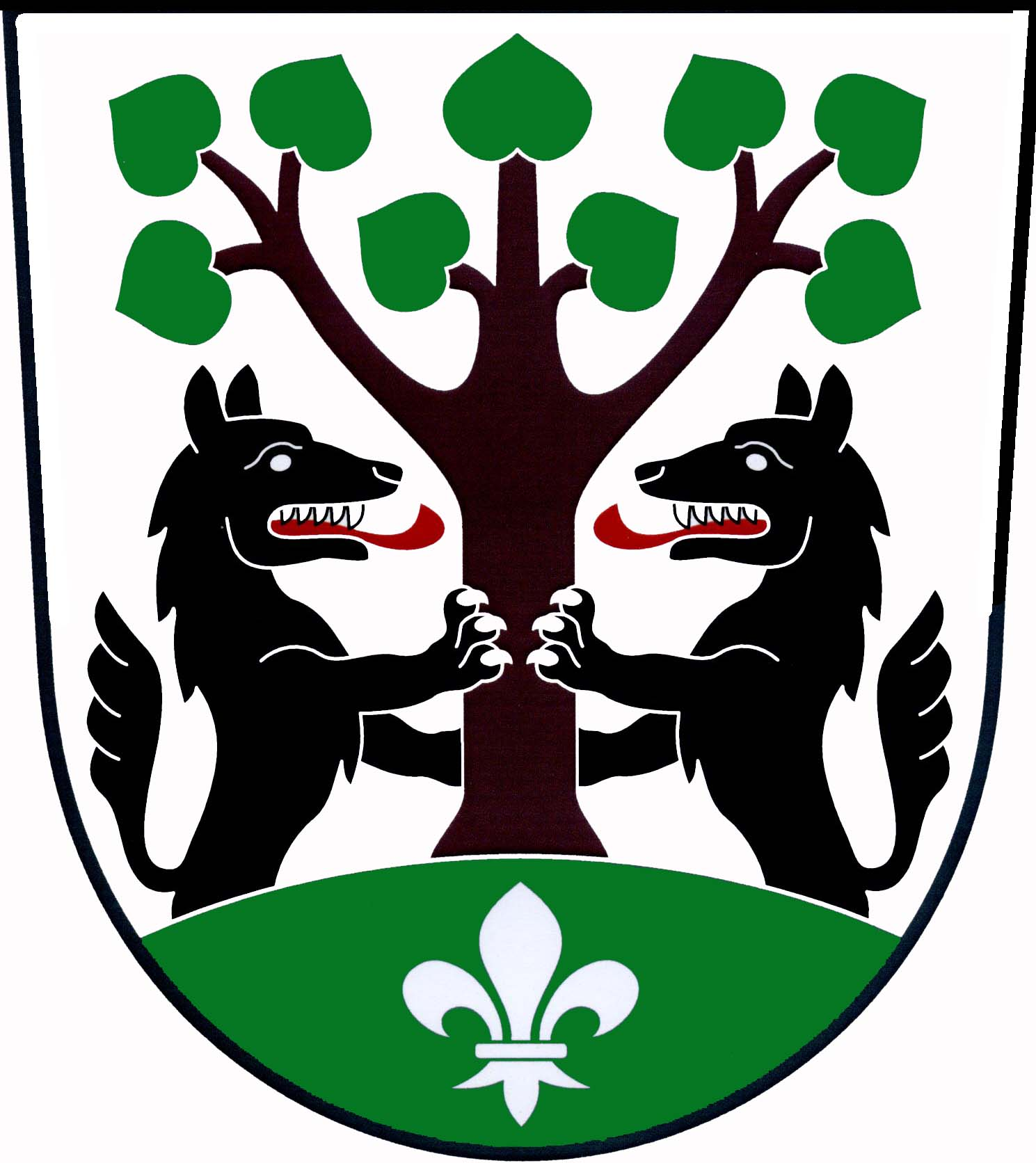
- Flag Coat of arms

- Location in the Czech Republic
- Coordinates: 50°24′46″N 15°54′41″E
- Country: Czech Republic
- Region: Hradec Králové
- District: Trutnov
- First mentioned: 1415

Area
  - Total: 11.81 km^{2} (4.56 sq mi)
- Elevation: 287 m (942 ft)

Population (2026-01-01)
  - Total: 372
  - Density: 31.5/km^{2} (81.6/sq mi)
- Time zone: UTC+1 (CET)
  - Summer (DST): UTC+2 (CEST)
- Postal code: 544 01
- Website: vlckovice.cz

Vlčkovice v Podkrkonoší (German: Wölsdorf) is a municipality and village in Trutnov District in the Hradec Králové Region of the Czech Republic. It has about 400 inhabitants.

== Administrative division ==
Vlčkovice v Podkrkonoší consists of two municipal parts (in brackets population according to the 2021 census):

- Dolní Vlčkovice (144)
- Horní Vlčkovice (214)

== History ==
The first written mention of Vlčkovice is from 1415.

== Demographics ==
Historical population
Year	Pop.	±%
1869	1,094	—
1880	1,067	−2.5%
1890	1,050	−1.6%
1900	1,005	−4.3%
1910	995	−1.0%
1921	789	−20.7%
1930	864	+9.5%
1950	555	−35.8%
1961	514	−7.4%
1970	503	−2.1%
1980	447	−11.1%
1991	378	−15.4%
2001	391	+3.4%
2011	388	−0.8%
2021	358	−7.7%
Source: Censuses

== Notable people ==
- Jan Jiří Balzer (1736–1799), engraver
