= Church of Our Lady before Týn =

Church of Our Lady in front of Týn
- Kostel Matky Boží před Týnem; Parish Church of the Mother of God in front of Týn
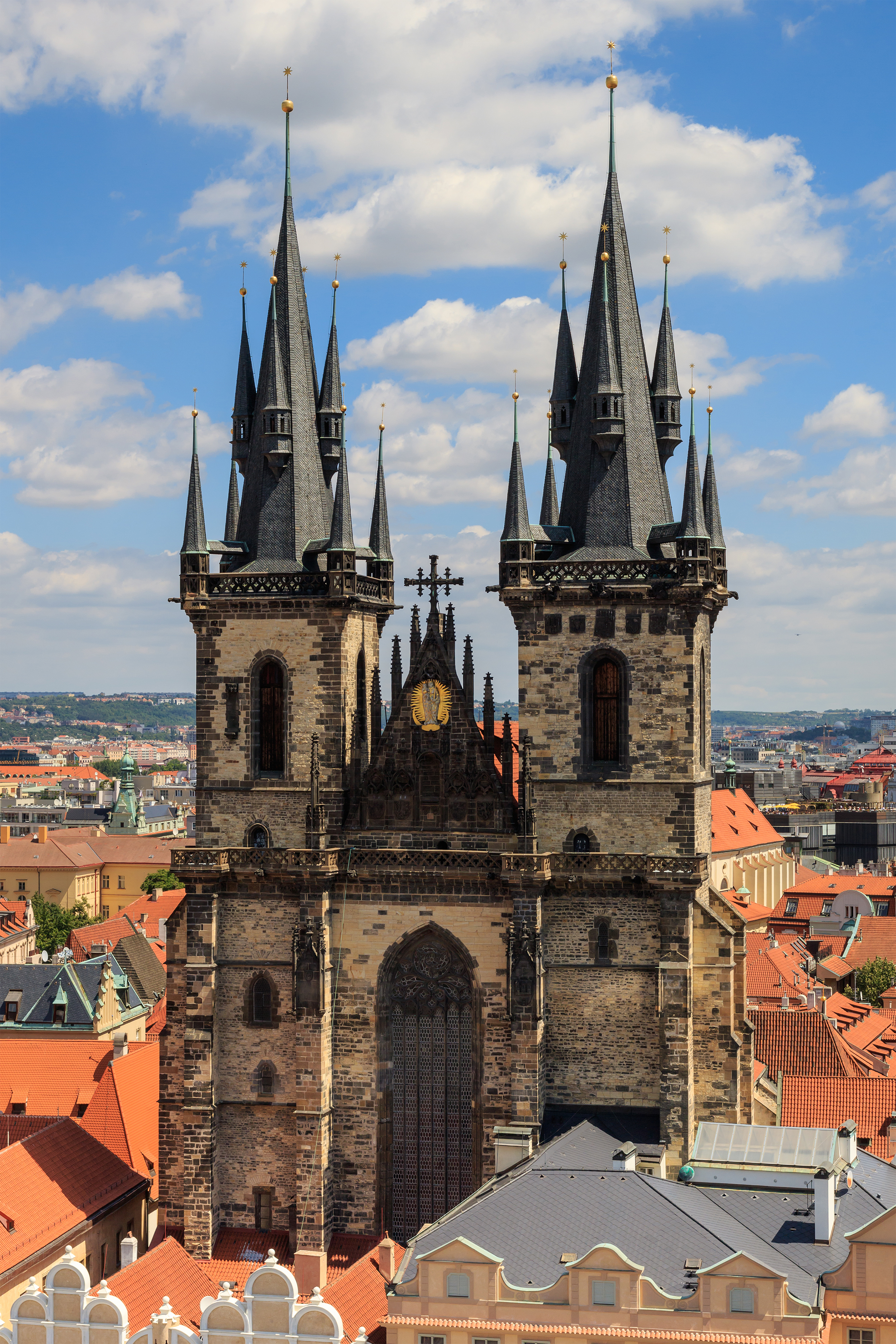
- Church of Our Lady in front of Týn, from Old Town Square
- Church of Our Lady in front of Týn
- 50°05′15″N 14°25′22″E
- Location: Prague
- Country: Czech Republic
- Denomination: Roman Catholic
- Previous denomination: Hussites
- Website: www.tyn.cz/cz

History
- Founded: 14th century

Architecture
- Functional status: Parish Church
- Architectural type: Gothic

Administration
- Diocese: Archdiocese of Prague

Clergy
- Archbishop: Archbishop Dominik Duka

The Church of the Mother of God in front of Týn (in Czech Kostel Matky Boží před Týnem, also Týnský chrám ("Týn Church") or just Týn), or Church of Our Lady in front of Týn, is a Gothic church and a dominant feature of the Old Town of Prague, Czech Republic. It has been the main church of this part of the city since the 14th century. The church's two towers are 80 m high, and each tower's spire is topped by eight smaller spires in two layers of four.

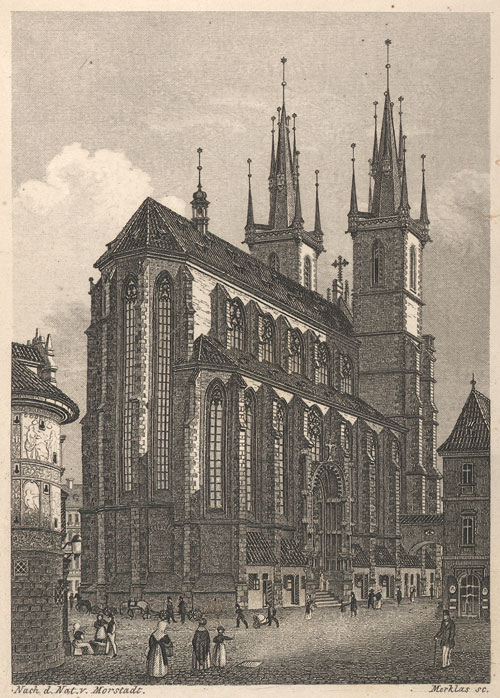
Church from east, in a print of the 19th century

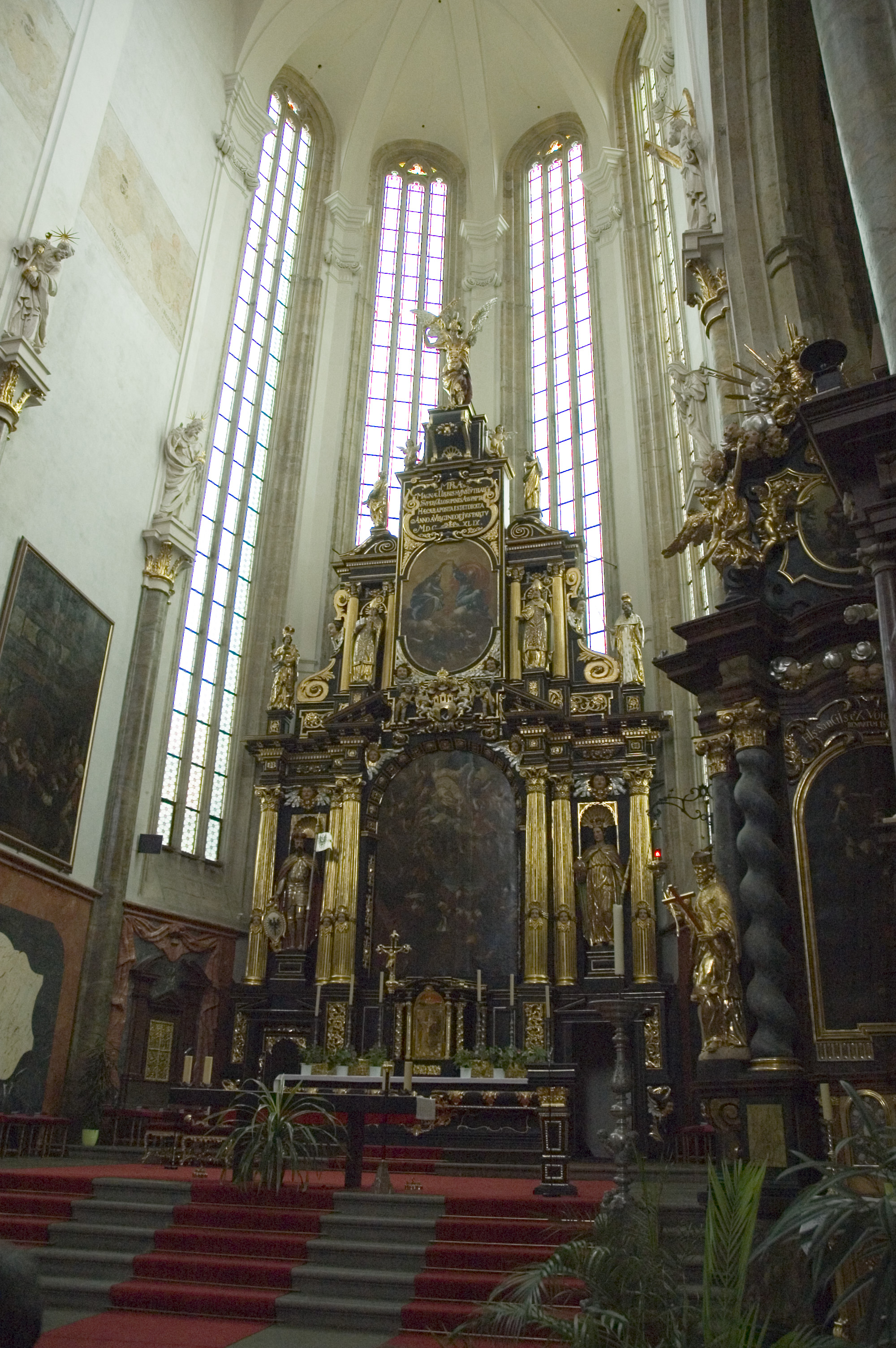
Altar from 1649 with a painting by Karel Škréta

== History ==
In the 11th century, the Old Town plaza area was occupied by a Romanesque church, which was built for foreign merchants coming to the nearby Týn Courtyard. It was replaced by an early Gothic Church of Our Lady before Týn in 1256. The church became the center of the German inhabitants of Prague's Old Town. Construction of the present church began in the 14th century. The church was designed in the late Gothic style under the influence of Matthias of Arras and later Peter Parler. By the beginning of the 15th century, construction was almost complete; only the towers, the gable and roof were missing. The church was controlled by Hussites for two centuries, including John of Rokycan, future royal administrator of the vacant Archdiocese of Prague, who became the church's vicar in 1427. The building was completed in the 1450s, while the gable and northern tower were completed shortly thereafter during the reign of George of Poděbrady (1453–1471). His sculpture was placed on the gable, below a huge golden chalice, the symbol of the Hussites. The southern tower was not completed until 1511, under architect Matěj Rejsek.

The lost Battle of White Mountain (1620) ushered in an era of harsh recatholicisation (part of the Counter-Reformation). Consequently, the sculptures of "heretic king" George of Poděbrady and the chalice were removed in 1626 and replaced by a sculpture of the Virgin Mary, featuring a giant halo made by melting down the chalice. In 1679 the church was struck by lightning, and the subsequent fire heavily damaged the old vault, which was later replaced by a lower Baroque vault.

Renovation works carried out in 1876–1895 were later reversed during extensive exterior renovation works in the years 1973–1995. Interior renovation is still in progress. In August 2017 the Czech Bishops Conference resolved to restore the Golden Chalice, installing a temporary model before the end of the month.The final gilded copper sheet sculpture was designed by Petr Malinský and includes engravings of the year and the emblems of the Archbishopric of Prague, the Capital City of Prague and the Czech lion on the border.

== Design ==
The north-eastern portal is an example of Gothic sculpture from the Parler workshop, with a relief depicting the Crucifixion. The main entrance is located on the church's western face, through a narrow passage between the houses in front of the church.

== Architecture ==
The strikingly vertical, basilically arranged three-aisled Gothic church contains a pair of Gothic prismatic towers in the west. In the east, the church is terminated by a short presbytery of one rectangular field, polygonal closed by four sides of the octagon. The side aisles are finished with deep polygonal chapels with five sides of the octagon. The side aisles are vaulted with five cross-ribbed vaults on an almost square floor plan, which is joined by one cross rib vault in the tower. The nave and the presbytery are then vaulted by six rectangular, wide-ranging fields of compressed Baroque arches with triangular sections. The side aisles have retained the original Gothic ribbed vault. The church is illuminated by a number of cantilevered Gothic windows with stone tracery. The church is accessible by four Gothic portals. The northern portal has a relief in the tympanum depicting three scenes from Christ's Passion in multi- figured compositions. High-quality sculptural work is one of the most important monuments of Gothic sculpture of the pre- Hussite period in our country. The pair of towers is topped with decorated cantilevered Late Gothic octagonal helmets, which are complemented by a gallery, four corner turrets, and, halfway through, another four decorative turrets. There is a Gothic gable containing the Baroque relief of the Madonna, that is surrounded by rows of finials in between the towers.

== Furnishing ==
=== Gothic ===
The original medieval furnishing have been preserved in the interior:

- A stone baldaquin from 1493, probably from the workshop of Matěj Rejsek which originally covered the tomb of bishop Augustin Luciano of Mirandola. The baldaquin's floorplan is a square. It consists of four medium-sized stone polychrome abutments, which are terminated by the so-called ogee arch. These arches are complemented by corner decorative turrets and enriched with Gothic ornaments. Statues are placed on each support, roughly in the second third. The supports that carry the architrave culminate in finials. From the eastern side, the baldaquin is decorated with paintings by Karel Škréta.
- An altar with a central image of Christ's baptism was carved in high relief around 1530 by the Master IP (or Monogrammist IP), who was active in the circles of courtly patrons near today's Czech–German border. The images from Christ's life carved in the side panels on the wings show the influence of prints made by Albrecht Dürer.
- The baptistery of 1414 (the oldest and largest in Prague)
- A stone pulpit in the nave
- Two works of the so-called Týn Calvary Master from the 15th century that are very valuable: Madonna of the Týn and the Calvary sculpture at the ending of the north aisle.

=== Baroque ===
The church's furniture is mostly Baroque. The Baroque furnishings, made by woodcarvings of early Baroque altars, are eye catching as is the valuable pipe organ by Jan J. Mundt from 1670 to 1673 that is one of the three oldest preserved pipe organs in Prague. From 1691, the musicologist Tomáš Baltazar Janovka worked there as organist for fifty years. The main altar from 1649 with a titular painting of the Assumption of the Virgin Mary is also very valuable. The painting was by one of the prominent Czech Baroque artist, Karel Škréta, the painter of several other side altar canvases. In the church can be found works of other Baroque masters: sculptors Jan Jiří Bendl and Ignác František Weiss (altar sculptures), Jan Heidelberger (sculpture of St. Francis de Paul in the northern nave), painters M. Strasser (Finding the Holy Cross, moved from the main altar), Jan Jiří Heinsch (the painting of St. Joseph in the north aisle, the altarpiece of the Family Tree of Jesse), Michael Václav Halbax (the painting of Saints Crispin and Crispinian), Petr Brandl (The arrival of St. Wenceslas at the Reichstag). From the Renaissance and the Baroque periods, a collection of carved tombstones and epitaphs has been preserved, including the 1601 tombstone of astronomer Tycho Brahe, which is located at the first southern pillar of the nave.

== Gallery ==
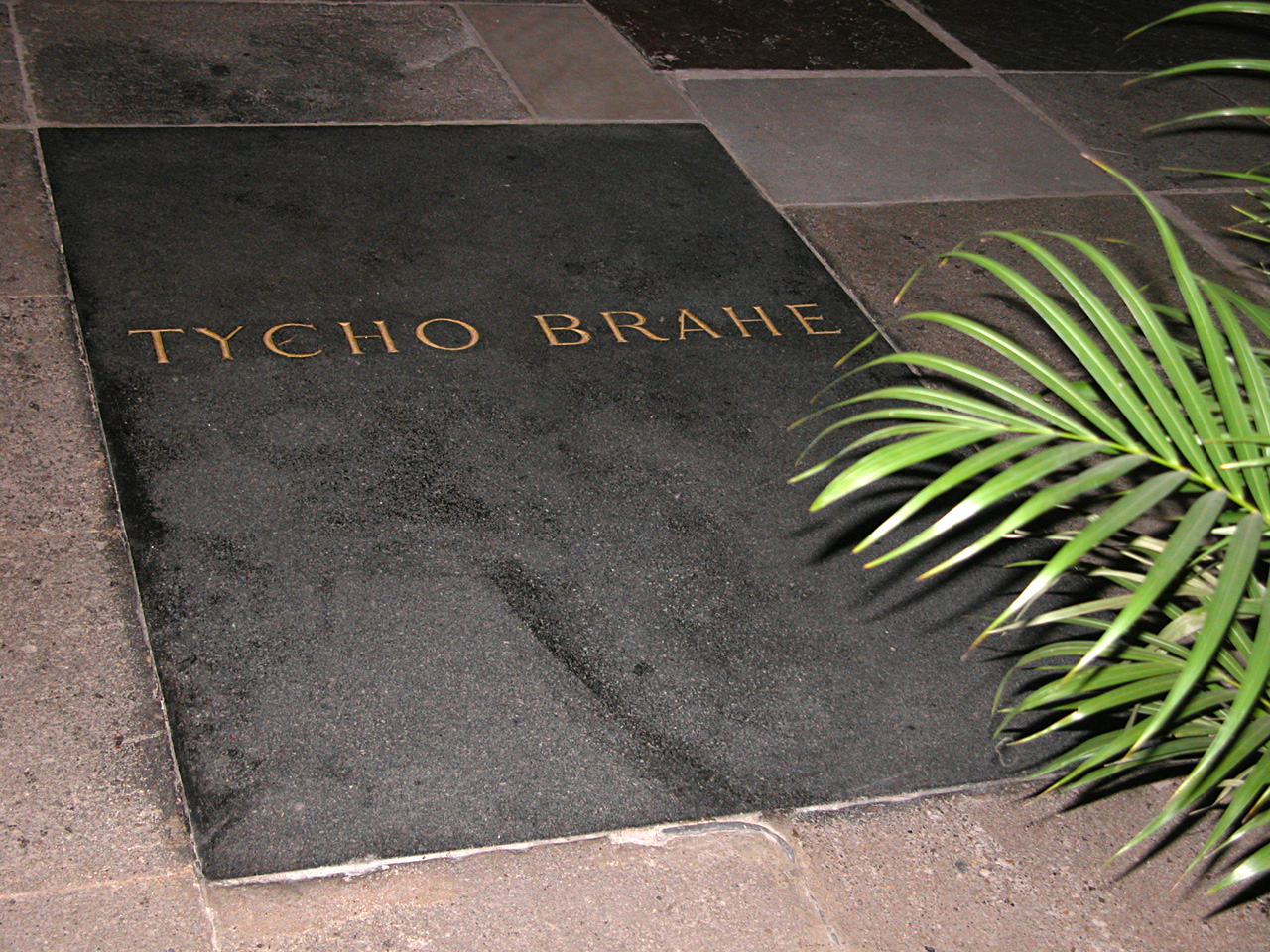
Tycho Brahe's grave, new tombstone from 1901

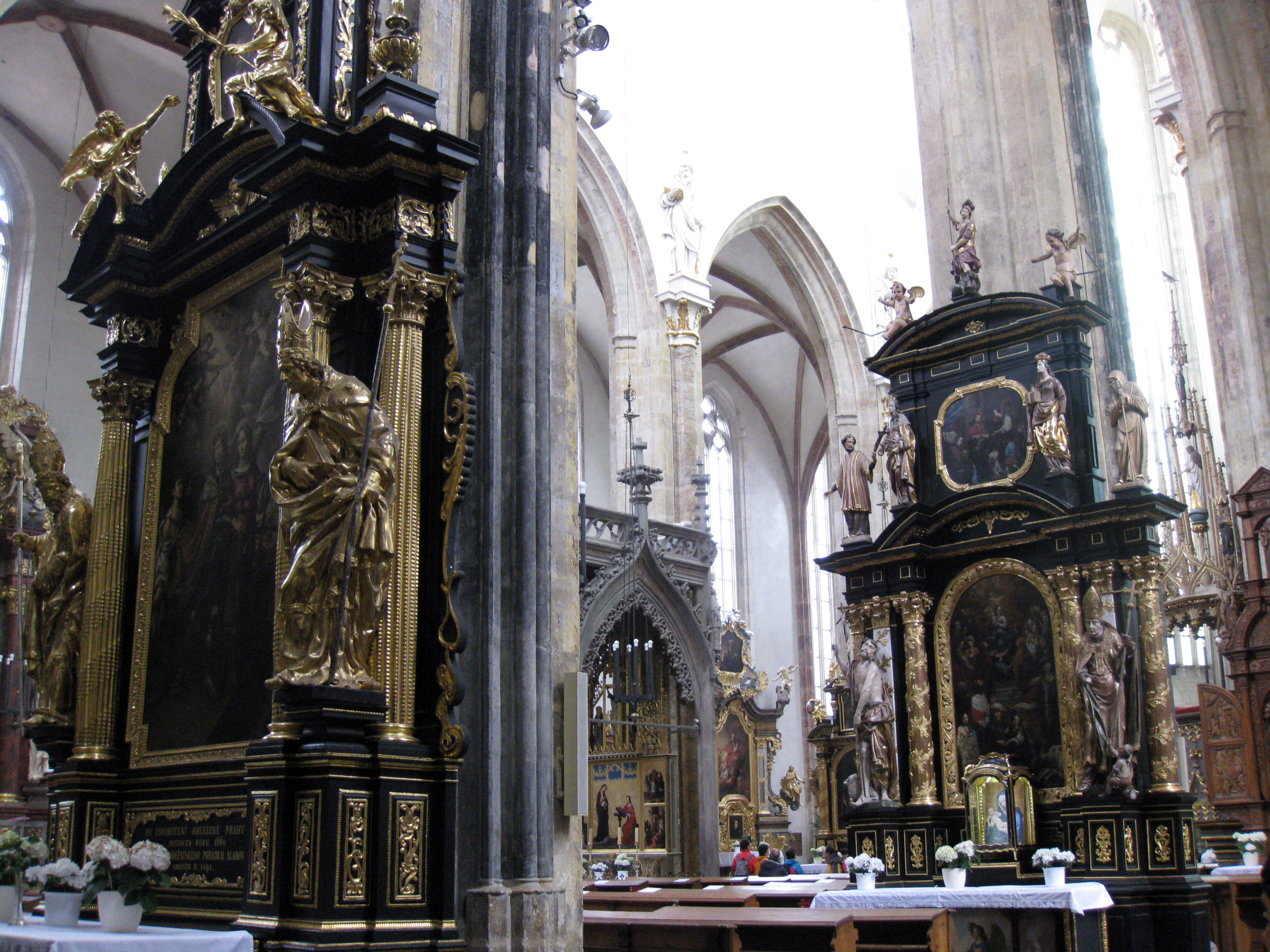
Interior of the church

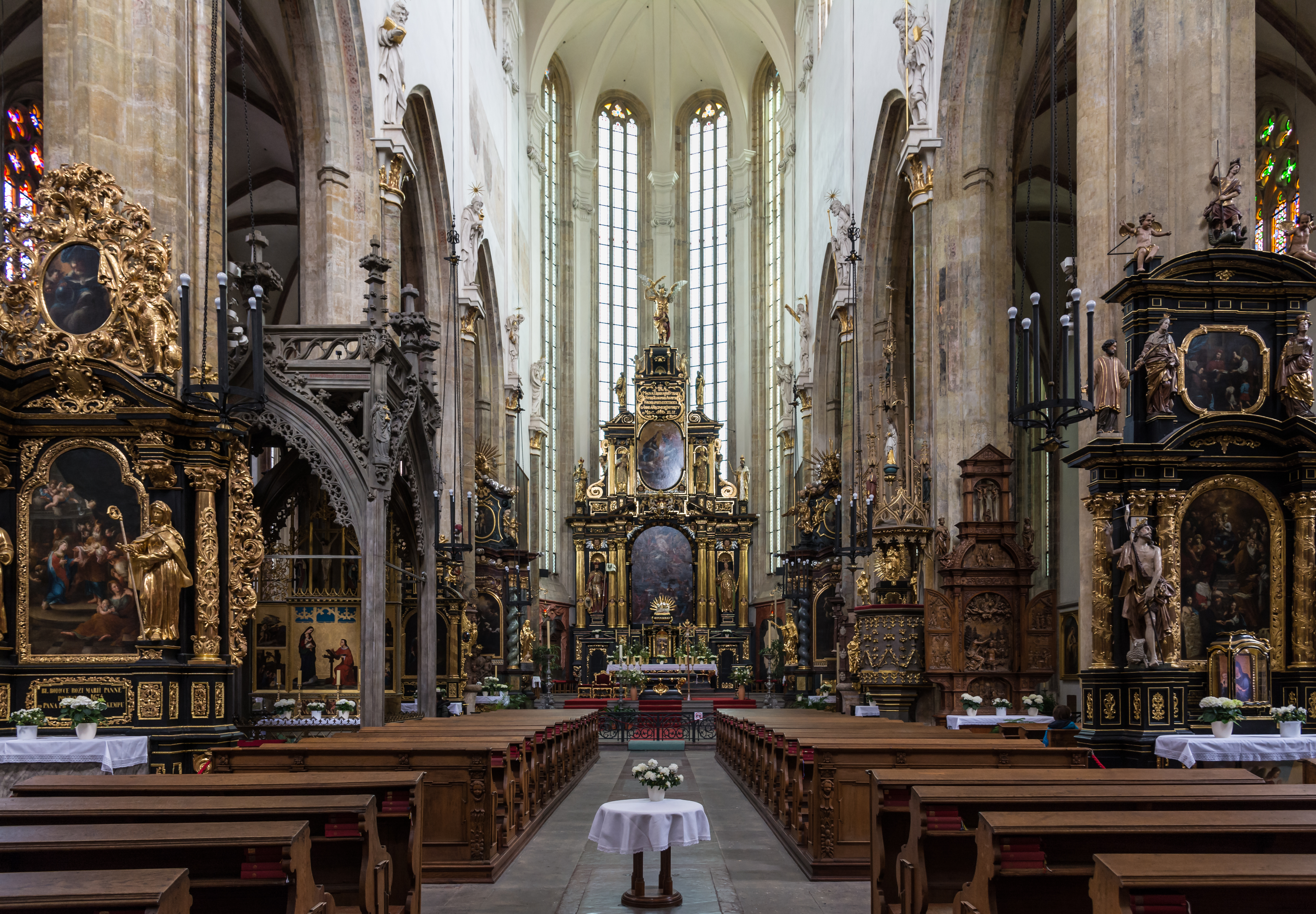
On the left side, the stone baldaquin from 1493 by Matěj Rejsek

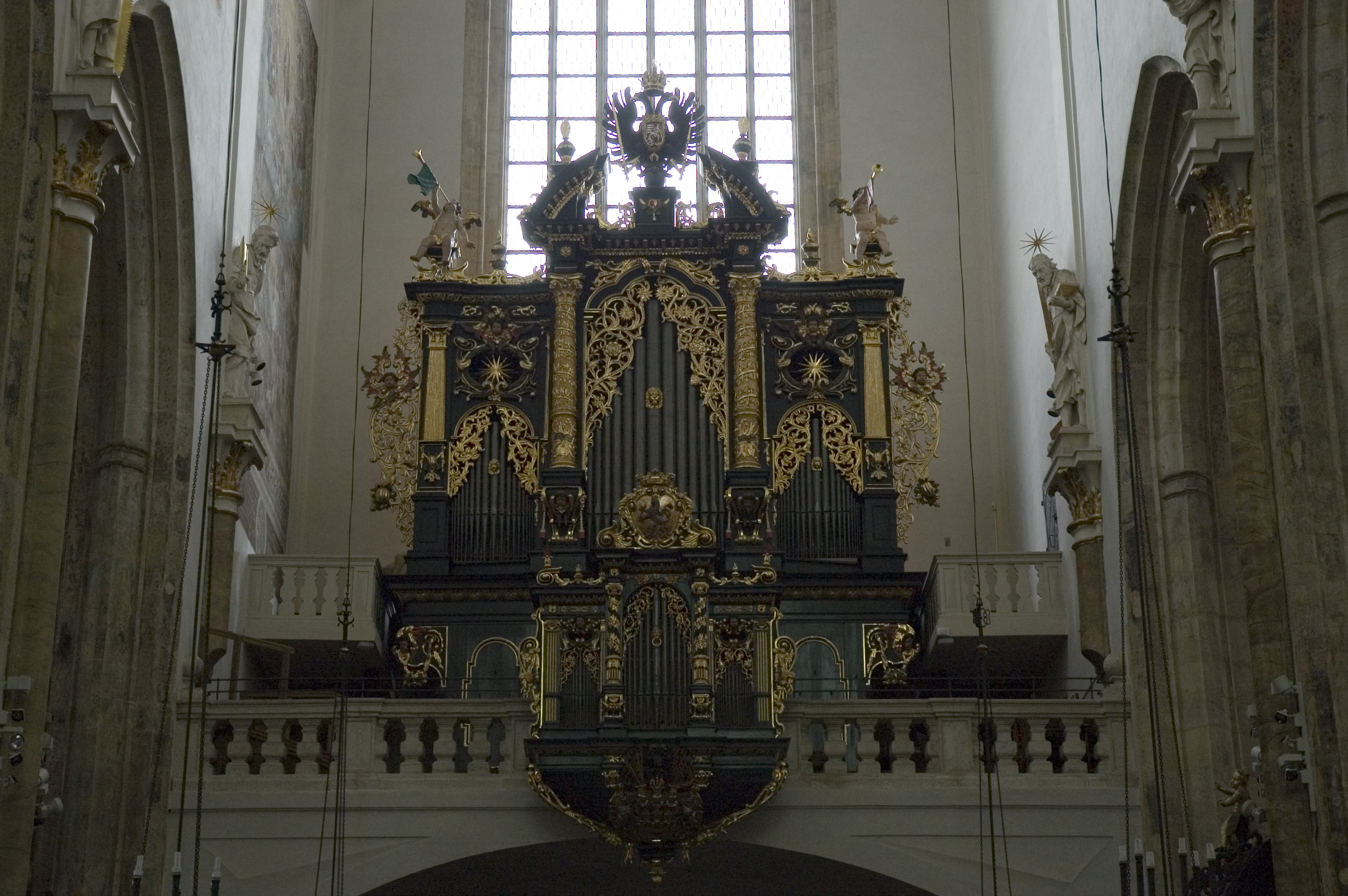
Pipe organs by Jan J. Mundt

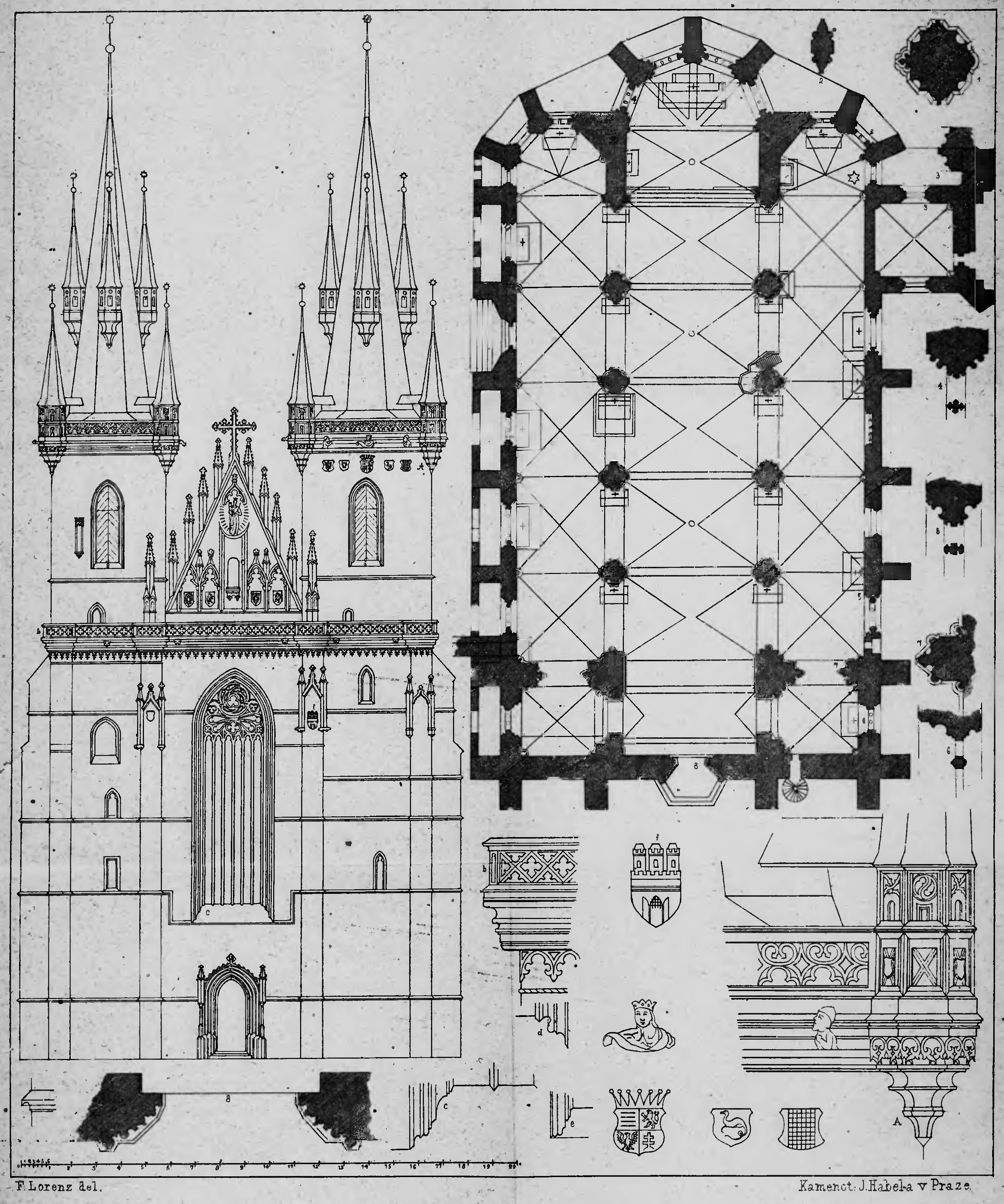
Church's floorplan

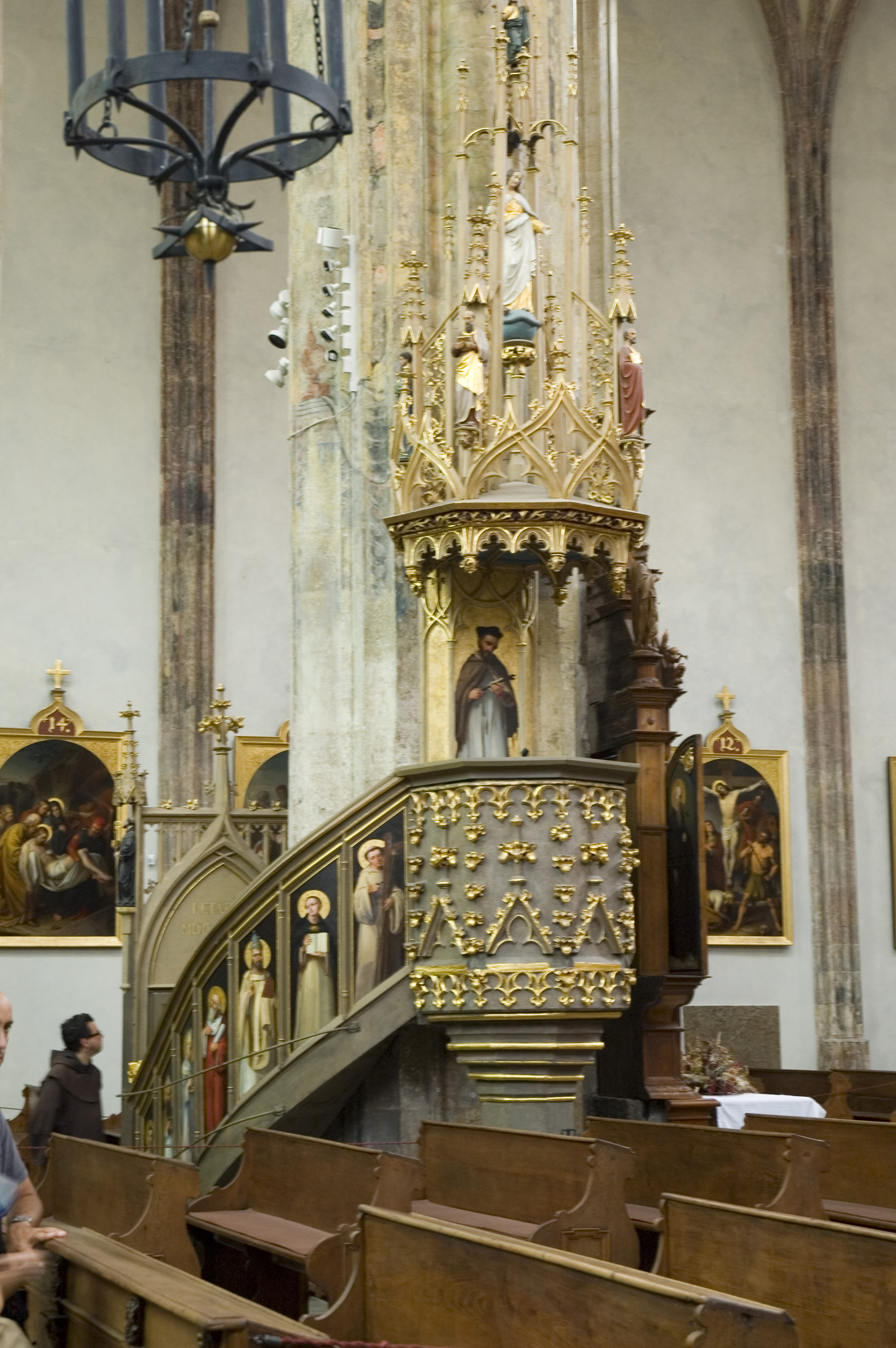
Stone pulpit

== See also ==
- List of Jesuit sites
