= Jan Jiří Balzer =

Czech engraver (1738–1799)

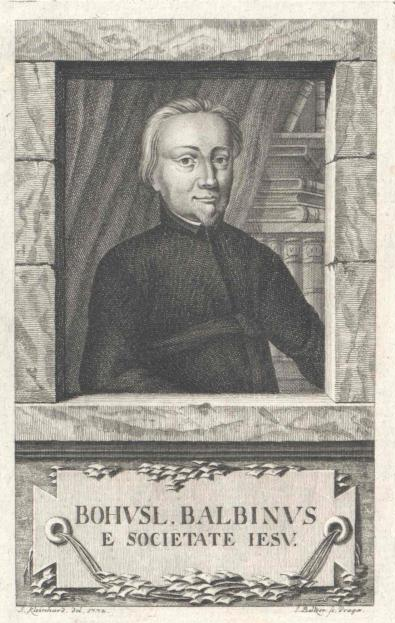
Bohuslav Balbín, engraving

Jan Jiří Balzer (German: Johann Georg Balzer; 6 August 1736 – 14 December 1799) was a Czech engraver. He was the most famous of a large family of engravers.

== Life ==
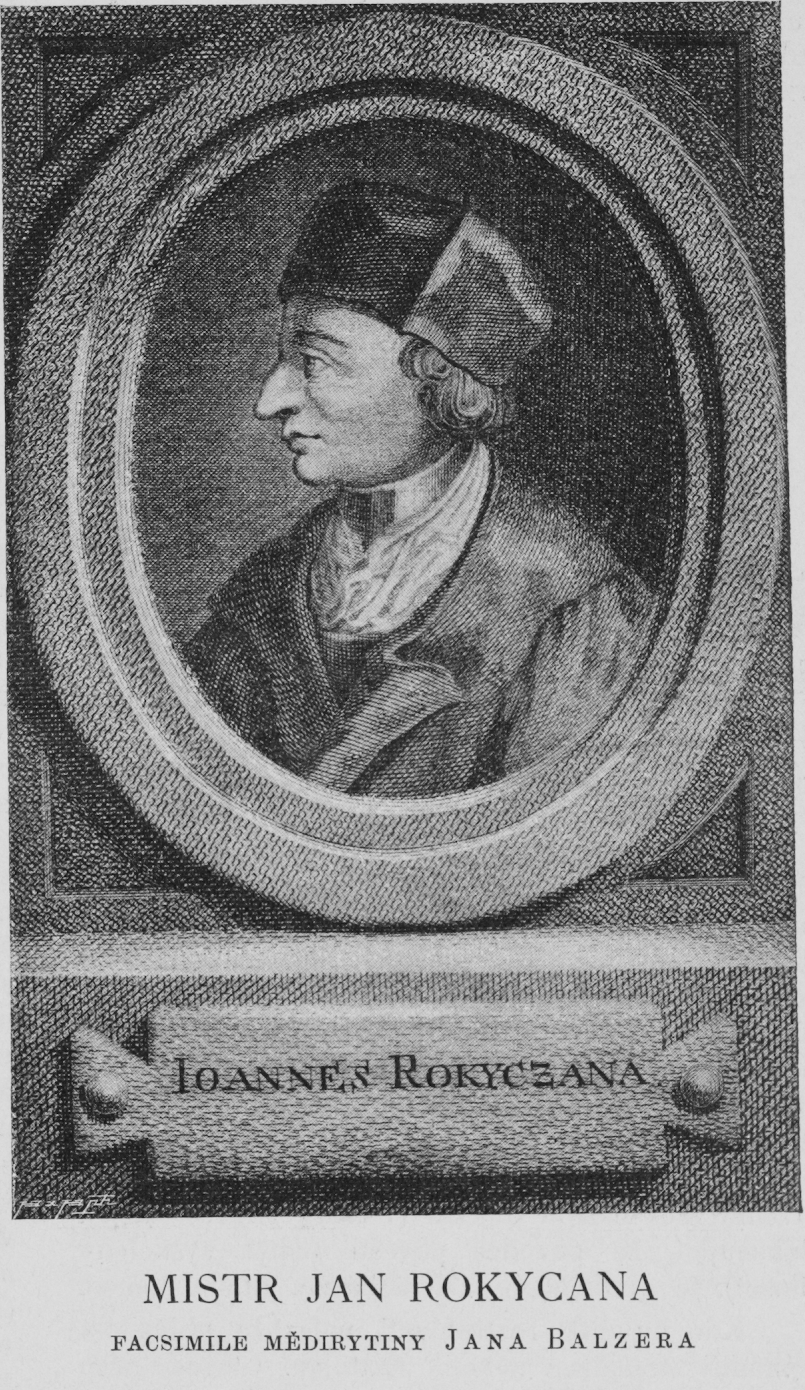
Jan Rokycana, engraving

Balzer was born on 6 August 1736 in Vlčkovice in the Kingdom of Bohemia. He was the oldest of eight siblings. His father Jan Jiří Sr. was an engraver, and four of his siblings also became engravers. He was first learned art from his father and then from Michael Rentz. Subsequently he completed his education by travelling through Germany, where he visited several universities and art schools (but it is unknown which specifically).

He then returned to Bohemia and in 1767, he bought a house in Lysá nad Labem. Shortly after that, he married Anna Kateřina Havlová (1744–1816). Their first two children were sons, Jan Karel (1769–1805) and Antonín Karel (1771–1807), who both became engravers. They had also four daughters. In 1770, Balzer applied for permission to establish his own copperplate publishing house in Lysá nad Labem. He obtained permission and began publishing, but his plan to prevent the import of copperplate engravings from abroad and get rid of competition failed. His company prospered, which was also helped by Balzer's contacts abroad.

In 1771, Balzer and his family moved to the Malá Strana district of Prague. From 1776, they lived in the Old Town of Prague. Jan Jiří Balzer died on 14 December 1799, aged 63.

== Works ==
Balzer's works include:

- A set of 50 plates of landscapes and architectural subjects, with Biblical, mythological, and genre groups of figures after Norbert Grund, an old German painter.
- Two sets of portraits of artists and learned men of Bohemia and Moravia; published by František Martin Pelcl in Prague in the years 1773–1782 (90 plates).
