= Jan Rokycana =

Czech Hussite theologian

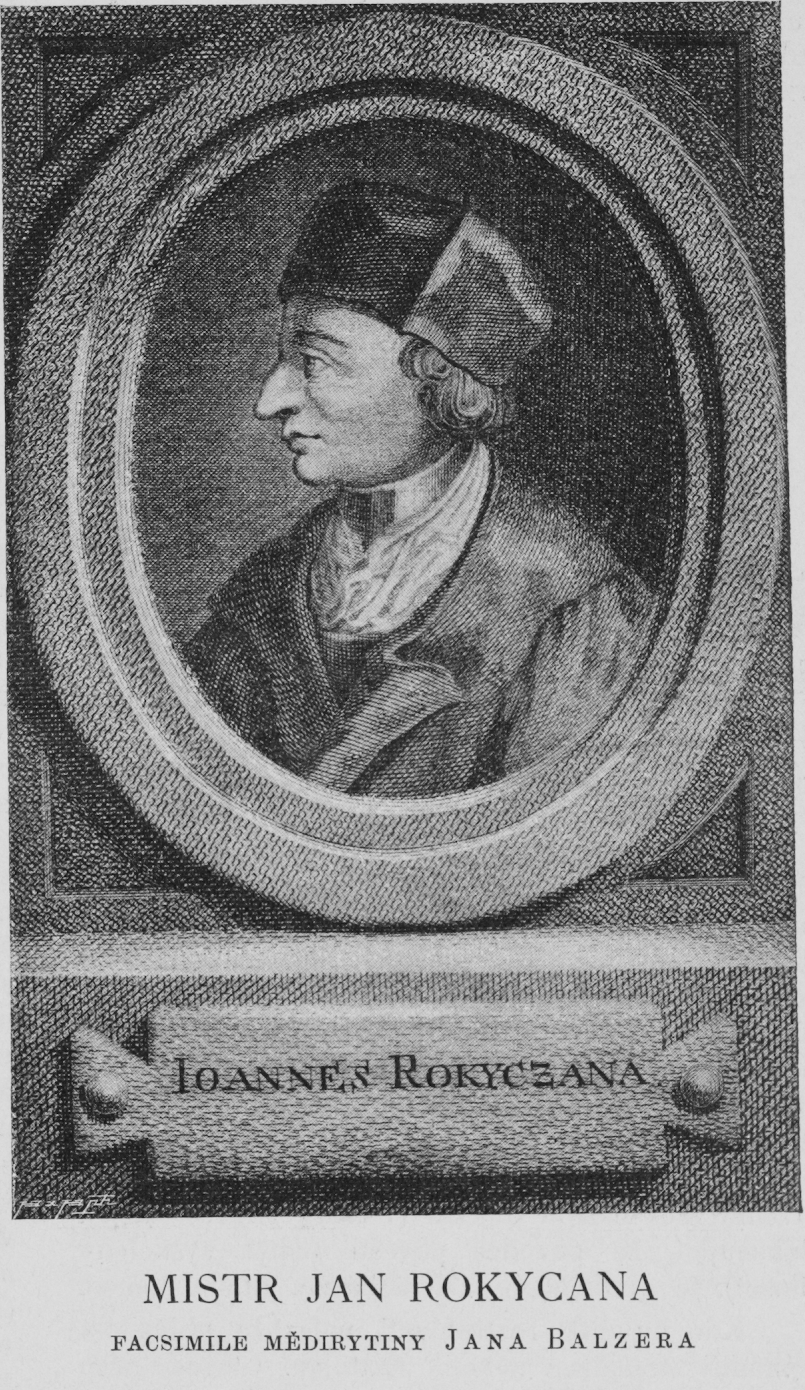
Jan Rokycana, engraving by Johann Balzer

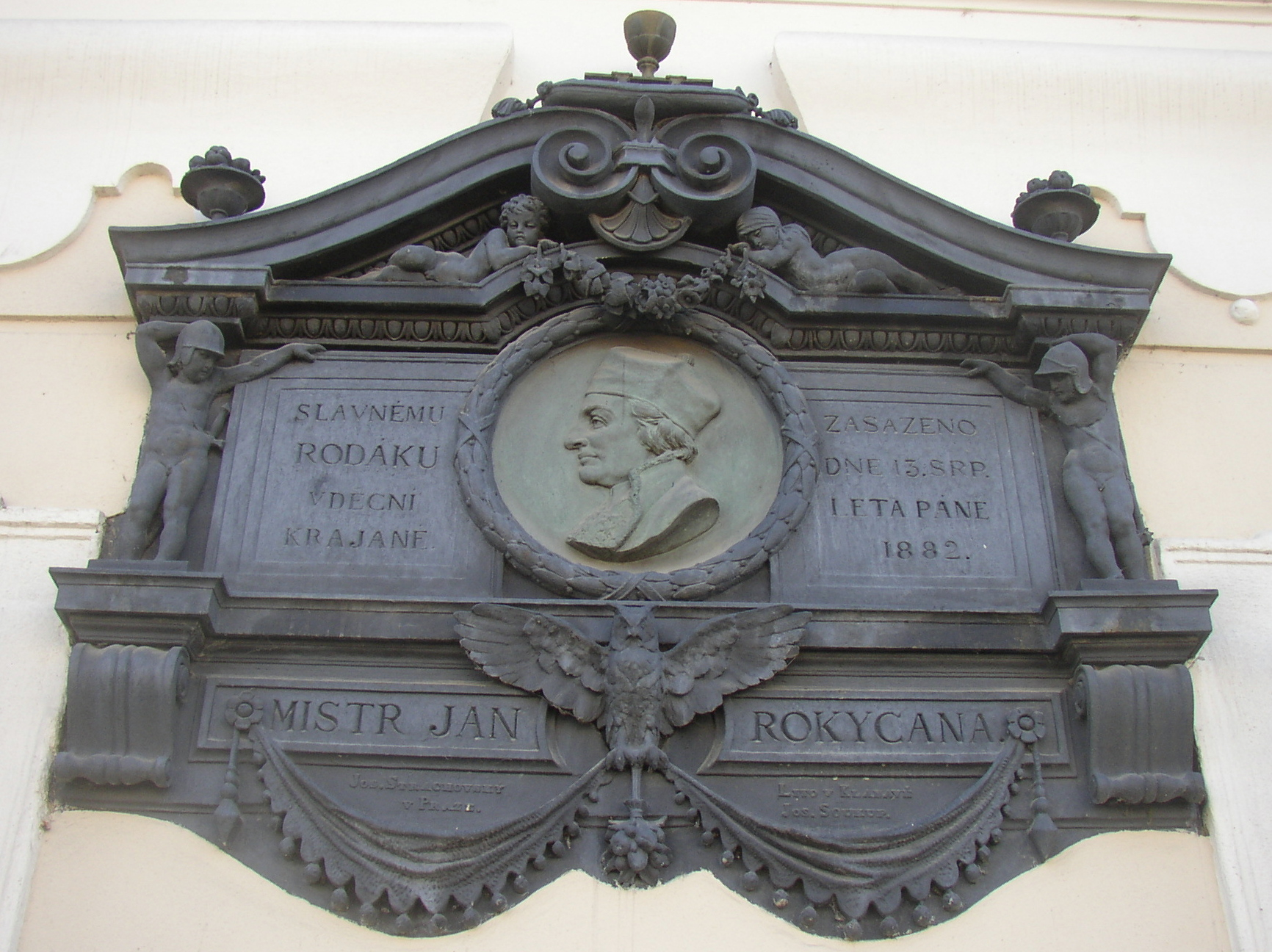
Memorial plaque of Jan Rokycana on town hall in Rokycany

Jan Rokycana (also known in English as John of Rokycany and Jan of Rokycany; also known in Czech as Jan z Rokycan) (c. 1396 in Rokycany – 21 February 1471 in Prague) was a Czech Hussite theologian in the Kingdom of Bohemia and a key figure of the Bohemian Reformation.

== Life ==
In his youth, Jan Rokycana entered the Augustinian monastery in Rokycany. Later, he left the monastery to study in Prague, gaining his baccalaureate in 1415. He joined the movement against Jan Želivský, after which he had to flee from Prague. He also opposed the Taborites, most notably at Konopiště in 1423. Later in Prague he opposed Jan Žižka, when he was blamed for the defeat of the Prague militia at Malešov.

In 1427 he became the vicar of Týn church. He even opposed Sigismund Korybut. In 1429 he became the správcem duchovenstva podobojí, or the Vicar General of the Prague Archbishopric. In 1430 he earned his Master of Arts, and in 1435 became rector of Charles University.

On 4 October 1441 he convened an assembly of all estates at Kutná Hora, where the fundamentals of Hussite belief were laid down as the law of the land. In the year 1442 he made his peace with Jan Příbram. In 1444, the courts found in his favour against the Taborites, who still refused to comply with the unanimous policy and the Tábor doctrine was decried.

In 1449, he started to correspond regularly with Pope Nicholas V, because he needed to carry out ordinations to the priesthood. In the end, he tried to come to see the Pope in person, but was unable to pass through Germany. For this reason, in 1451 he started talks with Constantinople about the potential cooperation of the Hussite and Greek Churches, but had to give up in 1452, when Constantinople fell to the Ottoman Turks.

King Ladislaus Posthumus (1440–1457) was unsure of Rokycana's agenda, so he avoided his sermons. In 1457, Jan Rokycana started corresponding again directly with the Pope (now Pope Callixtus III), though this was interrupted by Ladislaus's death.

The situation was somewhat improved by the rise of George of Poděbrady, and although George of Poděbrady tried to reduce the power of the church, Jan Rokycana supported his election through his lectures. From the beginning, Jan endorsed George of Poděbrady's politics and had all churches ring their bells to mark the reconciliation of the Vratislavskys. In return, George of Poděbrady considered him to represent the church and alternated between attending Jan Rokycana’s masses and those in St. Vitus Cathedral.

In 1461, George of Poděbrady began aspiring to the crown of the Holy Roman Emperor, which would surely have meant renouncing the chalice of Hussitism. This led Jan Rokycana to speak against George of Poděbrady in his sermons. On 7 February 1465 he took part in a dispute over the king's ministry, after which the king requested greater cooperation from the church. A year later, in 1466, Jan Rokycana suffered a stroke, after which he started to have trouble speaking. He was buried in Týn church.

For his seal, he used a horseshoe with a star, probably in memory of his father, who was a blacksmith.

== Works ==
- Postilla – collected by his students on the basis of his lectures from 1453 to 1457, probably the most interesting Czech postilla, because it in no way discussed theological problems, but rather focused on the everyday problems of people living in those times.
- Latinská postilla
- Výklad zjevení svatého Jana – A Discussion of The Revelations of Saint John
- Kázání u Kutné Hory – Sermons at Kutná Hora
- Řeči pronesené na koncilu Basilejském – Speeches Given at the Council of Basel
- Synodální řeči – Speeches of the Synod
- O sedmi vášních a vadách – Seven Passions And Problems, his greatest transgression
- Acta synodální – Acts of the Synod
- Latinský slovník – A Latin Dictionary
- Tractatus de eucharista
- Tractatus de septem sacramentis
- Contra sex propositiones trivolas doctorum apostatarum

He has also been credited by some sources with the composing of several songs.

  - Vítaj milý Jezu Kriste – Welcome Dear Jesus Christ
  - Zdrávas dievko
  - Cierkev svatá v posledních dnech velmi neznamenitá – The Holy Church in Recent Days Very Unremarkable – here he clearly wrote both not only the words but also the melody.

== See also ==
- Hussites
- Hussite Wars
- Czech Literature
- Czech lands: 1198-1526
